= 1919 Birthday Honours (MBE) =

This is a list of Member of the Order of the British Empire (MBE) awards in the 1919 Birthday Honours.

The 1919 Birthday Honours were appointments by King George V to various orders and honours to reward and highlight good works by citizens of the British Empire. The appointments were made to celebrate the official birthday of The King, and were published in The London Gazette from 3 June to 12 August. The vast majority of the awards were related to the recently ended War, and were divided by military campaigns. A supplementary list of honours, retroactive to the King's birthday, was released in December 1919.

== Member of the Order of the British Empire (MBE) awards ==
=== Military Division ===
For valuable services rendered in connection with military operations in the Aden Peninsula —

- Temp Lt. Norman Willis Clayton MC
- Lt. Geoffrey Morton Eden, Royal Army Service Corps

For valuable services rendered in connection with military operations in the Balkans —

- Lt. Cyril John Andrewes, Royal Army Service Corps
- Lt. Eric Clement Barker, Shropshire Light Infantry
- Lt. John Percival Barker, Royal Field Artillery
- Temp Lt. Graeme Morrison Black, Royal Scots Fusiliers
- Lt. George Shearsley Blake, North Staffordshire Regiment
- Lt. Joshua Rupert Ingham Brooke, Royal Garrison Artillery
- Lt. Frederick Arthur Brough, Royal Field Artillery
- Lt. Herbert Browning, Hampshire Regiment
- Lt. Ian Robert Cranford George Mary Bruce, Q.O., Cameron Highlanders
- Lt. Hugh Alan Bruno Bruno, Hampshire Regiment
- Temp Lt. Bernard Temple Cadoux
- Temp Lt. Frederick Christian Charnand
- Lt. Lowthianr Hume Chidson, East Surrey Regiment
- Lt. Harold Frederick Cree, East Kent Regiment
- Lt. Reginald Francis Dew, Royal Engineers
- Temp Lt. Artihur William East
- Temp Lt. Henry William Erby, Royal Army Ordnance Corps
- Lt. Richard Philip Hastings Eyre, Royal Army Service Corps
- Temp Lt. Henry Robert Faulkner, East Surrey Regiment
- Lt. Henry Barry Fetherston MC Royal Field Artillery
- Temp Lt. Edward Seymour Foster
- Lt. Thomas Lawrence Fox, Royal Army Service Corps
- Lt. George Herbert Freeman, Royal Garrison Artillery
- Lt. Brian Berkeley Gattie, Royal Army Service Corps
- Temp Lt. Ernest Edward Goate, Royal Engineers
- Lt. James Stanley Peel Godsell
- Temp Lt. Evelyn Rudolf Albert John Gout
- Temp Quartermaster and Lt. John Richard Gower, Welsh Regiment
- Lt. Robert Wallace Greenlees, Royal Garrison Artillery
- Lt. Arthur Charles Hext, E. Riding Yeomanry
- Lt. Preston Horan, Durham Light Infantry
- Temp Lt. Harold Allan Dilke Hoyland
- Lt. Roland Cecil Hudson, Scottish Horse Yeomanry
- Temp 2nd Lt. Hubert John Humphries, Oxfordshire and Buckinghamshire Light Infantry
- Lt. Archie William Ibbotson MC Indian Army Reserve of Officers
- Temp Lt. John Jardine, Royal Engineers
- Temp Lt. Vincent Raymond Kenny, Royal Engineers
- Lt. Malcolm King, Argyll and Sutherland Highlanders
- Quartermaster and Temp Lt. Alfred James Knight, Duke of Cornwall's Light Infantry
- Lt. Harold Edward Kitching, Durham Light Infantry
- Lt. Edward Leonard La Fontaine
- Lt. Roger Uredale Lambert, Royal Field Artillery
- Lt. William John Luxton
- Temp Lt. Henry Charles Gordon McCormick, Royal Army Service Corps
- Lt. Niel Boyd Watson McEacharn, King's Own Scottish Borderers
- Lt. Edward Robert Mileson MacGuire, Middlesex Regiment
- Lt. Harrison Martin, Royal Field Artillery
- Lt. John Francis Ralph Massy-Westropp, Royal Irish Fusiliers
- Lt. Ernest Francis K. Matthews, Shropshire Light Infantry
- Lt. Ernest Middleton, Royal Field Artillery
- Lt. Joseph Charles Miller, Royal Army Ordnance Corps
- Lt. George Ash Minter, Royal Army Service Corps
- Temp 2nd Lt. Archibald John Morris, S.W. Bords
- Lt. Ramsay Llewellyn Ives Nares
- Lt. Crawford Noble, Suffolk Yeomanry
- Lt. William Francis Vaughan Parry
- Lt. Thomas Partington, Royal Army Service Corps
- 2nd Lt. James Perkins, Royal Engineers
- Lt. Harold Oldham Rose, Royal Engineers
- Lt. Harry Francis Saunders
- Temp Lt. George Henry Gould Smith
- Lt. Matthew Garvan Steele, Royal Field Artillery
- Capt. John Stirling, Lovais Scouts
- Lt. Charles John Strachan, Royal Sussex Regiment
- Lt. Thomas Angus Swan
- Temp Lt. Hugh Oddin Taylor, Royal Army Service Corps
- 2nd Lt. Kenneth John Thomson, Royal Engineers
- Temp Lt. Henry Gordon Tomson, Suffolk Regiment
- Lt. David Alexander Weir, East Surrey Regiment
- Lt. Charles Clement Stuart White, Royal Engineers
- Lt. John Dane Woodall MC Royal Artillery

For valuable services rendered in connection with military operations in East Africa—

- Lt. Alfred Thomas Duncan Anderson, Indian Army Reserve of Officers
- Temp Capt. Howard Wolfenden Armstrong
- Capt. Charles Matthew Baker, Labour Corps, East African Forces
- 2nd Lt. Alexander Black, Royal Engineers
- Temp Capt. George Guy Butler, Royal Army Medical Corps
- Capt. Edward Redvers Kerrington Collins, Labour Corps, East African Forces
- Temp Capt. Andrew Crawford, Royal Army Medical Corps
- Capt. Walter Doble, Labour Corps, East African Forces
- Temp Capt. George Windham Wright Evans
- Rev Joseph Fillion, Royal Army Chaplains' Department
- Capt. Walter Graham, Labour Corps, East African Forces
- Capt. John Isdale Greig Royal Army Medical Corps
- Rev Robert Hack, Royal Army Chaplains' Department
- Lt. Robert Innes, Labour Corps, East African Forces
- Capt. Arthur Fitzherbert King-Magee, East African Forces
- Lt. Frederick Loveridge, East African Forces
- Rev John Bernard McCormack, Labour Corps, East African Forces
- Temp 2nd Lt. William Samuel Maddams, Royal Engineers, East African Forces
- Quartermaster and Capt. George. William Martin, Royal Army Service Corps
- Quartermaster and Temp Lt. Andrew Michie, King's African Rifles
- Temp Capt. Henry Felix Mullan, Royal Army Medical Corps
- Lt. Joseph (Prince) Mussanji Walugembe, African National Medical Corps
- Temp Lt. William Maxwell Nightingale
- Temp Capt. Frederick Cecil Pheysey, Royal Army Service Corps
- Temp Capt. Edward John Joseph Quirk, West African Medical Service
- Hon Lt. William Sydney Rapley, Royal Engineers
- Quartermaster and Capt. James Sin Robertson, East African Medical Service
- Temp Lt. Veral Glen Robins, Royal Engineers
- Temp Lt. Frederick Saunders, Royal Engineers
- Quartermaster and Capt. Robert Stanley, East African Medical Service
- Capt. Ernest Elliot Stock, East African Forces
- Temp Lt. William Joseph Suffield, King's African Rifles
- Lt. Johri Unger, East African Forces
- Temp Lt. Charles Ernest Ufquhart, Royal Army Ordnance Corps
- Lt. Frank Watkins, East African Forces
- Temp Capt. Harold Braithwait Whitaker, Royal Engineers
- Temp Capt. James Bowman Wilkie Royal Army Medical Corps

South African Forces

- Temp Lt. Herbert James Beatty
- Temp Capt. Frank Haart Bowen, SA Special Service
- Temp Capt. John Brown, Rhodesian Forces
- Temp Capt. Robert Edward Clegg, SA Service Corps
- Rev Hugh Frederick De Lisle, SA Chaplains' Department
- Capt. Robert Douglas Argyll Douglas SA Medical Corps
- Temp Lt. David Fraser, SA Service Corps
- Lt. Vickefy Hamilton, SA Service Corps
- Temp Capt. James Osier Henrey, SA Motor Cyclist Cps
- Temp Lt. Walter John Houghton, SA Motor Cyclist Cps
- Temp Capt. Hugh Hendrick Christein Ahrens Lance, SA Special Service
- Capt. Stuart Mackintosh McPherson, SA Medical Corps
- Temp Capt.William Alfred Manseth, SA Service Corps
- Temp Capt. Rupert James Hartwell Pattle, SA Service Corps
- Lt. Fulham Turner, SA Water Supply Corps
- Temp Capt. William Watson, SA Special Service

For valuable services rendered in connection with military operations in German South West Africa —

- Lt. Arthur William Collett, Hunt's Scouts
- Lt. Charles Newbald Smith, Hunt's Scouts

For valuable service rendered in connection with military operations in France —

- Temp Lt. Frank Adcock, Royal Engineers
- Temp 2nd Lt. William Allan, Royal Army Service Corps
- Temp Lt. Gerald Owrlyle Allingham, Royal Engineers
- Temp Lt. John Henry Arundel, Royal Engineers
- Temp 2nd Lt. Walter Cleveland Armitage, Royal Army Service Corps
- Staff Sergeant M. Charles Henry Atkins, Royal Army Service Corps
- Lt. Ernest Atteniborougih, Royal Engineers
- Lt. John Joseph Bannon
- Lt. Edwin Ernest Barnett, Northumberland Hussars
- Lt. William Sooley Battle, Royal Army Service Corps
- Lt. Arthur James Beer, London Regiment
- Alice Mary Bennett, Unit Administrator, Queen Mary's Army Auxiliary Corps
- Staff Sergeant Maj. Marmaduke Bevan, Royal Army Service Corps
- Temp Lt. Arthur Grimwade Bishop, Worcestershire Regiment
- Temp Lt. Edgar Derwenit Blackwood, Royal Engineers
- Temp Lt. Arthur Blair-White, Royal Field Artillery
- Lt. George Sebastian Bleck, Lothians and Border Horse
- 2nd Lt. Cyril Henry Charles Bond, Royal Army Service Corps
- Temp Lt. Stanley Hunt Brand, Royal Army Service Corps
- Sub. Condtr. William Thomas Brewster, Royal Army Ordnance Corps
- Temp Quartermaster and Lt. Ernest Gottlieb Isdeal Brice, Royal Army Medical Corps
- Temp 2nd Lt. George Wauchop Stewart Brown, Rifle Brigade
- Phillis Warden Brown, Unit Administrator, Queen Mary's Army Auxiliary Corps
- Temp Lt. Godfrey Middleton Eric Bryan, Royal Army Service Corps
- Lt. Thomas Edward Bryan, Royal Berkshire Regiment
- Lt. Hugh Edward Bullivant, Royal Field Artillery
- Lt. Walter Beresford Bulteel, Scottish Horse
- Thomas Frederick Busby, Royal Engineers
- Norah Evelyn Cable, Unit Administrator, Queen Mary's Army Auxiliary Corps
- Temp Quartermaster and Lt. Donald George Campbell, Somerset Light Infantry
- Lt. John Campbell, Royal Engineers
- Sergeant Maj. Albert John Carey, Royal Army Service Corps
- Hattie Maud Carey, Unit Administrator, Queen Mary's Army Auxiliary Corps
- Lt. Rupert Tristran Oliver Gary, Middlesex Regiment
- Staff Sergeant Maj. John William Carr, Royal Army Service Corps
- Lt. Morden Archibald Carthew-Yorstoun, Royal Highlanders
- Superintendent Clerk Sydney Challice, West Yorkshire Regiment
- Temp Lt. Martin Harry Clark, Royal Army Service Corps
- Quartermaster Sergeant Ernest Herbert Clarke, Royal Army Medical Corps
- Staff Quartermaster Sergeant Fred Wainwright Claye, Royal Army Service Corps
- Staff Quartermaster Sergeant Herbert Edmund Clegg, Royal Army Service Corps
- Quartermaster and Lt. William Joseph Clements, Rifle Brigade
- Temp 2nd Lt. John Cleemishaw, Royal Engineers
- Quartermaster Sergeant Ernest Coates, Rifle Brigade
- Lt. Percy Matthew Comflbes, Royal Garrison Artillery
- Staff Sergeant Maj. John Connell MC Royal Army Service Corps
- Quartermaster and Lt. Francis John Cooper, Machine Gun Corps
- Quartermaster and Lt. Albert Corney, East Kent Regiment
- Temp Lt.George Arthur Costello, Royal Engineers
- 2nd Lt. Harry Cotten, Royal Engineers
- Superintendent Clerk William James Robert Craig, Royal Engineers
- 2nd Lt. Thomas Cranston, Royal Engineers
- Temp Lt. Colin Ross Grombie, Royal Army Service Corps
- Temp Capt. Percy Cumming
- Gladys Daglish, Department Administrator, Queen Mary's Army Auxiliary Corps
- Company Sergeant Maj. John Davis, Royal Garrison Artillery
- Gladys Dening, Unit Administrator, Queen Mary's Army Auxiliary Corps
- Battery Sergeant Maj. Edmond Doolan, Royal Field Artillery
- Temp Lt. Arnold Louis Dugon, Royal Marine Light Infantry
- Betty Dundas, Unit Administrator, Queen Mary's Army Auxiliary Corps
- Staff Sergeant Maj. Walter Dunham, Royal Army Service Corps
- Temp Quartermaster and Lt. William Egan, Royal Irish Regiment
- Elizabeth Francis Eldred, Unit Administrator. Queen Mary's Army Auxiliary Corps
- Charlotte Emily Elkin, Unit Administrator, Queen Mary's Army Auxiliary Corps
- Quartermaster and Lt. James Henry Elliott
- Temp 2nd Lt. Percy Elmore, Royal Army Service Corps
- Temp Lt. Albert Victor Eustace, Labour Corps
- 2nd Lt. Charles Falconer Guy Everett, Hampshire Regiment
- Temp Lt. Frank Morley Farmer, Royal Army Service Corps
- Temp Lt. Eric Athelstane Field, Lab. Corp
- Lt. Edward Hubert Field MC Royal Field Artillery
- Lt. William Samuel Field, Royal Army Ordnance Corps
- Staff Sergeant Maj. Frank Fitzgerald, Royal Army Service Corps
- Temp Lt. Samuel Ernest Sydney Fitzsimon, Royal Irish Rifles
- Temp Lt. Harry Spry Ford, Royal Army Service Corps
- Cecily Penrose Foster, Department Administrator, Queen Mary's Army Auxiliary Corps
- Sergeant Maj. James Bartholomew Fox, Royal Garrison Artillery
- Ada Emily Francis, Department Administrator, Queen Mary's Army Auxiliary Corps
- Temp Lt. Arnold Eardley Francis, Royal Army Service Corps
- Quartermaster and Lt. Walter Fry
- Lt. Edward Cecil Gardiner, Devonshire Regiment
- Lt. George Augustine Gee MC Royal Garrison Artillery
- Lt. John Appollonius Glason, Lancashire Fusiliers
- Lt. Julian Glencross, Northumberland Fusiliers
- Temp Lt. Alfred Philip Godfrey
- Temp Lt. John Forbes Gower, Royal Army Service Corps
- Quartermaster and Lt. William Holmes Green, Oxfordshire and Buckinghamshire Light Infantry
- Quartermaster Sergeant William Crynant Griffiths, Royal Engineers
- Quartermaster Sergeant James Gunn, Seaforth Highlanders
- Temp Lt. Thomas Hampton DCM Essex Regiment
- Lt. Nigel Hanbury, Coldstream Guards
- Temp Lt. Frank Hancock
- Lt. William Handy, Royal Engineers
- Temp Lt. Stanley William Hanscombe, Royal Army Service Corps
- Staff Quartermaster Sergeant Ernest Edwin Harcher, Royal Army Service Corps
- Monica Harcourt-Brown, Department Administrator, Queen Mary's Army Auxiliary Corps
- Temp Lt. Wyndham John Dorney Harding
- Winifred Maud B. Harford, Unit Administrator, Queen Mary's Army Auxiliary Corps
- Lt. Edmund Harman, Rifle Brigade
- Staff Sergeant Maj. Joseph Harold DCM Royal Army Service Corps
- Staff S.M George Harrison DCM Royal Army Service Corps
- Lt. Richard Warhurton Hartley, Royal Army Service Corps
- 2nd Lt. Austin Mozart Harvey, Devonshire Regiment
- Ethel Francis Hatch, Unit Administrator, Queen Mary's Army Auxiliary Corps
- Temp Lt. William Ashton Hatch, Royal Engineers
- Quartermaster Sergeant Walter George Hartnell, Somerset Light Infantry
- Temp Lt. Comley Hawkes MC Royal Army Ordnance Corps
- Temp Lt. Albert Gordon Jones Hawkins
- Temp Lt. Ernest George Hayes
- Temp Quartermaster and Lt. Harry Haywood, West Yorkshire Regiment
- Temp Lt. Charles Hender Henderson, Royal Engineers
- Beatrice Hestietha Gundreda Heyworth, Unit Administrator, Queen Mary's Army Auxiliary Corps
- Staff Quartermaster Sergeant Arthur Samuel Hicks, Royal Army Ordnance Corps
- Regimental Sergeant Maj. Frank Hill, 14th Hussars
- Temp 2nd Lt. Thomas Edgar Hill, Royal Army Service Corps
- Irene Decima Hobbs, Unit Administrator, Queen Mary's Army Auxiliary Corps
- Temp Lt. Alec Hollidge, Royal Army Service Corps
- Staff Sergeant Maj. Matthew Holywood, Royal Army Service Corps
- Sergeant Maj. Thomas Hunt, Royal Artillery
- Temp Lt. Harry Cyril Ingle
- Quartermaster and Lt. William Rudolph Vernon Isaac MC
- 2nd Lt. Cornelius John Gershom Jackman, Royal Army Service Corps
- Lt. Leonard Edward Sehnas Jackson, Royal Field Artillery
- Lt. Francis Henry Jones, Royal Engineers
- Diana Mabel Johnson, Department Administrator, Queen Mary's Army Auxiliary Corps
- Engr. Quartermaster Sergeant George William King, Royal Engineers
- Temp 2ud Lt. Alfred Thomas Kingston DCM Royal Engineers
- Ann Mary Kinross, Unit Administrator, Queen Mary's Army Auxiliary Corps
- Quartermaster Sergeant James William Kippen, King's Own Scottish Borderers
- Quartermaster Sergeant Edward John Leatherbarrow, Liverpool Regiment
- Quartermaster Sergeant Frederick William Leverett, Royal Fusiliers
- Temp Cndr. Herbert Stanley Lewarn, Royal Army Ordnance Corps
- Harriet Lightfoot, Unit Administrator, Queen Mary's Army Auxiliary Corps
- Temp Lt. Arthur Lisle, Royal Engineers
- Christian Gray Lorimer, Unit Administrator, Queen Mary's Army Auxiliary Corps
- Temp Lt. Francis Hamilton Lyon
- Violet Dorothy Agnes Lyon, Department Administrator, Queen Mary's Army Auxiliary Corps
- Lt. John William McLaren, Royal Army Service Corps
- Temp Lt. Albert Mander, Worcestershire Regiment
- Quartermaster Sergeant John Manton, Oxfordshire and Buckinghamshire Light Infantry
- Staff Conductor Alfred Charles William Maile, Royal Army Ordnance Corps
- Ethel Marsden, Unit Administrator, Queen Mary's Army Auxiliary Corps
- Conductor Alfred Walter Martin, Royal Army Ordnance Corps
- Quartermaster and Lt. Thomas Mashiter, York and Lancaster Regiment
- Temp Lt. Charles Bernard Mathews, Royal Engineers
- Sergeant Maj. Frederick Thomas Merrick, Royal Engineers
- Agnes Lizzie Middlemass, Asst. Administrator, Queen Mary's Army Auxiliary Corps
- Esther Mary Mills, Unit Administrator, Queen Mary's Army Auxiliary Corps
- Cecil May Morgan, Unit Administrator, Queen Mary's Army Auxiliary Corps
- Isabella Steele Milne, Unit Administrator, Queen Mary's Army Auxiliary Corps
- Quartermaster and Lt. William Henry Morris, Royal Berkshire Regiment
- Isabella Frances Narracot, Unit Administrator, Queen Mary's Army Auxiliary Corps
- Lt. Stanley John Nathan, Royal Engineers
- Temp Lt. James Colin Newman
- Heloise Scott Nicolls, Department Administrator, Queen Mary's Army Auxiliary Corps
- Temp Lt. Harry Lawrence Oakley
- Hon Lt. Count Robert Jean Marie Gaspard O'Gorman
- Lt. Henry John Ost, Royal Engineers
- Amelia Gertrude Ottman, Department Administrator, Queen Mary's Army Auxiliary Corps
- Company Sergeant Maj. George Albert Page, Labour Corps
- 2nd Lt. John Parker, Labour Corps
- Quartermaster Sergeant John Joslin Parker, Royal Army Service Corps
- Quartermaster Sergeant William Henry Parr, Royal Army Medical Corps
- Lt. Alan Stewart Patten, Royal Army Service Corps
- Lt. Herbert Cecil Pearce, London Regiment
- Temp Quartermaster and Capt. Sidney James Pearsall, Nottinghamshire and Derbyshire Regiment
- Quartermaster Sergeant William John Perch, Royal Army Medical Corps
- Lt. Harold William Perryer, Royal Engineers
- Lt. Ernest Thomas Adams Phillips, Royal Garrison Artillery
- Lt. Harold Lionel Phillips, Royal Field Artillery
- Lillian Lestella Elizabeth Georgina Phillpotts, Department Administrator, Queen Mary's Army Auxiliary Corps
- Temp Lt. Dennis Fielden Pilkington, Royal Army Service Corps
- Quartermaster Sergeant George Potier, King's Royal Rifle Corps
- Temp Lt. Wilfred Monsell Powell, 4th Leinster Regiment
- Staff Staff Sergeant Maj. Harry Rayner MC Royal Army Service Corps
- Supdg. Clerk Percy Raphael Regan MM Royal Engineers
- Margaret Maude Reynolds, Unit Administrator, Queen Mary's Army Auxiliary Corps
- Company Sergeant Maj. George James Roberts, Royal Army Service Corps
- Temp Lt. Harold Robinson, Royal Garrison Artillery
- Mary Rushworth, Unit Administrator, Queen Mary's Army Auxiliary Corps
- 2nd Lt. Samuel Schaverine, York and Lancaster Regiment
- Quartermaster Sergeant William Scott, Royal Army Medical Corps
- Quartermaster and Lt. Hardy Sellers, Royal Scots
- Temp Quartermaster and Lt. Frederick William Shorney
- Lt. Malcolm Macrae Simpson, Royal Army Service Corps
- Company Sergeant Maj. George James Small, London Regiment
- Lt. Dennis William Smith, Labour Corps
- Quartermaster Sergeant Sydney George Smith DCM Royal Engineers
- Mechanic Sergeant Maj. Frank Robinson Smith, Royal Army Service Corps
- Temp Lt. Cecil Edward Bartholomew Smith, Nottinghamshire and Derbyshire Regiment
- Quartermaster Sergeant Ernest Alfred Smith, Royal Army Medical Corps
- Lt. Herbert Alfred George Sorrell, Coldstream Guards
- Lt. Leslie Alan Spall, Herefordshire Regiment
- Temp Quartermaster and Lt. Harry Spencer MC Royal Fusiliers
- Cicely Stanhope, Unit Administrator, Queen Mary's Army Auxiliary Corps
- Regimental Quartermaster Sergeant Frederick Stapleton, Lancashire Fusiliers
- Margaret Starkey, Unit Administrator, Queen Mary's Army Auxiliary Corps
- Quartermaster Sergeant George Patrick Steer, Royal Army Medical Corps
- Lt. Sidney Francis Hood Stephens, Royal Field Artillery
- Temp Lt. Reginald Stevens, Royal Engineers
- Temp Lt. William Strang, Worcestershire Regiment
- Conductor John Strange, Royal Army Ordnance Corps
- Constance Marion Sutton, Unit Administrator, Queen Mary's Army Auxiliary Corps
- Quartermaster Arthur Tarbet, South Staffordshire Regiment
- Temp Lt. Frank Taylor DCM Royal Army Service Corps
- Lt. William Thomas Thornton, Durham Light Infantry
- Quartermaster and Lt. Ernest Henry Tibbs, Royal Army Medical Corps
- Staff Sergeant Maj. Robert Tindall, Royal Army Service Corps
- Quartermaster Sergeant Maurice Trippas, Rifle Brigade
- Lt. Arthur Ralph Trubshaw, Royal Field Artillery
- Isobel Agnes Turner, Unit Administrator, Queen Mary's Army Auxiliary Corps
- Sergeant Maj. Euclid Brookes Wager, Royal Garrison Artillery
- Lt. Earl Basil Kenmure Watson, London Regiment
- Temp Lt. Cyril Charles William Webb, Royal Army Service Corps
- Gladys Vivien Webb, Department Administrator, Queen Mary's Army Auxiliary Corps
- Quartermaster and Lt. Joseph Henry Webster MC
- Evelyn Janie Welsford, Unit Administrator, Queen Mary's Army Auxiliary Corps
- Staff Quartermaster Sergeant Ernest Whitbourn, Royal Army Service Corps
- Staff Sergeant Maj. Robert William White, Royal Army Service Corps
- Temp Lt. William Frederick Williams, Royal Engineers
- Quartermaster Sergeant Roderick Williams, Cameron Highlanders
- Lt. Ritchie Wilson, Royal Field Artillery
- Temp Lt. Ralph Justly Chatterton Wilson, Royal Army Service Corps
- Isabel Charlotte Woodford, Sister, Territorial Force Nursing Service
- Quartermaster Sergeant John Alexander Inglis Woods, South Wales Borderers
- Staff Sergeant Maj. Walter William Woods MC Royal Army Service Corps
- Lt. Lionel Sykes Wooler, Royal Artillery
- Regimental Quartermaster Sergeant John James Wray, Royal Garrison Artillery
- Quartermaster and Lt. Harry Wright
- Staff Sergeant Maj. Albert James Yates, Royal Army Service Corps
- Temp Lt. Frederick William Young, Labour Corps

Canadian Overseas Forces

- Lt. William Edward Carless, Canadian Engineers
- Lt. Harry Victor Coles, Canadian Machine Gun Corps
- Staff Sergeant Maj. Alexander Meldrum Craig, Canadian Army Service Corps
- Lt. George Osborne Hitchin Driver, Canadian Army Service Corps
- Lt. Alfred Burchain Harding, British Columbia Regiment
- Lt. Cecil Allan Hewett, 78th Canadian Battalion
- Lt. Henry Hurl Humphries, Canadian Army Service Corps
- Lt. Ian McLean MacDonell, Canadian Field Artillery
- Lt. Edward George Palmer, Alberta Regiment
- Hon Lt. William Rider Rider
- Sergeant Maj. Arthur Stanley, Canadian Forestry Corps
- Sergeant Maj. Frederick Worrall Thorn, Canadian Army Medical Corps
- Lt. Reginald Weightman, Canadian Army Service Corps

Australian Imperial Forces

- Lt. Leslie Frank Andrews, Australian Pioneer Battalion
- Lt. Edwin Mayhew Brissenden, Australian Infantry
- Lt. Albert John Cruise, Australian Infantry
- Lt. Maberltey Ester Dening, Australian Infantry
- Lt. John Harrington, Australian Army Ordnance Corps
- Lt. Loftus Hills, Australian Engineers
- Lt. Stanley Irwin, Australian Infantry
- Lt. James Edward Murray, Australian Infantry
- Lt. Ernest Borland Stanbury, Australian Engineers
- Lt. George Eric Teague, Australian Engineers
- Lt. Maurice Cleary Welch, Australian Army Ordnance Corps

New Zealand Forces

- Regimental Sergeant Maj. Henry Lower Carter, NZ Artillery
- 2nd Lt. Gordon Tate Lucas, NZ Machine Gun Corps

South African Forces

- Sergeant Maj. Henry Kimberley, SA Medical Corps

For valuable services rendered in connection with military operations in Italy —

- Lt. William John Anderson, Royal Field Artillery
- Lt. George William Skeat Armstrong, Royal Field Artillery
- Temp Quartermaster and Lt. Charles Bundock, Northumberland Fusiliers
- Lt. Amos Burrows, Royal Field Artillery
- Quartermaster and Lt. Joseph Cottle, Royal Army Medical Corps
- Lt. Theodore Edwin Dodds, Royal Field Artillery, attd. Royal Army Ordnance Corps
- Temp 2nd Lt. William Manning Edwards, Lab Cps
- Temp Lt. Thurston Hicks Everson, Royal Army Service Corps
- Lt. Basil Flexman McMurtrie, Royal Field Artillery
- Lt. John Benedict Eyre, Grenadier Guards
- Sub-Conductor Sydney Albert Fenn, Royal Army Ordnance Corps
- Company Sergeant Maj. Arthur Fieldhouse, West Yorkshire Regiment
- Lt. Douglas Gaskoin Fry, Gloucestershire Regiment
- Quartermaster and Capt. Herbert John Furler, Royal Army Medical Corps
- Lt. Henry Thomas Gilchrist, Royal Army Service Corps
- Temp Lt. Douglas Walter Stewart Hacker, Royal Field Artillery
- Lt. Norman Hamilton Smith, Royal Garrison Artillery
- 2nd Lt. Harry Douglas Hopcraft, Oxfordshire and Buckinghamshire Light Infantry
- Temp Lt. Alfred Hudson, Royal Engineers
- Temp Lt. Harry Carden Jones, Royal Army Service Corps
- Temp Quartermaster and Lt. Charles Robert Kilvert, York and Lancaster Regiment
- Temp Quartermaster and Lt. William Langston, Royal Army Medical Corps
- Sergeant Maj. Joseph Levy, Royal Army Medical Corps
- Staff Quartermaster Sergeant William Edward Lovett, Royal Army Service Corps
- Lt. James Eugene Mackay, Sussex Yeomanry
- Temp Lt. Guy Ross Madden, Royal Army Service Corps
- Temp Lt. Noel Lane Matthews, Royal Field Artillery
- Temp 2nd Lt. Joe Nelson, Royal Army Service Corps
- Temp Lt. Charles Plummer Ratcliffe, Royal Engineers
- Lt. Eric John Sainsbury, Royal Field Artillery
- Temp Lt. John Alan Slater, Royal Field Artillery
- Battalion Sergeant Maj. Denton Smith, Royal Field Artillery
- Temp Lt. Gerald Lionel Strina, Royal Army Service Corps
- Lt. Ralph Syminton, Royal Field Artillery
- Temp Quartermaster and Lt. Richard Allen Taylor MC Manchester Regiment
- Lt. Sydney Stanley Joe Travers, Royal Sussex Regiment
- Lt. Arthur Castle Turner, Royal Army Service Corps
- Temp 2nd Lt. Harry Norman Walford, Royal Army Service Corps
- Lt. William Walker, Highland Light Infantry
- Lt. John Basil Watling, Royal Engineers
- Temp Lt. Charles Sydney Williams, Royal Army Service Corps
- Quartermaster Sergeant John Edward Willsher, Royal Engineers

For valuable services rendered in connection with military operations in Mesopotamia — Lt. Robert Smith Aitchison, Royal Army Service Corps

- Lt. Alexander Anderson, Royal Army Service Corps
- Lt. Ernest Courtney Harold Norman Andrews, Royal Garrison Artillery
- Lt. William Ashcroft, 7th Hussars
- Temp 2nd Lt. Alec Eustace Azevedo, Royal Engineers
- Lt. Fred Banister, Indian Army Reserve of Officers
- Lt. Charles Gordon Barber, Indian Army Reserve of Officers
- Lt. George Henry Batterbury, Indian Army Reserve of Officers
- Lt. John Alton Bell, Indian Army Reserve of Officers
- Lt. William Edward Gustave Bender, Indian Army Reserve of Officers
- 2nd Lt. Gilbert John Beckford Bevan, 21st Burmah Railway Battalion, Indian Army
- Temp Lt. John Beynon, Royal Army Service Corps
- Lt. John Milligan Blair, East Surrey Regiment
- Lt. Arthur Newton Booth, Royal Field Artillery
- Lt. George Grahame Brewin, Indian Army Reserve of Officers
- Temp Lt. Douglas Archibald Guillan Brown, Royal Fusiliers
- Lt. Robert Ashfield Burgess, Royal Horse Artillery
- Lt. Charlie Robert Butcher, Indian Army Reserve of Officers
- Temp 2nd Lt. Archie George Chester-Master, Royal Army Service Corps
- Lt. Edward Maurice Ernest Coghlan, Royal Engineers
- Lt. Charles Herbert Cooper, Indian Army Reserve of Officers
- Lt. Edward Orme Cox, Indian Army Reserve of Officers
- Lt. Harold Oakes Crowther, Indian Army Reserve of Officers
- Staff Nurse Agnes Daly, Queen Alexandra's Imperial Military Nursing Service Reserve
- Temp Lt. Thomas Danson, Royal Army Ordnance Corps
- Temp 2nd Lt. James Edwin Davison, Royal Engineers
- Temp Lt. Sidney Arthur Bearing, Royal Engineers
- Lt. John Henry Edward de Robeck, Royal Field Artillery
- Lt. William Samuel Dickens, Indian Army Reserve of Officers
- Temp Lt. Herbert Julyan Donkin, Royal Engineers
- Lt. Austin Edward Makinson Dredge, Royal Army Service Corps
- Staff Nurse Barbara Elder Duthie, Territorial Force Nursing Service
- Temp 2nd Lt. Hen Charles Eccleston, Royal Engineers
- Temp Lt. Myles Layman Farr Elliott, Gloucestershire Regiment
- Lt. Richard Joseph Falgari, Indian Army Reserve of Officers
- Lt. Walter George Harry Filmer, East Kent Regiment
- Lt. John Finlay, Indian Army Reserve of Officers
- Temp 2nd Lt. George Henry Forster, Royal Engineers
- Lt. Ernest William Popplewell Fulcher, Norfolk Regiment
- Capt. Alfred Galvin, Indian Army Reserve of Officers
- Temp 2nd Lt. Leslie Iam Granti MM Royal Engineers
- Lt. George William Gravett, Indian Army Reserve of Officers
- Temp Lt. Leonard Gutteridge, Machine Gun Corps
- Temp 2nd Lt. Denis Leslie Harbottle, Royal Army Service Corps
- Temp Lt. Victor Hardy
- Lt. Claude Pickering Harris, Supply and Transport Corps, Indian Army
- Lt. Robert Charles Hill, 13th Hussars
- Temp Lt. Edward Hinks, Royal Army Ordnance Corps
- Temp Lt. Alfred Henry Robert Holmes, Indian Army
- Temp Lt. Alec Horace Edward Litton Holt, Royal Engineers
- Temp Lt. John Boyd Hopkins
- Lt. Leonard Hulbert, Indian Army Reserve of Officers
- Lt. Herbert Jackson, Indian Army
- Lt. William Henry Kingsberry, North Lancashire Regiment
- Temp Lt. Theodore Kirwan, Royal Army Service Corps
- Temp Lt. Douglas-Woolley Kitching, Royal Army Service Corps
- Lt. Reginald Edward Lines, Indian Army Reserve of Officers
- Lt. Walter Long MC Royal Field Artillery
- Lt. William McGrath, Indian Army Reserve of Officers
- Lt. George Douglas McNair, Indian Army Reserve of Officers
- Lt. Frederick Arthur Malcolm, Indian Army Reserve of Officers
- Temp Lt. Gilbert Charles Martin, Royal Army Service Corps
- Temp Capt. Everard Ernest Massey, Royal Army Service Corps
- Lt. Harry Matthews, Indian Army Reserve of Officers
- Lt. Ernest May, Royal West Kent Regiment
- Temp 2nd Lt. George Joseph Mercer
- Lt. Alfred Minns, Somerset Light Infantry
- Temp Lt. William Harold Morgan, Royal Army Service Corps
- Lt. Vere Mockett, East Kent Regiment
- Temp Quartermaster and Lt. John Sarel Moore, Royal Army Medical Corps
- Lt. Francis Peete Musgrave, Sussex Yeomanry
- Lt. Nathan Coleman Myers, Indian Army Reserve of Officers
- Lt. Edwin McKillop Nicholl, Indian Army
- Temp Lt. George Arthur Openshaw, Lancashire Regiment
- Temp Lt. Joseph Hubert Owens CIE Royal Engineers
- Lt. Walter Parsley MC Norfolk Regiment
- Temp 2nd Lt. Donovan William Alan Pragnell, Royal Army Service Corps
- Temp 2nd Lt. Victor Robert Penman, Royal Army Service Corps
- Lt. Gerald Hugh Power, Royal Warwickshire Regiment
- Temp 2nd Lt. John Nathaniel Pring, Royal Army Ordnance Corps
- Lt. Richard Bury Ramsbothani, Indian Army Reserve of Officers
- Lt. Rana Jodha Jung Bahadur Rana, MC Indian Army
- Lt. Charles Oliver Caleott Reilly, Indian Army
- Temp Lt. Robert Renfrew
- Hon Maj. Denis Kingston Rennick, Indian Army
- Lt. Ernest Rupert Ridley, Indian Army
- Lt. Clifford Rose, Indian Army
- Temp Capt. Alexander Lewis Ross, Royal Army Service Corps
- Temp Lt. Archibald Rowlands, Army Cyclist Corps
- Capt. Frank James Salberg, Indian Army Reserve of Officers
- Temp Lt. Stanley Emberick Shurmur, Royal Army Service Corps
- 2nd Lt. Andrew George Hume Sievwright, Indian Army Reserve of Officers
- Lt. Ralph William Smith, Manchester Regiment
- Temp Lt. Thomas Smith
- Lt. John Thomas Snelgar, Wiltshire Regiment
- Temp 2nd Lt. Richard William Spear, Royal Engineers
- Temp Lt. William James Leonard Stribling, Royal Army Service Corps
- Temp Lt. Charles Arthur Cholmley Steward MC Royal Welsh Fusiliers
- Temp Quartermaster and Lt. Thomas James Sutton, Royal Army Veterinary Corps
- Temp Lt. Frederick Matthias Tobin, Royal Army Service Corps
- Lt. John Reginald Howard Tweed, Indian Army
- Temp Lt. Gilbert Alexander Urmson, Royal Army Service Corps
- Temp Quartermaster and Lt. George Benisford Walker MC Royal Army Medical Corps
- Temp Lt. Reginald Henry Walker, Royal Engineers
- Lt. Harry Walton, Indian Army Reserve of Officers
- Temp Lt. Robert Charles Owen Wells, Royal Army Service Corps
- Lt. Charles Ernest Wilson, East Kent Regiment
- Temp Lt. Robert Drake Williams, Royal Engineers
- Lt. Leslie Williams
- Temp Lt. John Ramsay Worthington, Liverpool Regiment
- Lt. Colin Campbell Whyte, Manchester Regiment
- Temp 2nd Lt. Robert Fiennes Wykeham Martin, Royal Engineers
- Lt. Robert Montford Michaelson Yeates, Indian Army Reserve of Officers

Australian Imperial Forces

- Lt. Frederick Ernest Moore, Australian Engineers

For valuable services rendered in connection with military operations in North Russia (Archangel Command) —

- Lt. Leslie Ebenezer Clarke
- 2nd Lt. Cecil Aubrey Cooper, Royal Engineers
- Lt. Frederic Evans, Royal Army Medical Corps
- Lt. Leopold Percival Hodson
- Temp 2nd Lt. Matthew Barr McNair, Royal Army Service Corps
- 2nd Lt. William Vincent Rendel
- Lt. Eric John Vardon, East Surrey Regiment
- 2nd Lt. Vsevolod Victor Watson, Royal Garrison Artillery
- Lt. Godfrey Fuller Whistler, Royal Field Artillery

New Zealand Overseas Forces

- 2nd Lt. Allan Frederick Burke, Otago Regiment

For valuable services rendered in connection with military operations in North Russia (Murmansk Command) —

- Lt. Robert William Fenning, Royal Engineers
- Temp 2nd Lt. Ernest Alfred Johnson, Royal Army Service Corps
- 2nd Lt. Joseph Thomas Littlehales, Royal Field Artillery
- Temp 2nd Lt. James McKerchar, Royal Army Service Corps

In recognition of distinguished services rendered during the War—

- Capt. William John Adkins, Gloucestershire Regiment
- Lt. Stanley Long Amor
- Lt. Joseph Claude Andrews
- Lt. Bruce Otinndel Angell
- Lt. William Mills Arnot
- Lt. Henry James Axten, Royal Fusiliers
- Capt. Alan Hugh Sancroff Baker
- Capt. Percy Charles Barber, Chaplain
- Capt. Hazen Obtis Barnaby, Royal Field Artillery
- Lt. Philip Henry Barr
- Administrator Constance Theodora Bayley
- Capt. Bernard James Beeton
- Capt. Roderick Belli-Bivar, Royal Irish Fusiliers
- Capt. Charles Burnley Belt MC South Staffordshire Regiment
- Capt. Harold Leonard Betteridge
- Lt. Jack Pelham Percival Leslie Biggs
- Capt., Edmund Ivan Montford Bird
- Lt. Harry Booker
- 2nd Lt. John Alexander Bonnyman, Welsh Regiment
- Lt. William Bowring
- Lt. Henry Edwin Brackenboro
- Lt. Charles Joseph Brockbank
- Capt. John Brown MC
- Capt. Walter Edward George Bryant, Royal Fusiliers
- Lt. Thomas Leslie Forbes Burnett
- 2nd Lt. Patrick John Burns, Royal Garrison Artillery
- Capt. Walter Leslie Burt, Essex Regiment
- Lt. Leonard Charles Bygrav
- Lt. David Cairns, Highland Cyclist Battalion
- Lt. Arthur Edward Cambridge
- Lt. Malcolm Campbell, Royal West Kent Regiment
- Capt. Ernest Patrick Carmody, Royal Army Medical Corps
- Deputy Administrator Mary Carnley
- Capt. Alfred William Carter DSC
- Lt. Hamilton Cassels
- 2nd Lt. Waiter Ruanley Castings
- Capt. John Chambre
- Capt. Charles Kingsley Chandler
- 2nd Lt. Bernard Cheeseman
- Capt. Samuel Clare
- Lt. Paul Colbeck, Northumberland Fusiliers
- Lt. Richard Awdrey Wihite Collet
- Capt. William John Cooper, Australian Flying Corps
- Capt. Bertie Frederick Crane
- Lt. Alexander Thomas Cranmer, Middlesex Regiment
- Lt. William Ernest Cranmer, Middlesex Regiment
- Capt. Henry Lumsden Crichton, Army Ordnance Depot
- Lt. Richard Llewellyn Crofton
- Capt. Wallace Guy Murdock Crothers, Suffolk Regiment
- Lt. Stanley Currington, West Riding Regiment
- 2nd Lt. John Dorrien Constable Curtis MC Royal Lancaster Regiment
- Lt. Frank Dance
- Lt. James Huddart Dand
- 2nd Lt. Henry Dawes
- Lt. William Dawson
- Deputy Administrator Florence Day
- Lt. George Edward Morgan Dean, Canadian Field Artillery
- Capt. Robert Donald
- 2nd Lt. Francis George Eckford
- Lt. Raymond Walter Everett
- 2nd Lt. Hugh Kingsley Fairbrother
- Capt. Thomas Fawdry, North Lancashire Regiment
- 2nd Lt. Cyril Alfred Firmin, 59th Squadron
- 2nd Lt. Maurice Boltora Fitzgerald
- Lt. John Raven Frankish
- 2nd Lt. Leonard Freeborn
- Capt. Sidney Thomas Freeman
- Capt. Oliver Harry Frost MC Middlesex Regiment
- Capt. Alfred Andrew Fry
- Capt. Norman Berwick Fuller
- 2nd Lt. Angus Robertson Fulton
- Lt. Robert George Fyfe
- Lt. Ernest Walter Greer
- Capt. Thomas Maitland Gerrard
- Lt. Harry Herbert Giles
- Capt. Stanley Charles Godfrey MC Royal Scots Fusiliers
- Lt. George Francis Golding
- 2nd Lt. Robert Clark Graham, North Staffordshire Regiment
- Lt. Frederick Grave, London Regiment
- Capt. Alfred George Griggs
- Capt. Auckland William Wollaston Groome, Norfolk Yeomanry
- Capt. Percy Edward Gwyer, Royal Marine Artillery
- Capt. Thomas Grove Gordon
- Deputy Administrator Marjorie Halcrow
- Capt. William Edward Hayward
- Capt. Leonard Henshall, South Lancashire Regiment
- Lt. George Alexander Hill MC Manchester Regiment
- Lt. Charles Edward Hodgson, Royal Warwickshire Regiment
- Capt. Harry Hulbert
- Capt. Frank Jefcoate, Suffolk Regiment
- 2nd Lt. Henry Jones
- Capt. Henry Richard Kavanagh, Royal Irish Fusiliers
- Lt. William Graham Kewley
- Lt. Alfred George Knight
- 2nd Lt. John Morgan Knight
- Capt. The Hon Edward George William Tyrwhitt Knollys, London Regiment
- Capt. Errol Galbraith Knox, Australian Flying Corps
- Lt. John William Langmuir
- Lt. Edwin Joseph Langridge, North Staffordshire Regiment
- Capt. Ernest Penrlarves Leigh-Bennett
- Capt. Alexander Frederick Livingstone, King's Royal Rifle Corps
- Lt. Robert Elgin Lloyd Lott, West Ontario Regiment
- Lt. Percy Alexander McBain, Australian Flying Corps
- 2nd Lt. Reginald David Gorrie Macrostie
- Lt. Ronald Macdonald, Liverpool Regiment
- 2nd Lt. William John Maley
- Capt. Henry Clifford Mallett
- Capt. David Thomas William Manwell, Australia Flying Corps
- 2nd Lt. Alfred Palmer Marchant
- Lt. Lionel Jackson Mars, Yorkshire Hussars, Yeomanry
- Capt. Thomas Bertrand Marson, London Yeomanry
- Lt. James Buckland Mawdsley, Canadian F.C
- Lt. Kenneth Alexander Meek, West Yorkshire Regiment
- 2nd Lt. Donald Robert Mitchell
- Lt. Harold Spencer Morris, Coldstream Guards
- Lt. Patrick Henry Morrissey
- Administrator Dorothy Coward Muir
- Lt. Frank Murphy
- Lt. Thomas Hunter Nesbitt
- Administrator Florence Mai Shedlock Newton
- Capt. Walter Shackfield Newton-Clare
- Capt. Bernard John Nicholson
- Acting Commandant Charlotte Noel
- Lt. Harry Peter Northcote, West Yorkshire Regiment
- Capt. William Ewart Nuttall
- Capt. Gilbert Palmer, Devonshire Regiment
- Lt. George William Panter, Royal Irish Rifles
- Deputy Administrator Kathleen Pearce
- Lt. Philip Pearce Clay Penberthy, Shropshire Light Infantry
- Deputy Administrator Gwenllian Pertwee
- Lt. Frederick Peter
- 2nd Lt. Charles William Phipps
- Capt. David Ward Pinckney
- 2nd Lt. James Morton Pinkerton
- Lt. Edward Ernest Porter DCM Somerset Light Infantry
- Lt. Frederick Hartley Postlethwaite
- Lt. Frank James Bickley Powell
- 2nd Lt. William Peter Boulton Pugh
- 2nd Lt. John Charles Raine
- Administrator Aileen Rathbun
- 2nd Lt. David Morris Rees
- Capt. Walter Ricketts, Dragoon Guards
- Capt. Allbert Ridley, Dragoon Guards
- Capt. Eric Rivers Smith, Middlesex Yeomanry
- Capt. James Robinson
- Lt. George Wase Rogers, North Staffordshire Regiment
- Lt. George Orchard Roper
- Lt. Alexander Jacob Meyer Ross
- Lt. Arthur Alfred Rowe, Royal Engineers
- Lt. Charles William Rowe, Huntingdonshire Cyclist Battalion
- Capt. James Herbert Scandrett MC
- Capt. Albert Edgar Siddons-Wilson
- Lt. Robert John Sladden DCM
- Capt. Archibald Guelph Holdsworth Smart Royal Army Medical Corps
- Capt. Harold Stansfield
- Capt. Douglas Stuart Stevenson
- 2nd Lt. John Grant McKenzie Martin Stronach
- Lt. Frank Susans
- 2nd Lt. John Sutherland
- Lt. William Sutherland, Middlesex Regiment
- Capt. John Barry Rankin Swan
- 2nd Lt. Robert Swan
- Lt. Frank Arthur Swoffer, Middlesex Regiment
- 2nd Lt. Arthur Henry Taylor
- Capt. Bernard Archie Taylor
- Capt. Leicester Edward Taylor, Royal Engineers
- Hon Lt. Hugh Hamshaw Thomas, Royal Field Artillery
- Administrator Elizabeth Thomson
- Capt. Albert Peter Thurston
- Lt. Edward Trist
- Lt. Stephen Herbert Twining, Middlesex Regiment
- Lt. Henry Waddington, Manchester Regiment
- Capt. Hugh Colin Waghorn, London Regiment
- 2nd Lt. Frank Waldron, Worcestershire Regiment
- Lt. Harold Frederick Walker
- Lt. Peter Warburton, Royal Garrison Artillery
- Capt. William George James Wardle
- Lt. Alexander Milne Watson, Shropshire Light Infantry
- Lt. William Watson, Highland Cyclist Battalion
- Capt. William McIver Watt, Royal Highlanders
- Lt. Francis Mapleton Iremonger Watts, Worcestershire Regiment
- Capt. Donald Campbell Waylen
- Lt. James George Western
- Capt. Frederick Thomas Williams, West Yorkshire Regiment
- Lt. Gerald Atherton Williams
- Capt. Owen Williams
- Lt. Andrew McCrae Wilson, Highland Light Infantry
- Capt. Alexander Morice Wilsion, 4th Gordon Highlanders
- Capt. Francis Alexander Woolfe
- Lt. William James Turnbull Wright, Canadian Forestry Corps
- 2nd Lt. Hugh Joseph Young

Honorary Member

- Mulazam Tana, Mahmud Effendi Mustafa Maiher, 4th Battalion, Egyptian Army, attached Royal Air Force, Helmia, Egypt

For valuable services rendered in connection with the War —

- Lt. Louis Goodrich Abbot-Anderson, London Regiment
- Quartermaster and Capt. James Acheson, Royal Army Service Corps
- Lt. Francis Robert Adair, Staff for Royal Engineers Service
- Temp Lt. Herbert Windham Adams, Royal Army Service Corps
- Lt. Frederick Harold Adcock, Royal Field Artillery
- Lt. George Adkins
- Temp Lt. Herbert Marcus Adler, Royal Army Service Corps
- Maj. John Christie Aitkin, King's Own Scottish Borderers
- Quartermaster and Capt. William Harry Akhurst, 7th Hussars
- Lt. Sidney Charles Albany, 21st Hertfordshire Yeomanry
- Temp Lt. Charles William Alcock, East Surrey Regiment
- Temp Lt. Charles Edward Allen, 6th Res. Cav
- Capt. Alfred Ernest Allnatt, Royal Inniskilling Fusiliers
- Company Sergeant Maj. Henry Anderson, York and Lancaster Regiment
- Capt. Robert William Anderson, Army Pay Department
- Temp Lt. Thomas Percival Anderson, Royal Army Service Corps
- Maj. Ernest St. George Anson, East Surrey Regiment
- Temp Maj. George Wilfred Anson MC North Lancashire Regiment
- Lt. Lionel Gough Arbuthnot
- Capt. Cyril Armstrong Royal Army Medical Corps (Special Reserve)
- Capt. Thomas Aston, North Irish Horse
- Quartermaster and Capt. Henry Albert Atkins, Staffordshire Yeomanry
- Capt. Arthur George Atkinson, Royal Army Medical Corps
- Maj. Arthur Joseph Atkinson, East Yorkshire Motor Volunteer Corps
- Temp Capt. Ernest Henry Axten, Royal Engineers
- Temp Lt. Arthur John Ayden, Army Pay Department
- Lt. Frederick Backhaus, West Riding Regiment
- Lt. James Bacon, Royal Engineers
- Temp Capt. Herbert John Bailey, Royal Engineers
- Quartermaster and Capt. George Bertram Baillie, Royal Army Service Corps
- Quartermaster and Lt. Roderick Baillie, Royal Artillery
- Lt. George Norman Baines, West Yorkshire Regiment
- Lt. Horace Munton Baker-Munton MC Royal Field Artillery
- Capt. Sydney Arthur Ball, London Regiment
- Temp Lt. Arthur Gordon Bannatyne, Royal Army Service Corps
- Capt. John Ewart Trounce Barbary, Royal Artillery
- Temp Capt. George Henry Barber, Royal Army Veterinary Corps
- Capt. Henry Gladstone Barcay
- Temp Maj. Albert Edward Barnett, Royal Army Medical Corps
- Lt. Raymond Barnett, Royal Artillery
- Capt. William George Barnfield, Army Pay Department
- Lt. Charles Nicholson Barr, Royal Garrison Artillery
- Lt. Arthur Walker Barratt, Shropshire Light Infantry
- Temp Lt. Herbert Cecil Barrington, Royal Army Service Corps
- Lt. Edward William Bartie, Royal Defence Corps
- Temp Lt. George Barton
- Capt. Ronald George Batchelor, Staff for Royal Engineers
- Temp Lt. Henry George Baxter, Royal Irish Regiment
- Lt. Robert Charles Bean, Sussex Yeomanry
- Capt. Arthur Joseph Beatbie MC Royal Artillery
- Temp Capt. Lewis Henry Beesley, Rifle Brigade
- Quartermaster and Capt. Thomas Guy Beeton, Nigeria Regiment
- Temp Capt. Edward Hugh Benn, Royal Army Service Corps
- Lt. Walter Bann, Royal Engineers
- 2nd Lt. Archie Bennett, Oxfordshire and Buckinghamshire Light Infantry
- Lt.-Col. Philip Barnett Bentliff, Royal Jersey Medical Corps
- Capt. Arthur Cecil Procter de la Post Beresford-Peirse, Durham Light Infantry
- Battery Sergeant Maj. Robert Bertram, Scottish Rifles
- Temp Capt. William George Beszant, Royal Garrison Artillery
- Capt. Frederick Binns, Army Pay Department
- Lt. William Birch, Royal Artillery
- Mary Cecilia Bird, Unit Administrator, Queen Mary's Army Auxiliary Corps
- Temp 2nd Lt. Robert Odell Bishop
- Lt. Stanley Bishop, Royal Garrison Artillery
- Rev. Mordaunt Elrington-Bisset, Royal Army Chaplains' Department
- Lt. Walter James Blackburn, Royal Field Artillery
- Maj. Charles Nelson Lindsley Blackmore, 3rd Volunteer Battalion, Hampshire Regiment
- Lt. Cecil Patrick Bilackwell
- Capt. Alexander Blair, Royal Army Ordnance Corps
- Lt. Hubert Poster Blunt, Royal Warwickshire Regiment
- Lt. Samuel Boland, Royal Garrison Artillery
- Lt. Frederick Bolton, Royal Field Artillery
- Temp Lt. John Coulson Bosustow, Duke of Cornwall's Light Infantry
- Olive Bott, Unit Administrator, Queen Mary's Army Auxiliary Corps
- Quartermaster and Maj. John Bowers, Royal Army Service Corps
- Temp Capt. Cecil Bowes-Robinson, Royal Army Service Corps
- Temp Capt. Thomas Bowhill FRCVS Royal Army Veterinary Corps
- Capt. Cecil Hefferon Boyle
- Temp Capt. George Richardson Bradbury
- Temp Lt. James Bradford, Hampshire Regiment
- Temp Lt. Sydney Edward Joseph Brady, London Regiment
- Temp Capt. Ernest Livett Brash, Army Pay Department
- Lt. George Henry Bratby, Royal Garrison Artillery
- Temp Capt. John Vanghan Brett
- Temp Lt. Frederick Thomas Bridges, Royal Engineers
- Lt. Harold Norman Bright, Yorkshire Regiment
- Lt. Eric Evans Broadway, King's Own Scottish Borderers
- Capt. William Stewart Ranulf Brock, Special Reserve
- Temp Quartermaster and Capt. Henry Campbell Brodie, Leicestershire Regiment
- Maj. Richard Brodie, Royal Army Medical Corps
- Lt. Leonard Thornicraft Broot, Lincolnshire Regiment
- 2nd Lt. George Thomas Adams Brooks, Royal Defence Corps
- Lt. Cecil Howard Broughton, Royal Engineers
- Capt. Arthur Richard Dupuis Brown, Malay States Volunteer Rifles
- Lt. Frederick Brown, Royal Field Artillery
- Capt. Gilbert Alexander Murray Brown, Royal Engineers
- Temp Capt. Stanley Brown, Royal Army Medical Corps
- Alice Amelia Brown-Constable, Unit Administrator, Queen Mary's Army Auxiliary Corps
- Temp Capt. William Glynes Bruty
- Maj. Thomas Hedley Bryant, Suffolk Volunteer Corps
- Lt. James Frederick Buchanan, Cameron Highlanders
- Temp 2nd Lt. William Thomas Hansford Bugler, Royal Army Service Corps
- Sergeant Maj. William Bull, Royal Army Ordnance Corps
- Lt. Harold Malcolm Bullock, Scots Guards
- Lt. John Walter Bullock, Royal Engineers
- Lt. Clarence Burgoyne, East Riding Yeomanry
- Temp Capt. Hugh St. George Burke, Royal Army Service Corps
- Lt. Edward James Burns, Royal Artillery
- Capt. James Douglas Burrows, Essex Regiment
- Lt. Reginald Edward Burt, Nottinghamshire and Derbyshire Regiment
- Rev. Harold John Chandos Burton, Royal Army Chaplains' Department
- Capt. Eustace Norman Sutler, Royal Army Medical Corps
- Temp Capt. James Bayley Butler, Royal Army Medical Corps
- Capt. James Dickson Butler, Royal Munster Fusiliers
- Temp Lt. Claude Henry Buxton, Royal Army Ordnance Corps
- Quartermaster Sergeant Albert Cahill, Royal Army Service Corps
- Capt. Charles Holt Caldicott Royal Army Medical Corps
- Quartermaster and Capt. Charles Calvey, Royal Army Service Corps
- Capt. Alexander Duncan Cameron, Scottish Rifles
- Quartermaster and Capt. Thomas Duncan Cameron, Royal Army Medical Corps
- Lt. Harold James Campbell, Royal Field Artillery
- Temp Lt. John Monck Campion-Coles, North Staffordshire Regiment
- Temp Capt. John Valentine Garden, Royal Army Service Corps
- Temp Maj. Sidney John Ness Carrington, Royal Engineers
- Lt. John R. Carse, Royal Defence Corps
- Temp Capt. Charles Frederick Beall Carter, Royal Army Service Corps
- Temp Quartermaster and Capt. Thomas Benjamin Carter
- Capt. Ronald James Cavaye, Cameron Highlanders
- Lt. George Kirby Chambers, Royal Garrison Artillery
- 2nd Lt. Frederick Joseph Chandler, Royal Garrison Artillery
- Capt. Hugh Elphinstone Chandler, Royal West Surrey Regiment
- Lt. Frederick Grahame Cheeswright, Royal West Surrey Regiment
- Commander George Chenery, Royal Army Ordnance Corps
- Temp Capt. Hugh Chesterton, Rifle Brigade
- Temp Capt. Cyril Holland Child
- Temp Lt. Charles Christian, Royal Engineers
- Lt. McCulloch Christison, Royal Highlanders
- Lt. Kenneth Christopherson, West Kent Yeomanry
- Temp 2nd Lt. Athol England Clapham, Royal Army Service Corps
- Temp Capt. Hubert Charles Clark, Royal Army Service Corps
- Capt. Derrick Ansell Clarke, South Staffordshire Regiment
- Lt. Frederick Clarke, Royal Artillery
- Lt. Ernest Clay, Lancashire Regiment
- Temp Lt. Thomas Harry Clegg MC Manchester Regiment
- Temp Quartermaster and Lt. Frederick James Clements, Royal Engineers
- Capt. Charles William Clout, Lancashire Regiment
- Capt. Frederick William Clover, Army Schools Department
- Temp Lt. Henry Percy Cobb, Royal Army Service Corps
- Lt. Thomas Cokayne, Nottinghamshire and Derbyshire Regiment
- Temp Capt. David Henry Cole, Royal Army Service Corps
- Maj. Fritz William Cole, Gloucestershire Regiment
- Lt. Lowry Arthur CasaMaj. Cole, Royal Army Service Corps
- Quartermaster and Maj. William Henry Collins, 1st Dragoon Guards
- Lt. Hugh Francis Connolly
- Lt. Frank Reginald Cooksey
- Quartermaster and Lt. William James Coombes, Royal Artillery
- Capt. Ansell Edgar Cooper, Royal Army Ordnance Corps
- Maj. Bryan Ricco Cooper
- Temp Lt. Richard Tennant Cooper, Royal Engineers
- Temp Maj. Samuel Edward Cooper, Royal Engineers
- Capt. Melville Charles Dymock Cordeaux MC Royal Garrison Artillery
- Quartermaster and Lt. Frederick John Cosgrave, Royal Engineers Kent Yeomanry
- Quartermaster and Capt. Thomas Patrick Cosgrove
- Lt. Horace Wilkinson Coulson, Royal Engineers
- Lt. Percival Arthur Coulter, West Kent Regiment
- Temp 2nd Lt. Arthur Bertie Cousens, Royal Army Service Corps
- 2nd Lt. Ernest Cowley, Royal Guernsey Militia
- Quartermaster and Capt. George Cox, Royal Engineers
- Capt. Keith Trenchard Cox, Royal West Surrey Regiment
- Sergeant Maj. James Coyle, Army Schoolmaster
- Lt. Denis Coyne, Royal Field Artillery
- Lt. Graham Craig
- Capt. James Henry Crane, Royal Army Medical Corps
- Capt. Eric Norman Spencer Crankshaw, Royal Fusiliers
- Capt. Harold Sugden Crapper
- Temp Lt. Henry Rivers Cripps
- Temp Capt. William Maxwell Crosbie, Royal Engineers
- Lt. Arthur Gordon Cross MC Seaforth Highlanders
- Lt. James Frederick Crosse
- Temp Capt. George Henry Crossley, Royal Army Service Corps
- Lt. William Jolin Cullen, Leinster Regiment
- Temp Capt. Norman Cunliffe
- Annie Curtis, Unit Administrator, Queen Mary's Army Auxiliary Corps
- Temp Quartermaster and Capt. William Arthur Curtis, Royal Army Service Corps
- Maj. John Clarmont Daniell, Hertfordshire Regiment
- 2nd Lt. Dlann, William Squire
- Capt. John Edward Darby, 3rd Dragoon Guards
- Lt. George Graham D'Arcy
- Temp Capt. Alec Stuart Davidson, Royal Engineers
- Temp Lt. David Owen Davies
- Temp Lt. Charles Beverley Davies
- Temp Capt. Richard Llewellyn Davies, Royal Army Service Corps
- Temp Capt. Robert Davis, Royal Engineers
- Carmen Davoren, 1st Class Superintendent, Women's Legion
- Lt. Herbert Milner Dawson
- Temp Maj. William Bell Dawson MC Royal Scots Fusiliers
- Lt. George Albert John Day, Royal Garrison Artillery
- Lt. William Day, Leicestershire Regiment
- Capt. Walter Thomas Dean, Royal Garrison Artillery
- Lt. John Gordon Deedes, Royal Engineers
- Temp Capt. Edward Denby-Jones, Royal Army Service Corps
- Temp Capt. Leslie Lawson De St. Croix, Royal Army Service Corps
- Temp Lt. Frank De Tuyll
- Capt. Arthur Seymour Hamilton Dicker, Royal Sussex Regiment
- Temp Lt. Gilbert Charles Hamilton Dicker
- Temp Lt. Robert Dillon
- Capt. Enos Doggrell, Royal Garrison Artillery
- Lt. Francis Cecil Doherty, Essex Regiment
- Capt. Francis Alfred Emilio Dolmage
- Capt. George Reid Donald, Royal Highlanders
- Temp Lt. John Turner Douglas
- Staff Quartermaster Sergeant George James Dowdell, Army Pay Corps
- Sergeant Maj. Edgar Thurston Duarte, Royal Field Artillery
- Capt. Cyril Raymond Dudley, Lancashire Regiment
- Lt. Charles Duncan, Royal Field Artillery
- Temp Capt. Thomas Duncan
- Lt. William Durbridge, Royal Field Artillery
- Temp Quartermaster and Capt. Samuel Cosby Eastwood, Royal West Surrey Regiment
- Capt. Frederick Thomas Ecroyd
- Lt. Arthur Broughton Edge, Royal Artillery (geologist; director of the Imperial Geophysical Experimental Survey 1928-1931)
- Capt. Charles Joseph Edwards, Northumberland Fusiliers
- Sub-Conductor John Henry Edwards, Royal Army Ordnance Corps
- Temp Capt. Henry Gerard Eley, Royal Engineers
- Temp Capt. John Alfred Roy Eliot, Army Pay Department
- Temp Lt. Harry Charles Ellis, Royal Army Service Corps
- Capt. William Richard Ellison, Royal Artillery
- Capt. Alexander Lockhart Elsworthy, Royal Dublin Fusiliers
- Lt. William Englefield, Hampshire Regiment
- Lt. Bernard Scott Evans MC Royal West Surrey Regiment
- Temp 2nd Lt. Evan Reginald Evans, Royal Field Artillery
- Maj. Henry John Archibald Evans, Royal Field Artillery
- Capt. Samuel Earnest Evans
- Capt. James Wrigley Evatfc, Lancashire Fusiliers
- Mary Elizabeth Fairbairns, Commander, Queen Mary's Army Auxiliary Corps
- Rev. Henry Farquhar Royal Army Chaplains' Department
- Temp Capt. Frank Farmer, Army Pay Department
- Lt. Harry Farrance, West Yorkshire Regiment
- Temp 2nd Lt. Cecil Fenton
- Capt. John Fenton
- Hon Col. William Fenton Fenton-Jones, London Regiment
- Temp Capt. John Caldwell Fergusson MC Royal Army Medical Corps
- Temp Capt. David Field
- Lt. Harry William Finlay, London Regiment
- Temp 2nd Lt. George Drummond Fish
- Lt. Claude Frederick Urquhart Fisher, Royal Army Service Corps
- Temp Quartermaster and Capt. William Graham Lawson Fitchett, Royal Army Medical Corps
- Staff Sergeant Maj. Wilfred George Fitzwater, Royal Army Service Corps
- Capt. Bertram Maughan Footner, Royal Army Medical Corps
- Temp Lt. Albert Victor Wells Forsdyke, Royal Army Service Corps
- Temp Maj. Frederick Norman Forster, Royal Engineers
- Temp Lt. John Kenelm Foster-Melliar
- Lt. Rudolph Keane Franks, North Somerset Yeomanry
- Maj. Angus George Fraser, late King's Own Scottish Borderers
- Temp Lt. George Alexander Fraser, King's Own Scottish Borderers
- Temp Lt. John James Fraser, Royal Army Service Corps
- Capt. Charles William Froude, Royal Artillery
- Temp Lt. Sydney Ernest Fryer
- Temp Capt. Charles Fuller, Royal Engineers
- Temp Capt. Henry Arthur Gale, Royal Engineers
- Sergeant Maj. Sydney Gallie, Royal Army Medical Corps
- Temp Maj. Willoughby Lewis Garton, Royal Army Service Corps
- Capt. Geoffrey Gatliff Gatiliff, Royal Engineers
- Capt. Denny Victor Gedge, Special Reserve
- Temp Capt. Richard Westropp George, Royal Engineers
- Temp Maj. Andrew Dewar Gibb
- Temp Lt. James Baily Gibson, Royal Army Service Corps
- Temp Lt. John Montgomery Gibson
- Temp Capt. Lewis Evelyn Gielgud
- Elizabeth MacFarlarie Gilchrist, Asst. Administrator, Queen Mary's Army Auxiliary Corps
- Lt. Vernon Gillam, Royal Artillery
- Temp Lt. William Ernest Gillespie, Royal Army Service Corps
- Capt. Mowatt Godfray, London Yeomanry
- Capt. John Goiggin, Army Pay Department
- Maj. Charles Sidney Goldman, Royal Garrison Artillery
- Temp 2nd Lt. Julius Israel Goldman, Royal Army Service Corps
- Lt. Frank Goldsmith MM Royal Garrison Artillery
- Temp Lt. Francis Harrison Goodall, Royal Engineers
- Quartermaster and Capt. Arthur Goodwin, Royal Army Service Corps
- Maj. Peter Graham Graham-Barrow Jess Gow, Unit Administrator, Queen Mary's Army Auxiliary Corps
- Temp Capt. Andrew Grant Royal Army Medical Corps
- Temp Capt. Elliott Cecil George Gray, Royal Army Service Corps
- Temp Lt. George Gray
- Temp Capt. Robert Green, Royal Army Service Corps
- Janet Campbell Greenlees, Quartermistress, Queen Mary's Army Auxiliary Corps
- Maj. Bernard Eyre Greenwell, Hampshire Yeomanry
- Capt. Charles Stainforth Greenwood, late West Yorkshire Regiment
- Temp 2nd Lt. Richard Henry Gretton
- Quartermaster and Capt. Arthur James Griffin, Royal Field Artillery
- Capt. William Alfred Grist, Warwickshire Volunteer Corps
- Temp Capt. Walter Groome, Royal Army Medical Corps
- Quartermaster Sergeant Alfred Henry Gull, Royal Engineers
- Capt. John Gunn
- Maj. Herbert Charles Gunton, Co. of London Royal Engineers Volunteers
- Capt. Percy Claude Guy
- 2nd Lt. William Henry Hacker, Royal Engineers
- Quartermaster and Lt. Edgar Hall
- Temp Capt. Harry Reginald Holland Hall
- Temp Lt. Percival Stanhope Hall, Royal Army Service Corps
- Temp Quartermaster and Capt. William James Halloran, Cheshire Regiment
- Lt. Edward Harry Handley-Read, Machine Gun Corps
- Capt. Michael John Hanney, Army Pay Department
- Maj. Henry Stewart Hardy MC East Kent Regiment
- Quartermaster and Capt. William Robert Hargroves, Royal Army Service Corps
- Temp Lt. Ernest William James Harley, Royal Army Ordnance Corps
- Capt. Ronald Frederick Harmer, Gordon Highlanders
- Temp Lt. John Stanley Harper, Royal Engineers
- Temp Lt. John Latimer Harpur, Royal Army Service Corps
- Squadron Sergeant Maj. Francis George Harris, Royal Army Service Corps
- Temp Capt. Worsley John Harris, Royal Army Medical Corps
- Capt. Leonard Charles Harrison, Staff for Royal Engineers Service
- Capt. Edward William Spencer Cavendish, Marquess of Hartington, Derbyshire Yeomanry
- Temp Lt. William Harvey, Royal Army Service Corps
- Temp Capt. Reginald Henry Haviland, Durham Light Infantry
- Capt. Wilfred Pullen Haviland, Argyll and Sutherland Highlanders
- Quartermaster and Capt. George Henry Seymour Hearn DCM Royal Field Artillery
- Temp Quartermaster and Capt. Thomas Hedley, Royal Army Medical Corps
- Temp Lt. Theodore Fenwick Hedley
- Temp Capt. Frederick Helden, Royal Engineers
- Temp Capt. Ernest Palmer Hellyer, Army Pay Department
- Capt. Ian Macdonald Henderson, London Regiment
- Quartermaster Sergeant John Thomas Henshaw, Bedfordshire Regiment
- Temp Capt. Thomas Henshaw, Royal Army Service Corps
- Temp Capt. George Herbert, Royal Army Service Corps
- Capt. Conrad Pelham Heseltine, Worcestershire Regiment
- Quartermaster and Capt. William Henry Hesketh, Royal Garrison Artillery
- Maj. Joseph Marmaduke Hicks, Royal Army Ordnance Corps
- Capt. Lewis Hide, Royal Engineers
- Temp 2nd Lt. Percy John Higson, Royal Engineers
- Capt. William Higson, ret.
- Temp Capt. Robert Hill
- Lt. William Henry Hinton, Royal Field Artillery
- Temp Capt. Roland Georgia Hitchcock, Maur. Labour Battalion
- Lt. Thomas Hogan, Royal Engineers
- Maj. Ernest Frank Holden, Nottinghamshire Volunteer Corps
- Capt. Edgar Stopford Holland, Royal West Kent Regiment
- Temp Lt. Arthur Ernest Holmes, Royal Army Service Corps
- Temp 2nd Lt. Henry Edward Hopperton, Royal Engineers
- Lt. Wallace Edward Hoskins, Royal Engineers
- Temp 2nd Lt. Septimus Carolus Howard
- Maj. Owen A. Howell, London Yeomanry
- Lt. Charles Hudson, Yorkshire Light Infantry
- Capt. Rev. Richard Huggard
- Maj. Hugh Bliss Torriano Hume, Nottinghamshire and Derbyshire Regiment
- Quartermaster and Capt. Thomas Humphreys, 6th Dragoon Guards
- Capt. Reginald Noel Hunt, Army Pay Department
- Capt. John Francis Stuart Hunter, Royal Engineers
- Maj. Reginald Stanley Hunter-Blair, late Gordon Highlanders
- Garrison Sergeant Maj. Alfred Edward Hurle, Staff
- Capt. Henry Hussey, Army Schools Department
- Temp Capt. Rowland Radcliffe Huyshe, Royal Army Service Corps
- Lt. George Ibbitson, Royal Artillery
- Lt. George Blair Imrie, Royal Engineers
- Temp Maj. Bernard Sidney Ince
- Maj. George Alexander Innes, Royal Scots Fusiliers
- Helen Euphrosyne Ionides, Unit Administrator, Queen Mary's Army Auxiliary Corps
- Temp Lt. James Augustus Ireland, Royal Army Service Corps
- Temp Lt. Percival Jackling, Machine Gun Corps
- Temp Capt. Francis Munton Jackson
- Capt. Edward Lionel Luscombe James
- Temp Lt. Frederick Ernest Janson, Royal Army Ordnance Corps
- Temp Lt. Stanley Jay, King's Royal Rifle Corps
- Temp Lt. Herbert William Jenks, Suffolk Regiment
- Lt. Charles Townsley Jessap, Lincolnshire Regiment
- Temp Lt. Frederick Johns, Royal Army Ordnance Corps
- Temp Capt. William Alexander Johns, Royal Engineers
- Temp Capt. Reginald Johnson Royal Army Medical Corps
- Temp Capt. Oswell Jones, Royal West Kent Regiment
- Capt. Robert Jones, Scottish Rifles
- Lt. William Everard Tyldesley Jones, Royal Garrison Artillery
- Lt. Evelyn Whyaid Joslin, 11th Hussars
- Temp Lt.-Col. John Keay, Royal Army Medical Corps
- Lt. Ernest Keefe, Royal Horse Artillery
- Temp Capt. Harold Balfour Keeping, Royal Army Service Corps
- Lt. Raymond Wilfred Cordy Keer, Suffolk Regiment
- Lt. Cyril Humby Keitley, Manchester Regiment
- Lt. Sydney Kekewich, 21st Lancers
- Lt. Thomas Kelly, Army Pay Department
- Temp Capt. Charles Matheson Kennedy FRCS Royal Army Medical Corps
- Lt. Douglas Neil Kennedy, Royal Defence Corps
- Lt. Walter Stewart Kennedy, Royal Field Artillery
- Lt. Louis Kenny, Royal Field Artillery
- Temp Lt. Robert Kerr, Royal Army Ordnance Corps
- Capt. William Watson Killby
- Lt. Harold William Kimberley, London Regiment
- Regimental Sergeant Maj. Albert Arthur Kingdon, Bedfordshire Regiment
- Quartermaster and Lt. Charles Kingston, Royal Army Medical Corps
- Isabel Lace-Pritchard, Queen Mary's Army Auxiliary Corps
- Lt.-Col. George Lambie, late Trinidad Light Infantry
- Capt. Francis Stephen Lanigan-O'Keefe, Royal Dublin Fusiliers
- Temp Capt. Rawdon Hastings St. Barbe Laurie, Royal Army Service Corps
- Quartermaster and Capt. William Laurie, Royal Army Service Corps
- Lt. Andrew Lavery, Durham Light Infantry
- Temp Lt. Robert Edward Lawler
- Capt. Gray Leaver
- Lt. Albert Victor Lee, Cheshire Regiment, Special Reserve
- Maj. George Lee, Royal Artillery
- Lt. Thomas Goulton Leonard, Royal Garrison Artillery
- Temp Capt. Charles William Leslie, Royal Army Service Corps
- Temp Capt. Cecil Oliver Gresham Leveson-Gower, Royal Army Service Corps
- Jeanne Athol Levy, Women's Legion
- Lt. Orpheus William Henry Lewis, Royal Garrison Artillery
- Capt. Patrick Lindop, Army Pay Department
- Quartermaster and Capt. Albert Arthur Lippold, Royal Army Medical Corps
- Beatrice Ethel Lithiby, Unit Administrator, Queen Mary's Army Auxiliary Corps
- Temp 2nd Lt. Thomas London, Royal Army Service Corps
- Temp Lt. Charles Rawson Longbotnam
- Capt. Ernest Victor Longworth
- Temp Capt. John Charles Hampden Lucy, Royal Army Service Corps
- Lt. Anthony Mario Ludovici, Royal Field Artillery
- Temp Capt. Charles Hope Lumley, South Lancashire Regiment
- Lt. Charles Ernest Lumsden, Royal Army Service Corps
- Temp Maj. Henry Edward Lyons
- Lt. Daniel Archibald McAlister, Shropshire Royal Horse Artillery
- Capt. John McAvoy, Bedfordshire Regiment
- Henrietta Sutherland McColl, Unit Administrator, Queen Mary's Army Auxiliary Corps
- Squadron Sergeant Maj. John Smith McCulloch, Royal Army Service Corps
- Capt. Allen Fraser MacDonald, Special Reserve
- Temp Lt. Ewen William Charles MacDonald, Royal Army Ordnance Corps
- Quartermaster and Maj. James McDonald, Welsh Regiment
- Capt. James McDonald, Royal Army Ordnance Corps
- Temp Capt. Robert Parker MacDonald
- Lt. Alfred McDougall, Royal Engineers
- Capt. Walter McIver
- Lt. Robert James McKay DSO MC Argyll and Sutherland Highlanders
- Temp Capt. George McKechnie
- Temp Capt. Robert McLaren, Army Pay Department
- Capt. and Bt. Maj. Alan McLean, Inns of Court Officers Training Corps
- Temp Lt. James McLeish, Royal Engineers
- Capt. Creighton William McClellan, Royal Highlanders
- Temp Capt. Kenrick James McMullen, Royal Engineers
- Capt. Agnew Main MacPhall, Royal Berkshire Regiment (Special Reserve)
- Temp Lt. Arthur Manico, Royal Army Service Corps
- Grace Mann, Deputy Administrator, Queen Mary's Army Auxiliary Corps
- Lt. Thomas Clifford Maun, Royal Engineers
- Quartermaster and Capt. James Walter Mansfield
- Lt. Frederick James Marohant, Army Pay Department
- Lt. Horace George Mason, Royal Garrison Artillery (Special Reserve)
- Lt. Denis MacPherson Masters, Royal Garrison Artillery
- Capt. Frederick William Matheson, Unattd. List
- George Alfred Mathews MC Royal Army Ordnance Corps
- Lt. Clement Norman Matthews, late London Regiment
- Temp Lt. Henry George Meadows, Royal Army Ordnance Corps
- Temp Capt. Francis George Mierrett, Royal Engineers
- Maj. Harry Francis Metcalfe, Royal Fusiliers
- Temp Capt. Percy Kynaston Metcalfe, Royal Army Service Corps
- Capt. George Middleton, Army School Department
- Lt. Sam Midgeley
- Temp Maj. Alfred George Miles, Royal Engineers
- Temp Capt. John Smith Tindal Mill, Royal Engineers
- Temp Lt. Ernest Norman Milliken, Royal Army Service Corps
- Capt. Harry Sturgess Mills Army School Department
- Maj. James Clymo Milton, East Lancashire Regiment
- Margaret Florence Mitchell, Unit Administrator, Queen Mary's Army Auxiliary Corps
- Lt. William Alfred James Mitchell, Royal Garrison Artillery
- Capt. Archibald Patrick Moir, T.F. Res
- Temp Capt. George Molineux, Royal Army Service Corps
- Capt. Malcolm Matthew Moncrieff
- Lt. John Bird Monk, Honourable Artillery Company
- Marjorie Moor, Unit Administrator, Queen Mary's Army Auxiliary Corps
- Temp Maj. Harold Mead Moore MC Royal Army Service Corps
- Quartermaster and Capt. Richard William Moore, Norfolk Regiment
- Capt. William Arthur Moore, Rifle Brigade (Special Reserve)
- Lt. Arthur Ernest Moreton, King's Own Scottish Borderers
- Quartermaster Sergeant Arthur Richard Morgan, Royal Engineers
- Temp Lt. John Scammell Morgan
- Capt. Phillip Sydney Morgan, Royal Army Veterinary Corps
- Maj. Sydney Cope Morgan, South Wales Borderers
- Warrant Officer Edward Morris, Army School Department
- Lt. Frederick Herbert Morris, Cheshire Regiment
- Rev. Patrick Joseph Morris, Royal Army Chaplains' Department
- Temp 2nd Lt. William Henry Morris, Royal Army Service Corps
- Lt. George Bowen Morton, Royal Field Artillery
- Temp Capt. Robert Connell Morton, Royal Engineers
- Capt. Harry George Mumford, London Regiment
- Quartermaster and Maj. Alfred Munday, Royal Army Service Corps
- Dorothy Sarah Murgatroyd, Deputy Administrator, Queen Mary's Army Auxiliary Corps
- Maj. Francis Philip Sidney Murphy, Liverpool Regiment
- Temp Capt. Francis Joseph Nash, Army Pay Department
- Quartermaster and Maj. David Nelson DCM Lothians and Border Horse
- Temp Lt. Giles Fendall Nwto, Royal Artillery
- Lt. Herbert John Nias
- Christabel Nicholson, Women's Legion
- Temp Capt. Norwood Nicholson, Royal Army Service Corps
- Temp Capt. Edwin Brownrigg Noyes
- Temp Lt. Frank Oates, Royal Engineers
- Quartermaster and Capt. Joseph Oborn, Machine Gun Corps
- Temp Capt. James Matthew O'Brien, West African Medical Corps
- Lt. Edward Henslow Orchard, Royal Garrison Artillery
- Temp Capt. Robert Bruce Hamilton Ottley, Royal Army Service Corps
- Jean Broomfield Wier Ovens, Asst. Administrator, Queen Mary's Army Auxiliary Corps
- Capt. Harold James Page, Royal Artillery
- Maj. Basil Owen Palmer, Border Regiment
- Ellen Amelia Palmer, Unit Administrator, Queen Mary's Army Auxiliary Corps
- Temp Capt. Frank Richard Paramor
- 2nd Lt. Hugh Love Parker, Cameron Highlanders
- Temp Capt. Thomas Mayor Parker, Royal Army Veterinary Corps
- Capt. Wilfred Watson Parker, London Regiment
- Dorothy Phoebe Parkee, Unit Administrator, Queen Mary's Army Auxiliary Corps
- Hon Capt. Herbert Passmore
- Sub Conductor Tom Payne, Royal Army Ordnance Corps
- Temp Capt. Henry John Pearse, Royal Army Service Corps
- Lt. Charles Peart, Royal Artillery
- Lt. Vector Newton Peck, Gordon Highlanders
- 2nd Lt. John Ronald Peddie
- Lt. Albert William Peel, T.F. Res
- Lt. Hamilton Francis Moore Pellatt MC Royal Irish Rifles
- Temp Lt. Evelyn Polly, Royal Army Service Corps
- Capt. Alexander Philip Percival, South Wales Borderers
- Capt. Lewis Arthur Perkins
- Violet Perry, Superintendent, Women's Legion
- Maj. Cecil Wyburn Peters, late 4th Hussars
- Capt. Harry Vaughan Philips
- Temp Capt. Horace Stock Phillips, Royal Engineers
- Lt. James Charles Joseph Phillips, Royal Army Service Corps
- Temp Capt. William Austin Phillips, London Regiment
- Temp Capt. Henry Croly Phipps, Royal Army Service Corps
- Temp Capt. John Russell Pickering, Royal Army Service Corps
- Capt. Henry Pige-Leschallas
- Temp Lt. Arthur William Pinder, Royal Army Service Corps
- Temp Capt. Arthur Pinsent, Royal Engineers
- Temp Capt. Claude Bernard Meister Platt
- Temp Capt. Sydney Frank Platt
- Capt. Humphrey Pleydell-Bouverie, 5th Dragoon Guards
- Capt. Elisha John Pocock, Army Pay Department
- Temp Quartermaster and Capt. Richard William Poole, late
- Capt. Samuel Lowry Porter
- Temp Lt. George Henry Draper Post, Royal Army Service Corps
- Temp Lt. George Teevan Power
- Capt. Frank Trevor Power
- Maj. Lynch Hamilton Prioleau, late Manchester Regiment
- Capt. Roger Cecil Procter, London Regiment
- Lt.-Col. Edwin Quayle, Royal Army Medical Corps (Lanc. Volunteer)
- Lt. Abraham Quick
- Quartermaster and Capt. John James Quinn, Royal Army Service Corps
- Temp Lt. George John Rackham
- Lt. Alexander Macpherson Rait, Royal Field Artillery
- Capt. James Ellwood Ramsdale
- Temp Capt. Richard Walter Kimbal Randall, Army Pay Department
- Lt. Arthur Richard Rawlinson, York and Lancaster Regiment
- Temp Capt. Oswald Theodore Rayner
- Lt. Alfred Read, London Regiment
- Lt. Stefan Redlich, Royal Garrison Artillery
- Temp Lt. Baron Noel Reed, Royal Army Ordnance Corps
- Lt. Harry Rees, Royal Artillery
- Capt. Edward Charles Reeves, Hampshire Regiment
- Lt. Isaac William Reid, Royal Engineers
- Temp Lt. James Reid, Royal Army Ordnance Corps
- Quartermaster and Capt. Thomas Reilly, Royal Field Artillery
- Maj. and Bt. Lt.-Col. David Rennet Royal Army Medical Corps
- Temp Capt. James Bruce Reynish, Royal Engineers
- Temp Capt. Philip George Reynolds, Royal Army Service Corps
- Lt. R.M. Province Wellesley Richards, Volunteer Rifles
- Temp Capt. Joseph Ricketts, Royal Engineers
- Capt. Douglas Errington Riddell
- Temp Lt. Robert Stacey Marks Rigby, Machine Gun Corps
- Maj. Albert Henry Rishworth, East Yorkshire Regiment
- Temp Lt. Adam McCall Robertson, Royal Field Artillery
- Temp Lt. George William Pearson Roberts, Royal Army Service Corps
- Regimental Sergeant Maj. Talbot Vivian Waymen Roberts MC South Lancashire Regiment
- Lt. Frederick William Robertson, Royal Field Artillery
- Margaret Agnes Josepha Robertson, Deputy Administrator, Queen Mary's Army Auxiliary Corps
- Lt. William Henry Robinson
- Capt. Alfred Lyttleton Roche, Royal Scots Fusiliers
- Temp Lt. Gilbert Rogers
- Lilian May Rogers, Asst. Administrator, Queen Mary's Army Auxiliary Corps
- Temp Lt. William Aldrich Rogers, Royal Army Service Corps
- Temp Capt. Charles Bertram Rolfe, Royal Army Service Corps
- Temp Lt. Norman Frank Rose, Machine Gun Corps
- Temp 2nd Lt. Cecil Rosling, Royal Engineers
- Temp Lt. William Sydney Rouse
- Temp Capt. James Stewart Rowe, Royal Army Service Corps
- Capt. Wilfred Aubrey Rowe
- Temp Lt. Charles James Rowlatt, Rifle Brigade
- Lt. Frederick George Rowlatt, East Kent Yeomanry
- Lt. Albert Rycroft, Royal Artillery
- Capt. Frederick Rycroft, Royal Artillery
- Judith Mary Sandberg, Unit Administrator, Queen Mary's Army Auxiliary Corps
- Maj. William Wellington Sandeman, Royal Sussex Regiment
- Lt. Archie Sandercock, Royal Garrison Artillery
- Grace Louise Sanders, Deputy Cnr., Queen Mary's Army Auxiliary Corps
- Maj. Thomas Alexander Gardner Sangster, Leinster Regiment
- Temp Capt. Frank Robert Saward, Royal Engineers
- Lt. George Ernest Scholes, Royal Engineers
- Lt. Arthur Frank Scott, Lincolnshire Yeomanry
- Temp Hon Lt. Eustace Edward Scott, Royal Army Veterinary Corps
- Lt. George Alfred Scott, Gloucestershire Regiment
- Capt. Keith Stanley Malcolm Scott Royal Engineers
- Lt. Walter Nedham Scott, Lincolnshire Regiment
- Temp Lt. Harry Stanley Scrivener, Royal Army Service Corps
- Lt. William George Scudamore, Royal Engineers
- Capt. Arthur Mackenzie Searle, Royal Engineers
- Rev. John Seeley, Royal Army Chaplains' Department
- Quartermaster and Capt. Archibald Joseph Sergeant, Royal Engineers
- Temp Maj. Boydell Shallis, Royal Engineers
- Temp Capt. Richard Shannon
- Temp Lt. Ernest John Sharland, Duke of Cornwall's Light Infantry
- Temp 2nd Lt. Frederick Francis Sharles
- Temp Quartermaster and Lt. James William Shaw, Royal Fusiliers
- Quartermaster and Maj. Walter Shean, Royal Artillery
- Temp Capt. Alan Douglas Edward Shefford
- Capt. Harry Neal Shelmerdine MC Royal Field Artillery
- Temp Lt. Harry Gordon Shelton, Royal Army Service Corps
- Capt. Oswald Clive Graeme Shields Royal Army Medical Corps
- Elizabeth Mildred Shillington, Women's Legion
- Lt. Alfred George Shore, Royal Dublin Fusiliers
- Temp Quartermaster and Lt. Charles Frederick Showell, Royal Garrison Artillery
- Capt. Alan Lachlan Silverwood-Cope, East Kent Regiment
- Temp Capt. William Edward Simmett, Royal Engineers
- Lt. Robert John Sinclair, King's Own Scottish Borderers
- Maj. and Riding Master Thomas Sinneld, Royal Army Service Corps
- Lt. Frank Sturdy Sinnatt
- Lt. Allan Skelton, West Kent Yeomanry
- Quartermaster and Capt. Donald Woodford Smith, Royal Garrison Artillery
- Lt. Harold James Smith
- Quartermaster and Capt. James William Smith, Royal Army Service Corps
- Mary Amelia Smith, Unit Administrator, Queen Mary's Army Auxiliary Corps
- Capt. Robert Adam Smith, late Royal Highlanders
- Temp 2nd Lt. Soloman Charles Kaines Smith
- Quartermaster and Capt. Thomas Joseph Smith, Middlesex Regiment
- Quartermaster and Capt. Andrew Spence MC Royal Scots Fusiliers
- Capt. John Charles Spence
- Capt. Lockart James Spence Royal Army Medical Corps
- Temp Lt. Gerald Theodosius Leigh Spencer
- Quartermaster Sergeant Richard Spillane, Royal Army Ordnance Corps
- Capt. Edwin Gardiner Spinks, Royal Army Ordnance Corps
- Temp 2nd Lt. John Kerr Spittal
- Capt. Walter Ernest Squire, Royal Army Medical Corps
- Temp Lt. Leicester St. Clair Ford, Royal Army Service Corps
- Norah Blake Stack, Controller, Queen Mary's Army Auxiliary Corps
- 2nd Lt. Edward Stafford, Durham Light Infantry
- Capt. Herbert Vernon Stanley MC Royal Army Medical Corps
- Temp Quartermaster and Lt. Robert Ernest Steggall
- Lt. Carl David Stelling, London Regiment
- Temp Capt. John Stericker, Royal Engineers
- Temp Maj. Angus Matheson Stewart, Royal Engineers
- Lt. John Henry George Stewart, Royal Engineers
- Iza Stitt, Deputy Administrator, Queen Mary's Army Auxiliary Corps
- Temp Maj. Archibald Stodart-Walker FRCP Royal Army Medical Corps
- Temp Capt. Hubert Leslie Stringer, Royal Engineers
- Temp Quartermaster and Capt. Harry Stubbs, Royal Army Service Corps
- Capt. Charles Sturgess, Oxfordshire Yeomanry
- Lt. Thomas Asquith Shallow, Royal Garrison Artillery
- Quartermaster and Lt. Henry James Swinerd, Royal Artillery
- Temp Lt. Norman Hillyard Swinstead, Royal Engineers
- Temp Capt. Edward Dansy Taylor, Royal Army Service Corps
- Lt. Harry Taylor, Royal Engineers
- Temp Lt. Archibald Angus Templeton, Royal Highlanders
- Capt. Arthur Henry Thomas Royal Army Medical Corps
- Capt. Harold Miles Thomas
- Capt. Alexander Brackstone Thomson, East Kent Regiment
- Temp Lt. Alfred Louis Thomson, Royal Army Service Corps
- Lt. Frederick Charles Thomson, Scottish Horse
- Lt. Stanley Russell Thornbery, Royal Army Service Corps
- Capt. Frederick John Thome Royal Army Medical Corps
- Temp Lt. Harold John Thorp, Royal Engineers
- Temp Lt. Alan Dorrington Thurstan, Royal Engineers
- Lt. Frank Walter Tipping, Oxfordshire and Buckinghamshire Light Infantry
- Temp Capt. Frederick William Tisley, Royal Engineers
- Capt. Harry Stoeker Titchener, Royal Army Ordnance Corps
- Temp Lt. Alexander Todd, Royal Field Artillery
- Lt. Stanley Charles Tomkins CMG Special Reserve
- Temp Capt. William Toms, South Lancashire Regiment
- Temp Quartermaster and Capt. John Tonkinson, Royal Army Medical Corps
- Temp Lt. Francis Edwin Friday Tookey
- Quartermaster and Capt. John Topliss DCM Royal Army Service Corps
- Temp Lt. Robert Travill, Royal Army Ordnance Corps
- Lt. Richard Trenam MC Northumberland Fusiliers
- Lt. Thomas St. Vincent Wallace Troubridge, King's Royal Rifle Corps
- Lt. Frederick James Tucker
- Lt. Hubert Thorold Tulloch, Royal Field Artillery
- Capt. George Patrick D'Arcy Gregory Tunks, Leicestershire Regiment
- Temp Capt. Thomas Montigomerie Turnbull, Royal Army Service Corps
- Temp Lt. Alfred Cyril Turner
- Temp Capt. Bernard Wilfred Turner, Royal Engineers
- Temp Lt. Henry Edmund Guise Tyndale, King's Royal Rifle Corps
- Lt. William Tyson, Essex Regiment
- Temp 2nd Lt. Reginald Edward Underwood
- 2nd Lt. John Albert Austin Upham, Royal Guernsey Light Infantry
- Temp Quartermaster and Capt. Frederick Charles Vassie, Royal Garrison Artillery
- Lt. Richard Henry Vernon, Dorsetshire Regiment
- Temp Capt. George Bridges Wade, Royal Engineers
- Temp Capt. William Alfred Wale, Seaforth Highlanders
- Lt. Austine Harington Walker, Royal Field Artillery
- Temp Capt. Samuel Walker
- Capt. Weeper Kenneth Walter, Yorkshire Regiment
- Sergeant Maj. Hector Wark, Royal Field Artillery
- Lt. John Lean Wark
- Capt. Claude Alfred Reuben Warren, Argyll and Sutherland Highlanders
- Lt. Henry William Warren
- Edith Mary Warrior, Unit Administrator, Queen Mary's Army Auxiliary Corps
- Temp Capt. George Frederick Mary Waters, Royal Engineers
- Quartermaster and Capt. William John Watkins, Gloucestershire Regiment
- Temp Capt. Frederick Whittaker Watson, East Kent Regiment
- Temp Capt. Noel Sutcliffe Ogilvy Watson, Royal Engineers
- Temp Lt. William Charles Watson, 4th Res. R. Cav
- Quartermaster and Capt. Frederick John Webb, Royal Engineers
- Maj. Henry Smith Webb, Royal Army Medical Corps
- Quartermaster and Capt. Thomas Webb, Royal Army Service Corps
- Temp Maj. Thomas Duncan Weir, Royal Engineers
- Maj. Sidney Chaytor Welchman, South Staffordshire Regiment
- Lt. Henry Bensley Wells, Royal Artillery
- Temp Capt. Stanley Walter Wells, Royal Army Service Corps
- Temp 2nd Lt. George Henry Westoott, Royal Army Service Corps
- Capt. Norman Whatley
- Temp Maj. Bruce Gordon White, Royal Engineers
- Temp Capt. William Edward de Bagulegh Whittaker
- Capt. William Whittington, Yorkshire Regiment
- Capt. Charles Warwick Whitworth, West Yorkshire Regiment
- Temp Capt. Harold Herbert Wiles, Labour Corps
- Capt. Dennison Alfred Wilkins, East Kent Regiment
- Temp Lt. Harry Willes, Royal Garrison Artillery
- Temp Lt. Charles Williams, Royal Engineers
- Temp Lt. Harold Williams, Royal Army Service Corps
- Temp Maj. John Montague Williams, Royal Engineers
- Temp Lt. Leonard Lowther Williams MC Royal Engineers
- Lt. Richard Barclay Williams, Royal Engineers
- Hon Maj. Harry Richard James Willis, late 7th Dragoon Guards
- Temp Lt. Frederick William Willmott
- Aphra Phyllis Wilson, Asst. Administrator, Queen Mary's Army Auxiliary Corps
- Temp Capt. John Wilson
- Quartermaster and Capt. William Robert Wilson, South Wales Borderers
- Temp Capt. Arthur Bluett Winch
- Quartermaster and Capt. James Moffet Windrum, Royal Guernsey Militia
- Temp Capt. Henry Parr Winstanley, Royal Army Service Corps
- Lt. James Daniel Wolff, Royal Artillery
- Quartermaster and Lt. Fred Wombwell, Bedfordshire Regiment
- Temp Capt. Alexander Wood, Northumberland Fusiliers
- Edith Francis Wood, Unit Administrator, Queen Mary's Army Auxiliary Corps
- Capt. Charles Reynolds Woodruff, Royal Army Medical Corps
- Temp Capt. Reginald George Woolley
- Temp Capt. Charles Gordon Woolway, Royal Engineers
- Temp Capt. Ernest Harry Woosley, Royal Army Ordnance Corps
- Temp Capt. Herbert Wootton, Huntingdonshire Cyclist Battalion
- Temp Capt. Herbert Arthur Wootton
- Temp Capt. John Armour Wotherspoon, Royal Engineers
- Temp Capt. Charles Wright, Royal Army Ordnance Corps
- Temp Capt. Sydney Arthur Wright, Royal Army Service Corps
- Maj. Thomas Kendall Wright, West Riding Regiment
- Lt. George Ernest Yarrow, Northumberland Fusiliers
- Temp Capt. Thomas Jenkin Yorwerth, Royal Army Service Corps
- Temp Lt. Bertram John Young
- Temp Hon Lt. Charlie Young, Royal Army Veterinary Corps
- Capt. Harry Robert Young, late Royal Engineers
- Capt. Richard Horton Young
- Capt. John Stirling Yule, Royal Field Artillery

Canadian Forces

- Maj. Christopher George Seymour Bagot, Canadian Forestry Corps
- Lt. Martin Surney Gaine, Alberta Regiment
- Capt. Ivor Castle
- Lt. Thomas Walter Clarke, Canadian Railway Troops
- Lt. Alexander Cox, Saskatchewan Regiment
- Lt. Thomas Dickson Currie, Canadian Railway Troops
- Hon Lt. Charles Townley Curry
- Quartermaster and Hon Capt. Harry Van Norman Duggan, 1st Central Ontario Regiment
- Capt. John Edward Evans, Canadian Army Pay Corps
- Lt. Thomas Heaton Gallon, Manchester Regiment
- Lt. William James Gault, Canadian Field Artillery
- Lt. George E. Gibson, Canadian Army Service Corps
- Quartermaster Arthur Douglas Gordon, Saskatchewan Regiment
- Temp Maj. Stewart Gordon, Canadian Forestry Corps
- Quartermaster and Hon Capt. Walter Hardman, Canadian Railway Troops
- Regimental Sergeant Maj. Harry Harrison, Canadian Artillery
- Lt. Frederick Morgan Holden, Alberta Regiment
- Capt. Hansord Hora, Canadian Forestry Corps
- Quartermaster and Hon Capt. John Hutcheson, Canadian Army Medical Corps
- Regimental Sergeant Maj. Samuel Jones Jaminson, 1st Central Ontario Regiment
- Hon Lt. Edwin William Jolmson
- Temp Lt. William Henry Jones, Canadian Army Service Corps
- Company Sergeant Maj. William McDerment, Canadian Army Dental Corps
- Temp Capt. James McLean, Canadian Forestry Corps
- Hon Capt. Joseph Charles Perry, British Columbia Regiment
- Temp Maj. William Henry Rice, Canadian Forestry Corps
- Lt. George William Robinson, Manchester Regiment
- Temp Lt. John Clifford Seybold, Canadian Army Pay Corps
- Lt. John Sheff DCM West Ontario Regiment
- Temp Lt. George Wilmot Rae Simpson, Canadian Army Pay Corps
- Staff Quartermaster Sergeant Andrew Gibson Sinclair, Saskatchewan Regiment
- Temp Capt. John Howard Slayter, Canadian Army Medical Corps
- Hon Lt. Stanley Oscar Smith
- Lt. Frank Aldham Smythe, East Ontario Regiment
- Lt. Harry Joseph Starratt, Canadian Cyclist Battalion
- Lt. Harry Wilson Sutherland MM East Ontario Regiment
- Temp Lt. William Bryson Thomas, Canadian Army Pay Corps
- Lt. Davil Holland Tomlinson, Alberta Regiment
- Lt. William Hamilton Vernon, Canadian Royal Artillery
- Lt. Wilfred Wellington Wilson, Alberta Regiment
- Quartermaster and Hon Maj. Edwin Sydney Woodiwiss, Canadian Army Medical Corps

Australian Imperial Forces

- Lt. Robert Lancelot Andrewes, 26th Australian Infantry Battalion
- Capt. Mark Berryman, 2nd Australia Division
- Capt. William Reginald Bingle, 39th Australian Infantry Battalion
- Hon Capt. Archibald du Bourg Broad
- Hon Capt. Joseph Hector Brown
- Lt. Phillip Caro, 2nd Australia Tunneling Company
- Capt. Gerald Mossman Carr, 24th Australian Infantry Battalion
- Quartermaster and Hon Lt. Arthur Charlesworth, Australian Army Medical Corps
- Lt. Harry Crome, Australian Army Pay Corps
- Capt. David Robert Crooks
- Lt. Cyril Davy, 15th Australian Infantry Battalion
- Lt. Cyril Talbot Docker, 18th Australian Infantry Battalion
- Quartermaster and Hon Capt. John Raymond Drummond, Australian Army Medical Corps
- Lt. Theodore Phillip Grace, 56th Australian Infantry Battalion
- Lt. Ernest Virtue Hall, 3rd Australia Divisional Trn
- Capt. Harold Stanley-George Hall
- Lt. Reginald Stafford Healy, 54th Australia Inf Battalion
- Lt. John Herbert Wallace Henry
- Lt. William Malcolm Herriott, Australian Imperial Force
- Lt. Harry Claude Ikin
- Capt. Alfred James Jessep, 5th Australia Divisional Engineers
- Quartermaster and Hon Lt. Frederick Nicholas Laird
- Quartermaster and Hon Capt. Frederick Ernest Lanipe
- Lt. Melville Cecil Langslow, Australian Army Pay Corps
- Lt. Eric Nathan Samuel Lawrence, Army Provost Corps
- Lt. Theodore Harold Levy, Australian Army Provost Corps
- Capt. Edmund James Long, Australian Army Provost Corps
- Capt. Kenneth McLellan, 11th Australian Infantry Battalion
- Capt. Reginald Harry Mohr, Australian Army Pay Corps
- Quartermaster and Hon Capt. Reginald William Murphy
- Quartermaster and Hon Capt. John Francis Stuart Murray MC Australian Army Medical Corps
- Temp Capt. Alexander Newlands
- Hon Capt. Harold Norris
- Quartermaster and Hon Capt. Cecil Stanley Price, Australian Army Medical Corps
- Lt. Vernon Edward Robley, Australian Army Pay Corps
- Capt. Thomas Frederick Rossiter, 23rd Australian Infantry Battalion
- Lt. Miles Stanforth Cator Smith, 44th Australian Infantry Battalion
- Capt. Michael Sorensen
- Lt. Charles Edward Spittal, Australian Army Pay Corps
- Capt. Robert MowbrayWinston Thirkell, 12th Australian Infantry Battalion
- Capt. Arthur George Tyler, Australian Army Postal Corps
- Capt. Douglas Bingham Wheeler
- Lt. Roy Vincent Wilson

New Zealand Forces

- Capt. William Atwell, NZ Service Corps
- 2nd Lt. Norman Bell, NZ Army Service Corps
- Capt. Charles Henry Booth, Auckland Regiment
- Maj. John Thomas Bosworth, NZ Service Corps
- Capt. Arthur William Brocks
- Maj. Henry Harwood Brown, NZ Service Corps
- Capt. William Caesar Sarsfield Colclough, NZ Service Corps
- Maj. Albert Arthur Corrigan
- Capt. David Cecil Wallace Cossgrove
- Maj. Walter Crowther
- Capt. William Dobson
- Lt. David Alexander Ewen
- Capt. Frederick Charles Gentry
- Maj. William Richmond Hursthouse, NZ Defence Staff
- Capt. David Nathan Isaacs, NZ Medical Corps
- Lt. William Jack, NZ Medical Corps
- Maj. Henry Jolly
- Capt. James Robert Kirk, Wellington Regiment
- Capt. Edward Cronin Lowe NZ Army Medical Corps
- Rev Edward Elliott Maiden, NZ Chaplains' Department
- Capt. James Seaton Martin, NZ Army Pay Corps
- Maj. Robert Saxon Matthews, NZ Service Corps
- Capt. Samuel Mellows
- Maj. Oden Moller
- Maj. James Alfred Northcote
- Maj. Henry Charles Nutsford, NZ Service Corps
- Capt. Matthew Henry Oram
- Lt. Henry William Osborne, Canterbury Regiment
- Maj. William Haddon Pettit, NZ Medical Corps
- Capt. Lawrence Victor Porteous, Wellington Regiment
- Capt. William Pryor
- Lt. Arthur Gilbert Quartley, Auckland Regiment
- Capt. Henry Joseph Redmond, NZ Service Corps
- 2nd Lt. Arthur James Ridler, NZ Field Artillery
- Maj. Thomas Hazlett Ringland
- Maj. Norman John Rishworth, NZ Defence Staff
- Maj. David Brett Shand
- Capt. George Walker, NZ Service Corps
- Rev Walter Sim Winton, NZ Chaplains' Department
- Capt. Roy Wilds Fry Wood, Auckland Regiment

South African Forces

- Capt. Gerald Spencer Coghlan, SA Medical Corps
- Lt. Norman Nuttall Ellis, SA Postal Corps
- Lt. Arthur Reginald Knibbs, SA Infantry
- Capt. Edward Alder Legge DCM SA Reserve Brigade
- Quartermaster and Hon Lt.-Col. George Merritt, SA Medical Corps
- Lt. William Ernest Tucker, SA Infantry
- Staff Sergeant Maj. John Hamilton Walker, SA Infantry

Newfoundland Forces

- Capt. Hugh A. Anderson, O.F.
- Capt. Cyril C. Duley, Royal Newfoundland Regiment
- Capt. James M. Howley, HQ Staff
- Capt. Frederick W. Marshall, O.F.
- Capt. J. J. O'Grady, Royal Newfoundland Regiment
- Quartermaster and Hon Capt. Herbert A. R. Outerbridge, Royal Newfoundland Regiment
- 2nd Lt. William Reeves
- Lt. Herbert M. Winter, Royal Newfoundland Regiment

=== Civil Division ===
British India

- Walter Charles Abel, Superintendent, Government Printing Press, Allahabad, United Provinces
- Chidambara Rajagopala Aiyar, Assistant Controller of War Accounts
- Alfred Alexander, Manager, Buckingham Mills, Madras
- Margaret Alexander, Patna Branch of the Combined Red Cross and St. John Ambulance Associations, Bihar and Orissa
- Eleanor Florence Anderson, Honorary Secretary, Monro Soldiers Canteen
- Maud Anson, Comforts for the Troops Fund, North-West Frontier Province
- William Staveley Armour, Superintendent Publicity Bureau, Allahabad, United Provinces
- M. R. Ry. Rao Bahadar Tiruvalyangudi Vijayaraghava Achariyar Avargal, Diwan of Cochin, Madras
- Rai Sahib Raj Bahadur, Chairman of the Etah\Municipal Board, United Provinces
- Augustus Baker, Engineer, Bombay Mint
- Christine Baldwin, Red Cross Assooation, North-West Frontier Province
- Helen Balthazar, Red Cross Depot, Rangoon, Burma
- Walter Cecil Bamford, Deputy Superintendent, Telegraph Engineering, Central India
- Constance Bewley, Secretary, Ladies War Fund, Dacca, Bengal
- Cissie Booker, Voluntary Worker, YMCA, Jubbulpore, Central Provinces
- The Rev. John Jennings Dingle Borlase Junior Chaplain, Indian Ecclesiastical Estab., St. Mark's Church, Civil and Military Station, Bangalore, Mysore State
- Sharnalata Bose, Dacca Branch of the Lady Carmichael Bengal Women's War Fund, Bengal
- Second Lt. Charles William Bowles, Indian Defence Force, State Engineer, Patiala, Punjab
- The Honourable Finetta Madeline Julia Bruce, Red Cross Association, North-West Frontier Province
- Florence Buist, Red Cross Association, Rawalpindi, Punjab
- Kathleen Byrne, Lady Superintendent, of the Dehra Dun Nursing Division of the St. John Ambulance Brigade, United Provinces
- Sarah Cain, Secretary of the Dummagudem Red Cross Centre, Godavari District, Madras
- Manijeh Sorabjee Capt., Bombay
- Mary Cartwright, Red Cross Depots, Anantapur and Tinnevelly, Madras
- Gertrude Caseon, Red Cross Depot, Ambala, Punjab
- Babu Bishan Chand, Deputy Collector, Etawah, United Provinces
- Lala Ram Chandra, Indian Civil Service, Assistant Commissioner, Lyallpur, Punjab
- George Alfred Chapman, Station, Master, Quetta, Baluchistan
- Babu Sukumar Chatterjeej Provincial Civil Service, Sadar Sub-Divisional Officer, Pabna, Bengal
- Alice Ghatterton, Red Cross and St. John Ambulance Associations, Bangalore, Mysore State
- Babu Guru Charan de Chaudhuri, Extra Assistant Commissioner, Sylhet, Assam
- Hugh Cook Clark, Head Engineer, Calcutta Mint
- Reuben Arthur Clarke, Superintendent in charge, Central Telegraph Office, Simla and Delhi
- Edna Katherine Compton, Honorary Secretary of the Bangalore Soldiers Aid Committee, Mysore State
- Ethel Sophie Cox, Voluntary Worker, Church of England Institute for Soldiers, Bangalore, Mysore State
- Evelin Florence Conran Cox, Voluntary Worker, YMCA and Church of England Institute for Soldiers, Bangalore, Mysore State
- Babu Birendra Kishor Das, Superintendent, Athgarb State, Bihar and Orissa
- Capt. George Edward Dean, Indian Army Reserve of Officers, Inspector of Police, Assistant Recruiting Officer, United Provinces
- Rao Sahib Rukhmaji Mankoji Dhatrak, District Assistant Recruiting Officer, Amravati, Berar, Central Provinces
- Babu Jogesli Chandra putt, Provincial Civil Service, Sub-Divisional Officer, Gaibandha, Bengal
- Ernest Henry Dwane, Chief Accountant and Auditor, Nizams Guaranteed State Railway, Secunderabad, Hyderabad (Deccan)
- Khan Sahib Shaik Ebrahimji, Sind, Bombay
- Bhicaijee Ardeshir Engineer, Secretary to Seva Sedan, Bombay
- Evelyn Ewart, Indian Women's Branch of the Red Cross, North-West Frontier Province
- Edmund Eyres, Head of the firm of Messrs. E. Eyres. and Co., Bombay
- Rhoda Fagan, Organiser, Comforts for Soldiers, Bangalore, Mysore State
- Kenneth De Quincey Fink, Superintendent, Foreign and Political Department of the Government of India
- Eveline Firminger, St. John Ambulance Association, Calcutta, Bengal
- Elsie Beatrice Fisk, in charge of the Sandes Soldiers Home, Quetta Branch, Baluchistan
- Hubert St. Clair Freitas, Registrar, Office of the Private Secretary to His Excellency the Viceroy
- Frances Emily Frizelle, Red Cross and Comforts for Troops Funds, Rawalpindi, Punjab
- Alfred Joseph Fry, Electrician to the X-Ray Institute, Dehra Dun, United Provinces
- Sister Grace Elizabeth Gaiger, Nursing Sister, Cumballa War Hospital, Bombay
- Lala Ram Gopal, Accountant-General, Jind State, Punjab
- Rose Govindarajulu, Lady Medical Officer, Mysore Maternity Hospital, Bangalore City, Mysore State
- Hyginus Dominic Gracias, Assistant Controller of War Accounts
- Sarat Kumar Datta Gupta, Deputy Controller of War Accounts
- Capt. Alan Guthrie, Deputy Controller of Hides, Madras
- Louise Banks Gwyther, Comforts for the Troops Fund, Shillong, Assam
- Maung Myat Tha Gyaw, Regimental Sergeant Maj. TDM Provincial Civil Service, Extra Assistant, Commissioner (4th Grade), Sub-Divisional Officer, Taikkyi, Burma
- Ma Le Gyi, Red Cross Association, Amherst District, Burma
- George Thomas Hall, Deputy Superintendent, Survey of India (retired), and Municipal Commissioner, Civil and Military, Station, Bangalore, Mysore State
- William George Augustin Hanrahan, Acting General Secretary, St. John Ambulance Association
- Maj. Harold Maitland Haslehust, Indian Army Reserve of Officers, Assistant Superintendent, Bombay Police, lately Divisional Recruiting Officer for the Hyderabad State, Hyderabad (Deccan)
- Phyllis Hearn Monro, Soldiers Canteen, Amballa
- Margaret Herbert, Red Cross Association, Shillong, Assam
- Alice Hickley, Red Cross Association, Muzaffafpur District, Bihar and Orissa
- Arthur Denys Salusbury Highton, Agent, Bank of Bengal, Lucknow, United Province
- Ma E. Hmyin, Red Cross Association, Prome, Burma
- Eva Hogan Monro, Soldiers Canteen, Saharanpur
- Gladys Muriel Hunt, Honorary Secretary of the National Service Bureau, Bombay
- May Imrie, Voluntary Worker, YMCA, Jubbulpore, Central Province
- Capt. George Skinner Ingram, Business Manager, United Provinces War Journal, Allahabad, United Provinces
- John Rajaratnara Isaac, Gen. Secretary, YMCA, Bangalore, Mysore State
- Violet Jackson, Organiser, War Charities, Garo Hills, Assam
- Edith Alma Johnston, Red Cross and Comforts for the Troops Fund, Bhagalpur, Bihar and Orissa
- Rosalie Johnston, Secretary, Hyderabad Ladies War Relief Association, Hyderabad (Deccan)
- Pandit
- Satyanand Joshi, Assistant Editor, United Provinces War Journal, United Provinces
- Khan Sahib Yusuf Kanoo, Merchant of Bahrein, Persian Gulf
- Ruby Kempster, Honorary Secretary, Red Cross Association, Lucknow, United Provinces
- Joseph Abner Kendall, Superintendent, Central Red Cross Depot, Cawnpore, United Provinces
- Rose Alice Kenyon, Mateon of the Cumballa War Hospital, Bombay
- Khan Bahadur, Muhammad Abdul Karim Khan ISO Kundi of Gul Imam, Provincial Civil Service, District Judge, Dera Ismail Khan, North-West Frontier Province
- Ali Sher Khan, District Assisting Recruiting Officer, Saugor, Central Provinces
- Nawb Allahdad Khan, Alizai, of Dera Ismail Khan, North-West Frontier Province
- Khan Bahadur Mir Ahmad Khan Arbab, Provincial Civil Service, retired Extra Assistant Commissioner of Landi Yarghajo, Peshawar, North-West Frontier Province
- Khan Bahadur Ghulam Qadir Khan, Munshi, Provincial Civil Service, Revenue Extra Assistant Commissioner at Dera Ismail Khan, North-West, Frontier Province
- Khan Sahib Jangul Khan, late acting Sardar of the Belkhel Musakhelsi, Baluchistan
- Khan Bahadur Sardar Mian Khan, Head of the Kurd tribe, Baluchistan
- Khwaja Muhammad Abdul Majid Khan, Provincial Civil Service, Extra Assistant Commissioner, Gurgaon, Punjab
- Khan Bahadur Shakar Khan, Jamaldini, Sarhaddar, Kacha, Baluchistan
- Kunwar Muhammad Ubaidullah Khan, Khan Bahadur, Honorary Magistrate of Dharampur in the Bulandshahr District, United Provinces
- Zaka-ud-din Khan, Provincial Civil Service, Extra Assistant Commissioner, Hissar, Punjab
- Ethelred Mary Knollys, Indian Com forts for the Troops Fund, Delhi
- Samuel Laver, Secunderabad, Hyderaabad (Deccan)
- Ellen Laville, Red Cross Depot, Mysore State
- Harriet Louise Lee, Voluntary War Worker, Bangalore, Mysore State
- Charles Lister, Bangalore Woollen, Cotton and Silk Mills Company, Mysore State
- Diogo Xavier Lobo, Officiating Treasury Officer, Bushire, Persian Gulf
- Francis James Loughlin, Postmaster, Peshawar, North-West Frontier Province
- Ethel Lowsley, Honorary Secretary to the Coimbatore Centre Of the Red Cross Association, Madras
- The Reverend Bernard Lucas, Gen. Secretary, South India District Committee of the London Missionary Society, Mysore State
- Agnes Edith Stewart MacIver, Red Cross Depot, Tinneveliy, Madras
- William George Mackay, Engineer, Bombay Mint
- Malcolm Ayers Mackenzie, Superintendent of Police, Hazaribagh, Bihar and Orissa
- Edith Mary Madeley, Joint Secretary of the Ladies Recreation Club, Madras
- Dinshaw Eduljee Mahawa, Superintendent, Parsi Division of the St. John Ambulance Brigade, Bombay
- Babu Kishen Lai Maheshri, Merchant, Dibrugarh, Assam
- Rai Bahadur Lala Harji Mai, Khana of Peshawar City, Municipal Commissioner, Banker and Mill-owner, North-West Frontier Province
- Babu Gangsin Marak, of Baghmara, Garo Hills, Assam
- Jloraha Nusserwanji Marker, Superintendent, Cosmopolitan Division of St. John Ambulance Brigade, Bombay
- Harry Ralph McHugh, Deputy Superintendent, Telegraph Engineering, 1st Class, Cawnpore, United Provinces
- Rao Sahib Antony Simon Gabriel Michael, Shipping Clerk, Office of Deputy Controller, Timber Supplies, Burma
- Lewis William Michael, Superintendent, Municipal Markets, Bombay City, Bombay
- Edith Agnes Ida Mignon, War Depot, Calcutta, Bengal
- Herbert Minson, Indian Civil Service, Under Secretary to the Government of the Suited Provinces
- Henry St. John Morrison, Deputy Superintendent of Police, First Grade, Bihar and Orissa
- Second Lt. Abul Lais Saad-ud-Din Muhammad, Assistant Recruiting Officer, Sylhet, Assam
- Lala Raj Narain, Executive Engineer, Etawah, United Provinces
- Lala Suraj Narayan, Provincial Civil Service, Extra Assistant Commissioner, Rohtak, Punjab
- Capt. Pandit Kashi Nath, Deputy Collector, United Provinces
- Alice Elizabeth Maud, Newton, Secretary, Ladies Branch, Joint War Committee, Mhow Centre, Central India
- Una O'Dwyer, Punjab
- John Ninian Oliphant, Deputy Conservator of Forests, Lakhimpur, United Provinces
- Rao Sahib Balkrishna Anant Palekar, District Assistant Recruiting Officer, South Ratnagiri, Bombay
- Ronald Parsons, Personal Assistant to the Military Secretary to His Excellency the Viceroy
- Babu Anirudha Patel, Superintendent of the Nayagarh State, Bihar and Orissa
- Maude Marion Phelps, Indian Comforte for the Troops Fund, Simla
- Mary Catherine de Rhé Philipe, Red Cross and Comforts for the Troops Fund, Larore, Punjab
- Amy Pocklington, Secretary of the Kashmir Red Cross Committee, Kashmir State
- Edith Powell, Red Cross Associations, Rawalpindi and Murree, Punjab
- Lala Sheo Prasad, of Bareilly, United Provinces
- May Pratt, War Depot, Calcutta, Bengal
- Rai Bahadur Lala Barkat Ram, Honorary Magistrate, Gujranwala, Punjab
- Mary Ellen Rankin, St. John Ambulance Association, Darjeeling, Bengal
- Richard Riley, Manager, Carnatic Mills, Madras
- Lilian Muriel, Rivett-Carnac Voluntary Worker, Church of England Institute for Soldiers, Bangalore, Mysore State
- Sister Janet Robertson, Nursing Sister, Cumballa War Hospital, Bombay
- John Joseph Fisher Rodericks, Presidency Postmaster, Calcutta, Bengal
- Honorary Capt. Rivers Thomas Rodgers, Indian Medical Department, Superintendent Indian Medical Department, Superintendent, Central Jail, Jubbulpore, Central Provinces
- Babu Niranjan Roy, Provincial Civil Service, Sadar Sub-Divisional Officer, Tippera, Bengal
- Rao Bahadur Keshavji Nathu, Sailor, Bombay
- Nell Sears, Monro Soldiers Canteen, Delhi
- Arthur Freakish Sells, Consul for Denmark and Head of the Bombay Branch of Messrs. Cox and Co., Bombay
- Khan Bahadur Mian Musharraf Shah, Kaka Khel, of Ziarat Kaka Sahib, Peshawar District, North-West Frontier Province
- Khan Bahadur Syed Mehr Shah Kharsin, Head of the Kharsins of Durg, Baluchistan
- Lt. Cyril Hay Shaw, Deputy Controller of War Accounts
- Maung Ba Shin, Barrister-at-Law, Rangoon, Burma
- Winifred Simpson, Bengal Women's War Fund Depot, Calcutta, Bengal
- Rai Amarpal Singh, Taluqdar of Adharganj, Dalippur, Partabgarh District, United Provinces
- Chaudhri Brij Raj Saran Singh, President, Sahanpur Recruiting Depot, Bulandshahr District, United Provinces
- Chaudhri Dhiri Singh, late Honorary District Assistant Recruiting Officer, Mainpuri District, United Provinces
- Honorary Ressaidar Chaudhri Nihal Singh, of Bijnor, United Provinces
- Bhai Gurbakhsh Singh, Executive Engineer, Public Works Department, Buildings and Roads Branch, Lahore, Punjab
- Subardar-Maj. and Honorary Capt. Hira Singh, Sardar Bahadur, Aide-de-Camp to His Honour the Lieutenant-Governor, Bihar and Orissa
- Rai Bahadur Bhai Lehna Singh, Provincial Civil Service, District Judge, Dera Ismail Khan, North-West Frontier Province
- Mary Sladen, Red Cross Associations, Muttra and Bareily, United Provinces
- Alexander Frederick Slater, Superintendent, Postal Workshops and Piess, Aligarh, United Provinces of Agra and Oudh
- Una Soames, Red Cross Association, Darrang, Assam
- Gertrude Stephenson, Red Cross and Comforts for the Troops Funds, Laiore, Punjab
- Thomas Smith Sterling, Professor, Presidency College, Calcutta, Bengal
- Lenna Mary Stratford, Chief Inspectress of Schools, Punjab
- Anne Smith Tait, Red Cross Association, Mysore State
- Mary Thaddeus, War Depot, Calcutta, Bengal
- Mary Powney Thompson, Red Cross and Comforts for the Troops Funds, Multan Division, Punjab
- Edith Tonkinson, Honorary Secretary, Burma Labour Corps Comforts Fund and the Sagaing Red Cross Branch, Burma
- Lucia Turnbull, Voluntary War Worker, Bombay
- Constance Henry Turner, War Clothing, and Comforts for the Troops Fund, Harbanswala Tea Estate, Dehra Dun, United Provinces
- Rao Sahib Govind Mahadeo Vaidya, Assistant Controller of War Accounts
- Edith Mary Vanes, in charge of the Wesleyan Soldiers Home and Club, Bangalore Mysore State
- Ardeshir Dosabhai Wadia, Bombay
- Hellen Stuart Waller-Senior, Red Cross Association, Mysore, Mysore State
- Margaret Jean Walter, Comforts for the Troops Fund, Dehra Dun
- Winifred Edith Walter, Lady Superintendent, Nursing Staff of Civil Hospital, Karachi, Sind, Bombay
- Edith Way, Secretary, Red Cross Association, Naini Tal, United Provinces
- Ida Willmore, Secretary of the Sind Women's Branch of the Imperial War Relief Fund, Sind, Bombay
- John Hughes Wilson VD Superintendent, Arrakan Commissioners Office, Burma
- Norah Woodall, Red Cross Depot, Peshawar, North-West Frontier Province

Dominion of New Zealand

- Alfred Montague Adams, for services as chief executive officer of the Munitions and Supplies Department
- Rachel Mary Barton, for services in connection with patriotic organisations
- Margaret Brown Blackwell, for services in connection with the Countess of Liverpool Fund for the New Zealand Expeditionary Force
- Hilda Bloonifield, for services in connection with the New Zealand Branch of the British Red Cross Society and the Order of St. John of Jerusalem and for the Victoria League
- Annie Elizabeth Blundell, for services in connection with the New Zealand Branch of the British Red Cross Society and Order of St. John of Jerusalem
- Janet Bowie, for Red Cross services
- Violet McConochie Brown, for services in connection with soldiers' equipment
- Charles Hay ward Burgess, Mayor of New Plymouth, for patriotic services
- Alexander Burt, Junior, for services in connection with the Motor Boat Section of the New Zealand Defence Forces
- Edith de Castro, for services in institutions at Cairo and in Canteen at Ismailia, Egypt
- Esther Charles, for patriotic services
- Lydia Clark, for services in connection with the Countess of Liverpool Fund for the New Zealand Expeditionary Force
- Ethel Mary Cooper, for services in connection with the New Zealand Branch of the British Red Cross Society and the Order of St. John
- Frances Zoe Courage, for services in connection with the New Zealand Branch of the British Red Cross Society and the Order of St. John of Jerusalem
- Gertrude Alice Crawford, for services in connection with the Countess of Liverpool Fund for the New Zealand Expeditionary Force
- Ethel Cuff, for services in connection with the New Zealand Branch of the British Red Cross Society and the Order of St. John of Jerusalem
- Hannah Dawson, for patriotic services
- George Finley Dixon, for services as Private Secretary to the Minister of Defence
- Mabel Ellison, for service in connection with the New Zealand Branch of the British Red Cross Society and the Order of St. John of Jerusalem
- Harold Gerard, for services as Assistant Private Secretary to the Minister of Defence
- Louisa Grace Charlotte Greenslade, for patriotic services
- Thomas Gunnion, for patriotic services
- Brenda Guthrie, for services as a voluntary worker at the Victoria Military Ward of the Wellington Hospital
- Eveline Alice Marian Harcourt, for services on the voluntary staff at Base Records Office, New Zealand
- Kate Harrison, for patriotic services
- Henry William Harrington, for services as Censor
- Heathcote George Helmore, for services as Aide-de-Camp to the Governor-General of New Zealand
- Emma Carey Hill, for services in connection with the Victoria League
- Margaret Mary Annie Hislop, for services in connection with the Countess of Liverpool Fund
- Ann Margaret Kitchen, for services in connection with Belgian Relief and the entertainment of New Zealand soldiers
- Elizabeth Annie Holdsworth, for services on the voluntary staff at Base Records Office, New Zealand
- William Godfrey Holdsworth, for services on the voluntary staff at Base Records Office, New Zealand
- Lavinia Jano Kelsey, for patriotic services
- Emma Ethel Maud Ford King, for patriotic services
- Sarah Hannah King, for patriotic services
- James Lovell for services in connection with Patriotic Funds
- Ethel Constance Chapman Macassey, for patriotic services
- Mina MacDonald, for services at the Aotea Home, Heliopolis, Cairo, Egypt
- Mysie McDonnell, for services at the Aotea Home, Heliopolis, Cairo, Egypt
- Agnes McDougall, for services in connection with patriotic undertakings
- Pura McGregor, for services in connection with the Maori Expeditionary Force
- Nesta Gertrude Maling, for services in connection with the Countess of Liverpool Fund for the New Zealand Expeditionary Force
- Basil Arthur Marris, for services as Chief Clerk, Base Records Office, New Zealand
- Alfred Andrew Martin, for services in organising supply of motor vehicles at Auckland for returning soldiers
- Lieutenant Frederick Gwilliam Matthews, for services as Private Secretary to the Minister of Defence
- James Dothie Millton, for services in connection with the Citizens' Defence Corps
- Winnifred Moeller, for patriotic services
- Janet Murray, for services in connection with the New Zealand Branch of the British Red Cross Society and the Order of St. John of Jerusalem
- Leo Francis O'Neill, for services in the Chief of the General Staff's Branch of the Defence Department
- Jessie Ellen Page, for services in supplying comforts to the soldiers at Featherston Military Training Camp
- Lucy Philson, for patriotic services
- Mary Ann Potter, for services in connection with the Red Cross and the Countess of Liverpool Fund
- George Charles Rodda, for services as Officer in charge of War expenses Branch of the Defence Department
- William Archibald Russell, for services in connection with patriotic undertakings
- George Herbert Scales, for services in shipping matters, and other patriotic work
- Annie Wilhelmina Smart, for services in connection with patriotic undertakings
- Lilly Mary Smith, for services in connection with the New Zealand Branch of the British Red Cross Society and the Order of St. John of Jerusalem
- Martha Spencer, for services in connection with the Maori Expeditionary Force
- Florence Johanna Stevenson, for work for the New Zealand Branch of the British Red Cross Society and the Order of St. John of Jerusalem
- Bernard Tripp, for work for the New Zealand Branch of the British Red Cross Society and the- Order of St. John of Jerusalem
- Charles James Tunks, for services to the St. John Ambulance Association
- James Alfred Wallace, for Red Cross and other patriotic services
- Elsmie Ward, for services on the voluntary staff at Base Records Office, New Zealand
- Charles White, for services in connection with patriotic funds
- Cecil James Wray, for services in connection with Prisoners of War and the comfort of New Zealand troops in hospitals in the United Kingdom
- Elten Wray, for services in connection with New Zealand prisoners of war
- Mrs. F. R. Young, for services in connection with the New Zealand War Contingent Association, London

Union of South Africa

- Julia Ada Anderson, Secretary to Queen Mary's Needlework Guild, Pretoria
- Agnes McWhirter Appelyard, Member of the Johannesburg Local Committee of the Governor-General's Fund
- Julia Constance Addie, for general war services at Witbank
- Charles William Black, Senior, for services in connection with war recruiting and the welfare of returned soldiers at Mossel Bay
- Mary Ann Champion, for general war services, Boksburg
- Norris Tynwald Cowin, for services in connection with recruiting
- Jean Conchie, for general war work and supply of comforts for returned soldiers, Braamfontein
- Alfred Edward Catchpole, for services in connection with the South African Red Cross in London
- Robert Edward Downing, for services in connection with the Governor-General's Fund in East London
- Caroline Elizabeth Grattan Edgar, for general war services, Stellenbosch
- Sydney York Bales, Secretary to the Commissioner of Enemy subjects and Custodian of enemy property
- Amy Anderson Fisher, Honorary Treasurer, Non-Contingent Committee of the South African Hospital and Comforts Fund, &c
- Robert Wilson Fair, Officer in Charge of exports
- Mathilde Field, for general war services at Oudtshoorn
- Dorothy Eleanor Garlake, for Red Cross services at Cradock
- Lilian Napier Giddy, for general war services at Grahamstown
- Catherine Ramsay Laburn Grieve, for general war services at Braamfontein
- Lena Herman, Mayoress of Pietersburg, for general war sendees
- Helen Edith Howard, for general war services at Barberton
- Lancelot Hugh Dowman Hale, Honorary Secretary, Governor-General's Fund and Returned Soldiers' Labour Bureau, Middelburg, Transvaal
- Christine Louise Herbert-Smith, of the South African Comforts Committee in London
- Edward Wykeham Lydall, for work in supervising accounts for internment camps and relief of distress expenditure
- John George Laing, for general war services at Elliott
- Donald Arderne McIntyre, Honorary Secretary of the Royal Automobile Club of South Africa
- 2nd Lt. Leonard Bertram Naggs, Officer in charge of Comforts Committee, Overseas depot of South African Hospital and Comforts Fund
- George Frederick MacDonogh, South African Railways Agent, Lourengo Marques
- Thomas Maskew Miller, for general war services
- Harrison Ralph Nethersole, Director, Chamber of Mines Central Buying Department
- William Nivison, Honorary Treasurer, Governor-General's Fund
- Capt. Charles Paul Leonard Nel, for services in connection with recruiting; Secretary, Returning Soldiers' Committee, Oudtshoorn
- Constance Perrott Prince, Honorary Assistant Secretary, Red Cross, Durban
- Hannah Mary Poritt, for general war services at Grey Town
- Samuel Redhill, Honorary Secretary, Governor-General's Fund, Springs
- Dorothy Heyward Rogers, Honorary Secretary, Non-Contingent Committee of the South African Hospital and Comforts Funds
- Fergus Carstairs Rogers, for services in connection with recruiting
- Maj. Alfred Ernest Trigger, Assistant Provost Marshal
- Lilian Elizabeth Tatham, for general war work at Grey Town
- Minnie Elena Scott Taylor, Quartermaster at the Voluntary Aid Detachment Hospice, Congella
- George Batchin Thompson, for general war services, Pondoland
- The Rev. Harry Ernest Thompson, Secretary of the Governor-General's Fund Committee, Bloemfontein
- Gilbert Watson, Member of the Central Wool Committee, Port Elizabeth
- Margaret Janet Wallace, Matron of the Voluntary Aid Detachment Hospice, Congella
- Erne Way, for general war services at Grahamstown

Newfoundland

- Charles Pascoe Ayre, for services in connection with the Women's Patriotic Association
- Alfred Charles Blackburn, for patriotic work
- Agnes Clift, for services in connection with the Women's Patriotic Association
- Mildred Clift, for services in connection with the Women's Patriotic Association
- Lillian Maud Facey, for services on behalf of the Women's Patriotic Association
- Janet Aitken Fisher, for services on behalf of the Women's Patriotic Association
- Henry Frederick Fitzgerald, for services in connection with recruiting
- Ethel Harvey, for Red Cross services
- Emily Hannah Hollands, for services in connection with the Women's Patriotic Association
- Henrietta Palfrey Holloway, for services in collecting and preparing Spagnum Moss
- Reuben Horwood, for patriotic services
- Helen Kennedy, for services in connection with the Women's Patriotic Association
- Elizabeth Shaw Lauder, for services on behalf of the Women's Patriotic Association
- Flora Emma McDonald, for services on behalf of the Women's Patriotic Association
- Richard McDonnell, Magistrate of Bay St. George, for services in connection with Pensions and other matters
- Margaret McPherson, President of the Daughters of the Empire and one of the Reception Committee for Soldiers
- George Frederick Moore, Treasurer of the Patriotic Fund at Heart's Content
- Eliza Petten, for services in connection with the Women's Patriotic Association
- John Alexander Robinson Postmaster-General; for patriotic services
- Organiser of the Tobacco Fund for the Newfoundland Regiment
- Carolina Augusta Somerton, President of the Committee of the Women's Patriotic Association at Trinity
- Charles Robert Steer, for services in raising funds for aeroplanes
- Ernest Swaffield, for patriotic work, Labrador
- Sarah Ann Thompson, for services on behalf of the Women's Patriotic Association
- Effie Morris Tulk, for services on behalf of the Women's Patriotic Association

Crown Colonies, Protectorates, Etc.

- Ina Cameron Ainsworth, for services on behalf of the East Africa Expeditionary Force
- Dorothea Anne Harvey Aldworth of Kuala Lumpur, for services on behalf of British and Allied War Charities in the Federated Malay States
- Hubert Arrnbruster, District Resident, First Grade, Nyasaland Protectorate, for services in connection with the recruitment of carriers and the supply of native foodstuffs
- Edgar Arrigo, Deputy Assistant Secretary, Lieutenant Governor's Office, Malta
- Captain Francis John Bagshawe, Assistant Political Officer, Mbulu, German East Africa
- Blanche Bancroft, for war work in Barbados
- William Bartley, for services as Secretary to the Food Control, Shipping and other Committees, Straits Settlements
- Charles Frederick Belcher, Magistrate, Uganda Protectorate, for sendees as Custodian of enemy property
- Agnes Bennett, of Umtali, Rhodesia, for services in connection with war funds
- Albert Victor Bernard for services in connection with hospital and nursing work in Malta
- Maud Bettington, for services in connection with hospital work, Gold Coast
- Robert William Bryant, Mayor of Kingston, Jamaica, for general war work
- Augusta Margaret Bucknor, for services in aid of the Gold Coast Red Coast Fund
- James Arthur Edward Bullock, Chief Clerk, Colonial Secretary's Department, Hong Kong
- John James Bushell, services in connection with the Red Cross, Bermuda
- Lewis Borg Cardona, for services as Secretary to the Supplies and Prices Board and the Wheat Board, Malta
- Henry Casolani, for services in connection with the importation of foodstuffs into Malta
- Louise Chataway, of Umtali, Rhodesia, for services in connection with war funds
- Albert Henry Cipriani, Member of the Liquidating Committee for winding-up alien enemy businesses in Trinidad
- Percival Herbert Clarke, Unofficial Member of the Legislative Council, East Africa Protectorate, for services on behalf of the British Red Cross Society and Order of St. John
- Marie Penelope Rose Clementi, for services in connection with Queen Mary's Needlework Guild in British Guiana
- Ada Blanche Pierce Conyers, for services in connection with Queen Mary's Needlework Guild in British Guiana
- Percy Charles Cookson, Magistrate, Northern Rhodesia, for services in connection with native carriers
- Edward Arden Copeman, Magistrate, Northern Rhodesia, for services in connection with native carriers
- Manuel Gregory Corsi, for services as Member of the Food Supply Committee, Gibraltar
- Alexander Percy Cowley, Chairman of the Agricultural and Commercial Society of Antigua, for services in connection with war charities
- Attilio Critien for medical services during the war, Malta
- Edmund Clarke de Fonseka, for services in support of war charities in Ceylon
- Dora Florence De Freitas, for Red Cross and other war work, Windward Islands
- Mary Margaret de Soyse, for services in connection with, war charities in Ceylon
- Florence Grace Drew, for services in connection with Red Cross funds, Northern Rhodesia
- Maude Ellefred Evans for general war work, Gibraltar
- Beaumont Albany Fetherstone-Dilke Assistant Surgeon, Colonial Hospital, Gibraltar
- Alfred E. Ffrench, for services in connection with Red Cross work and recruiting, Jamaica
- Violet Amy Flint, for services on behalf of the East Africa Expeditionary Force
- Elfrida Fuller, for hospital work in Ashanti
- Joseph Gatt-Rutter, Chief Clerk, Secretariat, German East Africa
- Gladys Gordon, for Red Cross and other charitable work in Ceylon
- Charles William Gregory, Chief Storekeeper, Public Works Department, East Africa Protectorate, acted as Food Controller at Mombasa
- Lieutenant Alexander Greig, Assistant Political Officer, German East Africa
- Joseph Ephraim Casely Hayford, Barrister-at-Law, for services in aid of the Prince of Wales's Patriotic Fund, Gold Coast
- Josephine Norie Henocksburg, for work in connection with the Women's War Work League, East Africa Protectorate
- James Henry Hewett, Chief Prisons Officer, Zanzibar Protectorate, for services in connection with local defence and the custody of prisoners of war
- Frances Patton Heyman, of Bulawayo, Rhodesia, for services in connection with war funds
- Alice Hickling, for services as Secretary, Queen Mary's Needlework Guild, Hong Kong
- Ernest Augustis Hinkson, for war work in Barbados in connection with the Police Force
- Alice Mary Hobley, for work on behalf of the East Africa Expeditionary Force
- Dorothy Hobson, for services in connection with the Red Cross and other war funds, Trinidad
- Anthony Hodgson, for services to the Cable Censor's Department, Gibraltar
- Anne Huyshe Eliot, for services in connection with war charities in Ceylon
- Sybil Ingham, of Gwelo, Rhodesia, for services in connection with war funds
- Hubert Lawrence Johnson, for services as Chief Passport Examiner, Barbados
- Herbert Lewis Lezard, ex-Mayor of Salisbury, Rhodesia, for services in connection with war funds
- Hilda Charlotte Long, for services in con.nection with war funds, Basutoland
- George Lyall, First Assistant Secretary, Uganda Protectorate
- Sydney Cameron McCutchin, for services in connection with recruiting, Jamaica
- James Colin Macintyre, Member of the Executive and Legislative Councils, Dominica, for services in connection with recruiting and war charities
- Mary McKeartan, of Bulawayo, Rhodesia, for services in connection with war funds
- Annie Mackie, for Red Cross and other charitable work, Windward Islands
- Henry Peter Marius McLaughlan, Chief Clerk, Chief Secretary's Office, Cyprus, for services in connection with the purchase of supplies
- Albert Merriefield, Assistant Engineer, Public Works Department, Cyprus, for services in connection with the Prisoners of War Camp, Famagusta
- Horace Myers, of Kingston, Jamaica, for services to contingents from the Bahama Islands
- Ruth Ethel Paul, for services in connection with war funds, Bechuanaland Protectorate
- Mary Percival for services in connection with war charities in Antigua
- Mary Perez, for services in connection with war funds and charities, Trinidad
- Percy Wilbraham Perryman, District Commissioner, Uganda Protectorate, for services in connection with the organisation of transport and food supplies
- Emily Phillips, for war work in Barbados
- Captain Charles Peniston Pitt, Bermuda Volunteer Rifle Corps, Assistant Provost Marshal, Bermuda
- Captain George Arthur Evered Poole, for services as District Political Officer at Yendi, Upper Togoland
- Anna Pordage, for services as Nurse-Matron of the Victoria Hospital, St. Lucia
- John Rutherfoord Parkin Postlethwaite, Assistant District Commissioner, Uganda Protectorate, for assistance in recruiting
- Thomas Frederick Sandford, Native Commissioner, Northern Rhodesia, for services in connection with native carriers
- Emilïe Scanlen, of Salisbury, Rhodesia, for services in connection with war funds
- Blanche Shearman-Turner, for services in connection with the Convalescent Home for Officers, Zanzibar
- Montague Earle Sherwood, for services as Private Secretary and Aide-de-Camp to the Governor and Commander-in-Chief of the Straits Settlements
- Ether Stabb, for services as president, Queen Mary's Needlework Guild, Hong Kong
- Robert Sutherland, for services in connection with Shipping control, Hong Kong
- Elizabeth Sweenie, for services on behalf of the East Africa Expeditionary Force
- Dieudonnée Grace Thorburn, for services on behalf of the Nyasaland Field Force
- Helen Tredgold, of Salisbury, Rhodesia, for work on behalf of Rhodesian soldiers at Cape Town
- Nora Cecilia Tywnam, for work for Queen Mary's Needlework Guild in Ceylon
- Abdulrasul Allidina Visram, for services on behalf of the British Red Cross Society and the Order of St. John of Jerusalem, East Africa Protectorate
- Claude Dudley Wallis, First Assistant Secretary, Zanzibar Protectorate
- Howard Grove Warr, Secretary to the Colonial Hospital, Gibraltar
- Gwendoline Isabel Watson, for services on behalf of the East Africa Expeditionary Force
- Margaret Jane Watson, of Umtali, Rhodesia, for services in connection with war funds
- Josephine Westmorland, for services in connection with Red Cross work and recruiting, Jamaica
- Mabel White, of Gwelo, Rhodesia, for services in connection with war funds
- Francis Williamson, Secretary, Tati Company, for services in connection with war funds, Bechuanaland Protectorate
- Edward Jocelyn Wortley, Director of Agriculture, Bermuda, for services in connection with food supplies
- George Macdonald Young, for services in connection with Shipping Control, Hong Kong

Honorary Members

- Sheikh Burhan bin Abdul Aziz, Kathi, Zanzibar
- Seyyid Serhan bin Nasur, Liwali, Zanzibar

== See also ==
- 1919 Birthday Honours - Full list of awards.
