= Aphra Wilson =

English plant pathologist and director of Boots (1895 – 1976)

Aphra Phyllis Wilson
- Born: January 18, 1895; Cricklewood
- Died: January 6, 1976 (aged 80)

Aphra Wilson (1895 – 1976) was an English plant pathologist whose varied career included being a World War I motorcycle despatch rider, a translator, and one of the first women directors of Boots.

== Education ==
Aphra Phyllis Wilson was born in 1895/6 and attended Queen Anne's School, Caversham, before studying at the Royal College of Science in London, where she graduated in 1921 after an interruption for wartime service.

== War service ==
During World War I she served with the Women's Volunteer Reserve and with Queen Mary's Army Auxiliary Corps, where she worked as a despatch rider delivering messages by motorcycle, and was appointed MBE in 1919 for her role as an Assistant Administrator with the WAAC.

== Translation ==
In 1916 she published a translation of René Boylesve’s A Gentlewoman of France.

== Plant pathology ==
Specialising in plant diseases and pests, she was a plant pathologist at Swanley Horticultural College from 1922 – 30, and worked on colloidal fungicides at Imperial College London.

=== Boots ===
In 1936, Wilson joined the Boots Company, which was moving into horticultural research. Wilson helped to establish the Company’s Lenton Research Station to develop treatments for plant pests and diseases, and was involved in the development of Boots Farms and Gardens Department. During her 21-year career at Boots she held the positions of Director and of Deputy Head of Agricultural Research.

== Later life ==
After her retirement in 1957, she retained her seat on the Board of Boots Eastern Company and was a governor at The Bluecoat School, Nottingham.
