= Beatrice Ethel Lithiby =

British artist

- Lithiby c.1918
- Born: 4 December 1889; Richmond, Surrey
- Died: 25 July 1966 (aged 76); Wantage, Berkshire
- Education: Royal Academy Schools
- Known for: Painting, stained glass, church furnishings
- Awards: MBE, OBE

Beatrice Ethel Lithiby OBE (4 December 1889 – 25 July 1966) was a British artist known as a painter and designer of stained glass and church furnishings. She served in both World War I and World War II in the British Army and in the former conflict also worked as a war artist for the Imperial War Museum.

== Biography ==
=== Early life ===
Lithiby was born at Richmond, then in Surrey and now in London, the daughter of John Lithiby (1853-1936), a barrister, and Ethel Stewart née Smith (1860-1943). Lithiby studied at the Royal Academy Schools. As a student she was due to become engaged to a fellow student, Frank Skinner, when he returned from military service but he was killed in July 1916 on the Somme and Lithiby would mark the anniversary of his death each year with a notice in The Daily Telegraph.

=== First World War ===
During the First World War, Lithiby joined the Women's Army Auxiliary Corps (WAAC) on 4 August 1917 as an assistant administrator (a rank equivalent to second lieutenant). She then served with the Queen Mary's Army Auxiliary Corps (QMAAC) in France for eighteen months. She was promoted from deputy administrator (equivalent to lieutenant) to unit administrator (equivalent to captain) on 21 January 1918. In the 1919 King's Birthday Honours, she was appointed a Member of the Order of the British Empire (Military Division) (MBE) "for services rendered in connection with the War". She officially left the QMAAC on 5 December 1919.

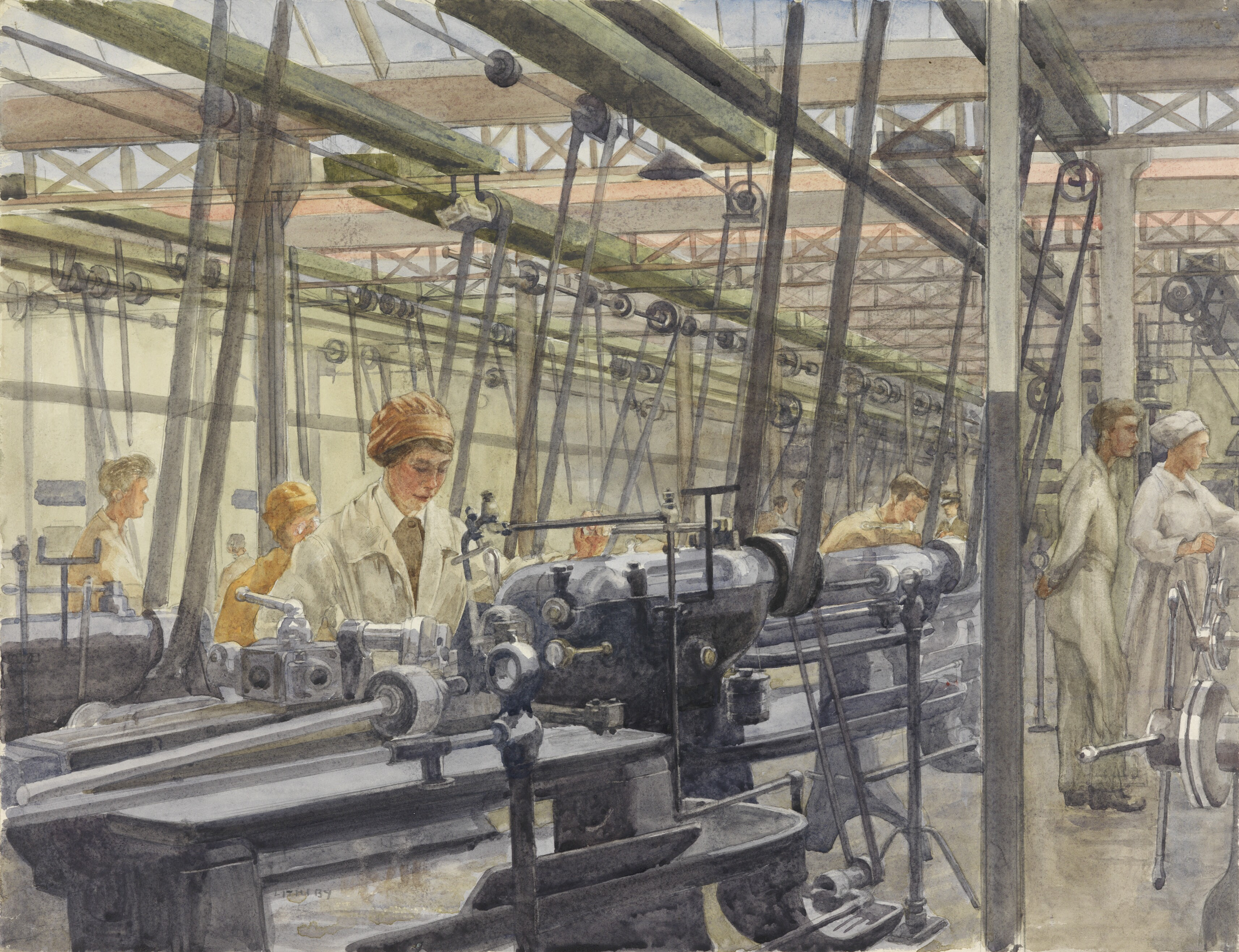
Queen Mary's Army Auxiliary Corps Mechanics in the Engine Repair Shop, Rouen

In February 1919, she approached the Women's Work Committee of the Imperial War Museum with an offer to record the activities of the QMAAC members remaining in France before their units were disbanded and they returned home. The Committee agreed to her proposal and Lithiby spent a further six months in France recording, in sketches and watercolour paintings, the work of the QMAAC at camps in Dieppe, Rouen, Le Havre and Abbeville where the Corps' members were tending cemeteries, clearing former battlefields and performing other industrial and administrative roles. Although Lithiby had initially agreed a greatly reduced fee with the Committee, three months into her commission the Committee wrote to her to say that due to budget cuts they would be unable to pay her at all. Lithiby continued with the work and in due course donated twenty watercolours to the Imperial War Museum which forms a rare artistic record of the work of women in military service at the time.

=== Post-WW1 ===
From 1920 to 1939, Lithiby worked as a figure and landscape painter and muralist. She regularly exhibited at both the Royal Academy and the Royal Society of British Artists and was elected a member of the latter in 1930. She also exhibited with the Society of Women Artists, the Royal Institute of Painters in Water Colours and at Walker's Galleries. She completed commissions for stained-glass windows and church furnishings both in Britain, in Japan and South Africa.

For many years Lithiby lived at Wantage in Berkshire. Her home and studio were in the grounds of an Anglican convent, the Community of St Mary the Virgin, and Lithiby was a devout Christian. She compiled a history book about Wantage parish church.

During the Second World War, Lithiby rejoined the British Army and rose to a senior rank. She joined the Auxiliary Territorial Service as a second subaltern (equivalent in rank to second lieutenant) on 30 May 1941. By December 1943, she was a senior commander (equivalent to major) and held the temporary rank of chief commander (equivalent to lieutenant colonel). In the 1944 New Year Honours, her MBE was promoted to Officer of the Order of the British Empire (OBE).

She died on 25 July 1966, on the 50th anniversary of the death of Frank Skinner. She never married.

== See also ==
- Olive Mudie-Cooke
- Iso Rae
