= Vizcaíno =

Vizcaíno may refer to:

- Biscayne (ethnonym), an ethnonym in use in Spanish between the Renaissance and 19th century, meaning a Basque speaking person

== Places ==
- Key Biscayne, originally Cayo Vizcaíno, an island in Florida, USA
- Sebastián Vizcaíno Bay, a natural feature of Baja California Peninsula, Mexico
- Vizcaíno, Baja California Sur, including Vizcaino Desert and the island of Vizcaino
- El Vizcaíno Biosphere Reserve, including the El Vizcaíno Whale Sanctuary and part of the El Vizcaíno Desert, Baja California Peninsula, Mexico
- Vizcaíno Island, an island in the estuary between the River Uruguay and River Negro in Uruguay
- Vizcaínos, a village with 50 inhabitants in Burgos Provinicia, Spain

== People ==
- Arnoldo Vizcaíno, Mexican PDR politician
- Arodys Vizcaíno (born 1990), Dominican Republic baseball player
- Antonio Camacho Vizcaíno (born 1964), Spanish Minister of the Interior
- Fernando Vizcaíno Casas (1926–2003), Spanish labour lawyer and writer
- Juan Vizcaíno (born 1966), Spanish footballer
- José Vizcaíno (born 1968), Dominican Republic baseball player
- Luis Vizcaíno (born 1974), Dominican Republic baseball player
- Pablo Vizcaíno Prado (born 1951), Guatemalan bishop
- Pedro Vizcaíno (born 1966), Cuban-born American painter
- Nectalí Vizcaíno (born 1977), Colombian footballer
- José Madero Vizcaíno (born 1980), lead singer of the Mexican group Panda
- Roberto Vizcaíno (1957–2016), Spanish tennis player
- Sebastián Vizcaíno (1548–1624), Spanish explorer
- Indira Vizcaíno Silva (born 1987), Mexican PDR congresswoman, daughter of Arnoldo Vizcaíno

== See also ==
- Vizcaino vs. Microsoft, judicial case (USA) on the rights of permatemp workers
- Vizcaíno (ship), vessel during Columbus's fourth voyage
- Biscayne (disambiguation)
- Biscaino (disambiguation)
