= Biscaino =

Biscaino may refer to:

- Italian for Biscayne
- A nonstandard spelling of Vizcaíno

== People ==
- Bartolomeo Biscaino (1632–1657), Italian painter of the Baroque period, son of Giovanni Andrea
- Giovanni Andrea Biscaino (died 1657), Italian painter of the Baroque period, father of Bartolomeo
- Yusuf Biscaino (fl. 1610–11), Morisco in the service of the Moroccan Sultan Mulay Zidan
