= Adoration of the Magi =

Subject in Christian art

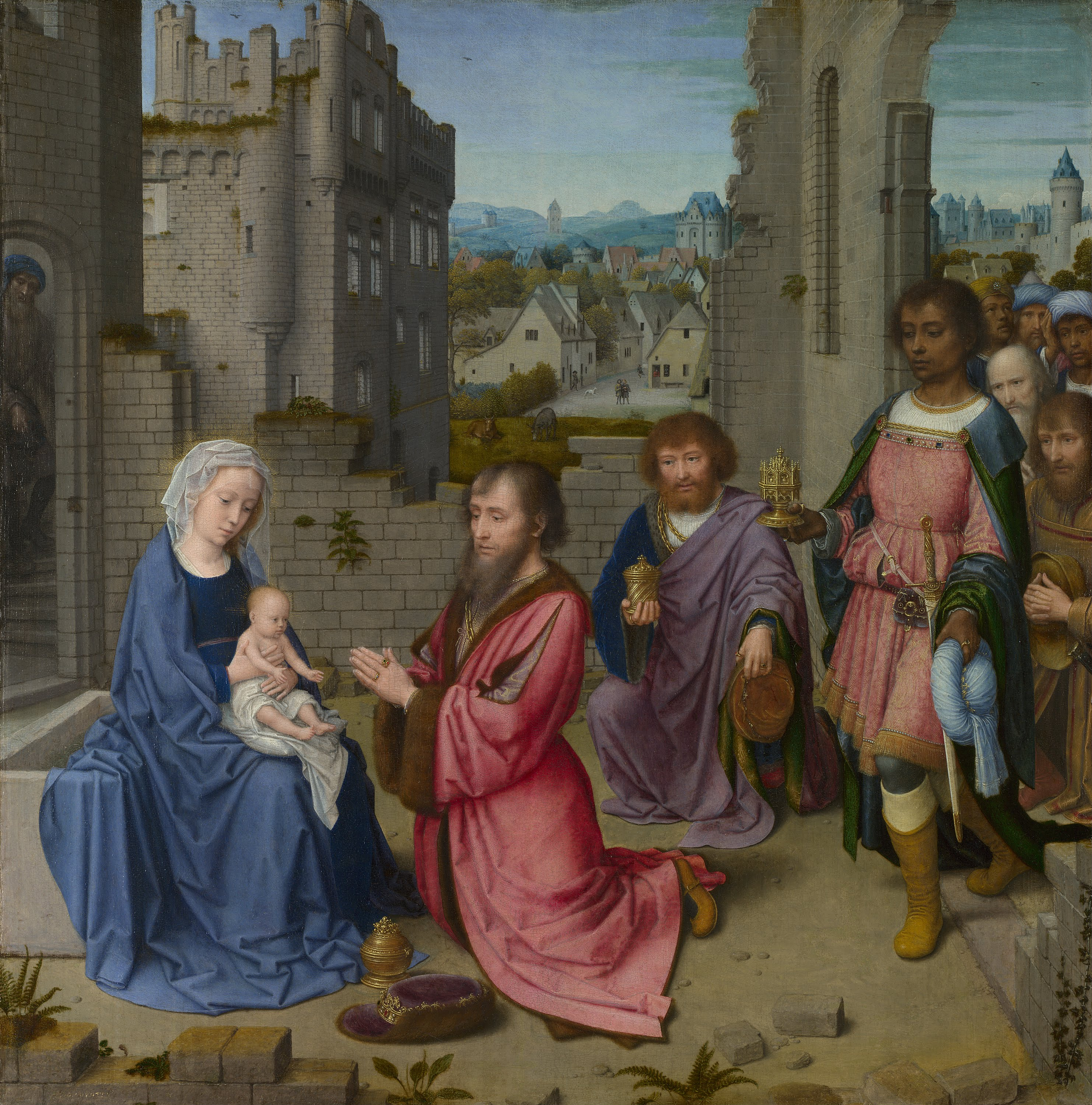
Gerard David, Adoration of the Kings, National Gallery, London, circa 1515

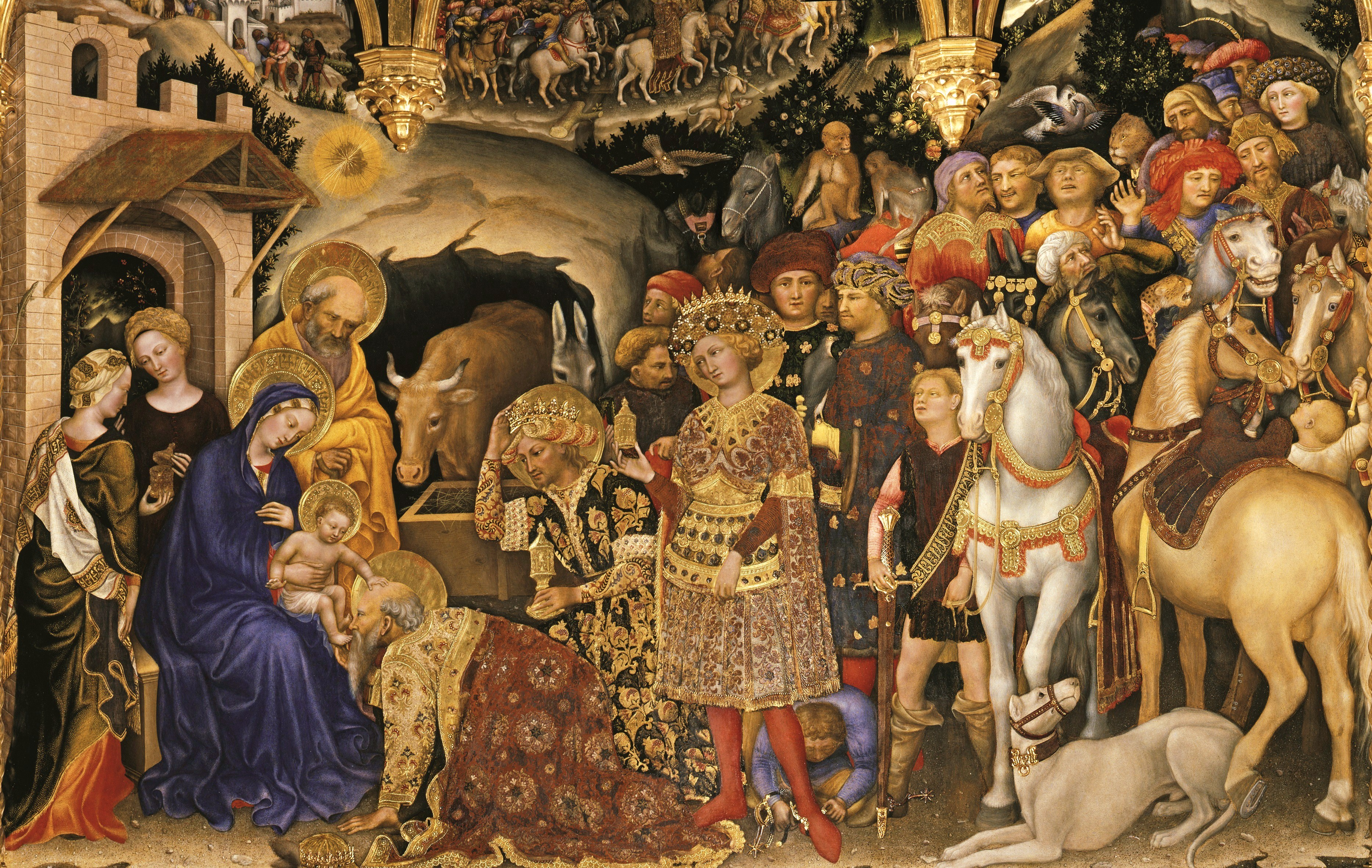
Adoration of the Magi, Gentile da Fabriano, 1423

The Adoration of the Magi — also known as the Adoration of the Kings or the Visitation of the Wise Men — is the name traditionally given to a popular subject in the Nativity of Jesus in art. In these depictions, three Magi (traditionally represented as kings, especially in the West), having found Jesus by following a star, lay before him gifts of gold, frankincense, and myrrh, and worship him. The scene originates from the Biblical account in Matthew 2:11: "On entering the house, they saw the child with Mary his mother; and they knelt down and paid him homage. Then, opening their treasure chests, they offered him gifts of gold, frankincense, and myrrh. And having been warned in a dream not to return to Herod, they left for their own country by another path".

Christian iconography considerably expanded the bare account of the Biblical Magi described in the Gospel of Matthew (2:1–22). By the later Middle Ages this drew from non-canonical sources like the Golden Legend by Jacobus de Voragine. Artists used the expanded Christian iconography to reinforce the idea that Jesus was recognized, from his earliest infancy, as king of the earth. The adoration scene was often used to represent the Nativity, one of the most indispensable episodes in cycles of the Life of the Virgin as well as the Life of Christ.

Stories throughout the Middle Ages started circulating, which speculated who exactly were the three kings who were famous for visiting the Christ child. Many people assumed that they came from somewhere in the east. Eventually it was decided that the three kings would represent the three main continents at the time; Europe, Asia, and Africa. The three names that prevailed over the centuries for the three kings were Gaspar (or Caspar), Melchior, and Balthasar. The prominence of this story, as well as the three kings or magi, is due to the great theological significance that the Biblical story holds, their exotic clothes and looks, as well as their great and expensive gifts.

In the church calendar, the event is commemorated in Western Christianity as the Feast of the Epiphany (January 6). The Eastern Orthodox Church commemorates the Adoration of the Magi on the Feast of the Nativity (December 25). The term is anglicized from the Vulgate Latin section title for this passage: A Magis adoratur.

== History of the depiction ==
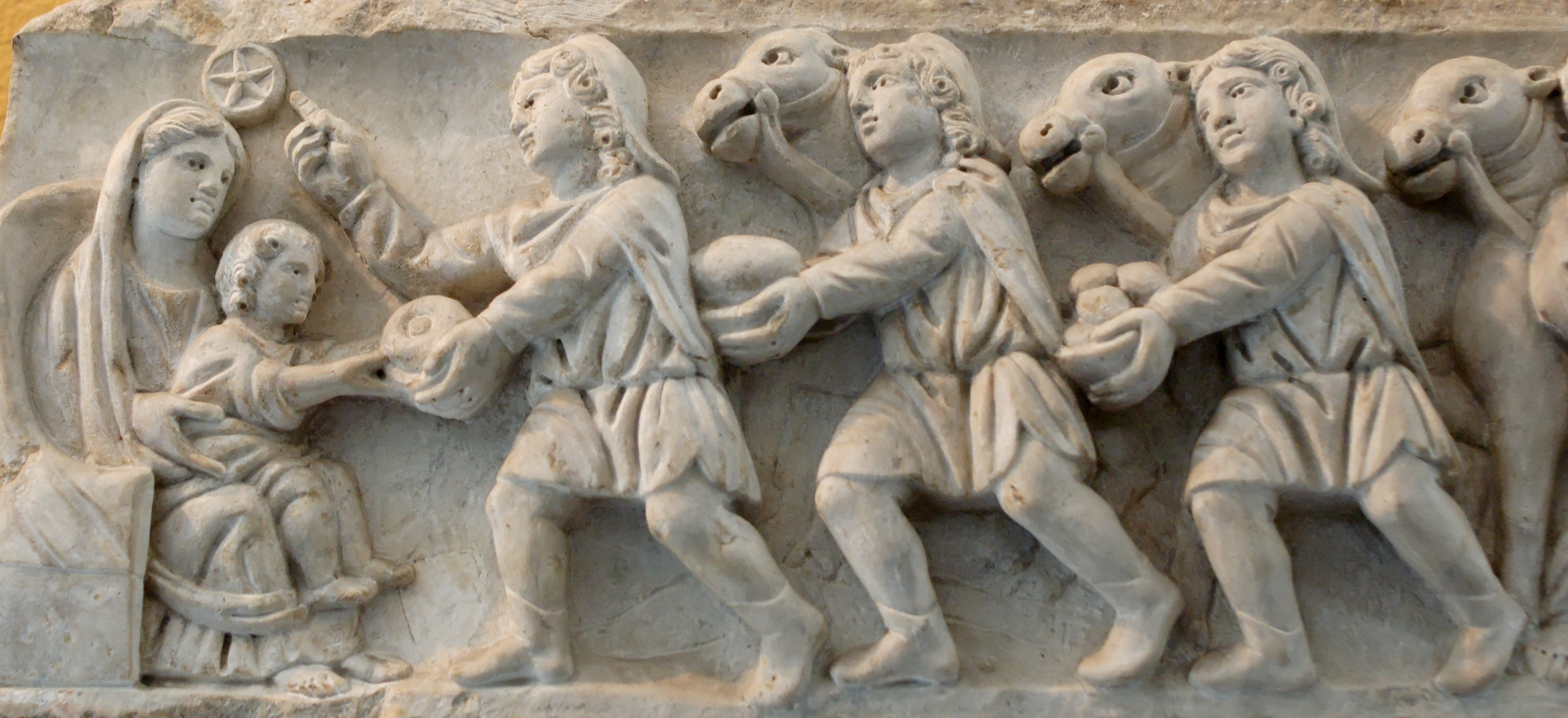
Adoration of the Child Jesus by the three wise men or Magi; sarcophagus relief (4th century), Vatican

Fra Angelico and Filippo Lippi, mid-15th century

In the earliest depictions, the Magi are shown wearing Persian dress of trousers and Phrygian caps, usually in profile, advancing in step with their gifts held out before them. These images adapt Late Antique poses for barbarians submitting to an Emperor, and presenting golden wreaths, and indeed relate to images of tribute-bearers from various Mediterranean and ancient Near Eastern cultures going back many centuries. The earliest are from catacomb paintings and sarcophagus reliefs of the 4th century. Crowns are first seen in the 10th century, mostly in the West, where their dress had by that time lost any Oriental flavour in most cases. The standard Byzantine depiction of the Nativity included the journey or arrival of the mounted Magi in the background, but not them presenting their gifts, until the post-Byzantine period, when the western depiction was often adapted to an icon style. Later Byzantine images often show small pill-box like hats, whose significance is disputed.

The Magi are usually shown as the same age until about this period, but then the idea of depicting the three ages of man is introduced: a particularly beautiful example is seen on the façade of the cathedral of Orvieto. Occasionally from the 12th century, and very often in Northern Europe from the 15th, the Magi are also made to represent the three known parts of the world: Balthasar is very commonly cast as a young African or Moor, and old Caspar is given Oriental features or, more often, dress. Melchior represents Europe and middle age. Early Renaissance paintings of this theme, such as by Fra Angelico and Fra Lippi, emphasize the pomp and pageantry of the scene.

From the 14th century onward, large retinues are often shown, the gifts are contained in spectacular pieces of goldsmith work, and the Magi's clothes are given increasing attention. By the 15th century, the Adoration of the Magi is often a bravura piece in which the artist can display their handling of complex, crowded scenes involving horses and camels, but also their rendering of varied textures: the silk, fur, jewels and gold of the Kings set against the wood of the stable, the straw of Jesus's manger and the rough clothing of Joseph and the shepherds.

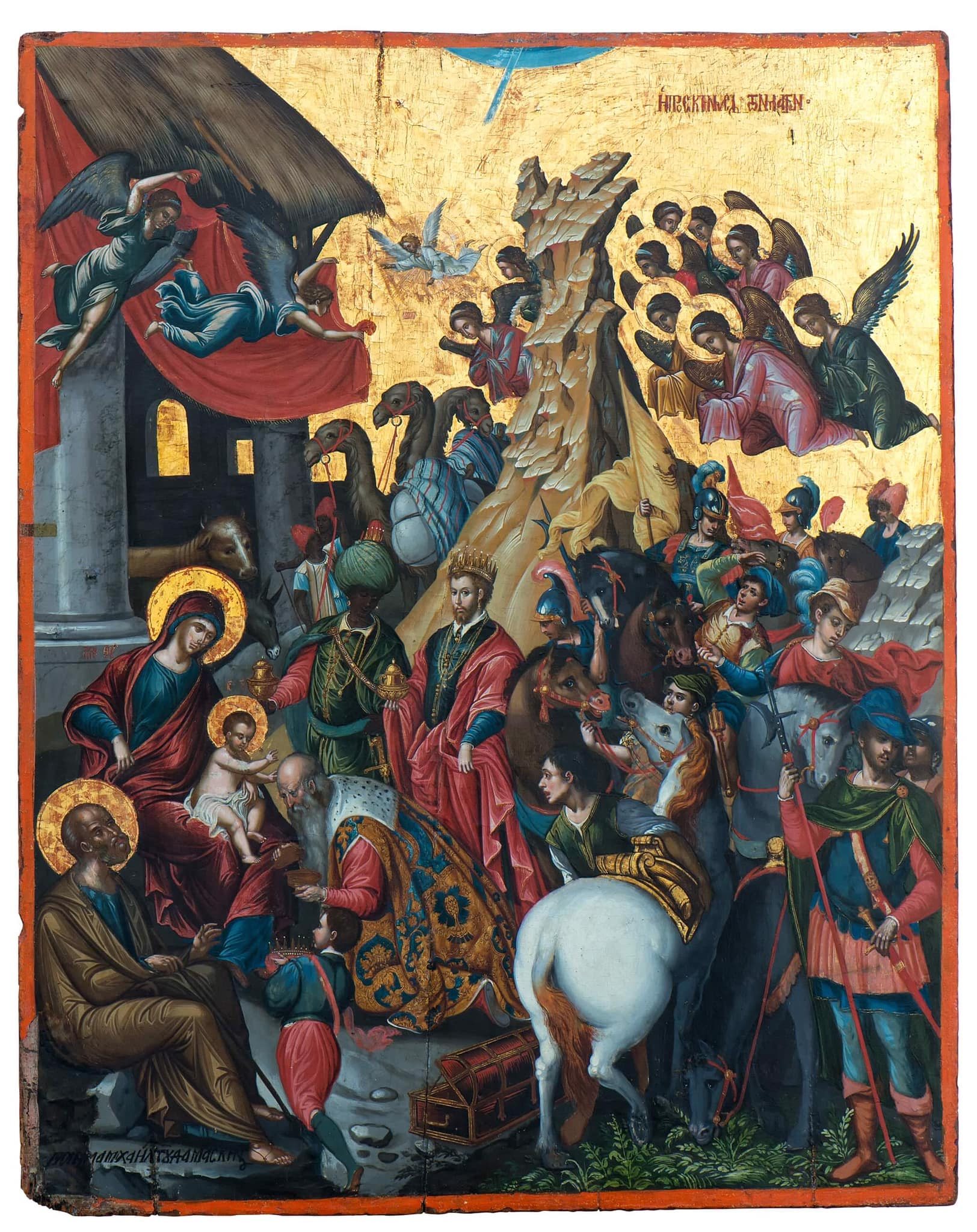
Adoration of the Kings by Michael Damaskinos circa 1591

The subject was especially popular with the artists of Antwerp Mannerism from about 1500 to 1530. These mostly anonymous artists lived in the Golden Age of Antwerp, as it took over from Bruges as the leading business city of the Low Countries, capturing a huge proportion of the explosion in international trade that followed the development by the Portuguese of the sea route from Asia. The Magis were regarded as the patron saints of travelling merchants, and so international trade in general, and large numbers of their patrons no doubt came from the various international business communities from different countries resident in Antwerp. In the Greek world, Cretan painter Michael Damaskinos revitalized the Greek Italian Byzantine style by mixing it with Venetian painting in his rendition of the Adoration of the Magi around 1590. The island of Crete was held by the Venetian Empire, and the painting style was known as the Cretan School.

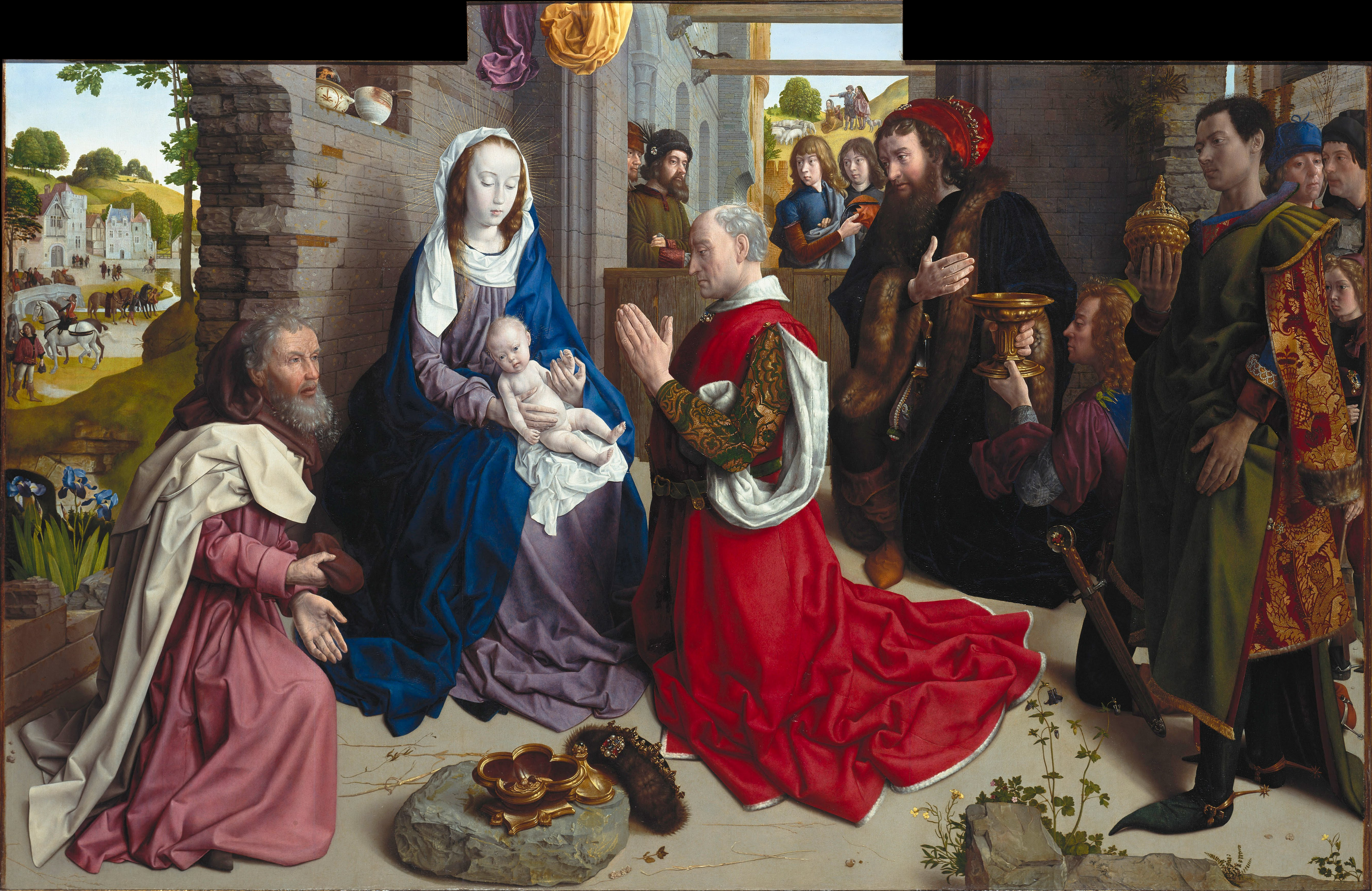
Hugo van der Goes, Monforte Altarpiece, c. 1470

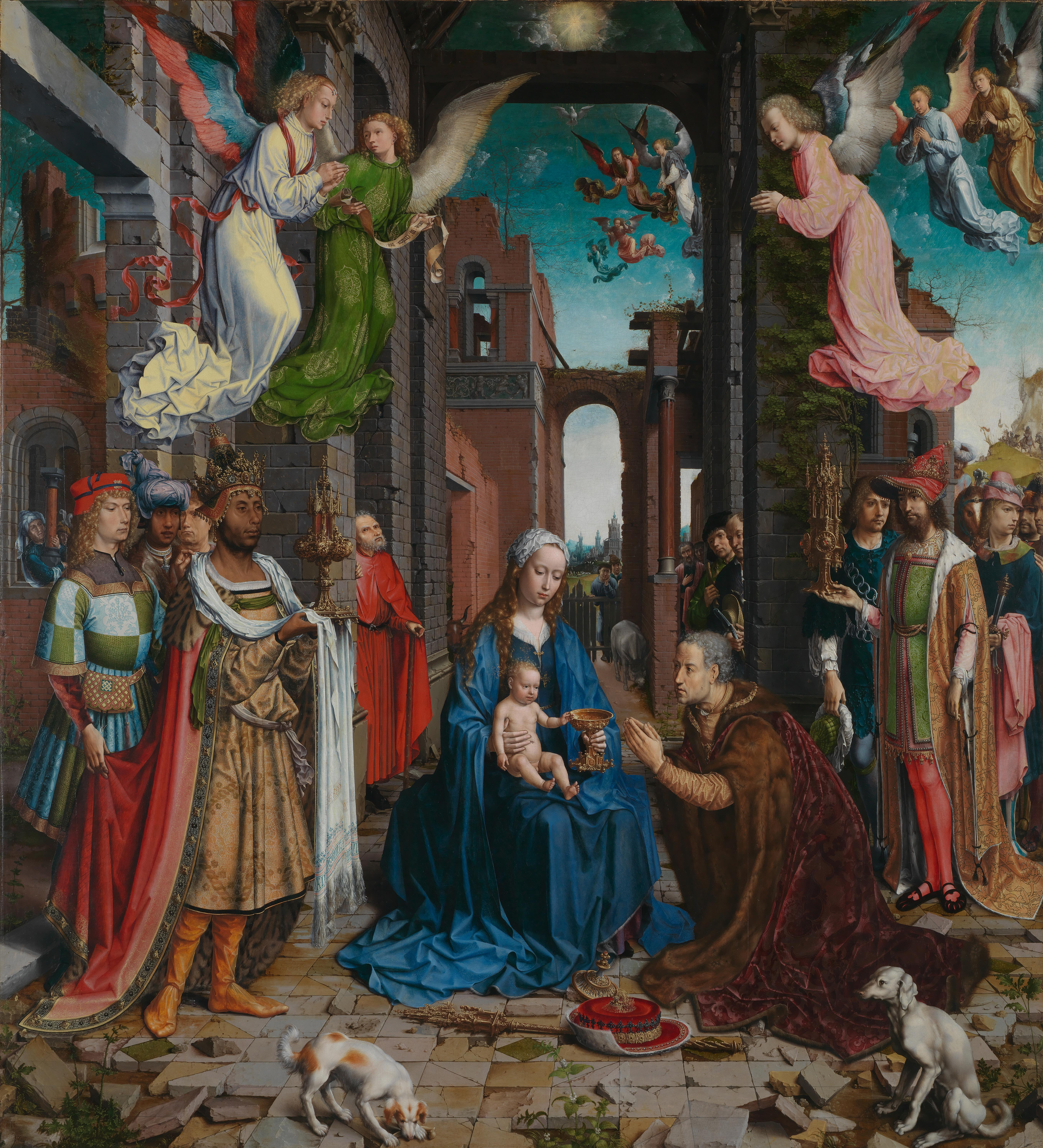
Adoration by Jan Gossaert, 1510–15

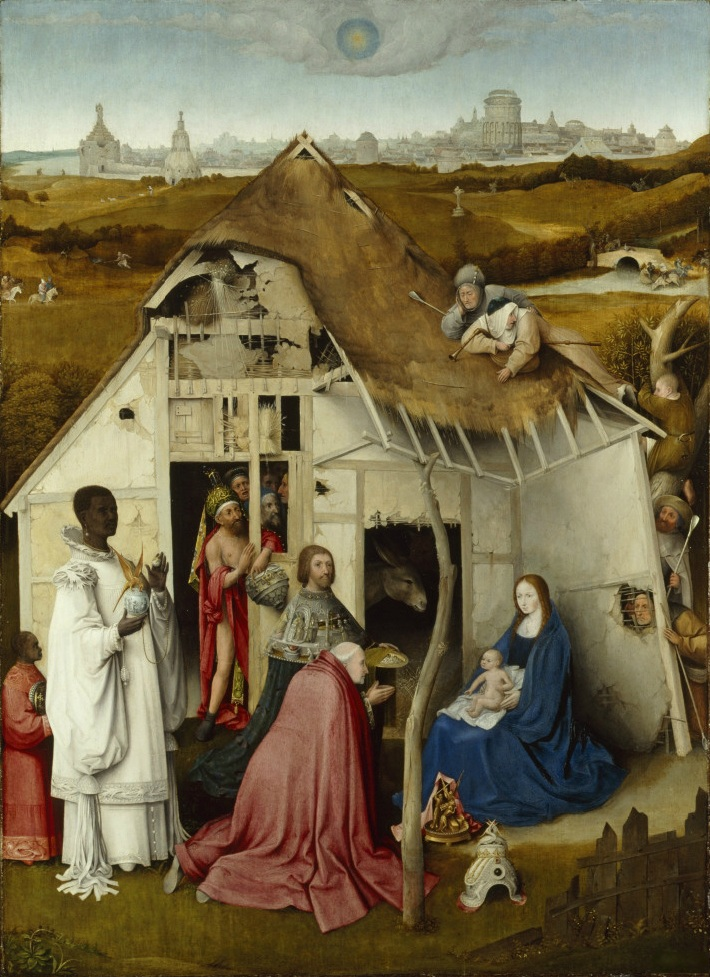
Adoration of the Magi after Hieronymus Bosch

The scene often includes a fair diversity of animals as well: the ox and ass from the Nativity scene are usually there, but also the horses, camels, dogs, and falcons of the kings and their retinue, and sometimes other animals, such as birds in the rafters of the stable. From the 15th century onwards, the Adoration of the Magi is quite often conflated with the Adoration of the Shepherds from the account in the Gospel of Luke (2:8–20), an opportunity to bring in yet more human and animal diversity; in some compositions (triptychs for example), the two scenes are contrasted or set as pendants to the central scene, usually a Nativity.

The "adoration" of the Magi at the crib is the usual subject, but their arrival, called the "Procession of the Magi", is often shown in the distant background of a Nativity scene (usual in Byzantine icons), or as a separate subject, for example in the Magi Chapel frescos by Benozzo Gozzoli in the Palazzo Medici Riccardi, Florence. Other subjects include the Journey of the Magi, where they and perhaps their retinue are the only figures, usually shown following the Star of Bethlehem, and there are relatively uncommon scenes of their meeting with Herod and the Dream of the Magi.

The usefulness of the subject to the Church and the technical challenges involved in representing it have made the Adoration of the Magi a favorite subject of Christian art: chiefly painting, but also sculpture and even music (as in Gian-Carlo Menotti's opera Amahl and the Night Visitors). The subject matter is also found in stained glass. The first figural stained glass window made in the United States is the "Adoration of the Magi" window located at Christ Church, Pelham, New York and designed in 1843 by the founder and first rector's son, William Jay Bolton.

== Treatments by individual artists ==
Many hundreds of artists have treated the subject. A partial list of those with articles follows.

- Adoration of the Magi, Fra Angelico and Filippo Lippi, National Gallery of Art, Washington, D.C.
- Adoration of the Magi, Bartolomeo Biscaino, Musée des Beaux-Arts, Strasbourg
- Adoration of the Magi, Hieronymus Bosch, Museo del Prado, Madrid
- Adoration of the Magi, Botticelli: National Gallery of Art, Washington, D.C.
- Triptych of the Virgin's Life, Dirk Bouts
- The Adoration of the Kings (Bruegel), National Gallery, London
- The Star of Bethlehem, Edward Burne-Jones, Birmingham Museum and Art Gallery
- Adoration of the Magi, Valerio Castello, Musée des Beaux-Arts, Strasbourg
- Adoration of the Magi (Andrea della Robbia), Victoria and Albert Museum
- Saint Columba Altarpiece, Rogier van der Weyden, Alte Pinakothek, Munich
- Adoration of the Kings (Gerard David, London), National Gallery, London
- Adoration of the Kings (Damaskinos), Heraklion, Crete
- Adoration of the Magi (Dürer), Uffizi, Florence
- Adoration of the Magi (Gentile da Fabriano), Uffizi, Florence
- The Adoration of the Magi (Geertgen tot Sint Jans), Rijksmuseum
- Adoration of the Magi, Domenico Ghirlandaio, Ospedale degli Innocenti, Florence
- Adoration of the Kings (van der Goes), Gemäldegalerie, Berlin
- The Adoration of the Kings (Gossaert), National Gallery, London
- Adoration of the Magi (Leonardo da Vinci), Uffizi, Florence
- Adoration of the Magi (Filippino Lippi), Uffizi, Florence
- Adoration of the Magi (Fra Angelico and Filippo Lippi), National Gallery of Art, Washington D.C.
- Adoration of the Magi (Lorenzo Monaco), Uffizi
- Adoration of the Magi (Mantegna), Uffizi
- Madonna and Child (Masaccio), Gemäldegalerie, Berlin
- Adoration of the Magi (Mostaert), Rijksmuseum
- Adoration of the Magi (Perugino, Perugia), Galleria Nazionale dell'Umbria, Perugia
- Adoration of the Magi (Rubens, Lyon), Museum of Fine Arts of Lyon
- Adoration of the Magi (Rubens, Cambridge), King's College Chapel, Cambridge
- Adoration of the Magi (Rubens, Antwerp), Royal Museum of Fine Arts Antwerp
- Adoration of the Magi with Saint Helena, Palma Vecchio, Pinacoteca di Brera, Milan
- Adoration of the Magi (Velázquez), Museo del Prado, Madrid
- Adoration of the Magi (Veronese), National Gallery, London
- Adoration of the Magi (Sequeira), National Museum of Ancient Art, Lisbon
- Adoration of the Magi (tapestry) by Morris and Co with Edward Burne-Jones

== Gallery ==
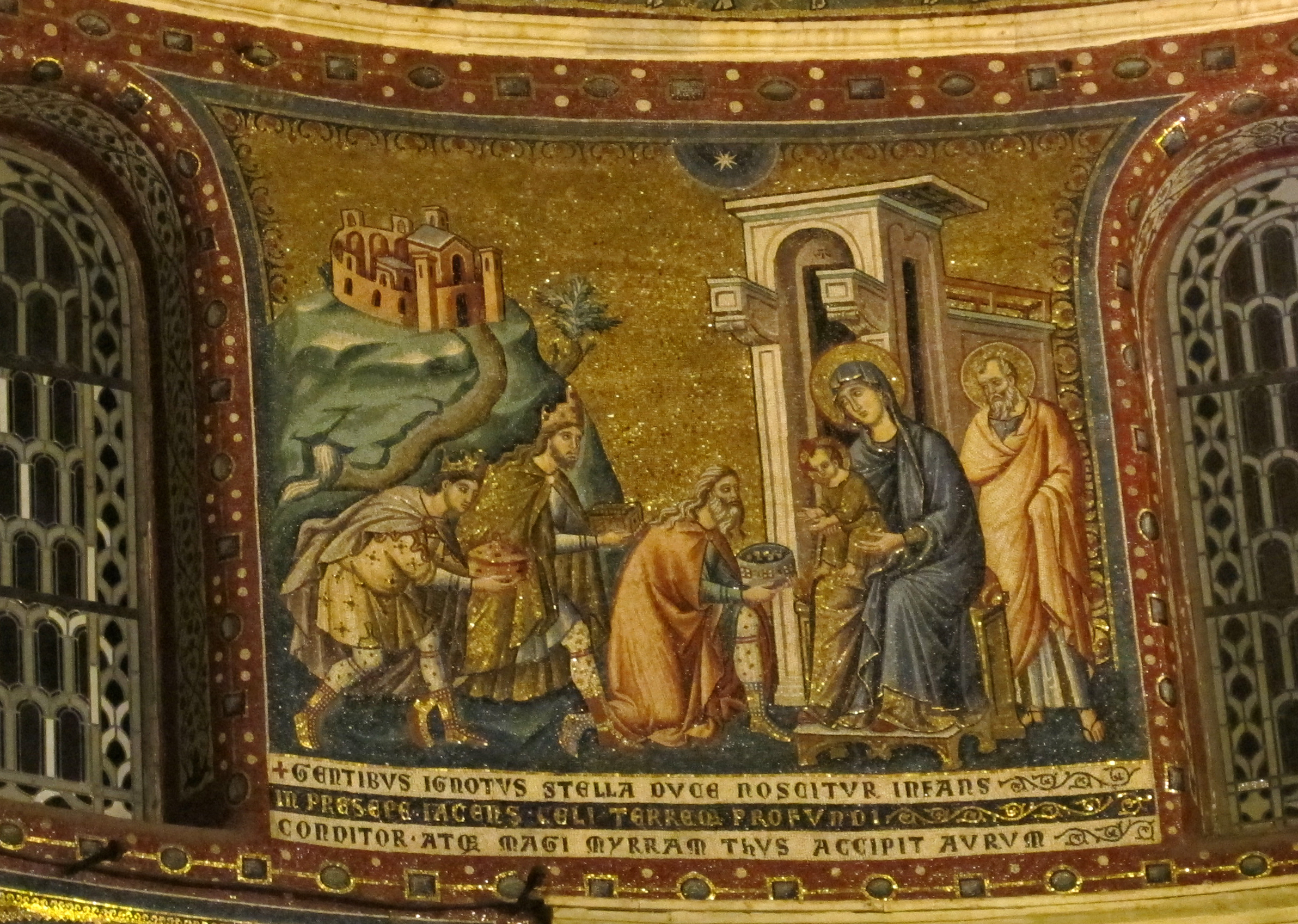
Mosaic, Santa Maria in Trastevere, Rome, by Pietro Cavallini, 13th century

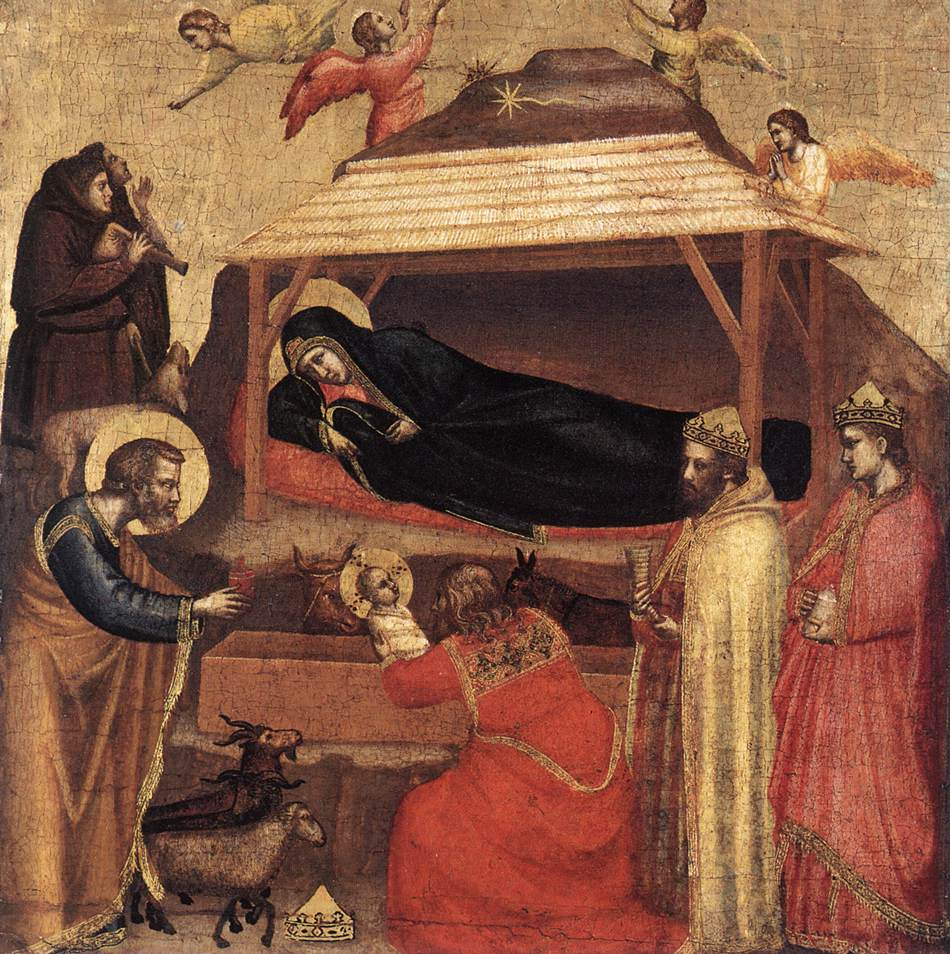
Giotto di Bondone, 1320–1325

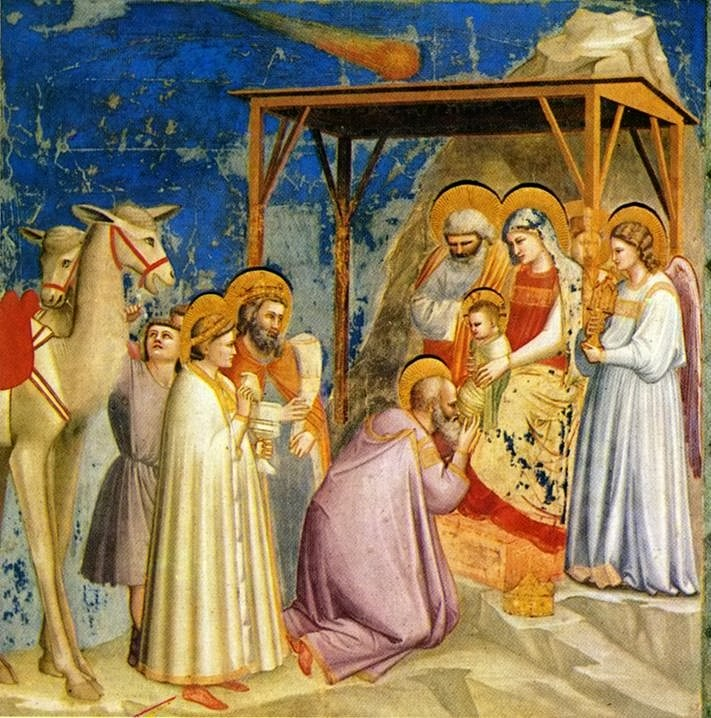
Giotto, Scrovegni Chapel

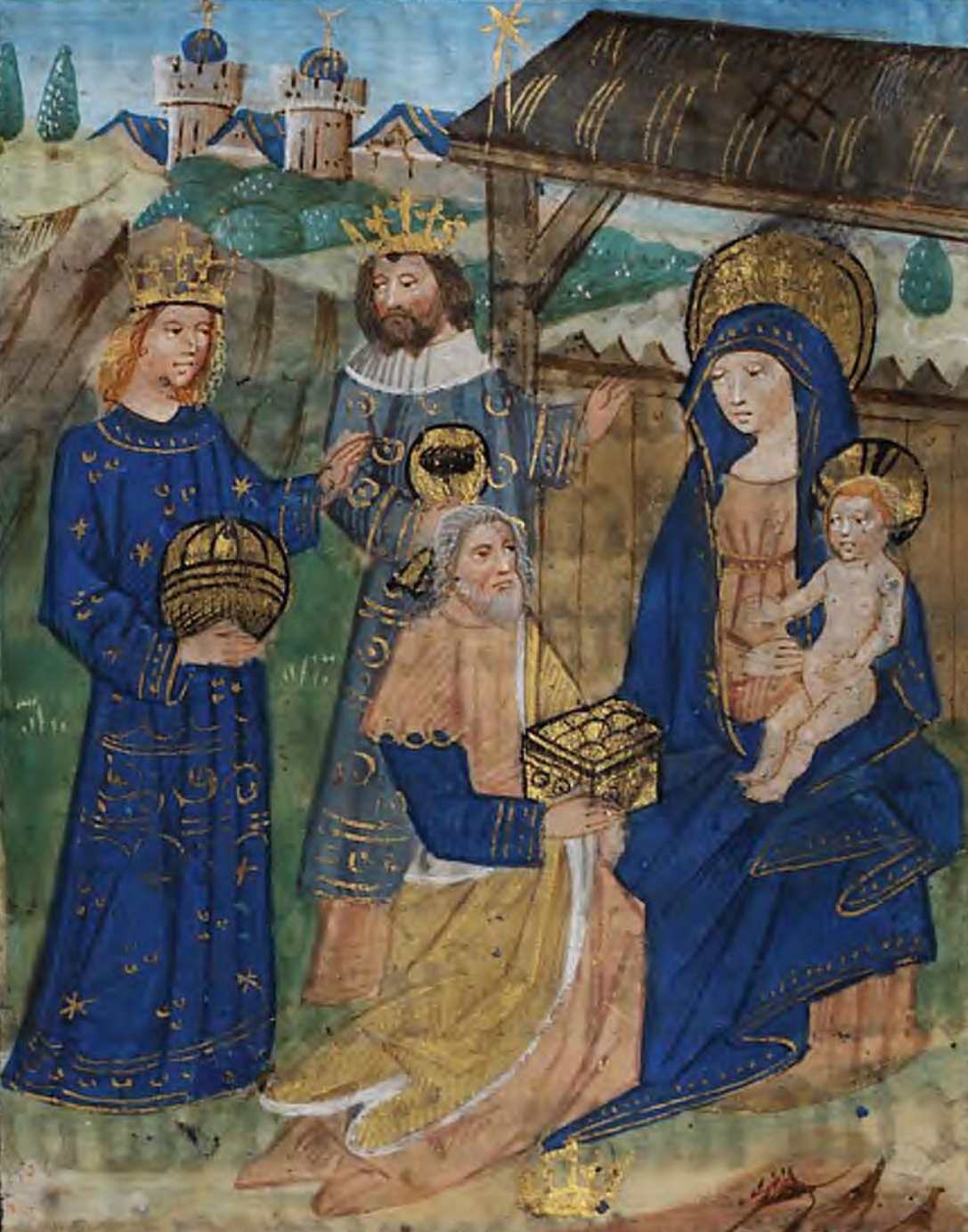
A medieval Book of Hours written for the Grey family of Ruthin, c. 1390

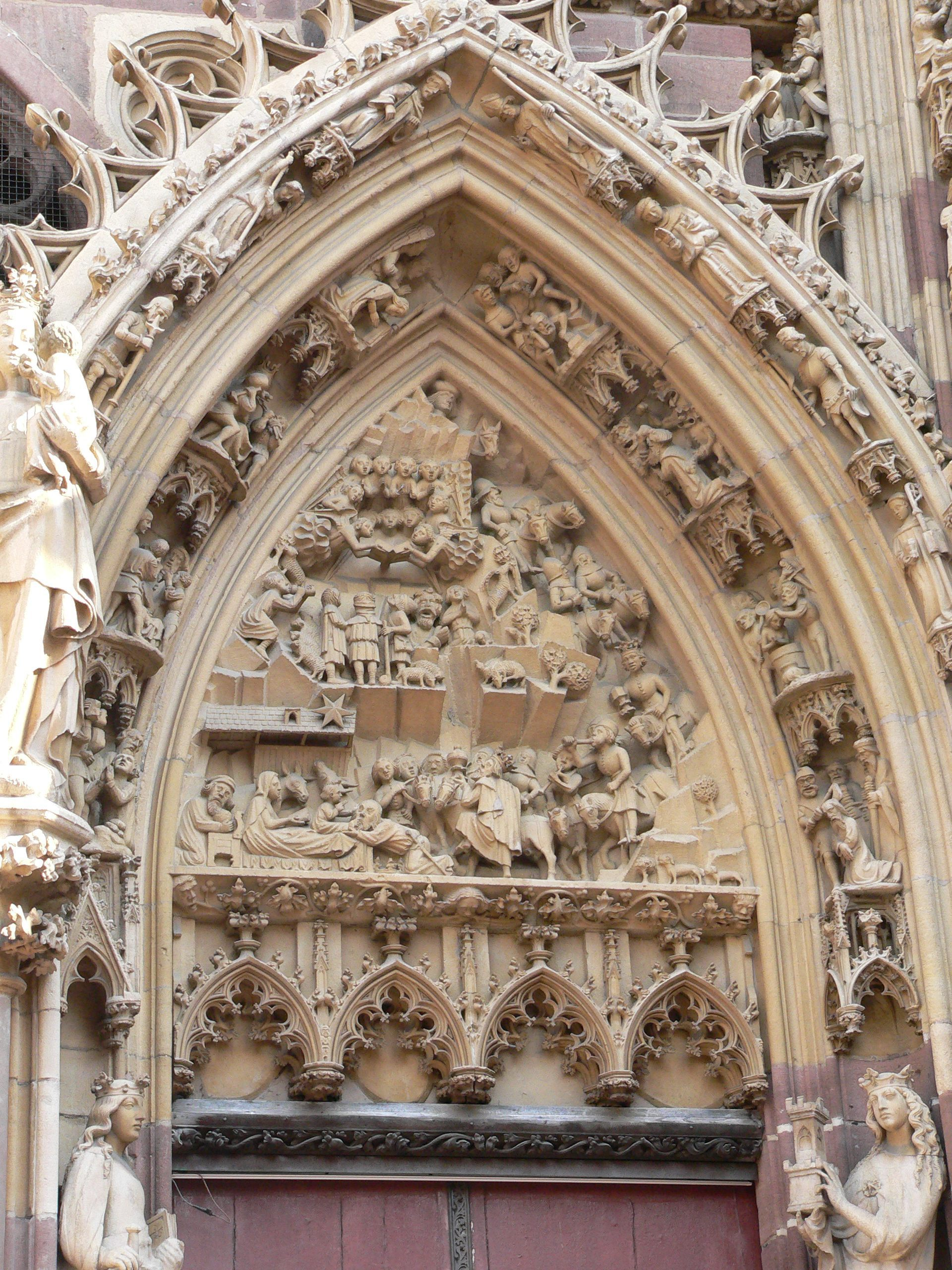
Saint-Thiébaut Church, Thann, around 1400

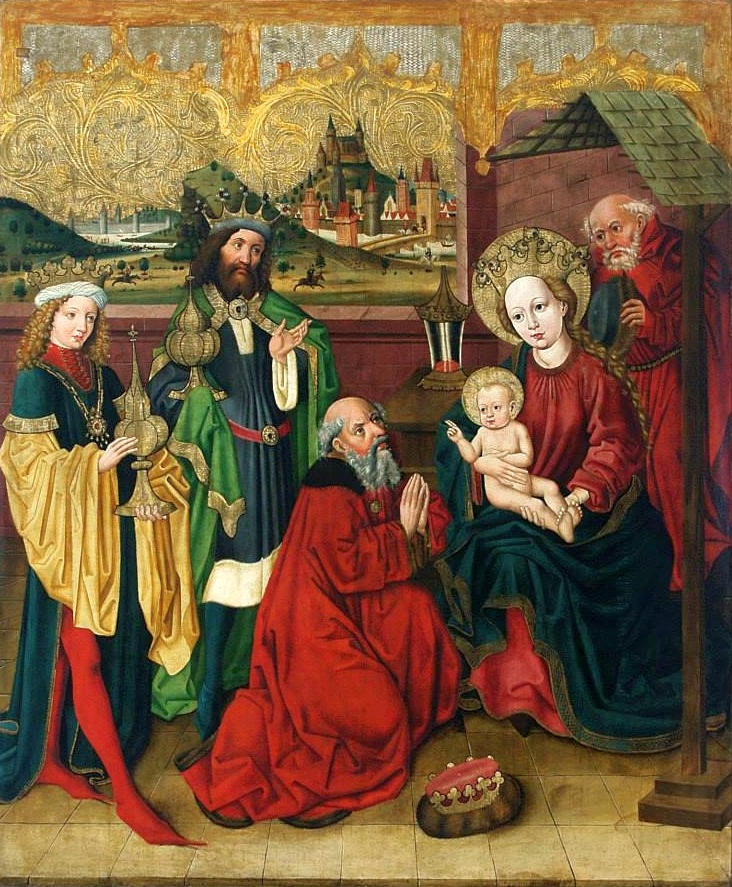
Nikolaus Obilman (1435–1488), c. 1466

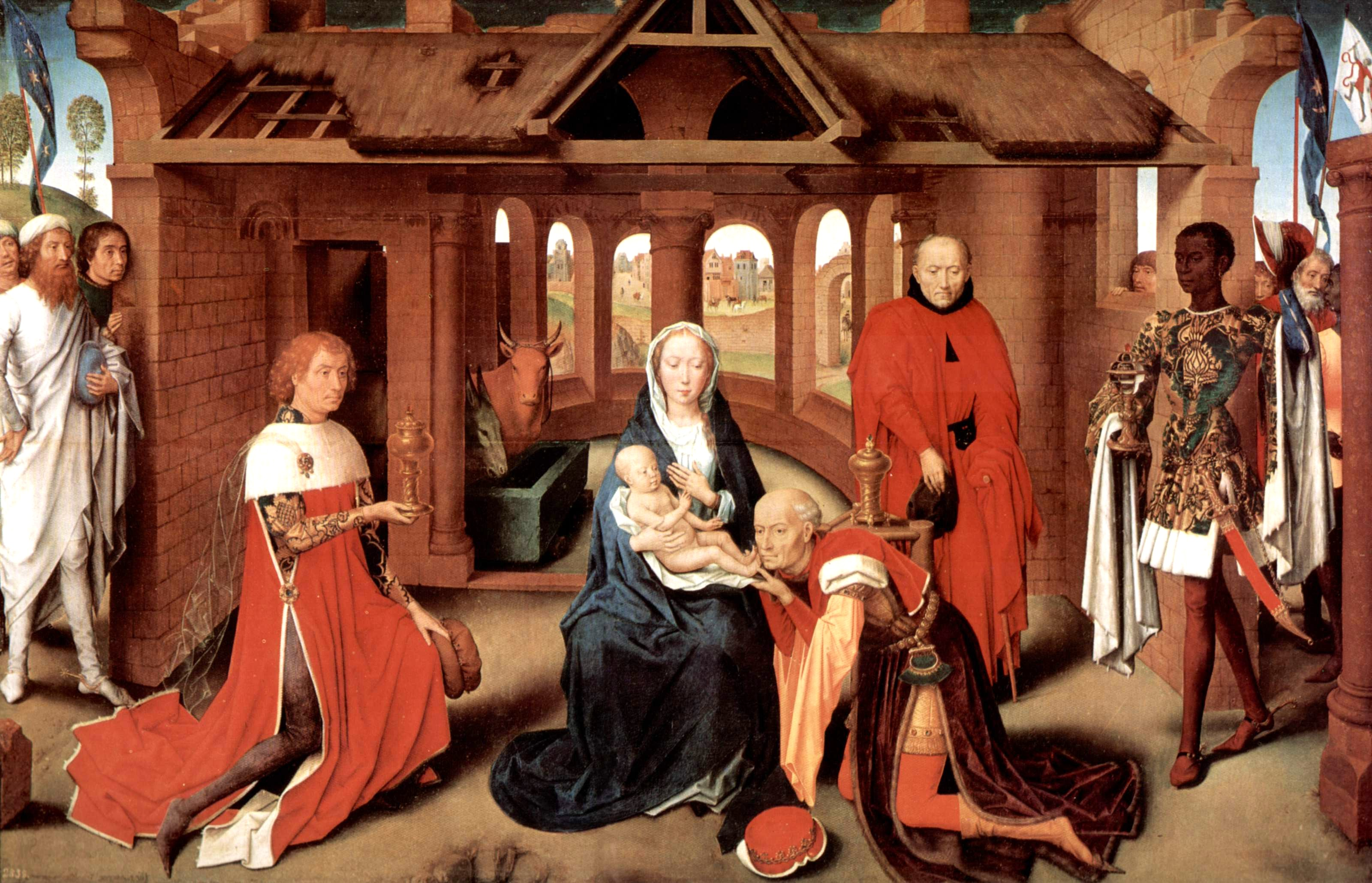
Hans Memling, 1470

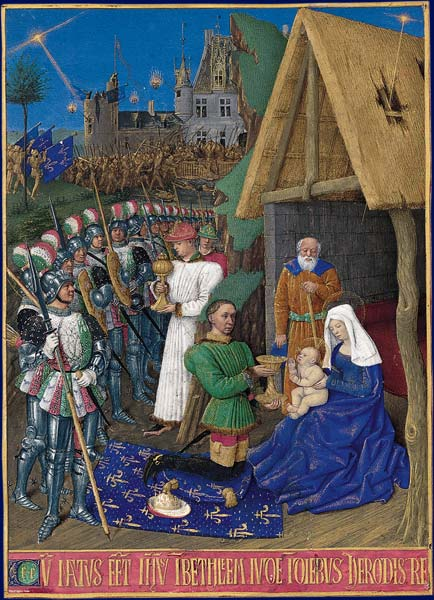
Jean Fouquet; one of the magi is King Charles VII of France

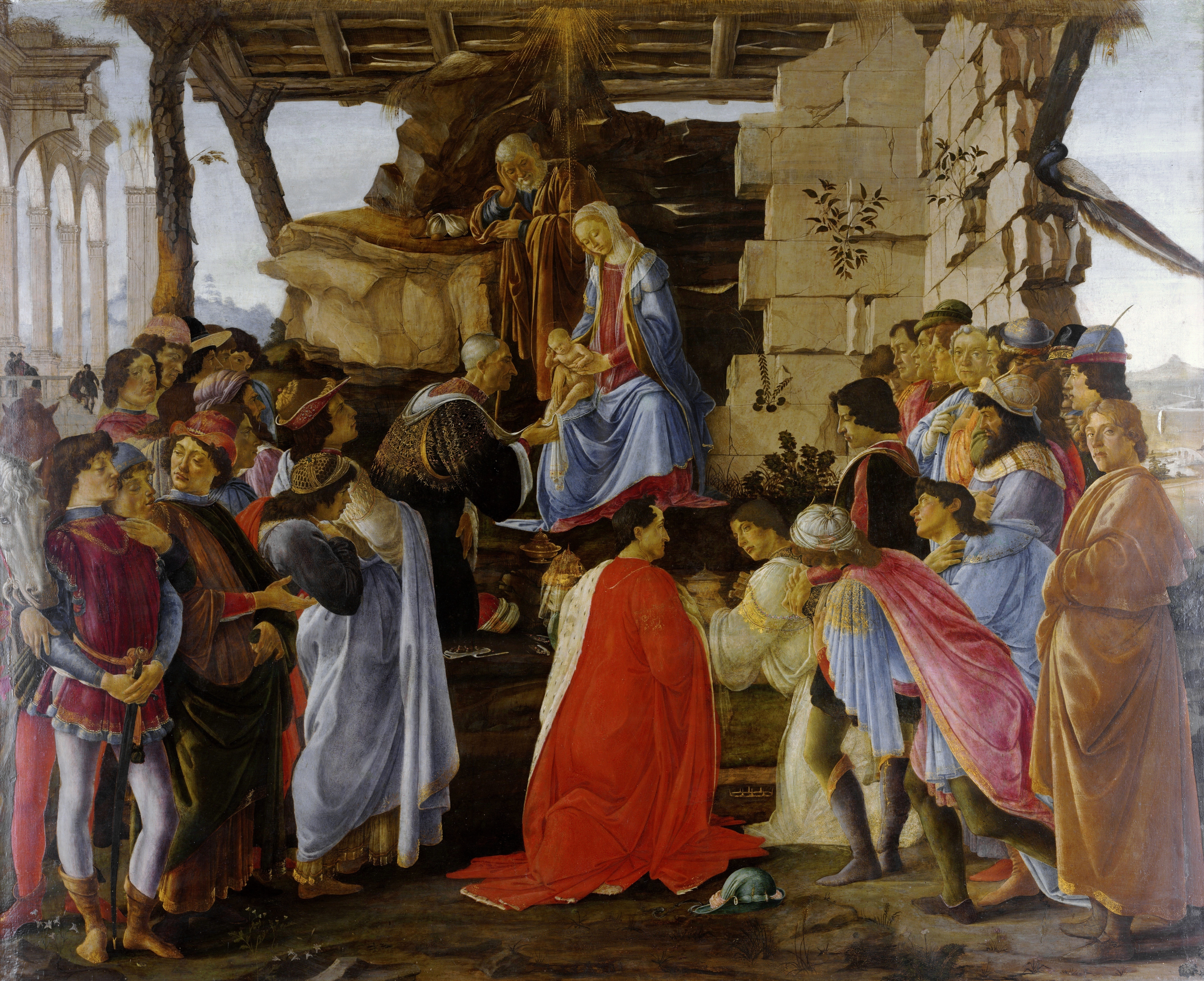
Botticelli, 1475

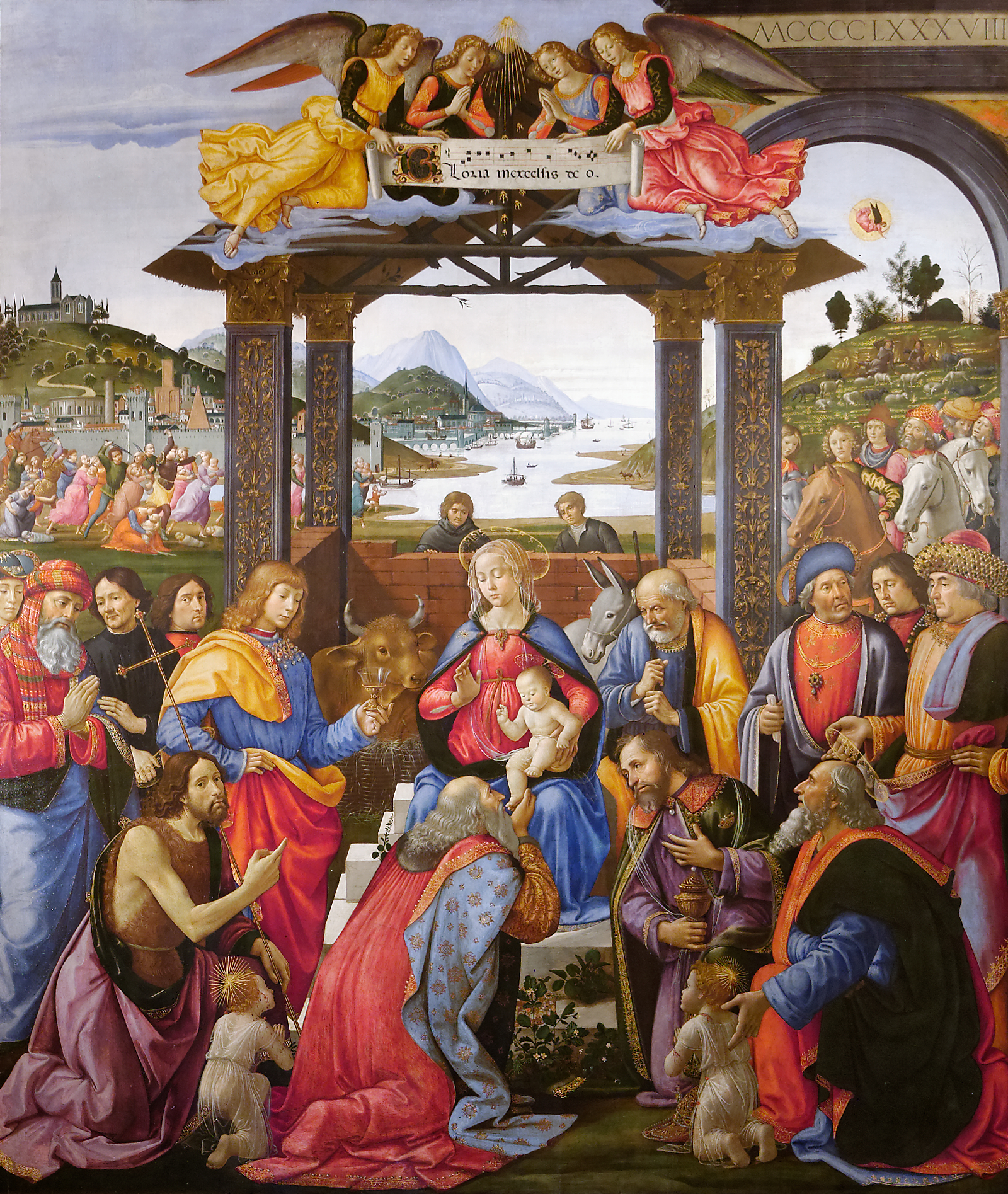
Domenico Ghirlandaio, 1485-88

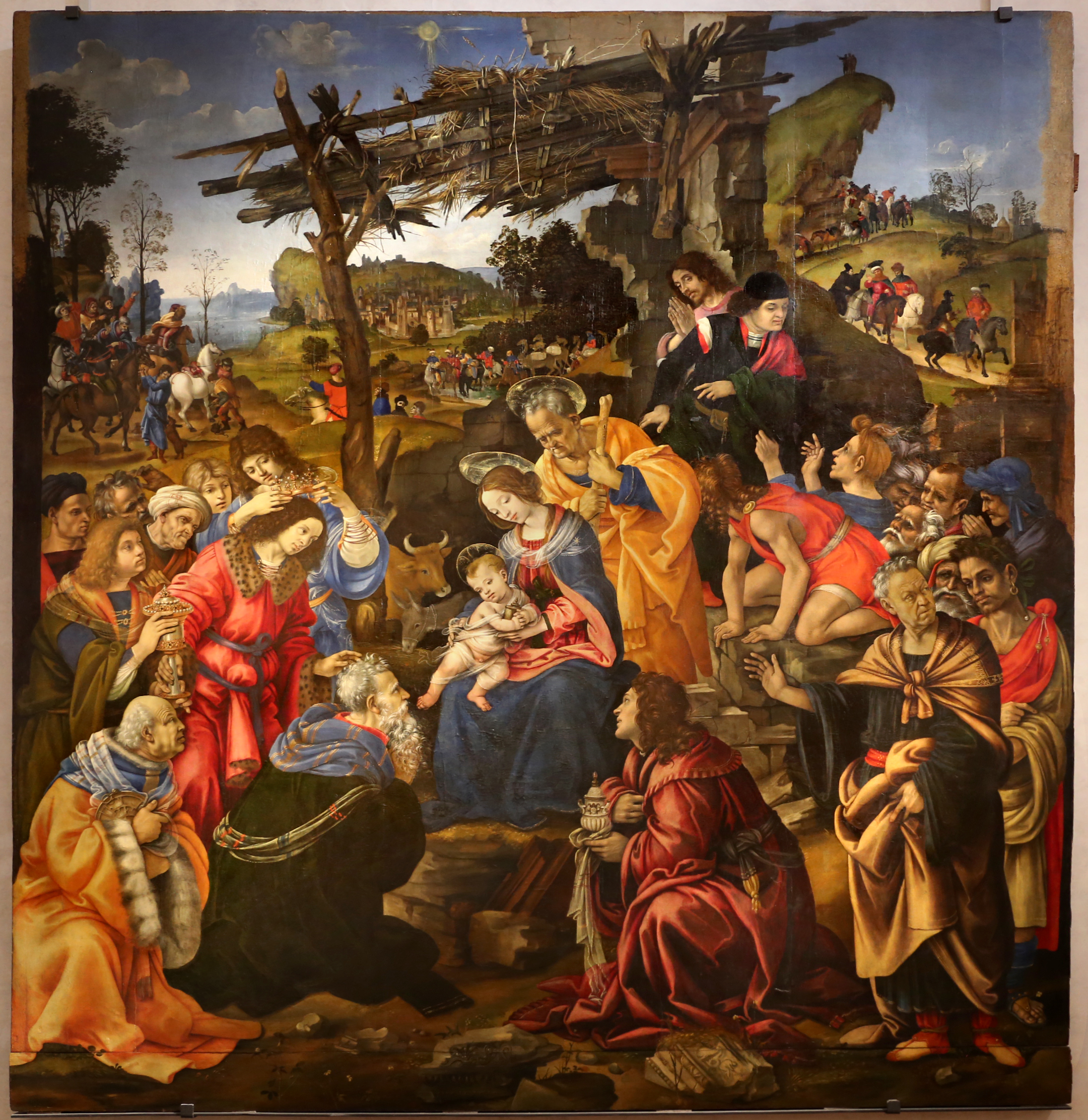
Adoration of the Magi by Filippino Lippi (1496)

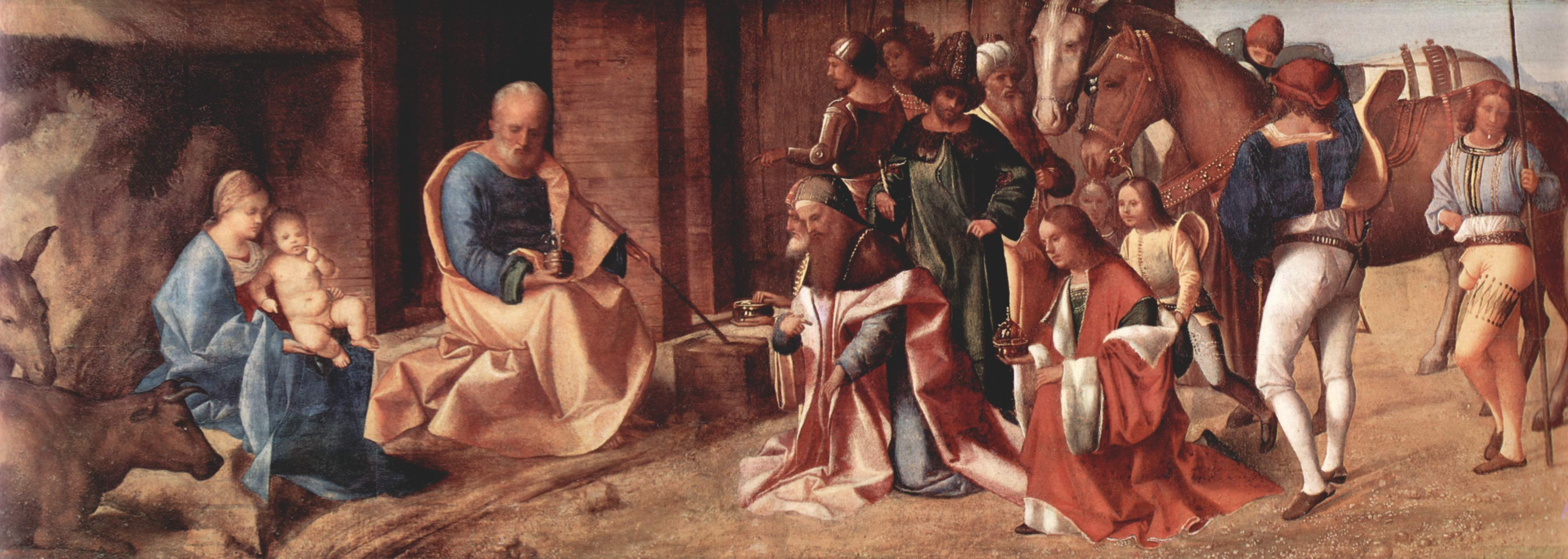
Giorgione, c. 1505

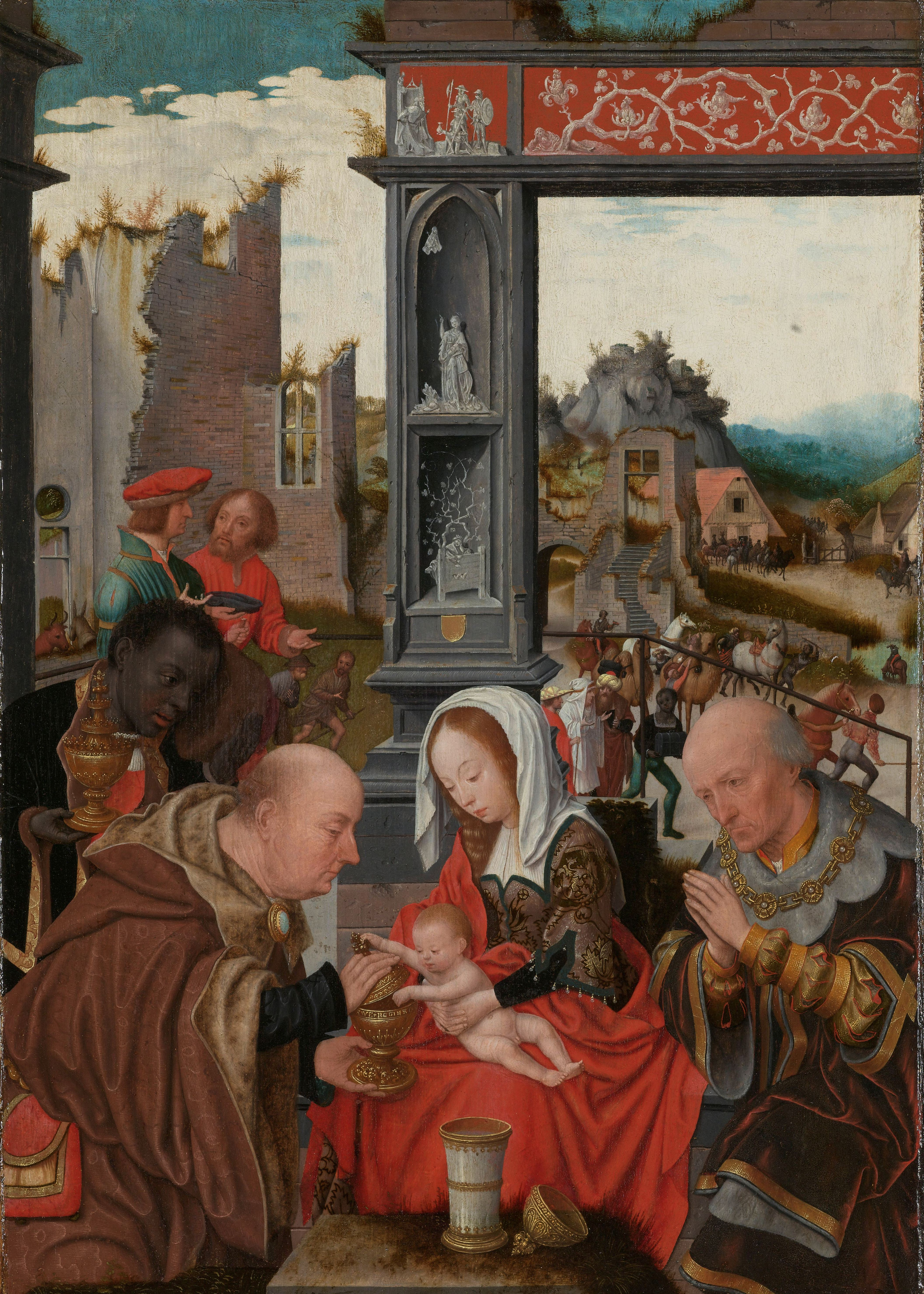
Adoration, Jan Mostaert, 1520s

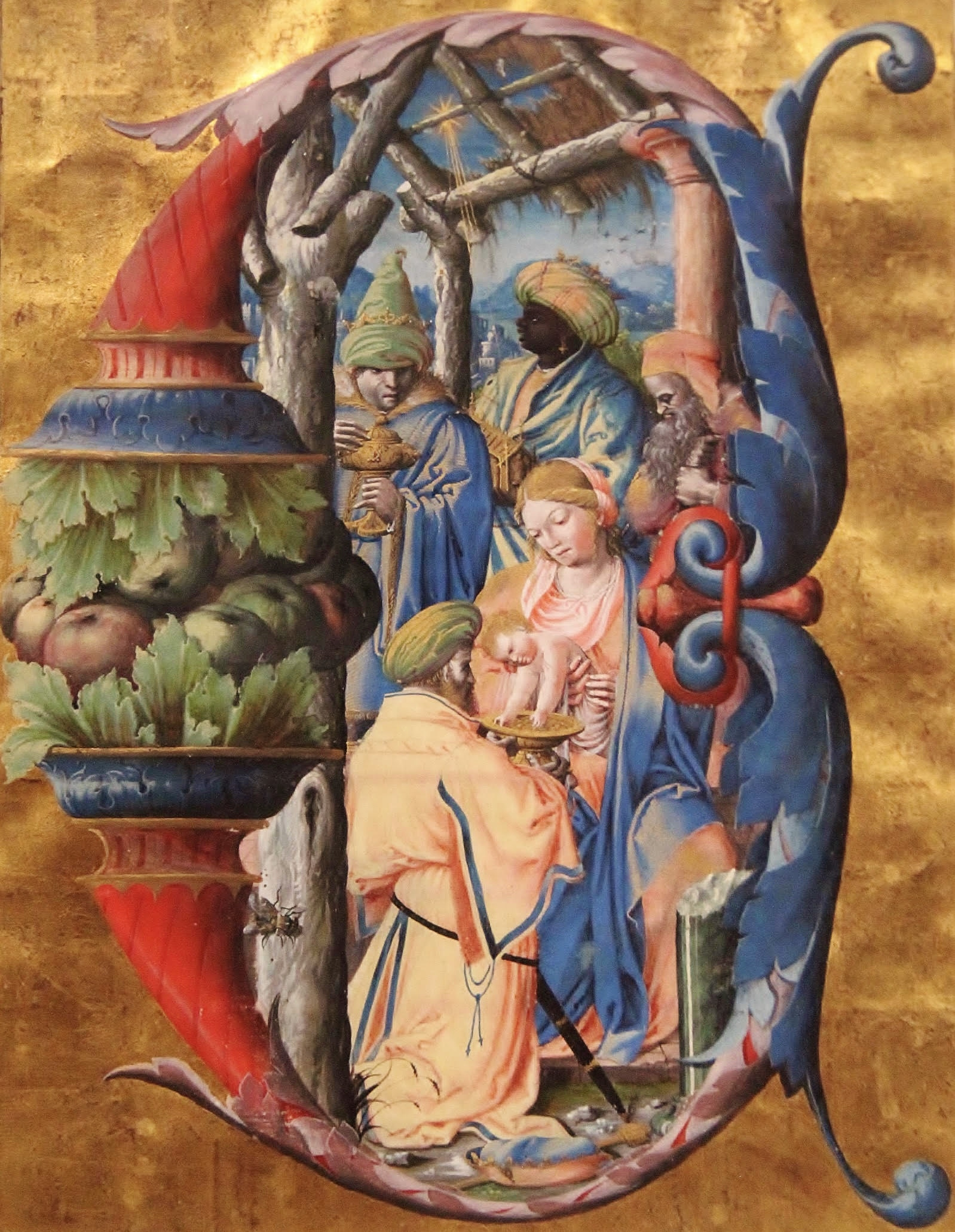
Illumination by Antoine Olivier, Toulouse, 1533-1535

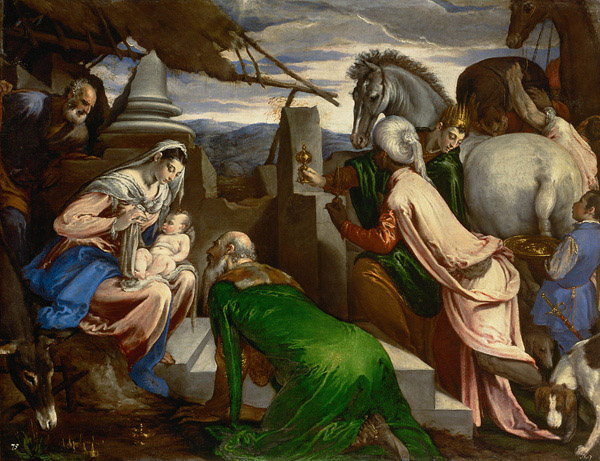
Jacopo Bassano, 1563–1564

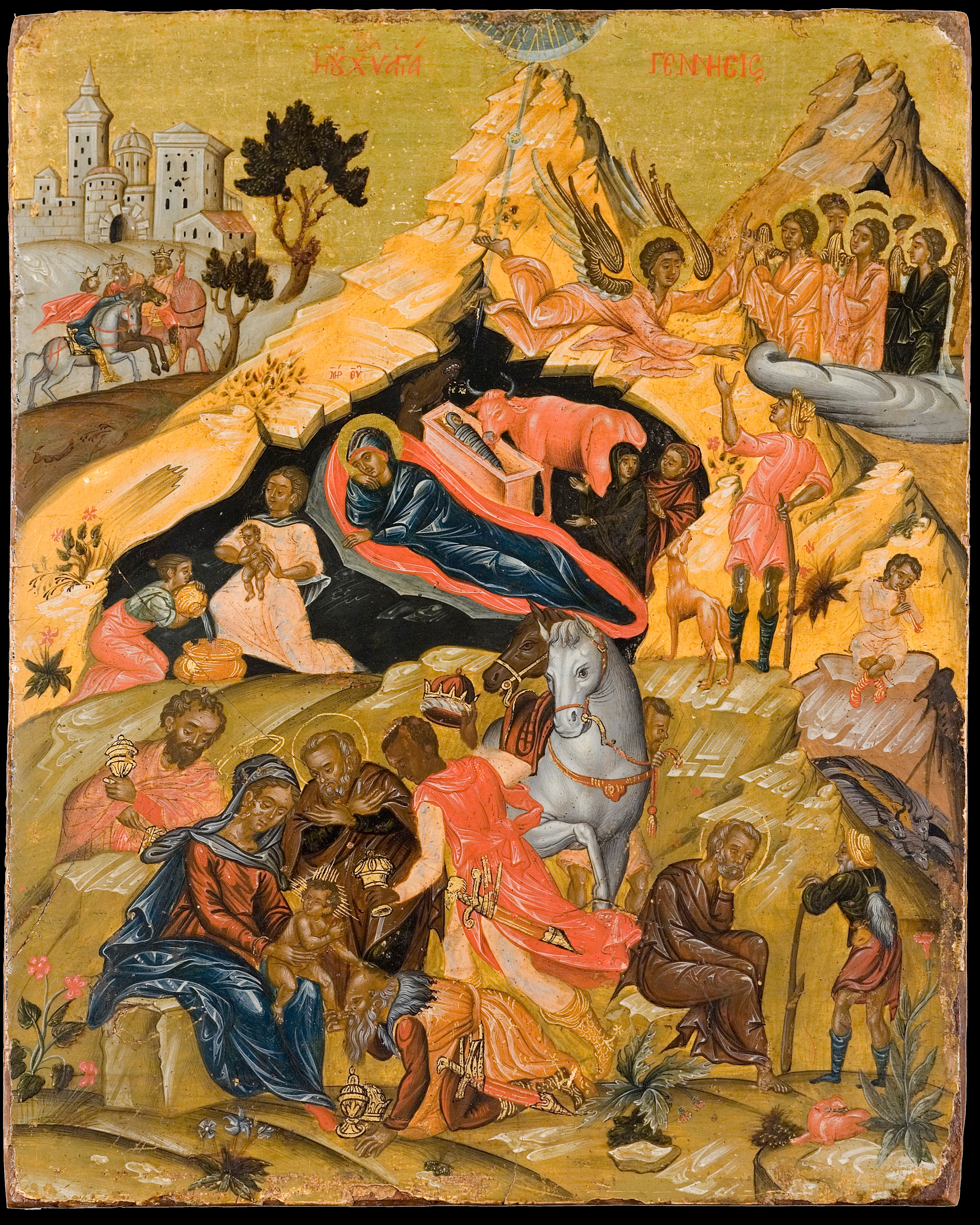
Icon, Cretan School, early 17th century

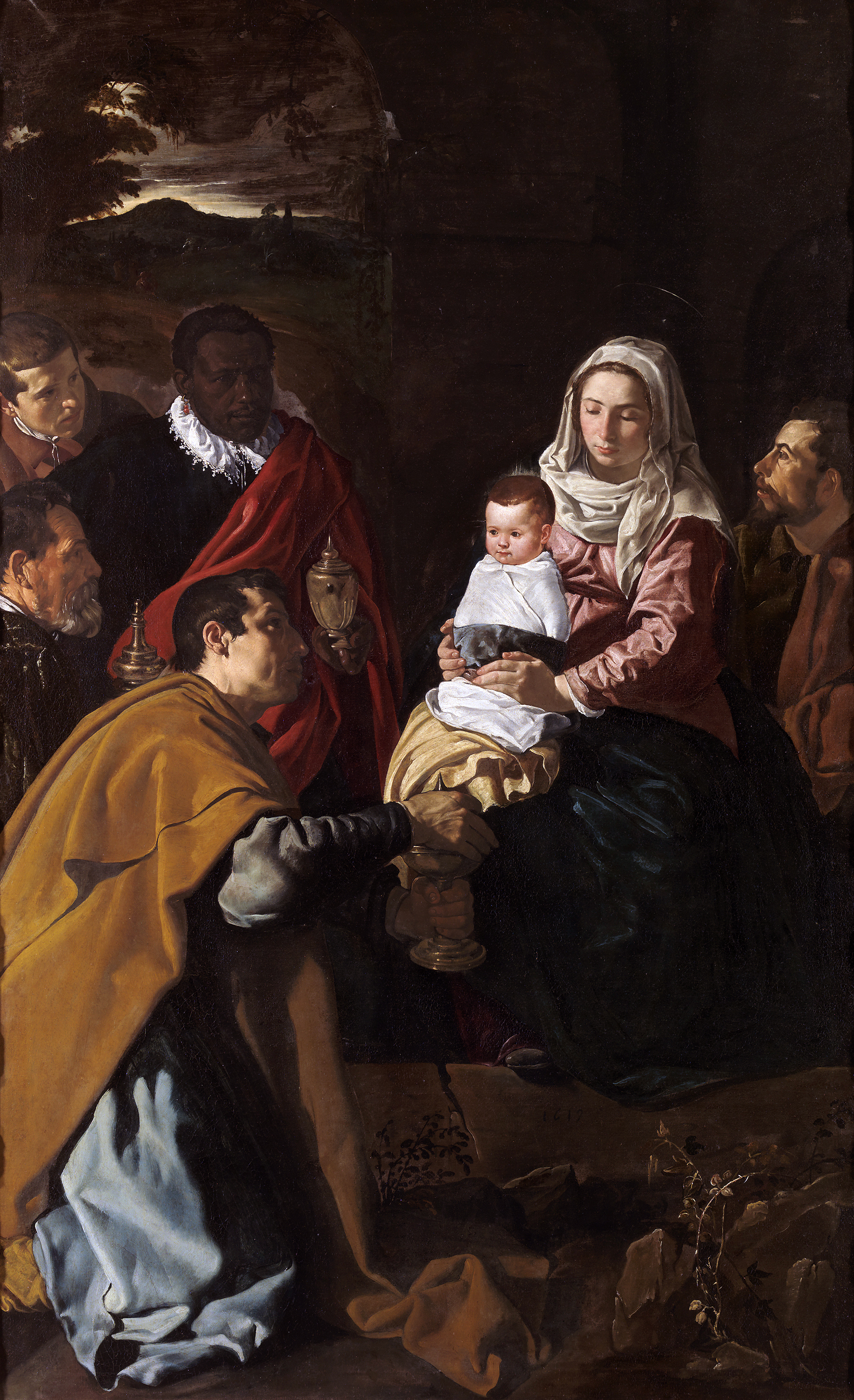
Diego Velázquez, 1619

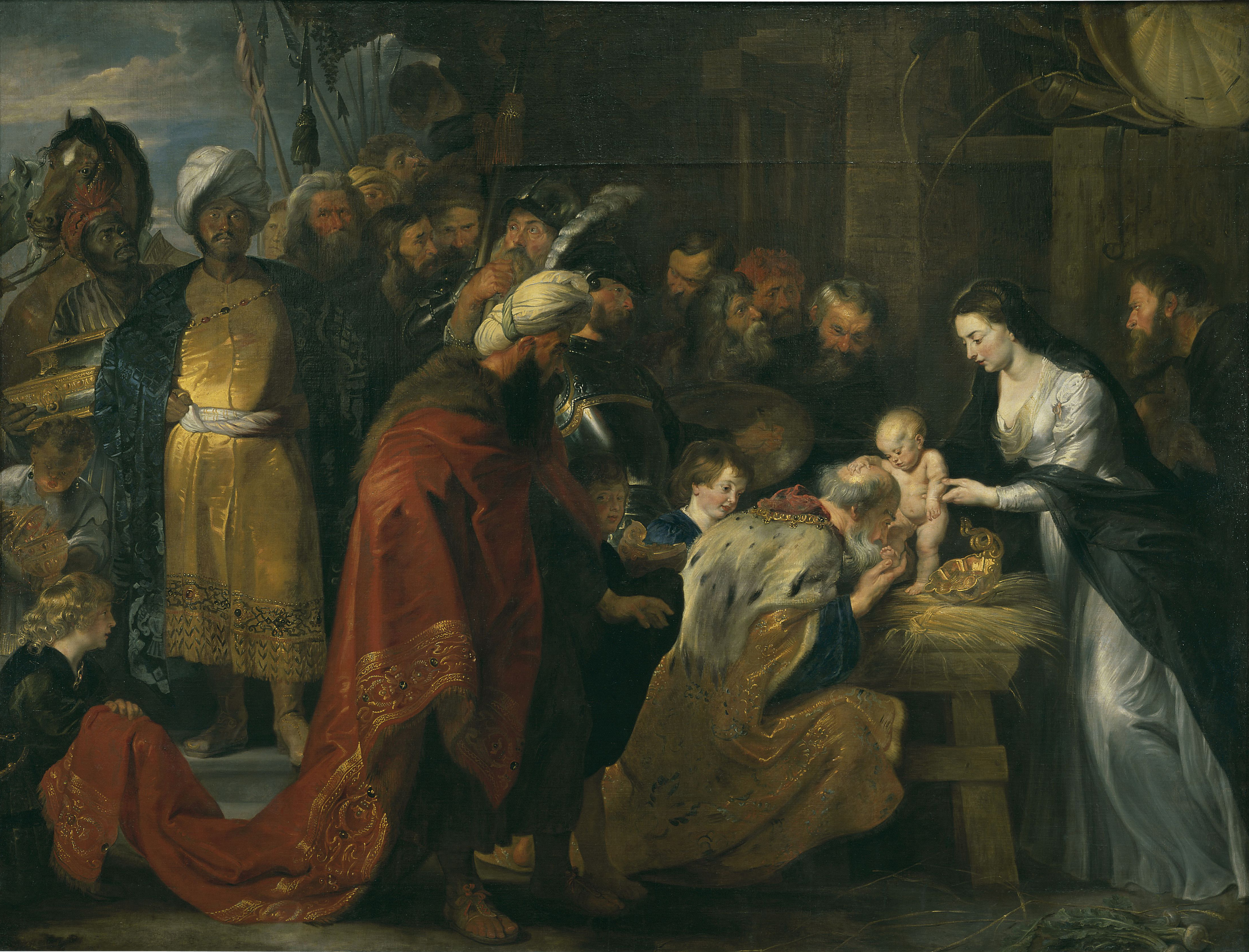
Rubens, Lyon, c. 1617–1618

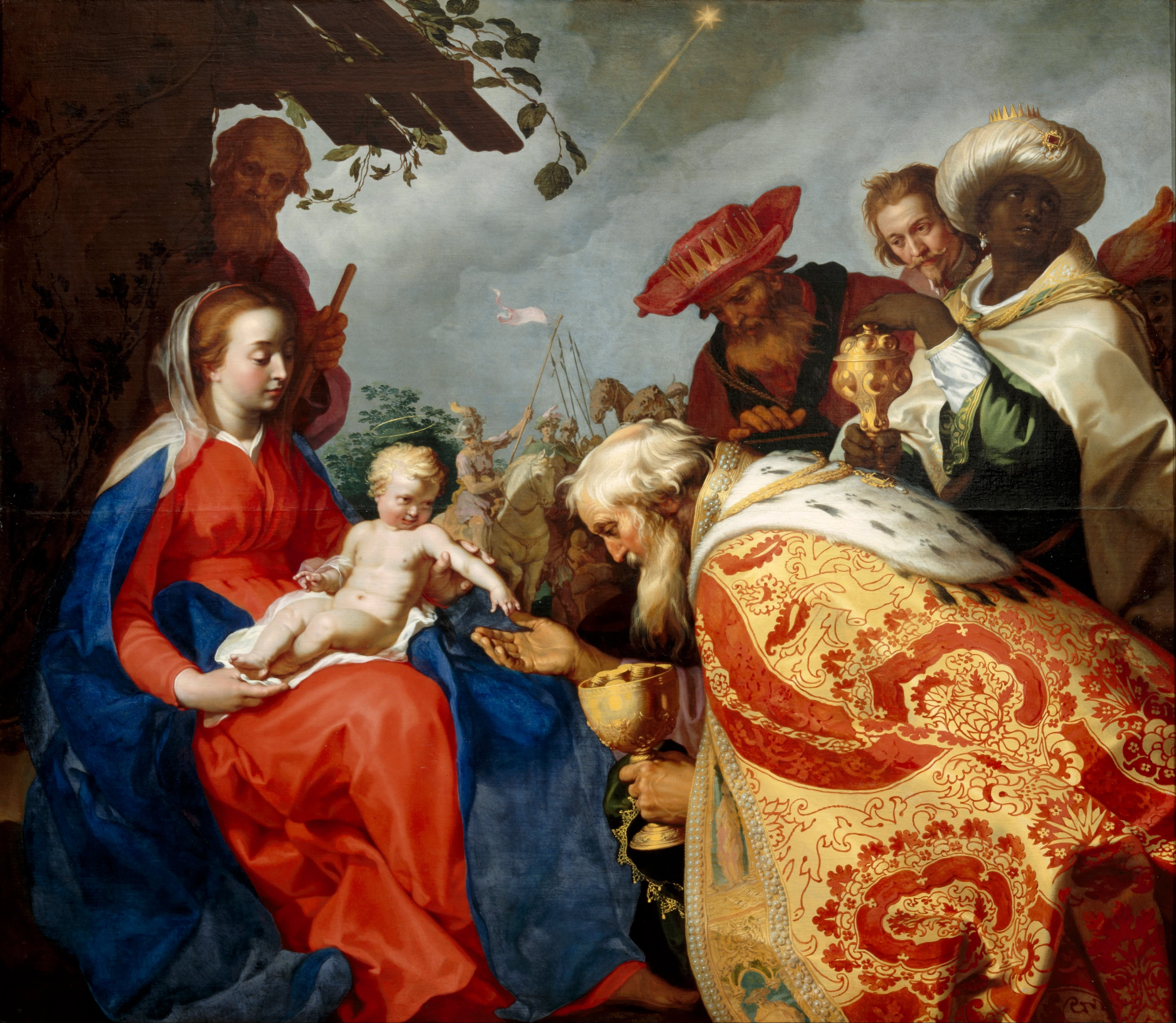
Abraham Bloemaert, 1624

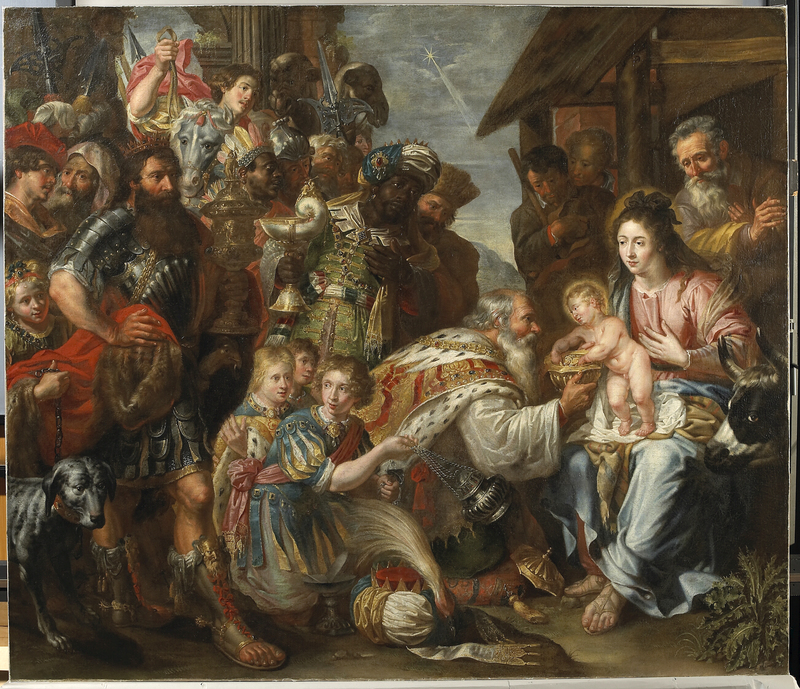
Pieter van Lint, 1630

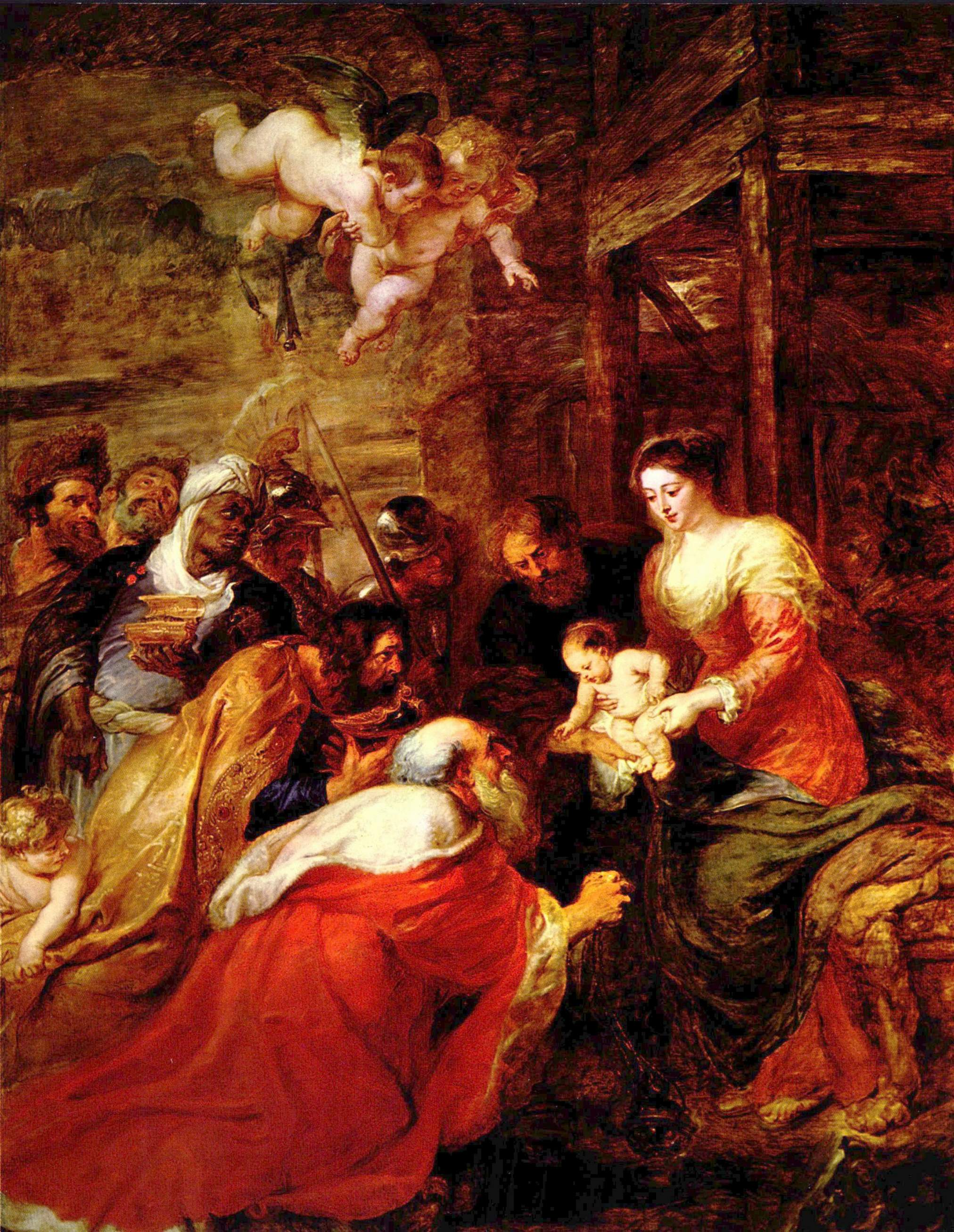
Rubens, Cambridge, 1634

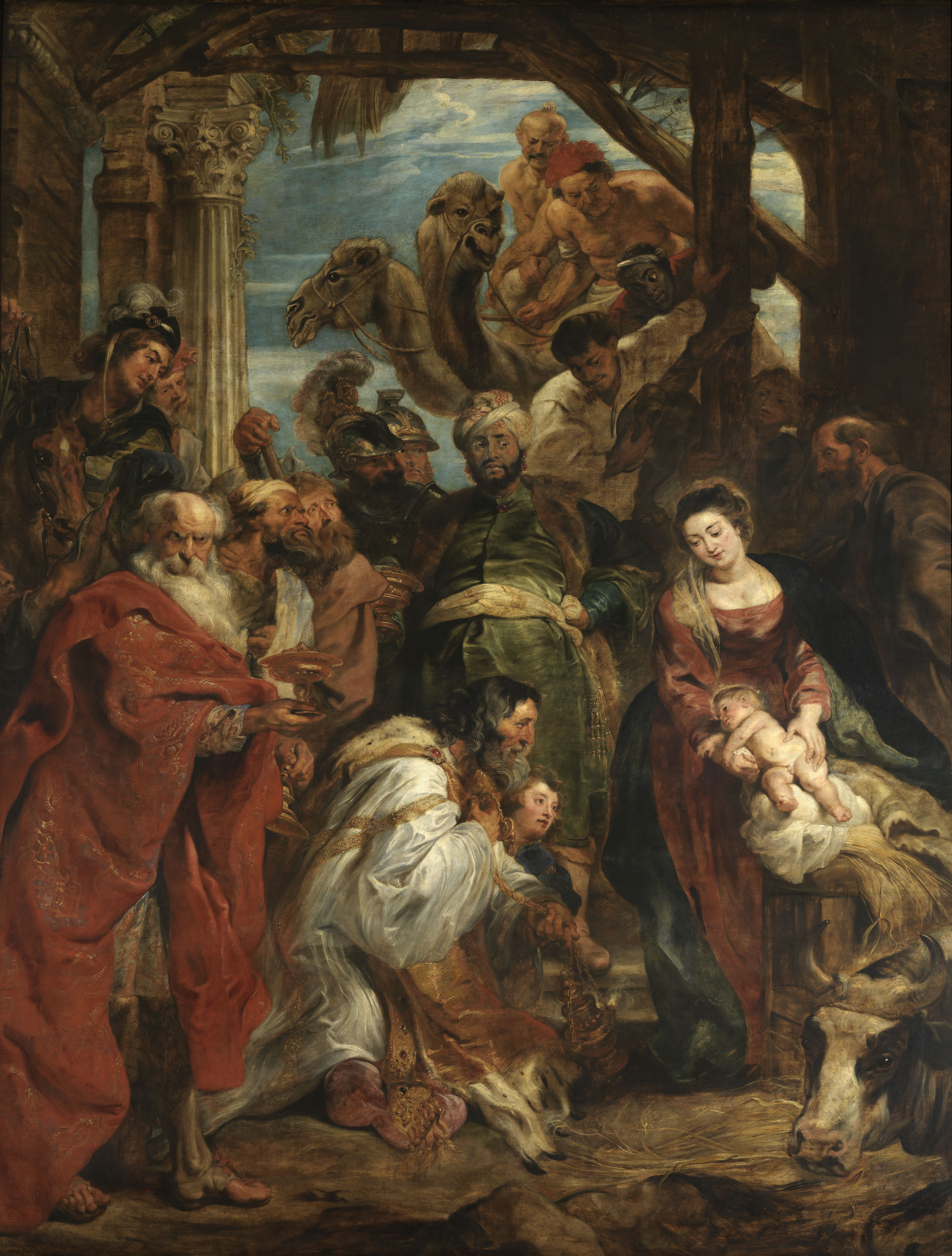
Rubens, 1624, in Royal Museum of Fine Arts Antwerp

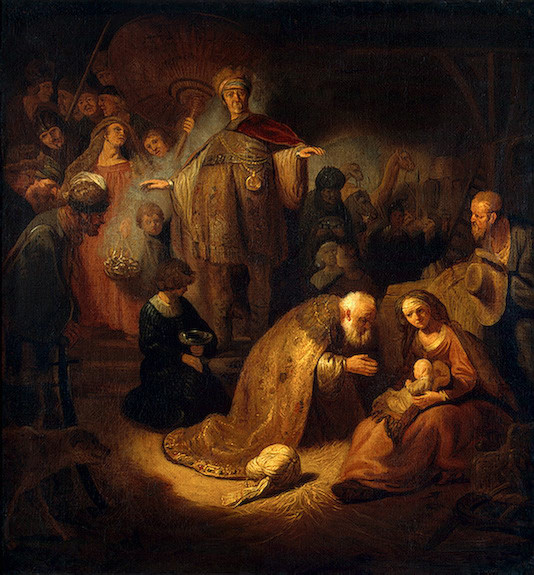
Rembrandt, 1632

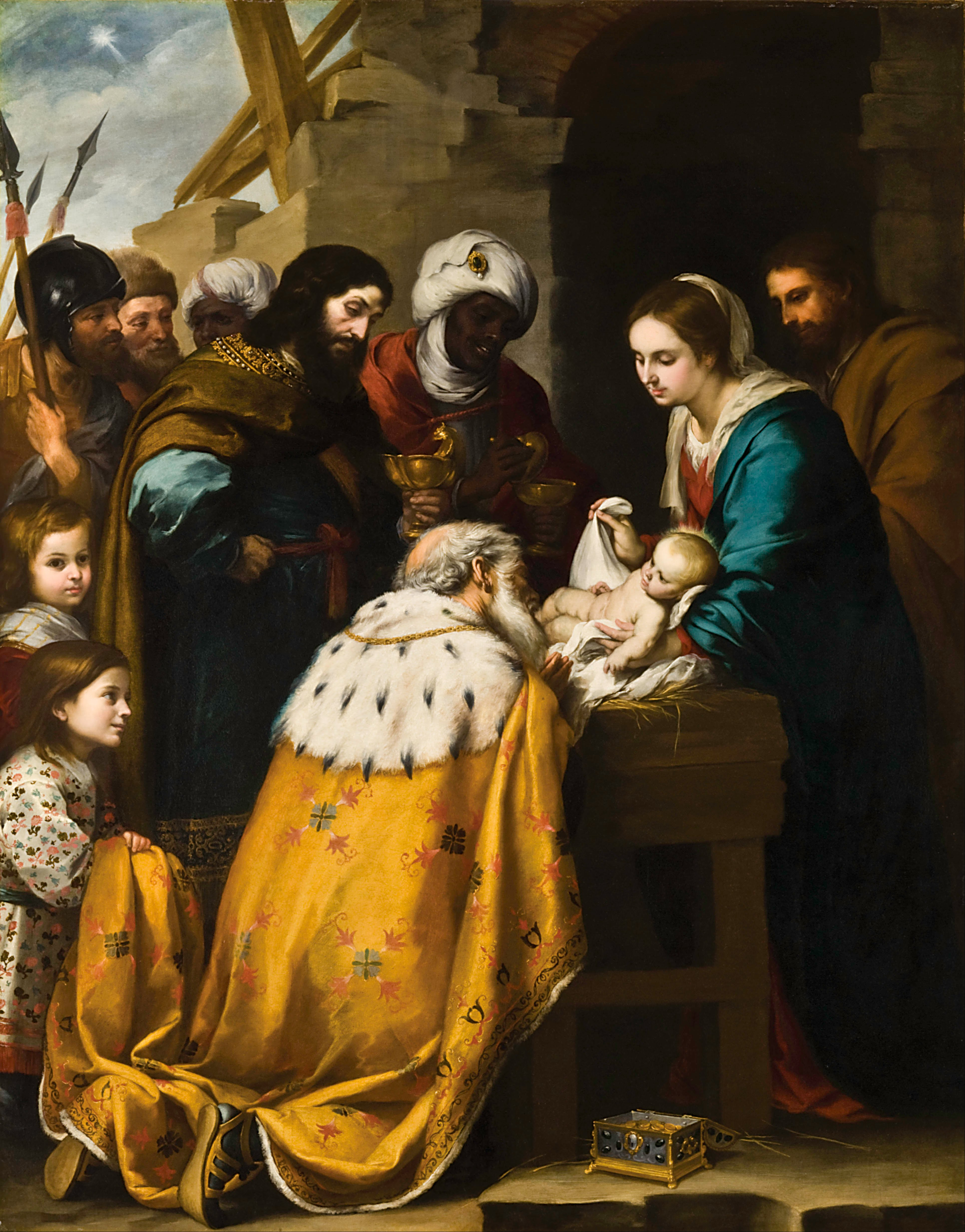
Bartolomé Esteban Murillo, 1655–1660

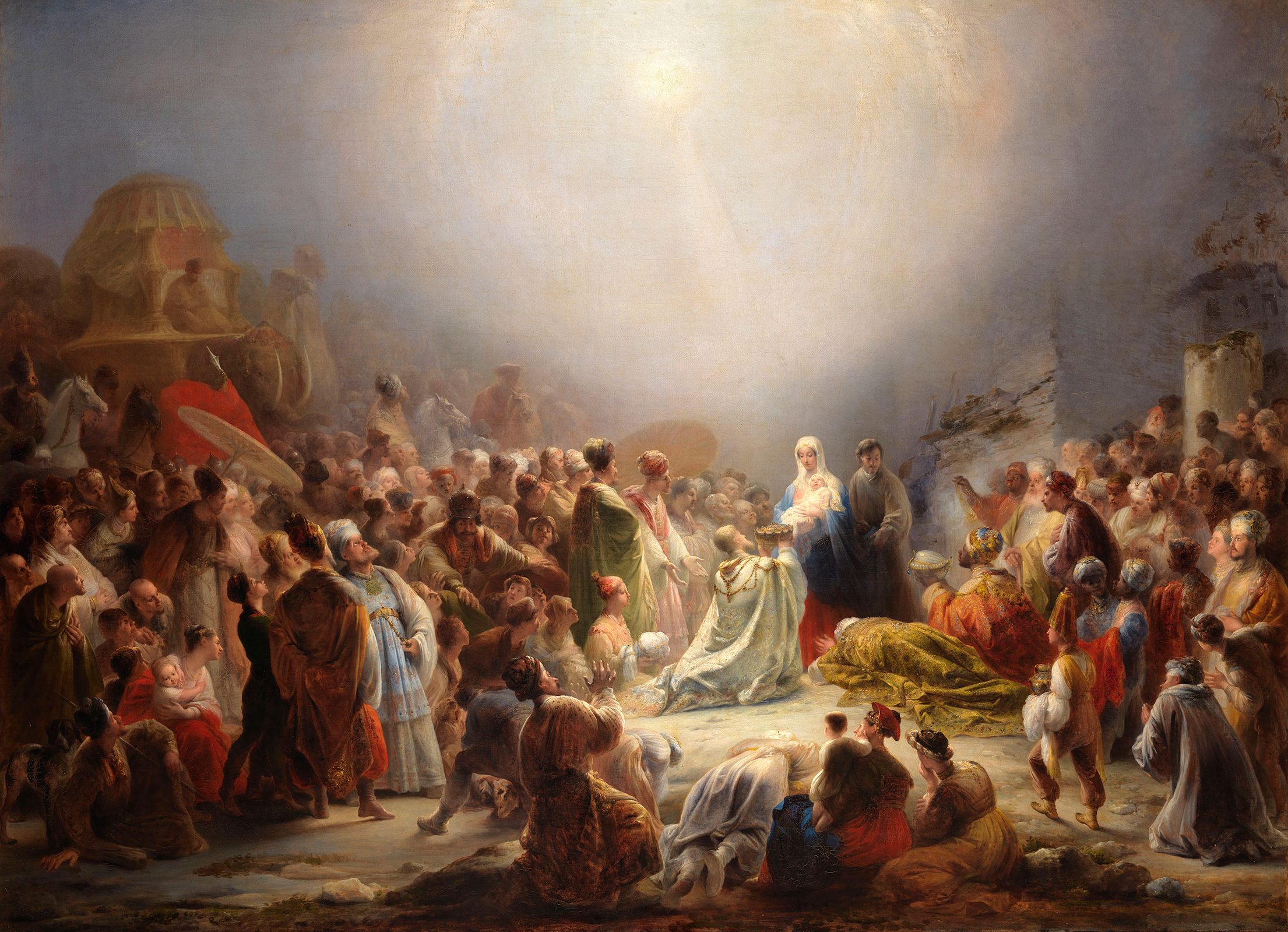
Domingos Sequeira, 1828

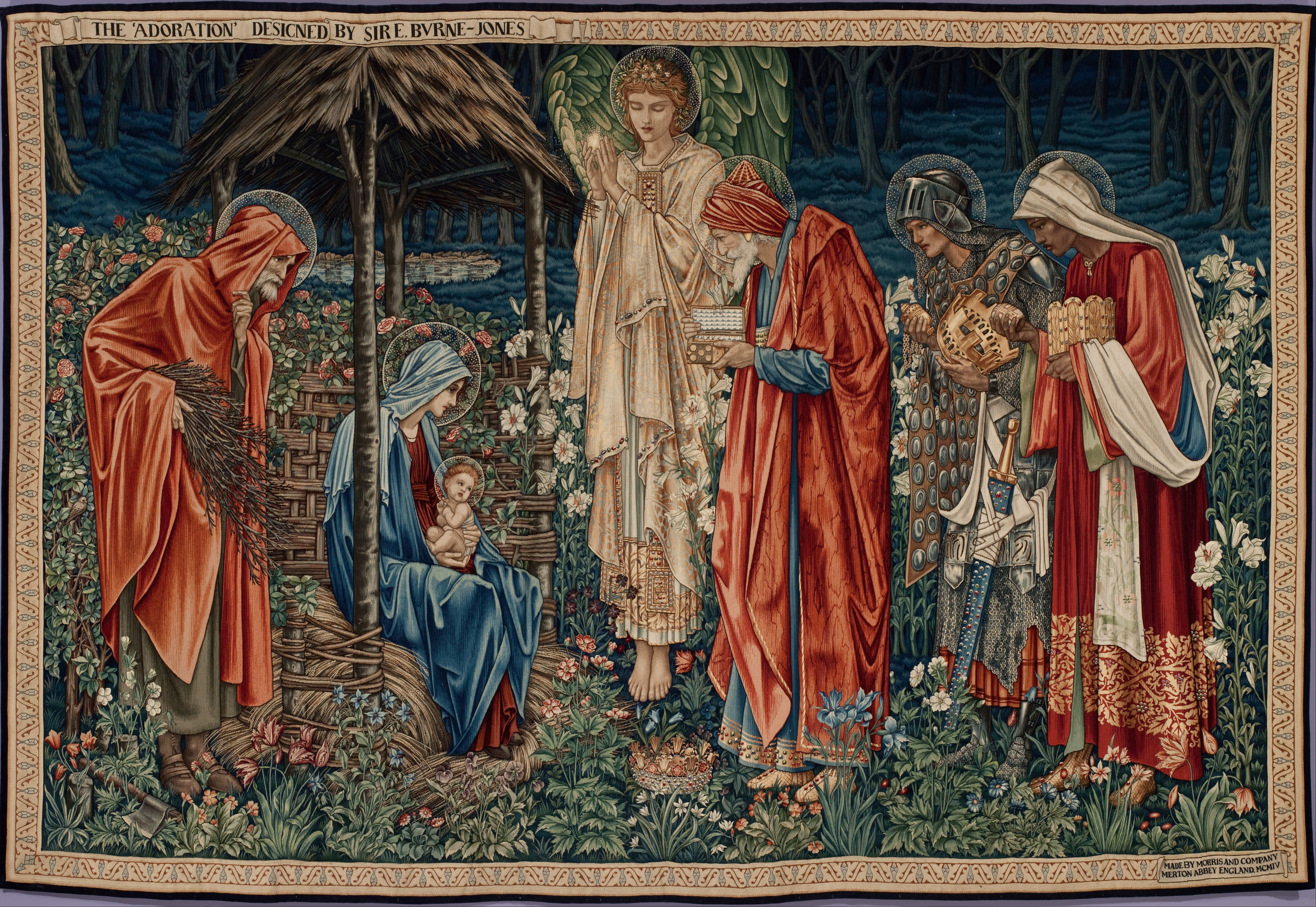
Tapestry, Edward Burne-Jones, Musée d'Orsay, 1887

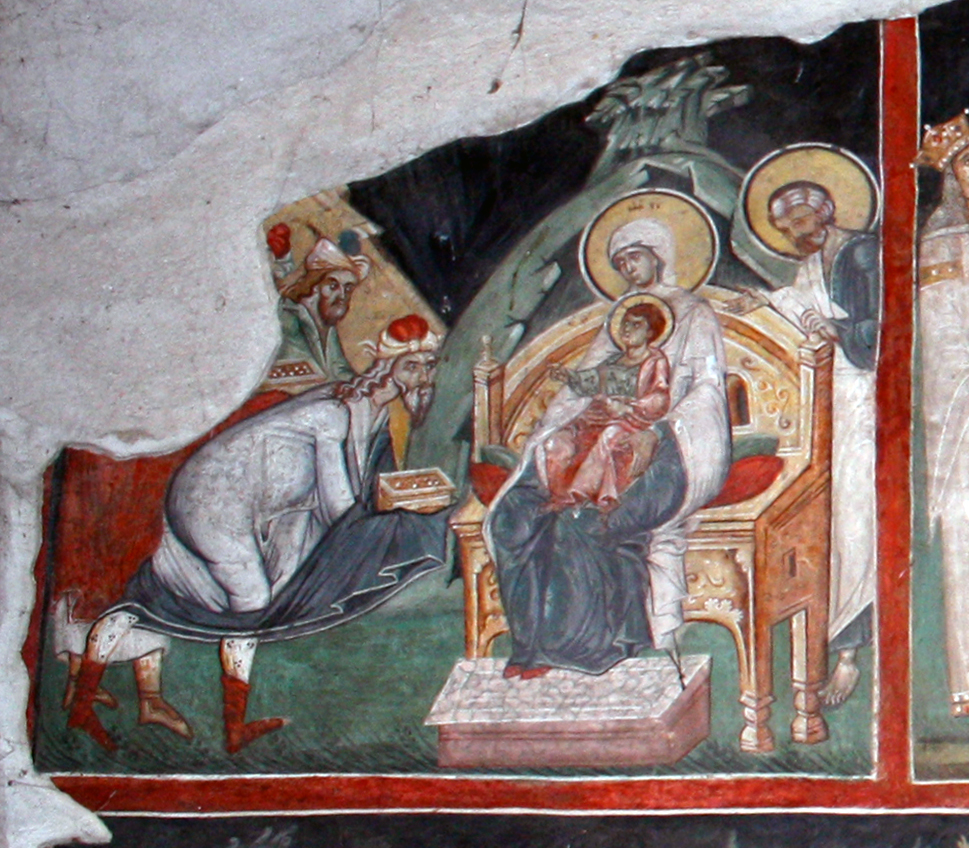
Fragment from medieval fresco, Kremikovtsi Monastery

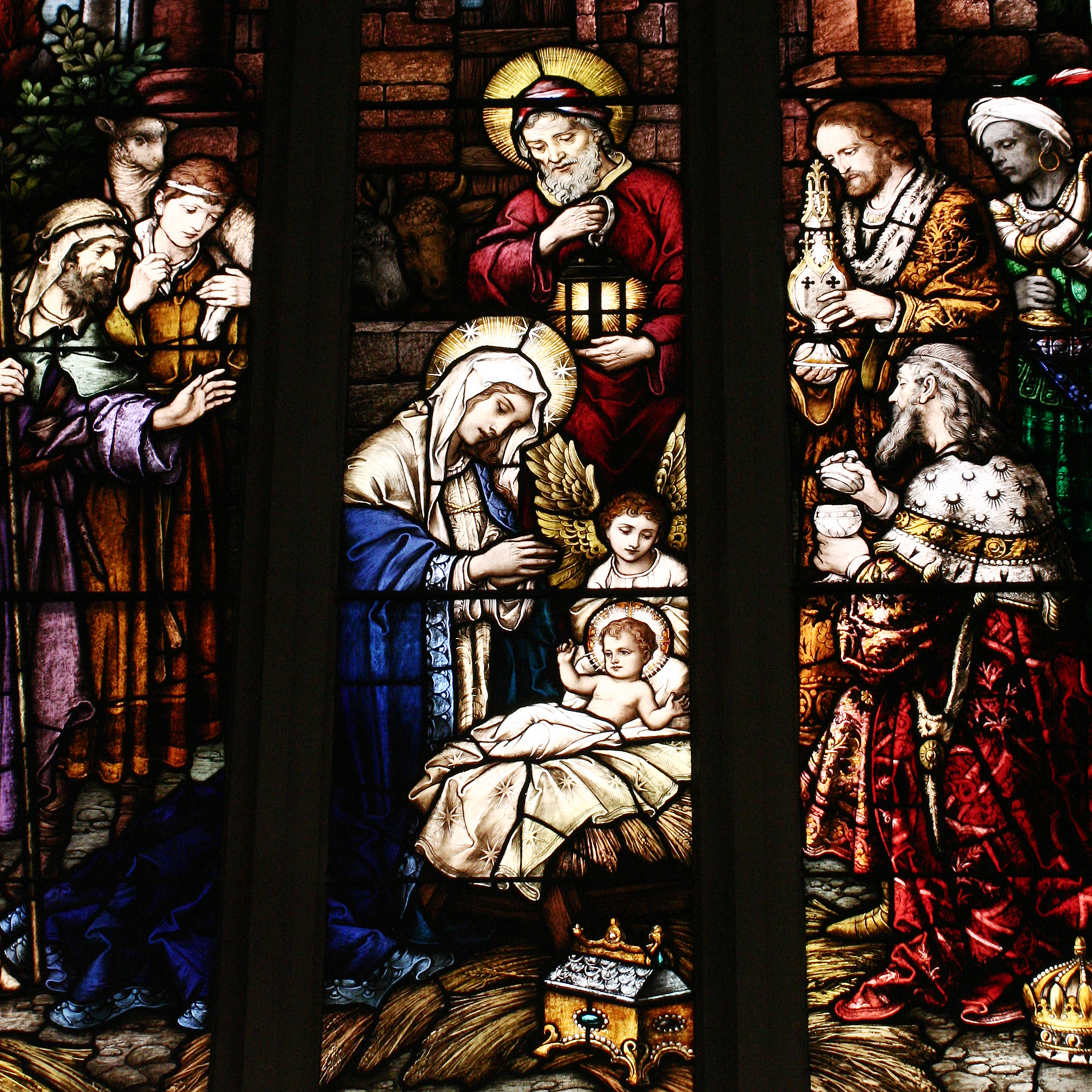
Stained glass, St. Michael's Cathedral (Toronto)

== See also ==
- Saint Joseph's dreams
- Star of Bethlehem
- Christmas
- Adoration of the Shepherds
- Salome (disciple)
- Cavalcade of Magi
- Eucharistic adoration
- Gospel harmony
