= Adoration of the Magi (Biscaino) =

Painting by Bartolomeo Biscaino

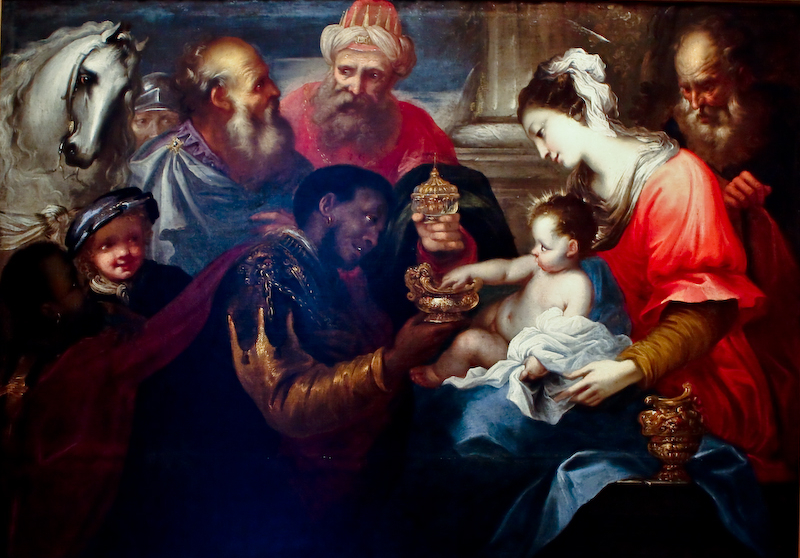
- Artist: Bartolomeo Biscaino
- Year: 1650s
- Medium: oil paint on canvas
- Movement: Baroque painting Catholic art
- Subject: Adoration of the Magi
- Dimensions: 124 cm × 173 cm (49 in × 68 in)
- Location: Musée des Beaux-Arts, Strasbourg
- Accession: 1878

The Adoration of the Magi is a 1650s religious painting by the Italian Baroque artist from Genoa, Bartolomeo Biscaino. It is now in the Musée des Beaux-Arts of Strasbourg, France, for which it was bought in 1878, shortly after the city had decided to rebuild its collections, which had been completely destroyed on 24 August 1870, in the fire of the Aubette during the Siege of Strasbourg. Accordingly, the painting's inventory number is 1.

Until 1959, the Adoration of the Magi had been thought to be a work by Valerio Castello (of whom the Strasbourg museum also owns a flamboyant Adoration of the Magi), but the attribution to Biscaino has been confirmed several times since. Although the painter was only about 22 years old when he painted the Strasbourg canvas—dying shortly thereafter—the work is a perfectly achieved example of Ligurian Baroque, blending influences of Parmigianino and Correggio with those of Rubens and Van Dyck.
