= Adoration of the Magi (Castello) =

Painting by Valerio Castello

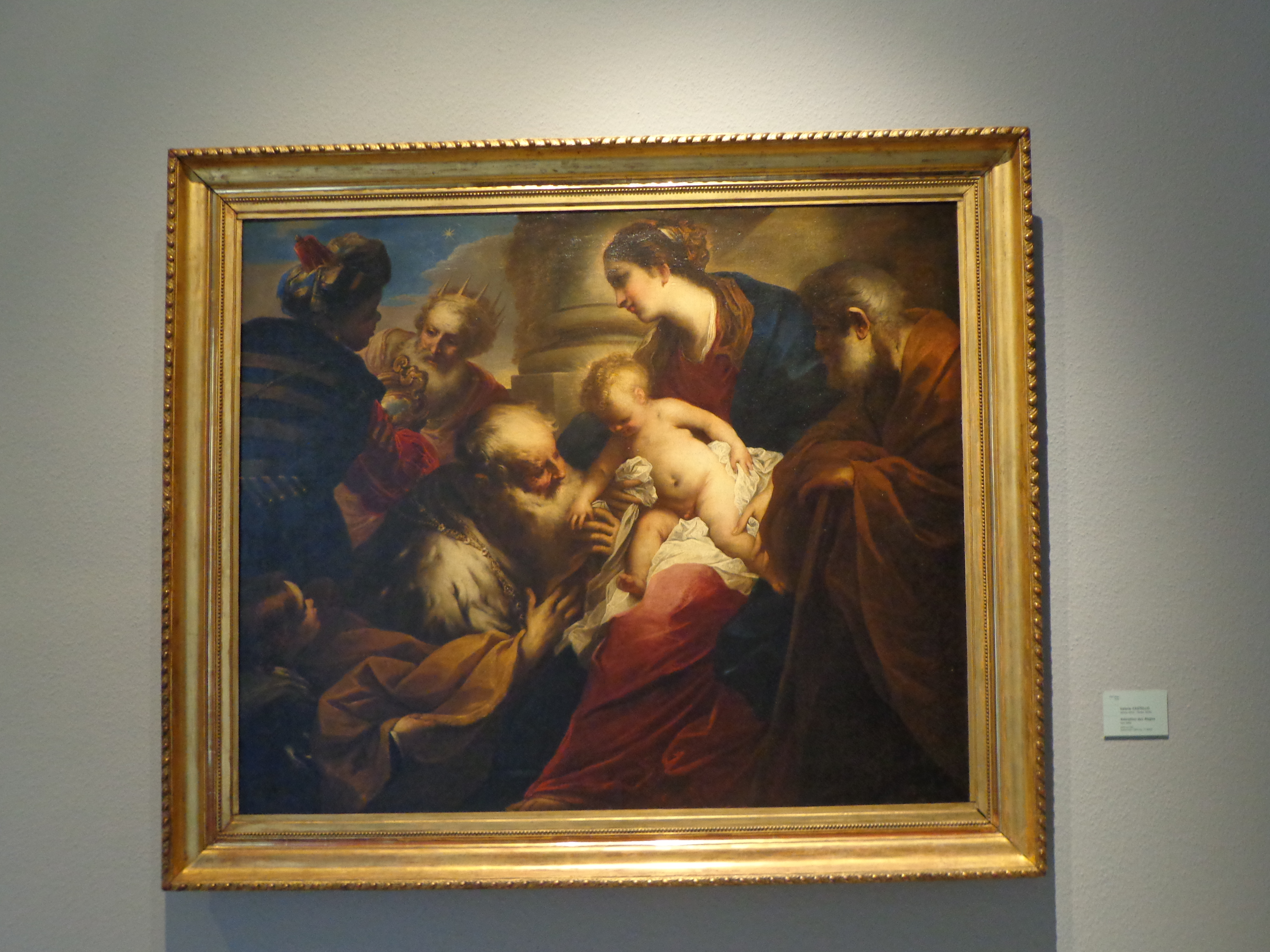
- Artist: Valerio Castello
- Year: circa 1650
- Medium: oil paint on canvas
- Movement: Baroque painting Catholic art
- Subject: Adoration of the Magi
- Dimensions: 122 cm × 148 cm (48 in × 58 in)
- Location: Musée des Beaux-Arts, Strasbourg
- Accession: before 1914

The Adoration of the Magi is a circa 1650 religious painting by the Italian Baroque artist from Genoa, Valerio Castello. It is now in the Musée des Beaux-Arts of Strasbourg, France. Its inventory number is 1830.

The Adoration of the Magi is today considered a brilliant example of Ligurian Baroque, and three documented ancient copies have been identified. Strangely enough, the painting had an utterly inconspicuous existence until 2004, when it was identified as a major work by Castello – it had been passed off as a "Dutch painting with Italian influences" since 1949. The Strasbourg museum also owns an Adoration of the Magi by Castello's disciple and assistant Bartolomeo Biscaino; that work had been attributed to Castello until 1959.
