= Giovanni Paolo Cervetto =

Italian painter

Giovanni Paolo Cervetto (died 1657) was an Italian painter of the Baroque period. He was very active in his native Genoa. He was pupil of Valerio Castelli, and his works were difficult to separate from his master. He died young, likely from the Bubonic Plague that afflicted Genoa in 1657.
