= Biscayne =

Biscayne may refer to:

- Biscayne, an ethnonym and demonym meaning a Basque or hailing from the seigniory or province of Biscay.
- Biscayne language, an early modern synonym for the Basque language.

== Places ==
=== Belize ===
- Biscayne, Belize, a village in the Belize district

=== South Florida ===
- Key Biscayne, an island in Miami-Dade County
  - Key Biscayne, Florida, a village on Key Biscayne island
- Biscayne Bay, a lagoon on the Atlantic coast, bounded in part by Key Biscayne
  - Biscayne Aquifer, a body of permeable rock
  - Biscayne Boulevard, a section of highway US-1
  - Camp Biscayne, a winter resort in Coconut Grove, 1903-1925
  - Biscayne Island, Miami Beach, Florida, westernmost of the Venetian Islands in Biscayne Bay
  - Biscayne Landing, a mixed use commercial/hotel/residential community being developed in North Miami
  - Biscayne National Park, a U.S. National Park
  - Biscayne Park, Florida, a village in Miami-Dade County

== Other uses ==
- Chevrolet Biscayne, a series of automobiles.
- USS Biscayne (AVP-11), a United States Navy seaplane tender in commission from 1941 to 1946

== See also ==
- Biscayan, dialect of Basque
