= Giovanni Andrea Biscaino =

Italian painter

Giovanni Andrea Biscaino was an Italian painter of the Baroque period, described by the Grove Dictionary of Art as a "mediocre landscape painter". He was born in Genoa. He was the father and teacher of the painter, etcher and draughtsman Bartolomeo Biscaino. He died at Genoa of the plague in 1657.

== Sources ==
- Bryan, Michael (1886). Robert Edmund Graves (ed.). Dictionary of Painters and Engravers, Biographical and Critical. Vol. I: A-K. London: George Bell and Sons. p. 130.
