= Nectalí Vizcaíno =

Colombian footballer (born 1977)

Nectalí Vizcaino Nieto (born July 8, 1977) is a Colombian former professional footballer who played as a centre-back.
