= Valerio Castello =

Italian painter (1624–1659)

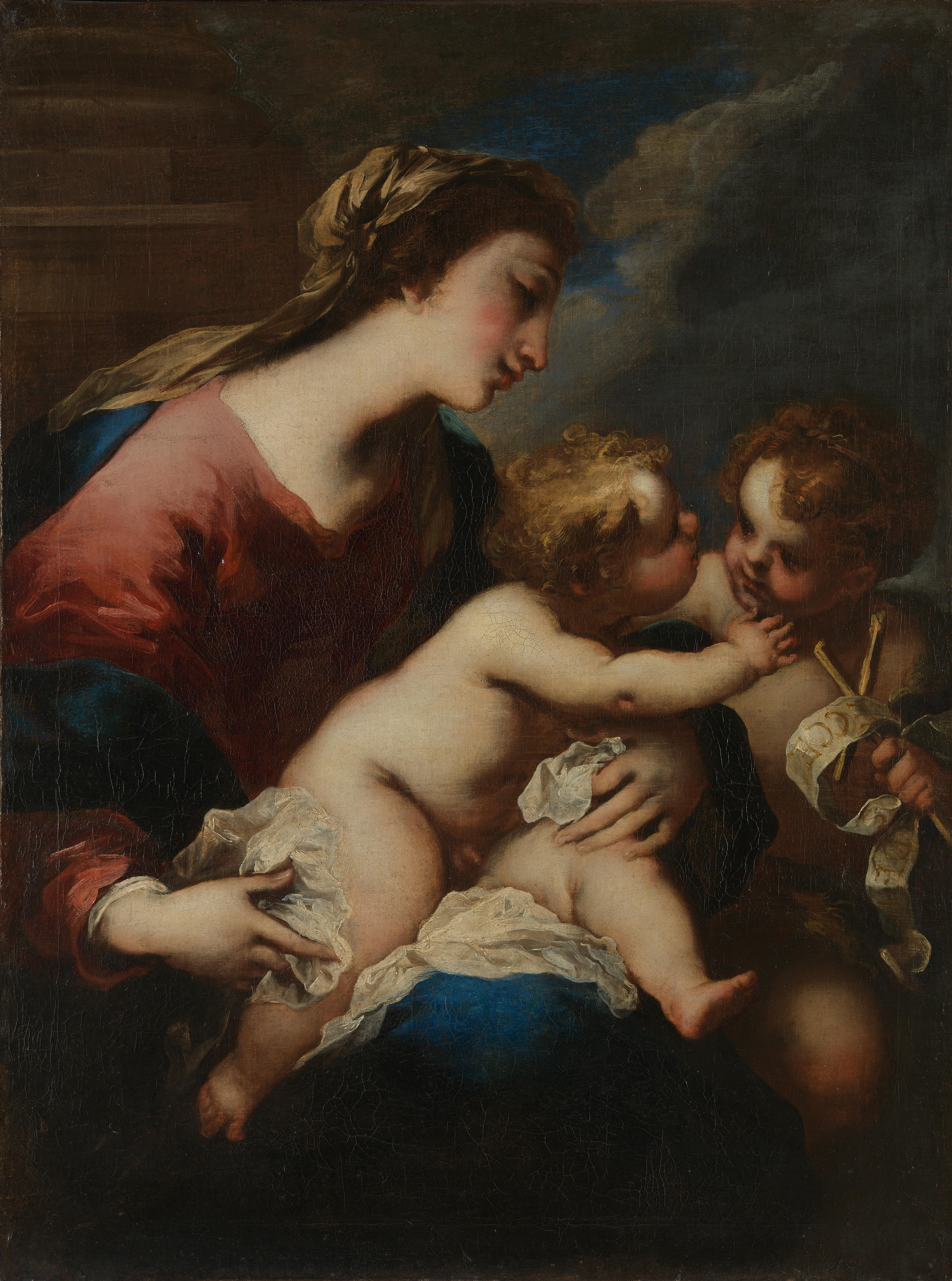
The Virgin and Child with Saint John the Baptist

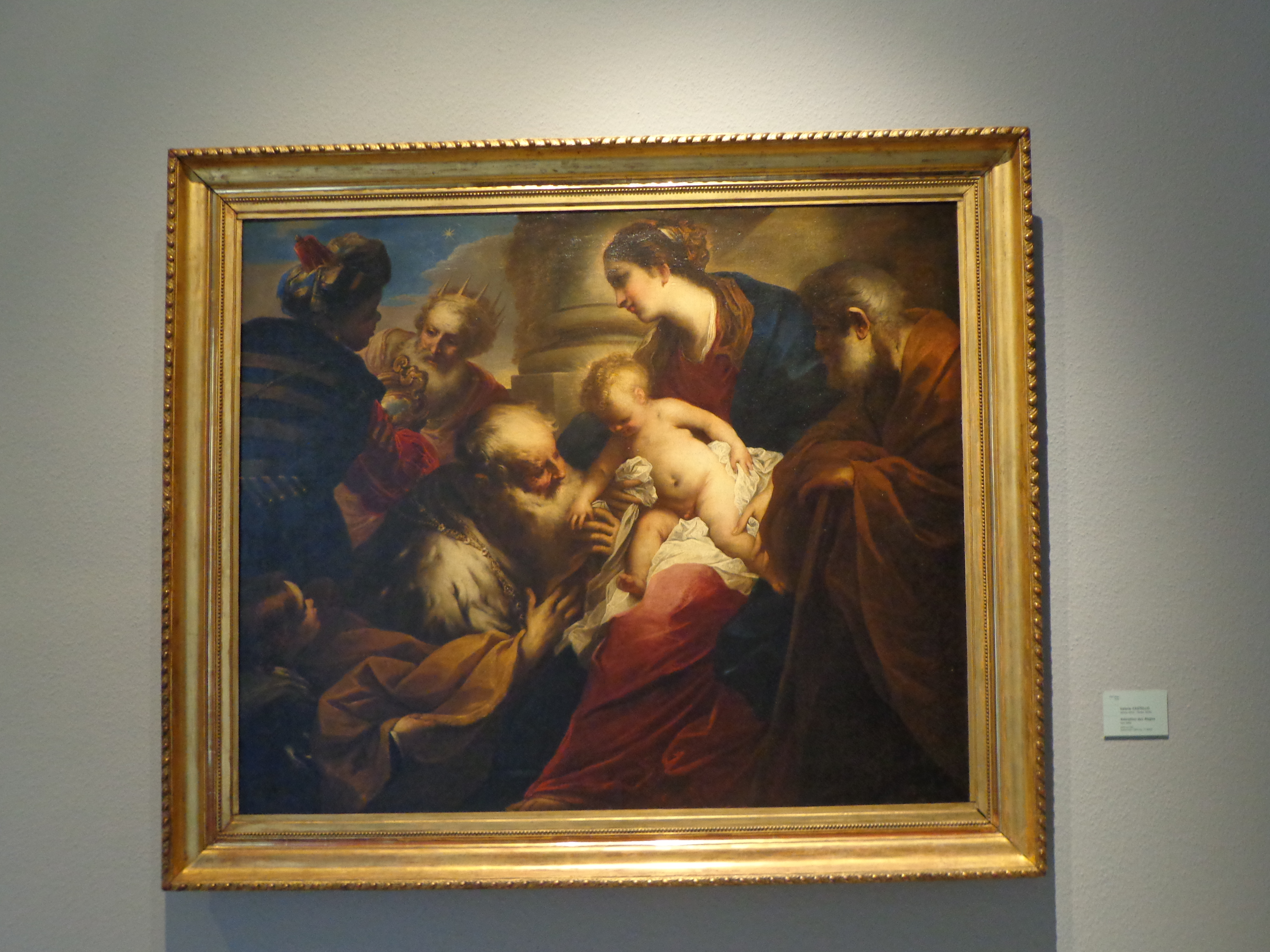
Adoration of the Magi, circa 1650 (MBA Strasbourg)

Valerio Castello (1624 – October 1659) born in Genoa, was an Italian painter of the Baroque period and one of the pre-eminent Ligurian painters of his time. His art drew inspiration from a wide range of sources. He painted on canvas and also in fresco.

== Life ==
He was the youngest son of Bernardo Castello, who died when Valerio was six years old. Valerio and his brothers were attached to the noble family of Torquato. While it had been the original intention for him to study a literary profession, he showed an affinity for drawing. This was noted by his patrons, who arranged his apprenticeship with Domenico Fiasella. Later, he studied with Giovanni Andrea de’ Ferrari. To seek new inspiration, he travelled to Milan and then to Parma, probably between 1640 and 1645. In Milan, he admired the work of Camillo Proccacini. From there, he traveled to Parma.

He excelled in painting battle scenes. He was also quite prolific within Genoa during his short life. He painted the Rape of the Sabines, now in the Palazzo Brignole Sale, Genoa, and decorated the cupola of the Basilica della Santissima Annunziata del Vastato in the same city. For the house of Francesco Maria Balbi, he collaborated with the quadraturista from Bologna, Andrea Sghizzi to fresco the palace.

In his works, he is regarded by his admirers as combining the fire of Tintoretto with the general style of Paolo Veronese. Castello influenced the work of young Domenico Piola. He also admired the work of Anthony van Dyck, who had spent a long time in Genoa and whose paintings could be seen all over the city. Among his pupils were Bartolomeo Biscaino, Giovanni Paolo Cervetto, and Stefano Magnasco (the father of Alessandro).

== Sources ==
- Camillo Manzitti, Valerio Castello, Turin, 2004. 2nd edition 2008.
- Camillo Manzitti, Valerio Castello, Genoa, 1972.
- Valerio Castello 1624-1659 Genio Moderno, Catalogue of the exhibition curated by Marzia Cataldi Gallo, Luca Leoncini, Camillo Manzitti, Daniele Sanguinetti, Ginevra-Milano, 2008.
- Raffaele Soprani, Le Vite de Pittori, Scoltori et Architetti Genovesi, Giuseppe Bottaro e Gio Battista Tiboldi Compagni, Genoa, 1674. Pagine 231–236.
- Raffaello Soprani, Vite de Pittori, Scultori ed Architetti Genovesi; Second edition, volume I: revised and expanded by Carlo Giuseppe Ratti, Stamperia Casamara, dalle Cinque Lampadi, con licenza de superiori, Genova, 1768. Pagine 339–350.
- Giuseppe Ginori, Serie degli uomini i più illustri nella pittura, scultura, e architettura..., 1773.
