= Biscayne (ethnonym) =

Demonym and ethnonym

Until the early 19th century the word Biscayne (= Biscayan) was a demonym and ethnonym referring somewhat ambiguously to the Basque Country (usually excluding Navarre), or more often the Basque people in general. For example, Saint Francis Xavier identified himself as a "Biscayne" — or vizcaino, as he wrote it – meaning a Basque from Vizcaya. Whaling crews from Labourd in the North Atlantic are also referred to as Biscaynes in the 16–18th century.

The word Biscayne left an imprint in different place names and surnames (last names) of the Americas and the Philippines, related to the Basque whale hunting and colonisation of the "New World". By the time of the 1833 territorial division of Spain, the concept had shifted gradually to mean anything related to the Basque province of Biscay in Spain.
