= Bartolomeo Biscaino =

Italian painter

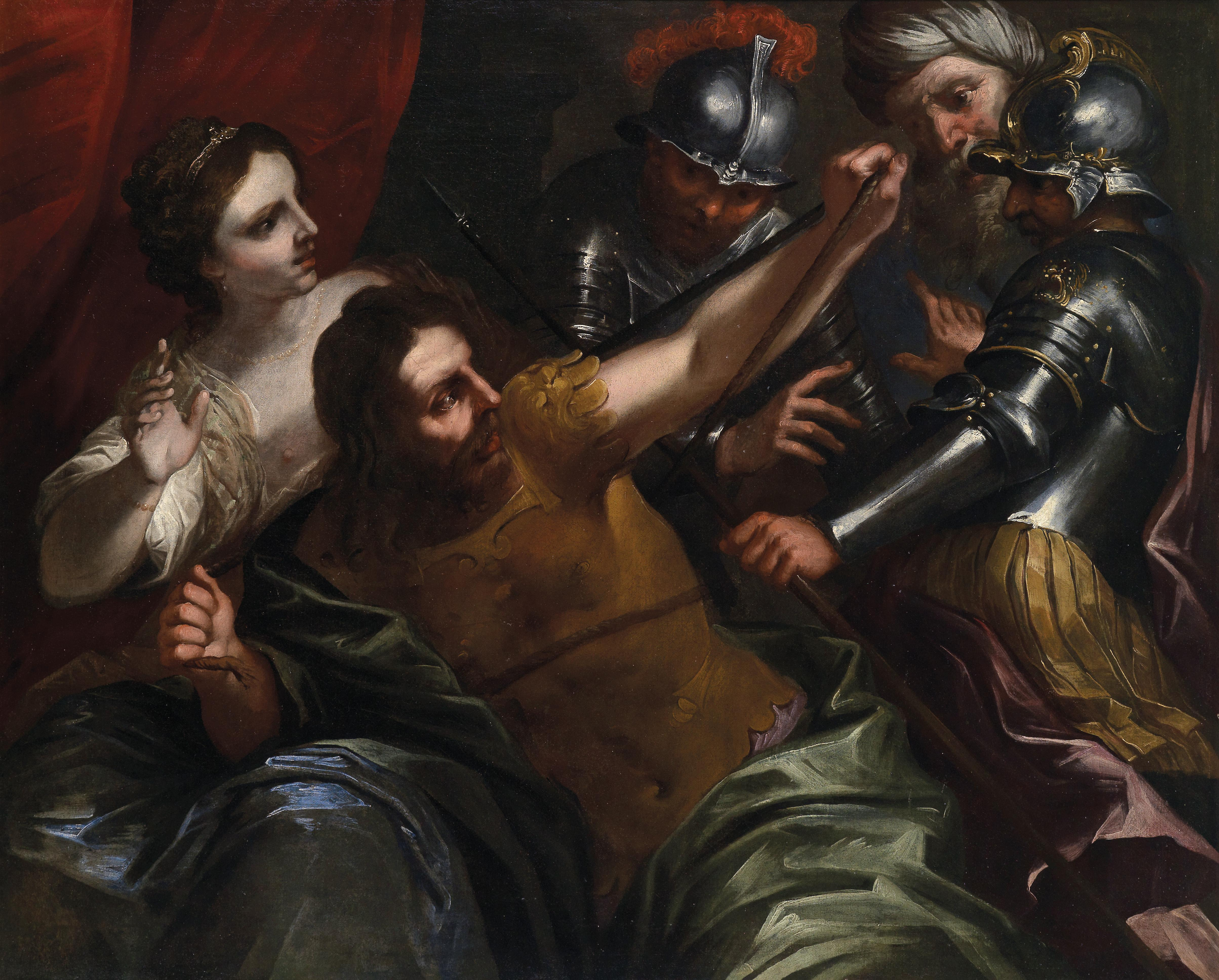
Samson and Delilah by Bartolomeo Biscaino, 1657

Bartolomeo Biscaino (1632–1657) was an Italian painter of the Baroque period, active in his native Genoa.

== Life ==
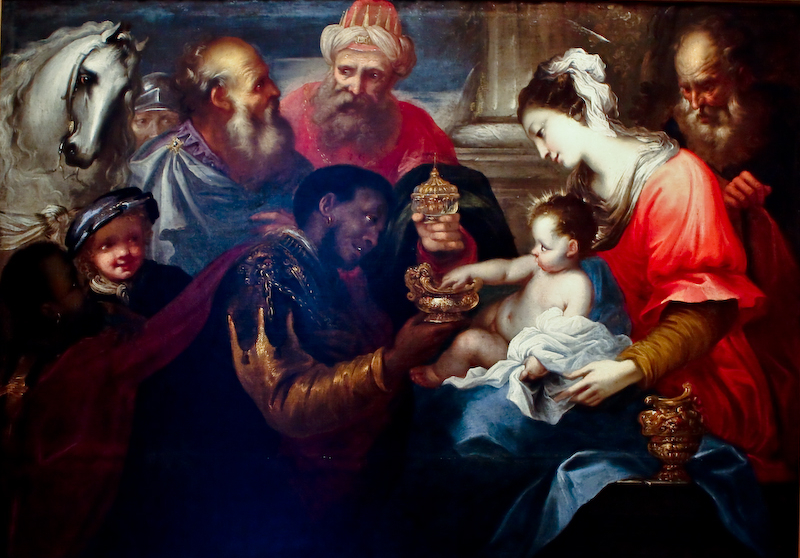
Adoration of the Magi, 1650s (Musée des Beaux-Arts de Strasbourg)

He was the son, and pupil, of Giovanni Andrea Biscaino. He afterwards became a pupil of Valerio Castello. His career was cut short by the plague which visited Genoa, and to which he and his father fell victim. The Dresden gallery once held three paintings, representing Woman taken in adultery, Adoration by Magi, and Circumcision of Christ.

Around 1650 Biscaino entered the workshop of Valerio Castello, and from roughly that year his first known work, which still finds him a clumsy and immature artist, was the canvas representing St Ferrando in the act of imploring the Virgin. Almost at the same time Biscaino worked on the canvases representing the Alms of St Louis King of France and Death of Cleopatra, both preserved in the Palazzo Bianco gallery in Genoa. In these canvases, the colors were not very vibrant, but the painter achieved a greater compositional balance, even if he did not get to possess a personal style, since he did not yet show the later influence of Rubens and Pellegro Piola. On the other hand, the existing canvas in the Pinacoteca Civica of Savona, representing Triumph of David and in Moses Saved from the Waters, he has more maturity.

Biscaino later follows Valerio Castello and in addition to the characteristic colors, which became smoky and sfatti he adopted the type of procacciniano-corrugated figure. This is also visible in his Adoration of the Magi, preserved in the National Gallery of Palazzo Spinola in Genoa. The last works of Biscaino, before his young death from plague, were the three paintings preserved in the Dresden Gallery and depicting Christ and the Adulteress, Presentation at the Temple and Adoration of the Magi. A sketch of the central part of the latter painting is preserved in M. Labò collection in Genoa and another in the National Gallery of Palazzo Spinola. In these works the painter could almost achieve a personal style.

== Works ==
He etched several plates, in a style, recalling Giovanni Benedetto Castiglione, including:

- Moses in bulrushes
- Susannah and the Elders
- Nativity with Angels
- The Circumcision
- The Magi's offering
- Herodias with head of St. John
- Virgin and infant with Angels
- Virgin suckling infant, with St Joseph
- Virgin suckling infant with St Joseph. St. John with his lamb
- Virgin adoring infant
- Virgin with infant Jesus on her knee, St. John kissing his foot and St Joseph behind
- Virgin with infant Jesus standing on her knee, stretching out his arm to St Joseph; half-length The Holy Family, with St John holding a cross
- Repose in Egypt with Angels
- Infant Jesus reposing on the globe
- St. Joseph with the Infant
- St. Christopher giving hand to Infant Jesus
- St. Christopher with Infant Jesus
- Mary Magdalene in desert (1656).
