= Adoration of the Magi (disambiguation) =

The Adoration of the Magi is a subject in Christian art.

Adoration of the Magi may also refer to:

- Adoration of the Magi (Andrea della Robbia)
- Adoration of the Magi (Artemisia Gentileschi)
- Adoration of the Magi (Biscaino)
- Adoration of the Magi (Bosch, Madrid)
- Adoration of the Magi (Bosch, New York)
- Adoration of the Magi (Bosch, Philadelphia)
- Adoration of the Magi (Botticelli, 1475)
- Adoration of the Magi (Castello)
- Adoration of the Magi (Cesare da Sesto)
- Adoration of the Magi (Correggio)
- Adoration of the Magi (Dürer)
- Adoration of the Magi (El Greco)
- Adoration of the Magi (Filippino Lippi)
- Adoration of the Magi (Fra Angelico and Filippo Lippi)
- Adoration of the Magi (Garofalo)
- Adoration of the Magi (Geertgen tot Sint Jans)
- Adoration of the Magi (Gentile da Fabriano)
- Adoration of the Magi (Gothic boxwood altarpiece), attributed to the workshop of Adam Dircksz.
- Adoration of the Magi (Jacob van Oostsanen)
- Adoration of the Magi (Leonardo)
- Adoration of the Magi (Lorenzo Monaco)
- Adoration of the Magi (Mantegna)
- Adoration of the Magi (Memling)
- Adoration of the Magi (Mostaert)
- Adoration of the Magi (Ospedale degli Innocenti)
- Adoration of the Magi (Parmigianino)
- Adoration of the Magi (Perugino, Città della Pieve)
- Adoration of the Magi (Perugino, Perugia)
- Adoration of the Magi (Perugino, Trevi)
- Adoration of the Magi (Pontormo)
- Adoration of the Magi (Rembrandt)
- Adoration of the Magi (Rubens, Antwerp)
- Adoration of the Magi (Rubens, Cambridge)
- Adoration of the Magi (Rubens, Lyon)
- Adoration of the Magi (Rubens, Madrid)
- Adoration of the Magi (Salomon Koninck)
- Adoration of the Magi (Sequeira)
- Adoration of the Magi (Signorelli)
- Adoration of the Magi (Stefano da Verona)
- Adoration of the Magi (Stom)
- Adoration of the Magi (tapestry) by Morris & Co.; see also Star of Bethlehem (painting)
- Adoration of the Magi (Velázquez)
- Adoration of the Magi (Veronese)
- Adoration of the Magi in a Winter Landscape by Pieter Bruegel the Elder
- Adoration of the Kings (Bramantino)
- Adoration of the Kings (Bruegel)
- Adoration of the Kings (Damaskinos)
- Adoration of the Kings (David, London)
- Adoration of the Kings (Gossaert)
- Dombild Altarpiece by Stefan Lochner
- Monforte Altarpiece by Hugo van der Goes
