= Katharina Pepijn =

Dutch artist (1619–1688)

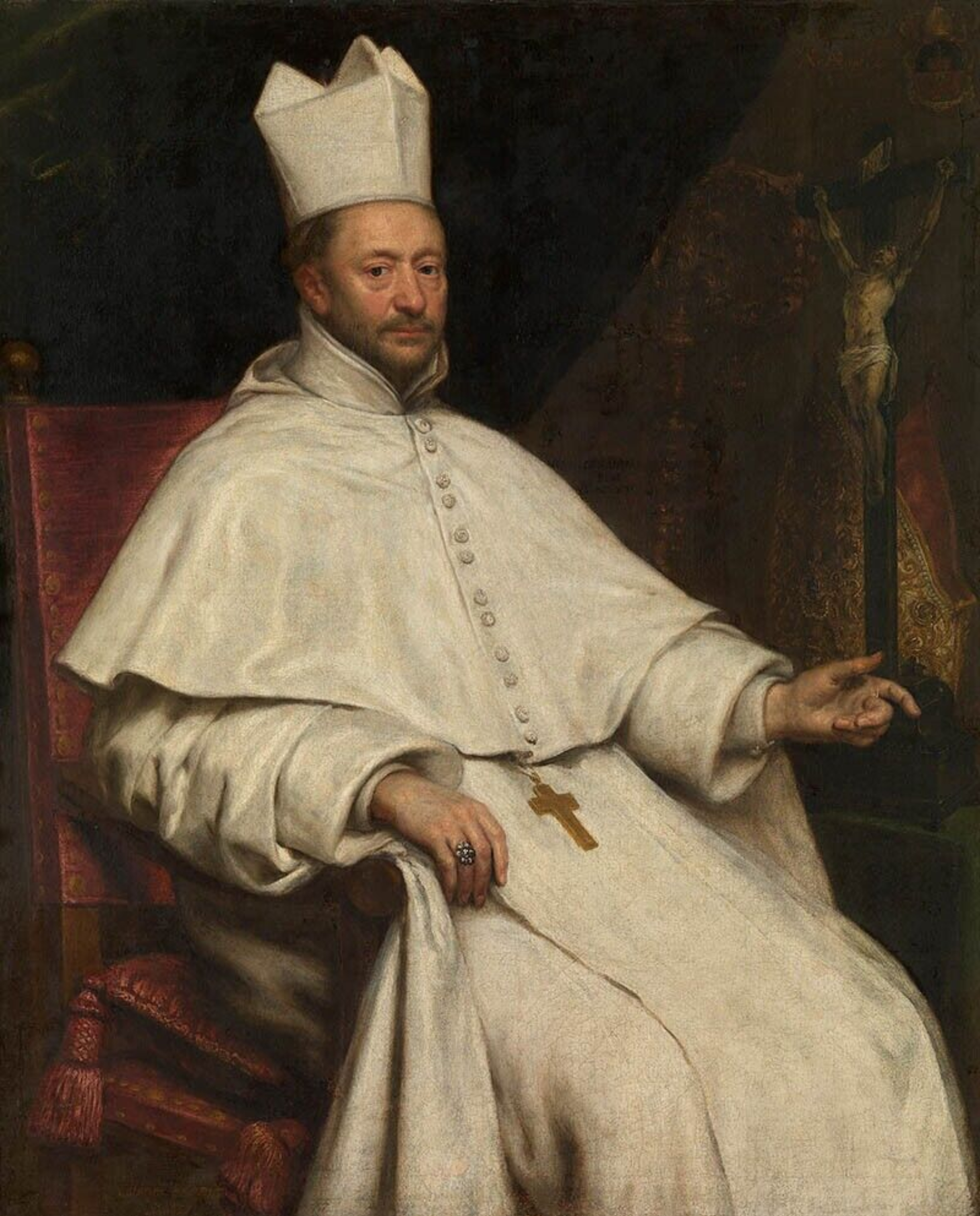
Portrait of Norbertus van Couwerven, Abbot of St Michael's

Katharina Pepijn or Catharina Pepijn (baptized on 13 February 1619, Antwerp - 12 November 1688, Antwerp) was a Flemish painter who was known for her history paintings and portraits.

== Life ==
Very little is known about the life or career of Katharina Pepijn. She was the daughter of Marten Pepijn and Marie Huybrechts. She likely trained with her father, a prominent painter in Antwerp. In 1654, she became a member of the Antwerp Guild of St. Luke as a 'wijnmeester', i.e. the daughter of a master.

At the end of her life, she was renting a house in a beguinage. She was taken ill and was cared for by a nurse. After she died, she was buried at Antwerp Cathedral.

== Work ==
Katharina Pepijn was known in her time as a history and portrait painter.

Currently, only two works are attributed to Katharina Pepijn. Both are portraits of abbots of St. Michael's Abbey, Antwerp, executed with oil on canvas in the 1650s. That of Abbot Johannes Chrysostomus vander Sterre was made shortly after his death in 1652. The other is of Abbot Norbertus van Couwerven. Both paintings were originally kept at St. Michael's Abbey. Her portraits are in the style of Rubens and van Dyck.
