= Tytgat =

Antwerper family

Tytgat (Tijdgat, Tijdgaat, Tcytgats, Tijtgast, Tydtgat, Tempus Dei) is a patrician family from Antwerp. The surname is among the oldest in Antwerp.

== History ==
The genealogy begins with St. Michael's Abbey, Antwerp, which was founded in 1124. In 1146, the Bishop of Cambrai confirmed the abbey to be in possession of certain property. It was then common among Frankish communities that a union was secured by living witnesses. The name of the witnesses was written down under which they were best known to the community. The witnesses for the abbey's possession of some property in 1146 included schepens of Antwerp, including Raduardus Tempus Dei, the ancestor of the Tytgat family.
