= Kedleston Madonna =

Painting by Parmigianino

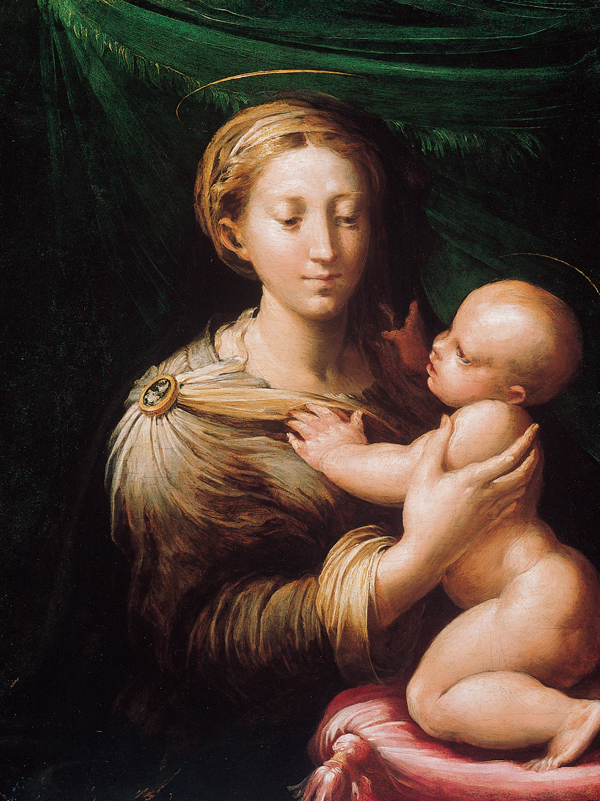
Kedleston Madonna (c. 1529) by Parmigianino

The Kedleston Madonna is an oil on canvas painting by Parmigianino, from c. 1529. It is held in the Kimbell Art Museum, in Fort Worth, Texas, which acquired it from the Kedleston collection in the United Kingdom in 1995.

== History ==
Stylistic and compositional features of the work date it to the artist's period in Bologna between 1527 and 1530 - the Christ Child's pose is reminiscent of that in his 1530 Santa Margherita Madonna, for example. This agrees with Vasari's Lives of the Artists, which states that in this period Parmigianino ""scattered around Bologna other Madonnas and small coloured and ornate paintings".

It was acquired from Marchese Arnaldi in Florence by William Kent for Nathaniel Curzon, 5th Baronet in 1758 and hung at the Curzon residence of Kedleston Hall, after which it is named. It passed through the Curzon family until being transferred to the trustees of the Kedleston Estate Trusts in 1987, who in turn sold it to its present owners in 1995. It was first attributed to Parmigianino in 1992 by Cecil Gould, an attribution accepted by all subsequent art historians.
