= Adoration of the Shepherds (Signorelli) =

Painting by Luca Signorelli

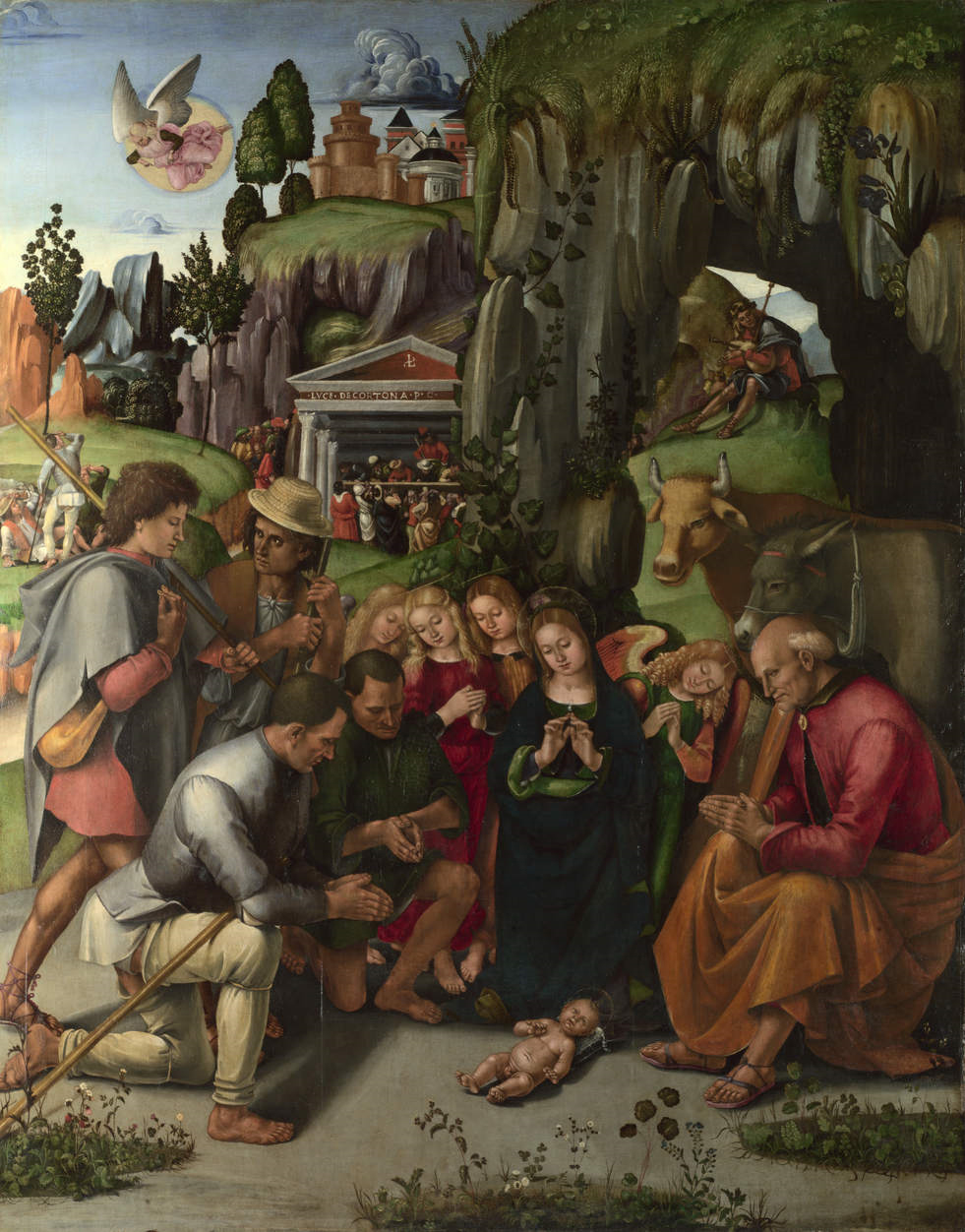
Adoration of the Shepherds (1496) by Luca Signorelli

Adoration of the Shepherds is a 1496 oil painting by Luca Signorelli, originally painted on panel but later transferred to canvas. It was probably the second painting the artist produced in Città di Castello after Adoration of the Magi. Originally in the church of San Francesco in the town, it went on the art market after that church was secularised. After several owners it was acquired by the National Gallery, London in 1882, where it still hangs.
