= Macarius Simeomo =

44th abbot of Saint Michael's Abbey, Antwerp

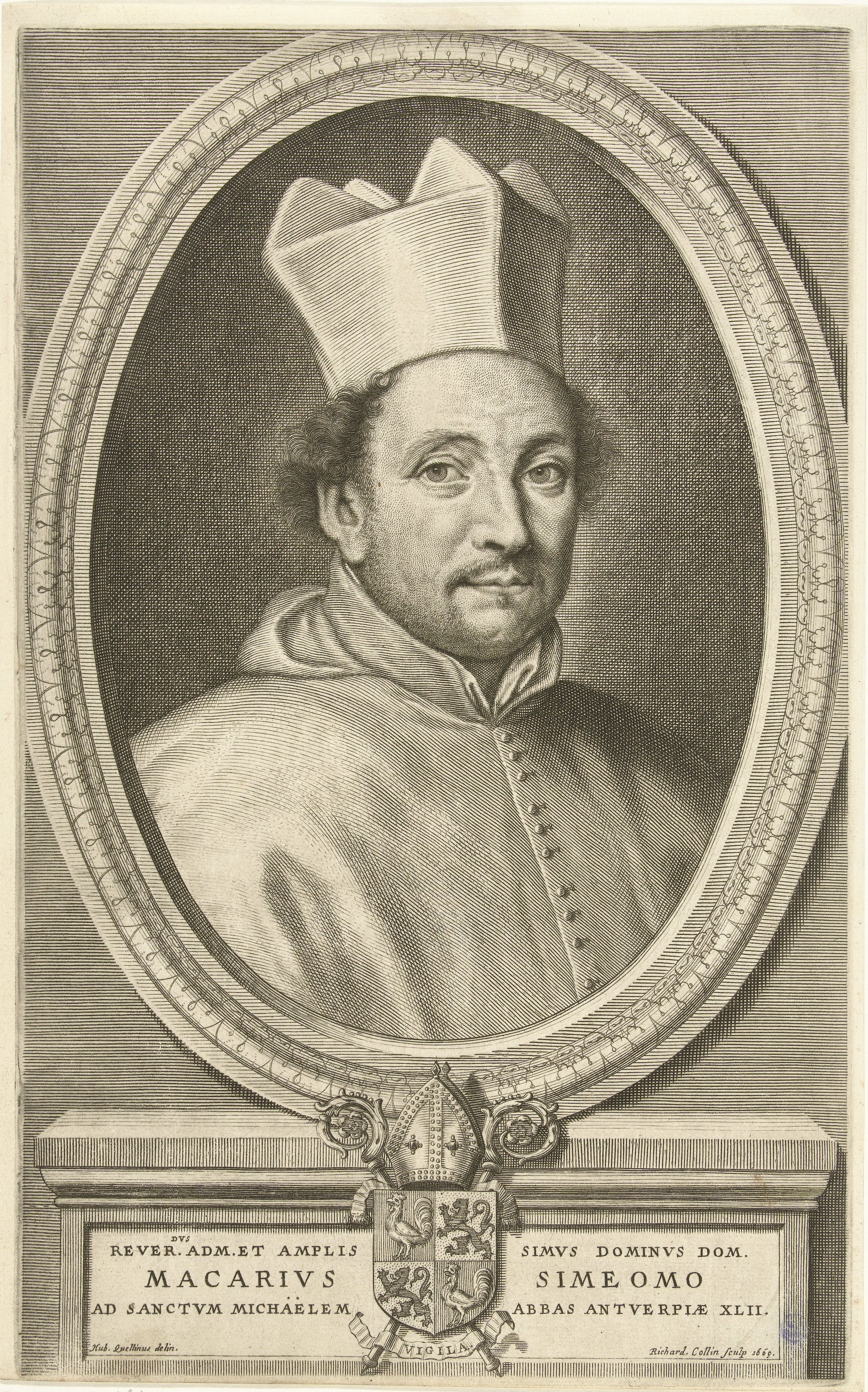
Portrait engraved by Richard Collin after a design by Hubertus Quellinus (1669)

Macarius Simeomo or Simeomus, born Jean-Baptiste (1616–1676) was the 44th abbot of St. Michael's Abbey, Antwerp.

== Life ==
Jean-Baptiste Simeomo was born in Antwerp in 1616 to Marc-Aurelio Simeomo and Sara de la Chambre and was baptised in Antwerp Cathedral on 13 May of that year. His father was an Italian merchant in the city. He was educated at the Jesuit college in Antwerp and on 2 February 1634 was professed at St Michael's Abbey, taking the religious name Macarius. He studied philosophy and theology, spending three years at the Premonstratensian College, Leuven. He was ordained to the priesthood in 1640 and graduated with a Licentiate of Sacred Theology from Leuven University in 1645.

In 1652, Simeomo preached the funeral sermon for Abbot Johannes Chrysostomus vander Sterre. After the death of Abbot Norbert van Couwerven in 1661, he was elected his successor, but was not enthroned as abbot until 8 April 1663. In 1666, he served as visitor and vicar general of the Premonstratensian Order in Germany and Bohemia. He was also a member of the First Estate of the States of Brabant. He had a house built in Brussels, where he and his successors could stay when on business in the city. He provided the Bollandists with documentation and received the dedication of the last volumes of March (1667) and April (1675).

He died in Antwerp on 12 April 1676.

== Writings ==
Most of Simeomo's writings remain in manuscript. Those published include:

- Theses theologicae de peccatis (Antwerp, 1646-1647)
- Laudatio funebris in exequiis reverendissimi domini D. Ioannis Chrysostomi Vander Sterre (Antwerp, 1652)
- Chorographia Sacra Coenobii S. Michaelis Antverpia (Brussels, 1660)

Catholic Church titles
Preceded by Norbert van Couwerven	Abbot of St. Michael's Abbey, Antwerp; 1661–1676	Succeeded by Hermannus vander Poorten
