= Joannes Chrysostomus Teniers =

17th-century Catholic abbot and poet

The High Reverend Lord Joannes Chrysostomus Teniers O.Praem.
- abbas S. Michaelis Antwerpiensis
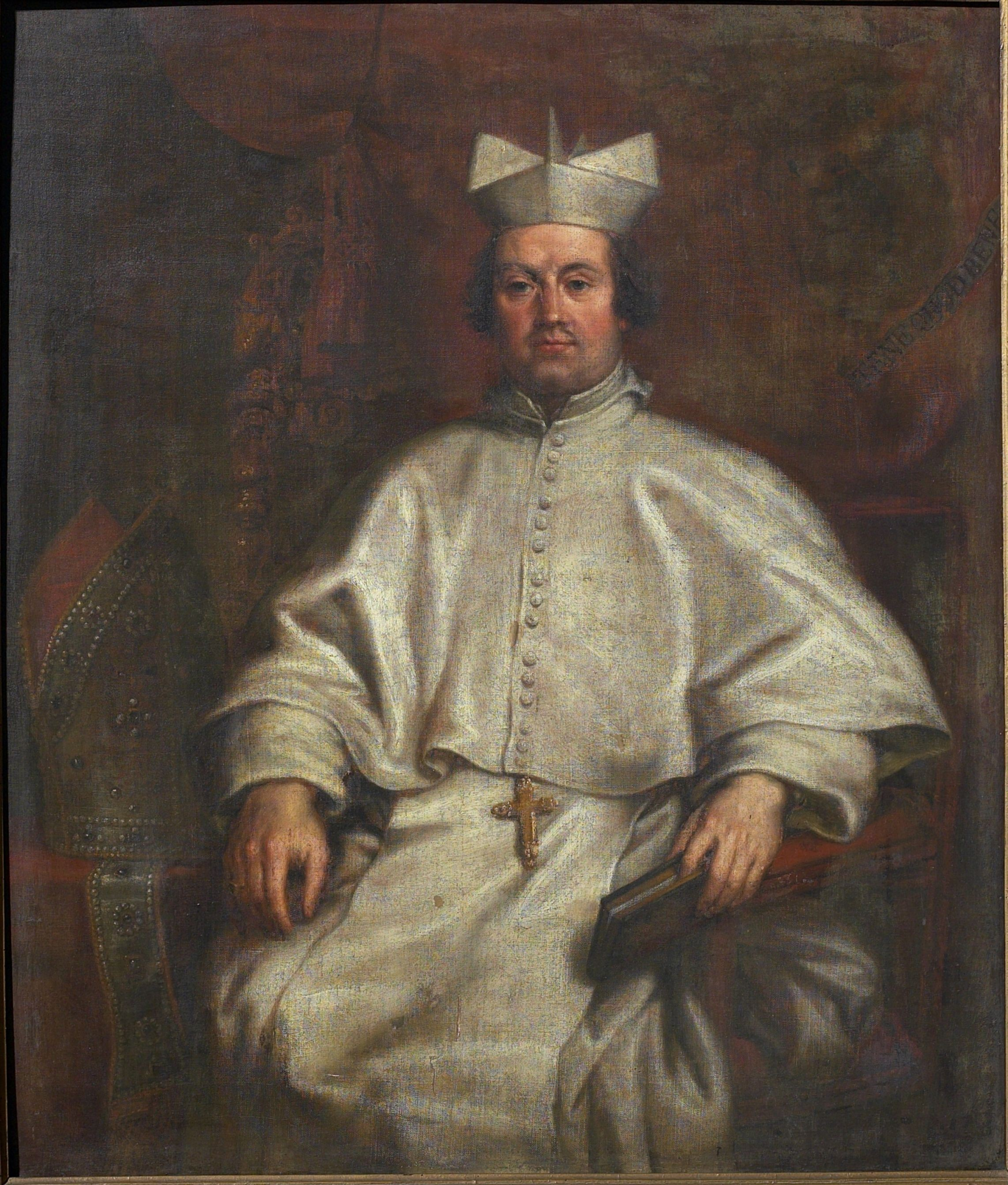
- Portrait by Jan Erasmus Quellinus
- Church: Roman Catholic
- Appointed: 19 May 1687
- Predecessor: Gerardus Knyff
- Successor: Joannes Baptiste Vermoelen
- Other posts: Lord of Berendrecht and Sandvliet

Orders
- Ordination: 13 March 1677

Personal details
- Born: Joannes Jacobus Teniers; 1653 Antwerp, Duchy of Brabant, Spanish Netherlands
- Died: 30 November 1709 (aged 55–56) Antwerpen
- Motto: Tene Quod Bene
- Coat of arms

Joannes Chrysostomus Teniers, the religious name of Joannes Jacobus Teniers (also known as Jan Jacob or Jean-Jacques Teniers;1653–1709) was a Flemish preacher and poet. He served as the abbot of the St. Michael's Abbey in Antwerp and in that role, was also the Lord of Berendrecht and Santvliet.

== Life ==
Joannes Chrysostomus Teniers was born in Antwerp, the son of Melchior Teniers and Maria de Backer. He was baptised there on 28 January 1653 with the birth name Joannes Jacobus Teniers.

After studying the Liberal Arts at Leuven University Teniers entered St Michael's Abbey, Antwerp, a house of the Premonstratensian Order. He was professed on 17 January 1675, ordained 13 March 1677, and elected abbot 19 May 1687. As abbot he took the motto Tene Quod Bene ("Hold on to what is good", 1 Thessalonians 5, verse 21).

Teniers died in Antwerp on 30 November 1709. His portrait painted by Jan Erasmus Quellinus is in the collection of Tongerlo Abbey.

== Writings ==
Teniers had a reputation as a preacher, and a manuscript of his sermons for feastdays was preserved in the monastery library, as well as two volumes of his notes on the works of St Augustine.

One of Teniers' poems was published in the preliminary matter of Jacobus Moons's Sedelyck Vreughde-Perck (Antwerp, Michiel Knobbaert, 1685).
