= Adoration of the Magi (Rubens) =

Peter Paul Rubens painted the Adoration of the Magi (Matthew 2:1ff) more often than any other episode from the life of Christ. The subject offered the Counter-Reformation artist the chance to depict the richest worldly panoply, rich textiles, exotic turbans and other incidents, with a range of human types caught up in a dramatic action that expressed the humbling of the world before the Church, embodied in Madonna and child. The most notable include:

- Adoration of the Magi (Rubens, Madrid), 1609, reworked 1628–29
- Adoration of the Magi (Rubens, Lyon), c.1617–18
- Adoration of the Magi (Rubens, Antwerp), 1624
- Adoration of the Magi (Rubens, Cambridge), c.1634
