= Marten Pepijn =

Flemish painter (1575–1643)

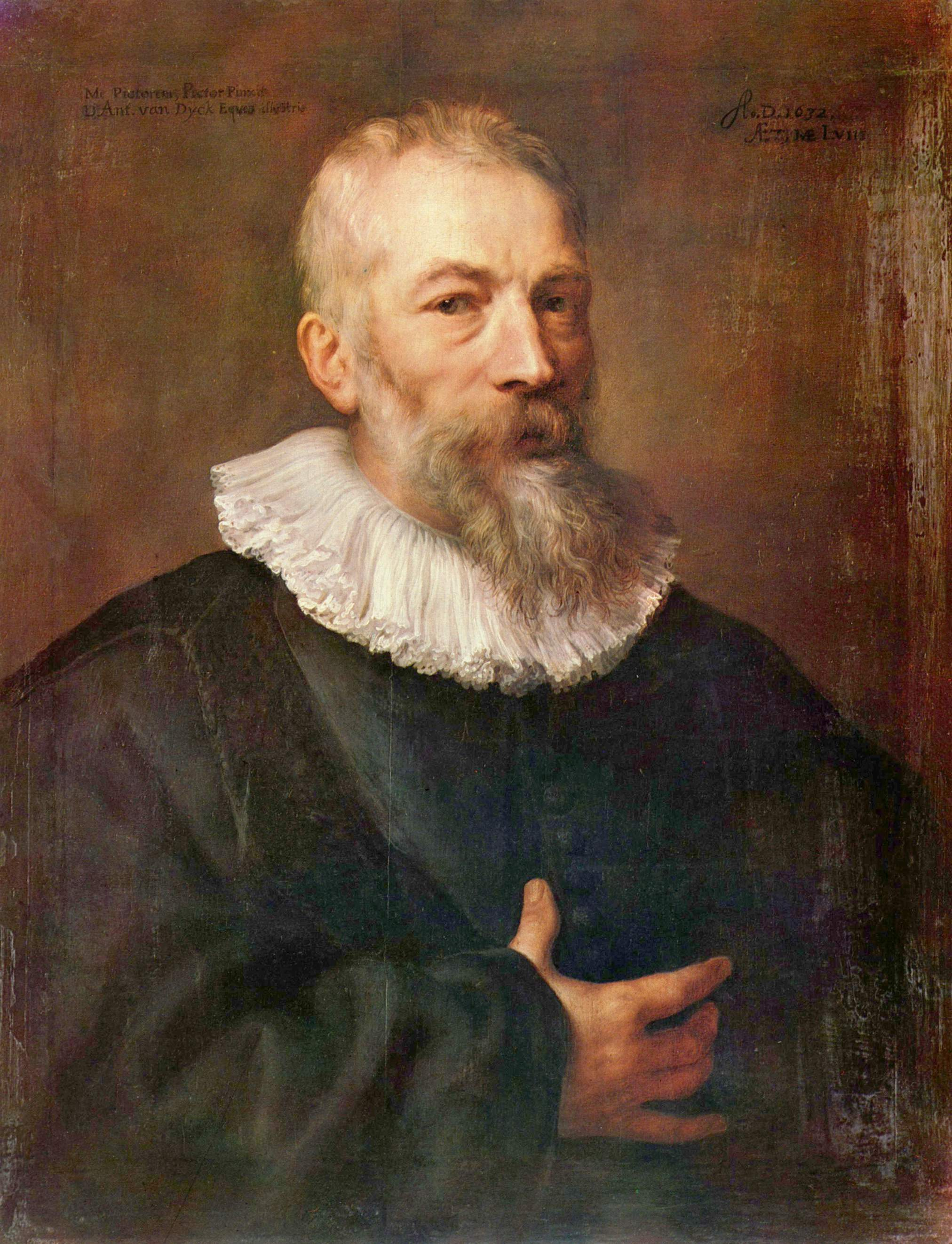
Portrait of Marten Pepijn by Anthony van Dyck

Marten Pepijn (21 February 1575 – 1643) was a Flemish painter who was mainly known for his large-scale history paintings and to a lesser extent for his smaller genre scenes.

== Life ==
Marten Pepijn was born in Antwerp as the son of WIllem Pepijn and Catharina van den Berg. His father was a buyer of used clothes and art dealer in Antwerp. It is not clear with whom Marten trained. In 1600 he was admitted as a master in the Antwerp Guild of Saint Luke as a 'wijnmeester', i.e. the son of a member. The 17th-century Flemish biographer Cornelis de Bie reported in his 1662 Het Gulden Cabinet that Pepijn visited Italy but there is no evidence of such trip.

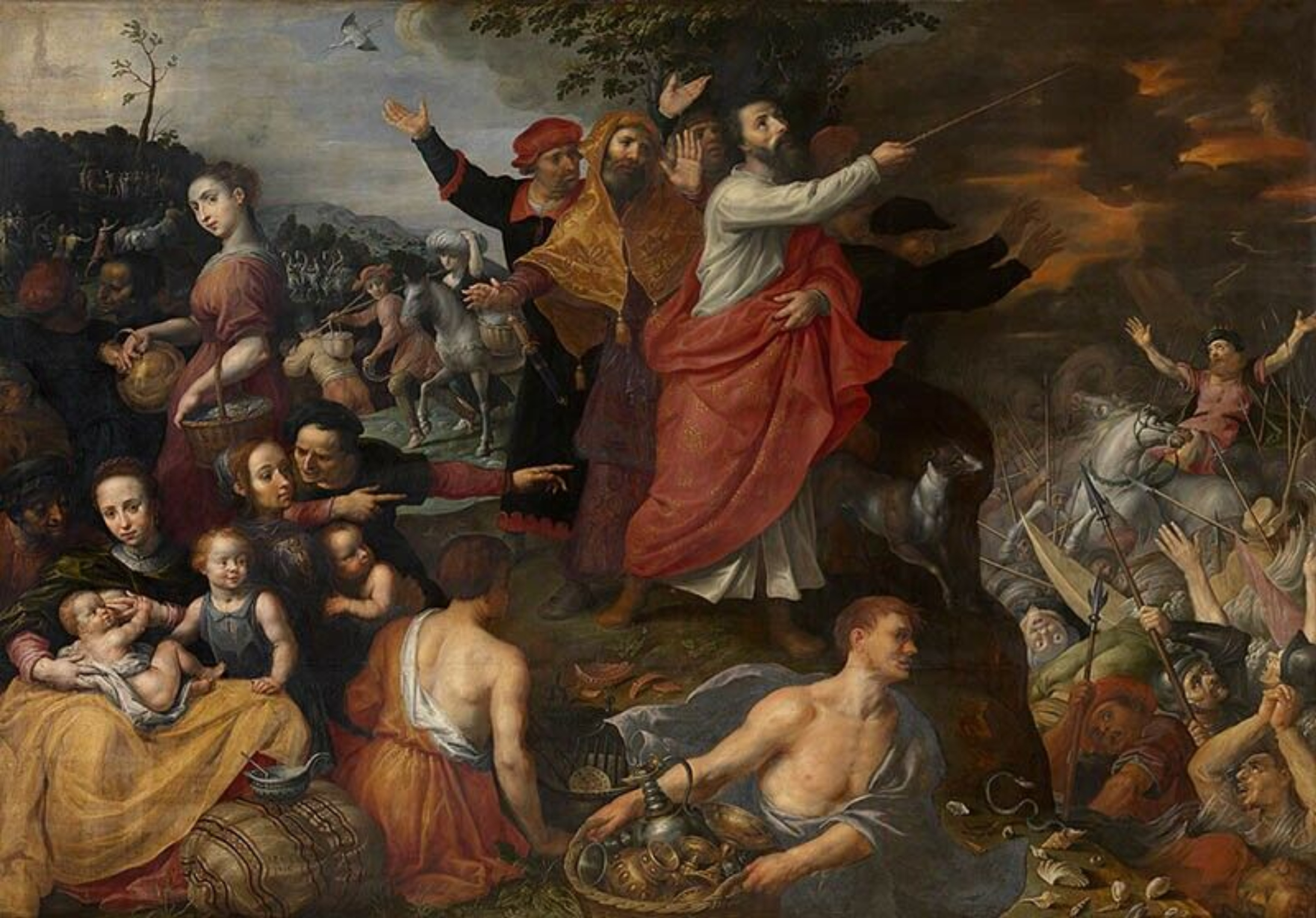
Crossing of the Red Sea

He married on 1 December 1601 with Marie Huybrechts (her death debt was paid between 1647 and 1648) with whom he had five children: Willem, Adriaan, Marten, Martha and Katharina. His daughter Katharina (1619–1668) became a notable portrait painter in the style of Rubens and van Dyck. A son also became a painter but nothing his known about his work.

Although Cornelis de Bie and the early Dutch artist biographer Arnold Houbraken wrote that there was rivalry between Pepijn and Rubens, this is unlikely since Isabella Brant, Rubens' first wife, was the godmother of his eldest daughter Martha. The artist also had a close relationship with Anthony van Dyck who painted his portrait. This painting ended up in the 19th century in the collection of the Dutch king William II.

Between 1602 and 1628 Maarten Pepijn took on eight apprentices. In addition to his own children, his pupils were Hans Caes, Claes Fopsen, Hans Bosken (all 1602), Matthieu Matthiesen (1613), Matthys Goossens (1620/21), François Lemmens (1620/21), Joris Sebil (1620/21) and François van Boost (1625/26 ).

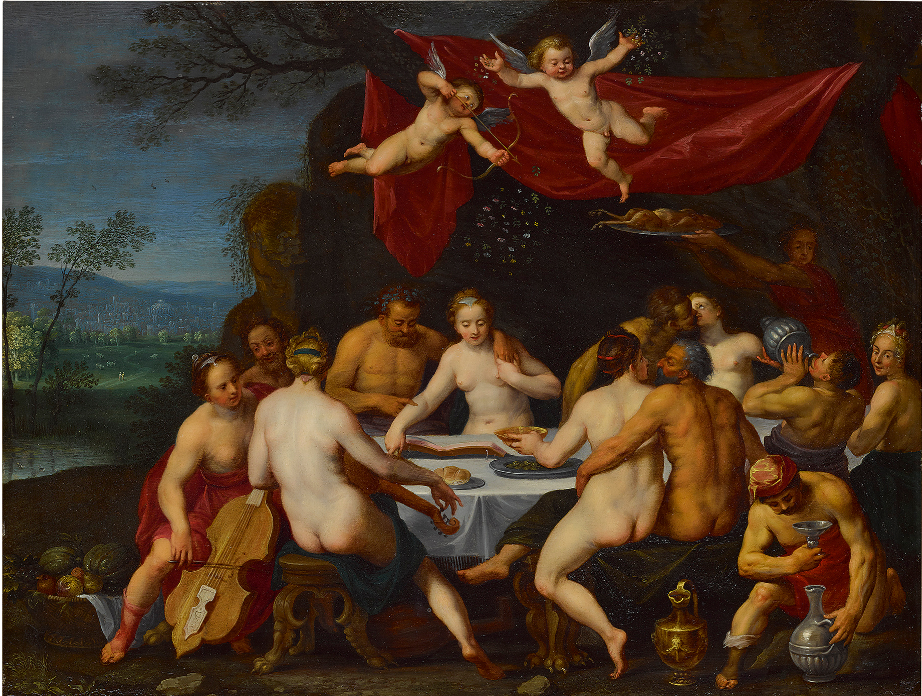
The wedding feast of Bacchus and Ariadne

Marten Pepijn suffered of ill health at the end of his life and died in Antwerp in 1643.

== Work ==
=== History painting ===
Marten Pepijn was mainly known for his large religious compositions, and in particular, altarpieces. His style in these works is old-fashioned. The figures are generally depicted in stiff poses reminiscent of 16th-century sculpture. His work shows a distinctive influence by Ambrosius Francken the Elder, and as a result some of Francken's works have been attributed to Pepijn. This is for instance the case with the grisaille Saints John and Matthew of 1602, which is the exterior of the right wing of a triptych painted by multiple Antwerp masters for the Guild of St Luke in Antwerp (Royal Museum of Fine Arts, Antwerp). This wing is now attributed to Ambrosius Francken the Elder by the Netherlands Institute for Art History.

Pepijn's work is further characterized by its excellent portraiture. This is demonstrated in the composition Saint Bernard and the Duke of Aquitaine (Musée des beaux-arts de Valenciennes).

=== Genre paintings ===
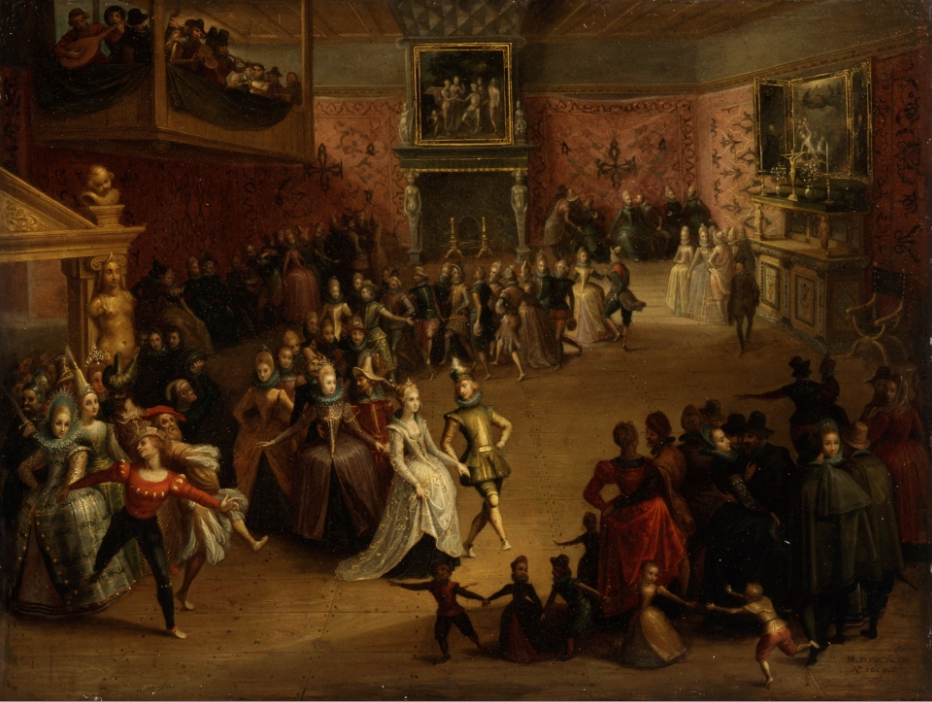
Ball at the court

There is still uncertainty as to whether a number of cabinet pictures that depict genre scenes, in particular of ball scenes at court, that are now attributed to Marten Pepijn are in fact by his hand. Some of these pictures bearing a monogram show a style, which is completely different from the large-scale, muscular religious works of Pepijn. These works are believed to have been produced in a period when Pepijn had close contact with the leading Antwerp painter Frans Francken the Younger.

These small-scale compositions contain little figures with stereotyped faces and soft contours. This style is found in his allegories of the Five Senses (private collection), The ball and the Ball at the court (both in the Pushkin Museum, Moscow). This last composition is signed and dated 1604 and depicts an elegant dance party. The influence of early works by Hieronymus Francken the Elder and Frans Francken the Younger, who were both known for their depictions of similar scenes, is apparent.

The difference between the styles of these smaller compositions and his larger, religious works has yet to be satisfactorily explained. Some historians have suggested that possibly the smaller works are the work of a family member such as a son or brother of Pepijn.
