= Norbertus van Couwerven =

Belgian abbot

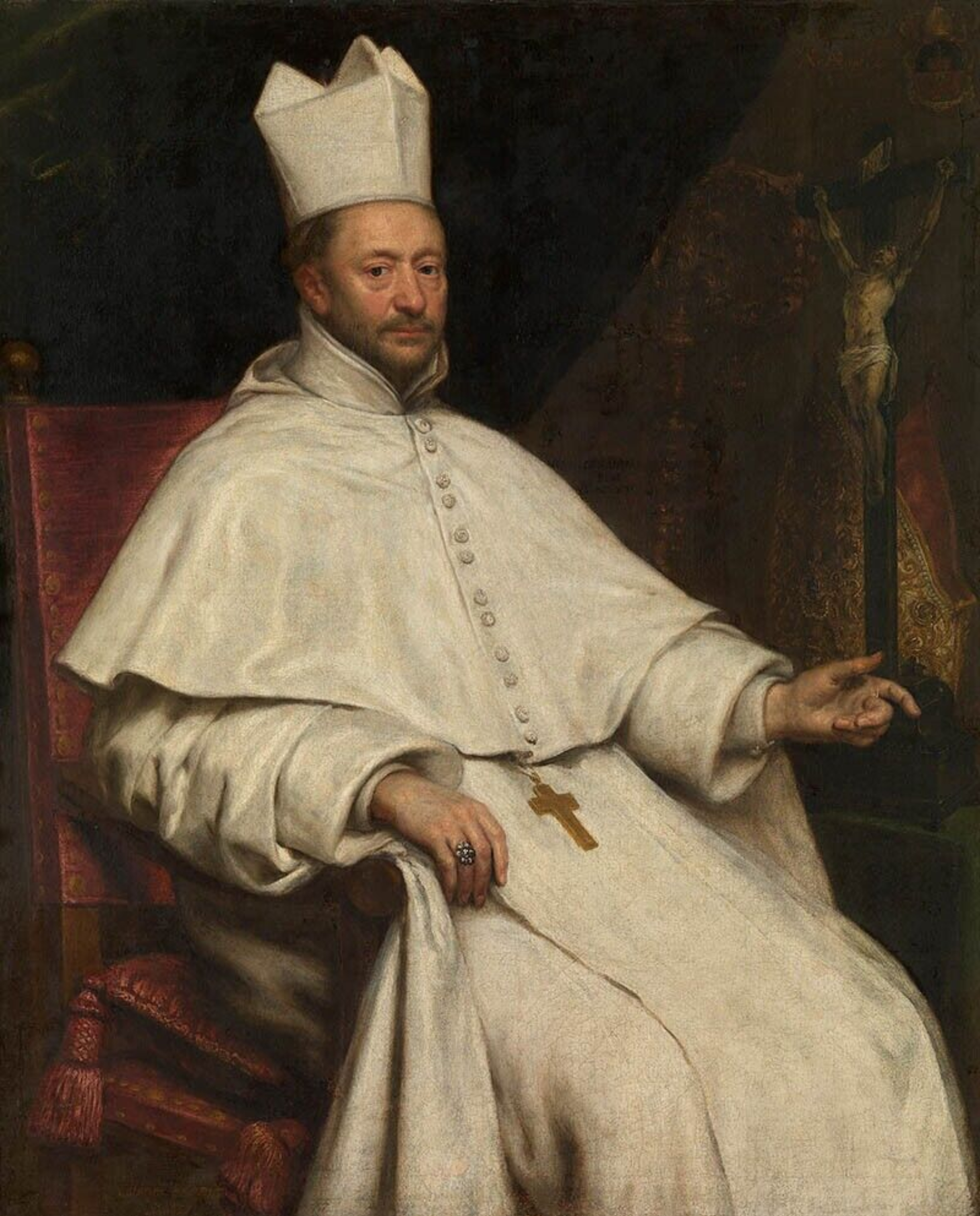
Portrait by Katharina Pepijn (1657)

Norbertus van Couwerven (died 9 September 1661) was the 43rd abbot of St. Michael's Abbey, Antwerp.

== Life ==
Van Couwerven was born in Antwerp towards the end of the 16th century. After completing his education at the Jesuit college in Antwerp, he entered the Premonstratensian order and was sent to study at Leuven University. After graduation and ordination, he became a noted preacher in Antwerp, where in 1652 he was named abbot of St Michael's in succession to Johannes Chrysostomus vander Sterre.

In 1654, he had a silver reliquary made for relics of St Norbert that had come into the abbey's possession, and in 1655 he commissioned a replacement for the abbey's great bell, and had a new 31-bell carillon cast for the abbey church. On 31 July 1656, he preached a sermon in honour of Jesuit founder Ignatius of Loyola.

According to his epitaph, he died on 9 September 1661. He was buried at the foot of the main altar in the abbey church.

== Writings ==
- Observationes in universum stagyriticam philosophiam
- Velitationes nonnullae Theologicae
- Concionimi Tomi tres (a collection of sermons)
- Sermoonen ter eeren van den h. Ignatius, fondateur van de Societeyt Jesu, ghepredickt in de kercke van het professie huys tot Antwerpen op den XXXI Julii M.D.C.LVI. (Antwerp, Balthasar Moretus, 1656)

Catholic Church titles
Preceded by Johannes Chrysostomus vander Sterre	Abbot of St. Michael's Abbey, Antwerp; 1652–1661	Succeeded by Macarius Simeomo
