= Adoration of the Magi (Rubens, Madrid) =

Painting by Peter Paul Rubens

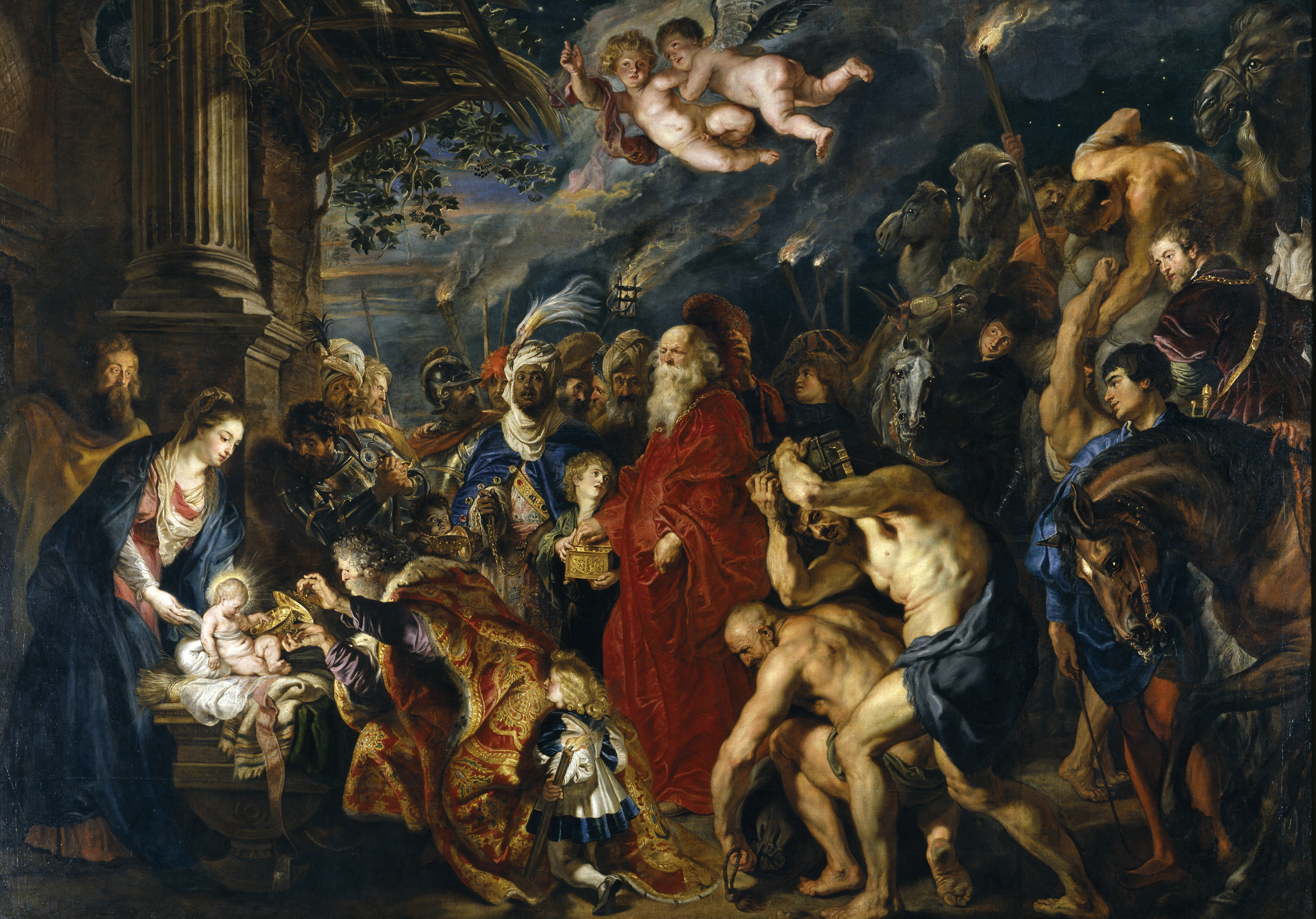
Adoration of the Magi (1609-1629) by Rubens (355.5 cm (11.6 ft) x 493 cm (16.1 ft)

The Adoration of the Magi is a very large oil painting by the Flemish Baroque painter Peter Paul Rubens. He first painted it in 1609 and later gave it a major reworking between 1628 and 1629 during his second trip to Spain. It is now in the Museo del Prado in Madrid.

It is one of many works on the subject by Rubens - others include those of 1616–17 and 1624.

== History ==
Towards the end of 1608 Antwerp was preparing to receive the peace delegates negotiating an end to the war between Spain and the Dutch Republic. Their negotiations were to be held in Antwerp City Hall between 28 March and 9 April 1609 and resulted in the Twelve Years' Truce. Hopes were high for the talks and for the renewed economic prosperity that peace or a truce would bring - Antwerp was a major commercial centre and it was in crisis due to the Dutch blockade of the city. The city council decided in early 1609 to commission a painting for the Statenkamer, in which the negotiations would be held, and to choose Rubens for the commission, due to his first-hand experience of Italian art. He had returned to Antwerp and was already the city's most notable painter. He was paid 1,800 florins for the commission.

The theme of the commission was an allusion to the benefits the city hoped to gain from peace. There is a sketch for the work in Groninger Museum in Groningen, as well as several preparatory studies, including Head of a black Magus (private collection, London), a Portrait of a bearded man (Galleria Nazionale d'Arte Antica, Palazzo Corsini alla Lungara, Rome) and others in the Museum Boymans Van Beuningen in Rotterdam. There is also a study for the whole work in a private collection in London, which allows its original appearance to be reconstructed.

In spring 1612 Rodrigo Calderón, a confidant of the duque de Lerma, came to the Spanish Netherlands as an extraordinary ambassador of the king of Spain, presumably with the task of converting the truce into a permanent peace treaty. The town magistrates presented the painting to Calderón, but in 1621 he fell into disgrace and was executed. In 1623 Philip IV of Spain purchased the painting from the sale of Calderón's collection and installed it in his Royal Alcázar of Madrid.

In September 1628 Rubens travelled to Spain for the second time, leaving on 29 September 1629. He had been summoned there to inform the king about his peace negotiations with Britain, but was also able to rework the painting while he was there. Francisco Pacheco relates in his work El arte de la pintura "[Rubens] changed some things in his painting of the Adoration of the Magi that was in the palace". This amounted to a complete re-working, with several details modified, strips added to the top and right hand edges (its original dimensions were 259 cm by 381 cm) and the style updated to that of the late 1620s, heavily influenced by Titian.

The painting became very popular within the Spanish royal collection and when Maria Anna of Neuburg suggested sending it to Germany as a gift to her father Philip William, Elector Palatine, she was vetoed by her husband Charles II of Spain. It had to be cut from its frame with a knife, rolled up and thrown out of a window during a fire at the Royal Alcazar of Madrid in 1734 - the cuts and small blisters in the paint (caused by exposure to the heat of the fire) are still visible, though it was otherwise undamaged. It was later installed in the Royal Palace of Madrid, built on the same site, and he then went to the Museo del Prado, in whose inventories it first appears in 1834. In 2004, the painting underwent a complete restoration.

== See also ==
- Adoration of the Magi (Rubens), for other treatments of the subject

== Bibliography ==
- Díaz Padrón, Matías (1995). El Siglo de Rubens en el Museo del Prado. Catálogo Razonado de Pintura Flamenca del Siglo XVII. Tomo II. Barcelona. Madrid: Editorial Prensa Ibérica, S. A. / Museo Nacional del Prado. ISBN 84-87657-89-3.
- Museo del Prado: Catálogo de las pinturas. Madrid: Ministerio de Educación y Cultura. pp. 327 – 328. ISBN 84-87317-53-7.
- Vergara, Alejandro, Rubens. The Adoration of the Magi, Madrid, Museo del Prado and Paul Holberton Publishing, 2004.
