= Matthæus Yrsselius =

Abbot in Antwerp from 1614 to 1629

The High Reverend Lord Matthæus Yrsselius O.Praem.
- abbas S. Michaelis Antwerpiensis
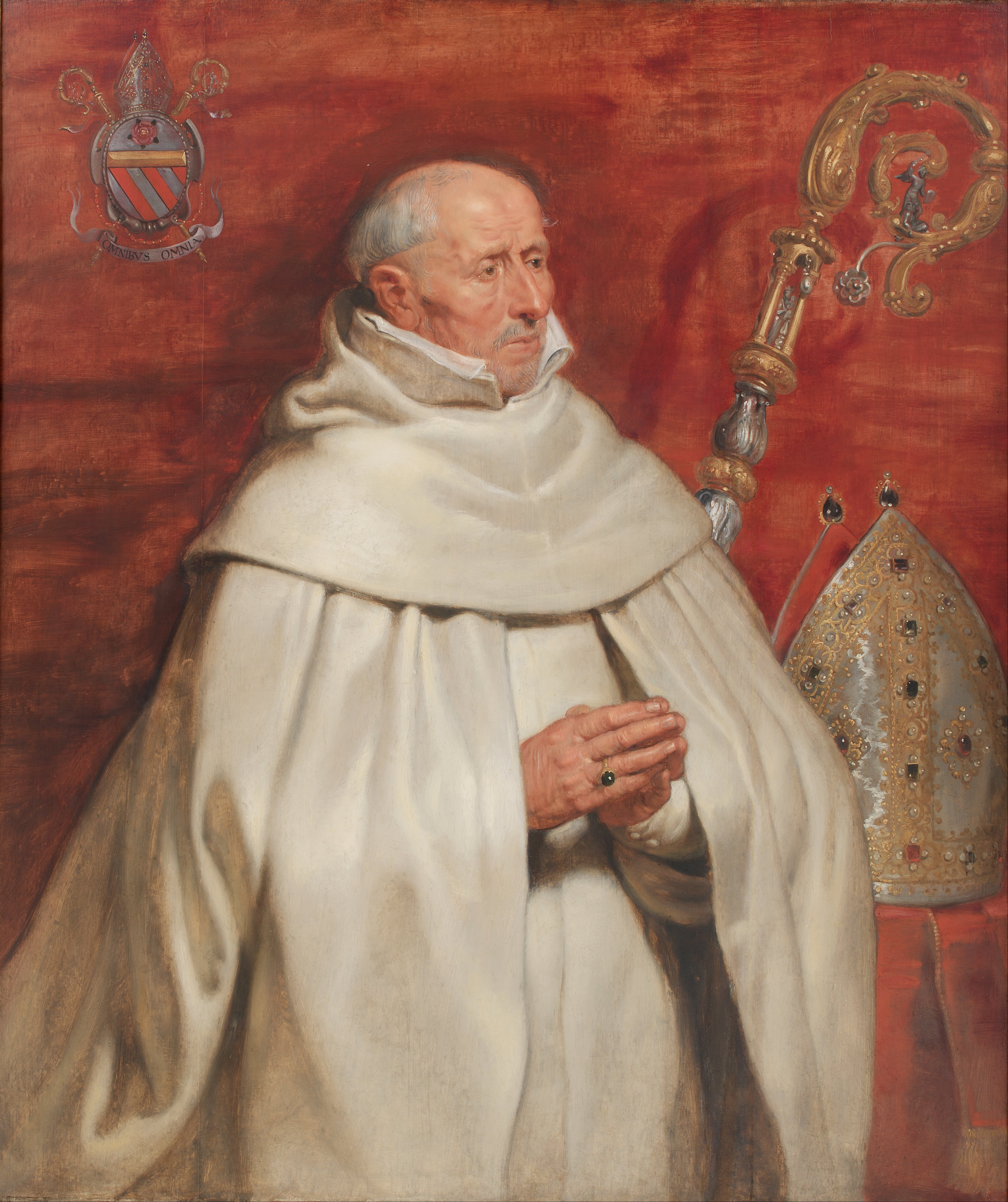
- Portrait by Peter Paul Rubens (ca. 1624)
- Church: Roman Catholic
- Installed: 1614
- Term ended: 1629
- Predecessor: Christianus Michælius
- Successor: Johannes Chrysostomus vander Sterre

Personal details
- Born: Mattheus van Iersel; 1541
- Died: 1629 (aged 87–88)

Matthæus Yrsselius or Irsselius, the Latinized form of Mattheus van Iersel (1541–1629), was abbot of St. Michael's Abbey, Antwerp, from 1614 until his death. He was remembered as a patron of the arts and sciences.

== Patronage ==
In 1624, he commissioned an altarpiece depicting the Adoration of the Magi from Peter Paul Rubens, paying for it in two installments of 750 guilders each in 1624 and 1626.

In 1627, the students of the Jesuit college in Antwerp put on a school play dramatizing the life of Norbert of Xanten, dedicating the production to Yrsselius.

At his death, Yrsselius bequeathed a celestial and a terrestrial globe, a cosmographic sphere, and an edition of the works of St Gregory the Great to the abbey library.

Catholic Church titles
Preceded by Christianus Michælius	Abbot of St. Michael's Abbey, Antwerp; 1614–1629	Succeeded by Johannes Chrysostomus vander Sterre
