= Adoration of the Magi (Parmigianino) =

Painting by Parmigianino

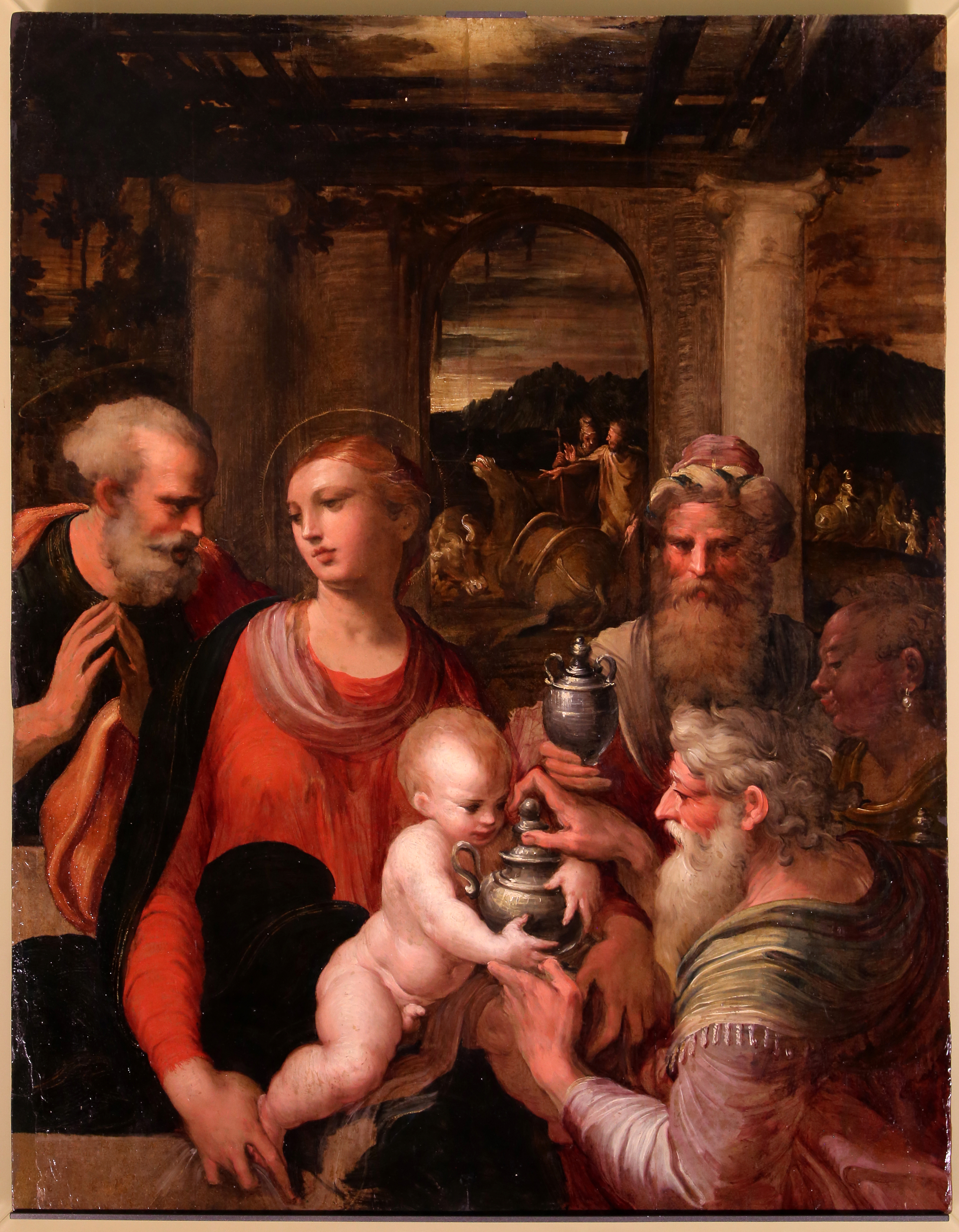
Adoration of the Magi (c. 1529) by Parmigianino

Adoration of the Magi is an oil on panel painting by Parmigianino, executed c. 1529, now in San Domenico church in Taggia (province of Imperia, Italy).

The work was in San Domenico church by at least 1622, since it was mentioned in that building's 1623 inventory by its priest Niccolò Calvi. It may have arrived there as a tribute to one of the brothers, who ran the Inquisition. At that time it was misattributed to Perin del Vaga and was later assigned to Luca Cambiaso and Girolamo da Treviso, before Roberto Longhi restored its present attribution by comparison with Parmigianino's Virgin and Child and Santa Margherita Madonna.
