= Adoration of the Magi (Rubens, Lyon) =

Painting by Peter Paul Rubens

The Adoration of the Magi
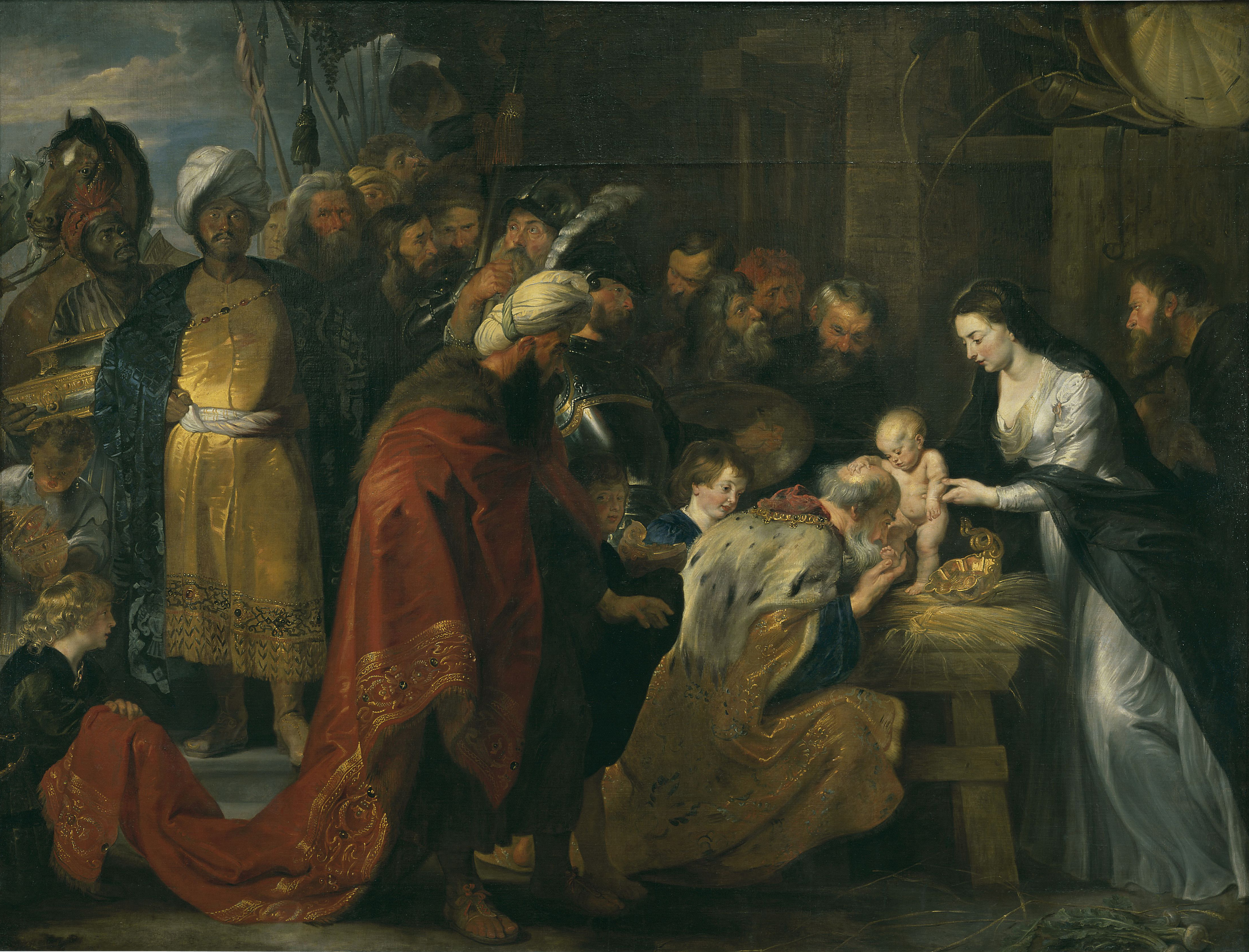
- Artist: Peter Paul Rubens
- Year: c. 1617–1618
- Dimensions: 251 cm × 328 cm (99 in × 129 in)
- Location: Museum of Fine Arts; Lyon

The Adoration of the Magi is a c.1617–18 painting by Peter Paul Rubens. It is now in the Musée des Beaux-Arts de Lyon

Since it is horizontal rather than vertical it was probably commissioned for a private collection rather than as an altarpiece. Peter C. Sutton suggested that, as Rubens' treatments of this subject in vertical formats were for known ecclesiastical commissions as altarpieces, the horizontal format, which is shared with Rubens' Adoration painted for the Statenkamer of Antwerp's town hall, c.1608–09, might suggest that the Lyon painting was also a secular commission. Rubens made a considerable fortune via the painting's reproduction in engravings and tapestries.

The painting arranges full-length figures across the canvas, backed by a frieze-like crowd showing a variety of mature male types, twelve in all. The oldest magus kneels and kisses the foot of the Christ Child with a tender gesture, as the Child, standing on a straw-strewn table, where he is presented by the Virgin Mary, touches the magus' bald head in a gesture of benediction. The dim stable is lit by shafts of light.

== History ==
The painting was purchased by Maximilian II Emanuel, Prince-Elector of Bavaria in Antwerp in September 1698, from Gijsbert van Ceulen, part of a spectacular group of paintings that included twelve other paintings by Rubens that are now among the Wittelsbach works of art from Schleissheim now in the Alte Pinakothek, Munich. It languished as a copy until Jacques Fouquart resuscitated its reputation, recognized as a major work of Rubens, in the exhibition Le siècle de Rubens, Paris, 1977–78.

== Description ==
In the Baroque style, this painting gives a desacralized version of the scene of the adoration of the child Jesus, held by the Virgin on a layer of straw, by the Magi: indeed, this one places his hand on the bald head of one of them, while the latter, kneeling, kisses one of his feet. The scene takes place in a dark stable lit by a ray of light coming from the left. The Magi have bright clothes, the shapes of which draw arabesques, and are surrounded by servants presenting the offerings of these Magi. The figures are arranged along the entire length of the canvas, the crowd appearing as if forming a frieze, showing in the background a crowd of soldiers, individuals observing the scene and even horses that fill every space of the painting.

== See also ==
- Adoration of the Magi (Rubens), for other treatments of the subject
