= Johannes Chrysostomus vander Sterre =

Ecclesiastical writer and abbot of St. Michael's Abbey

The High Reverend Lord Johannes Chrysostomus vander Sterre O.Praem.
- abbas S. Michaelis Antwerpiensis
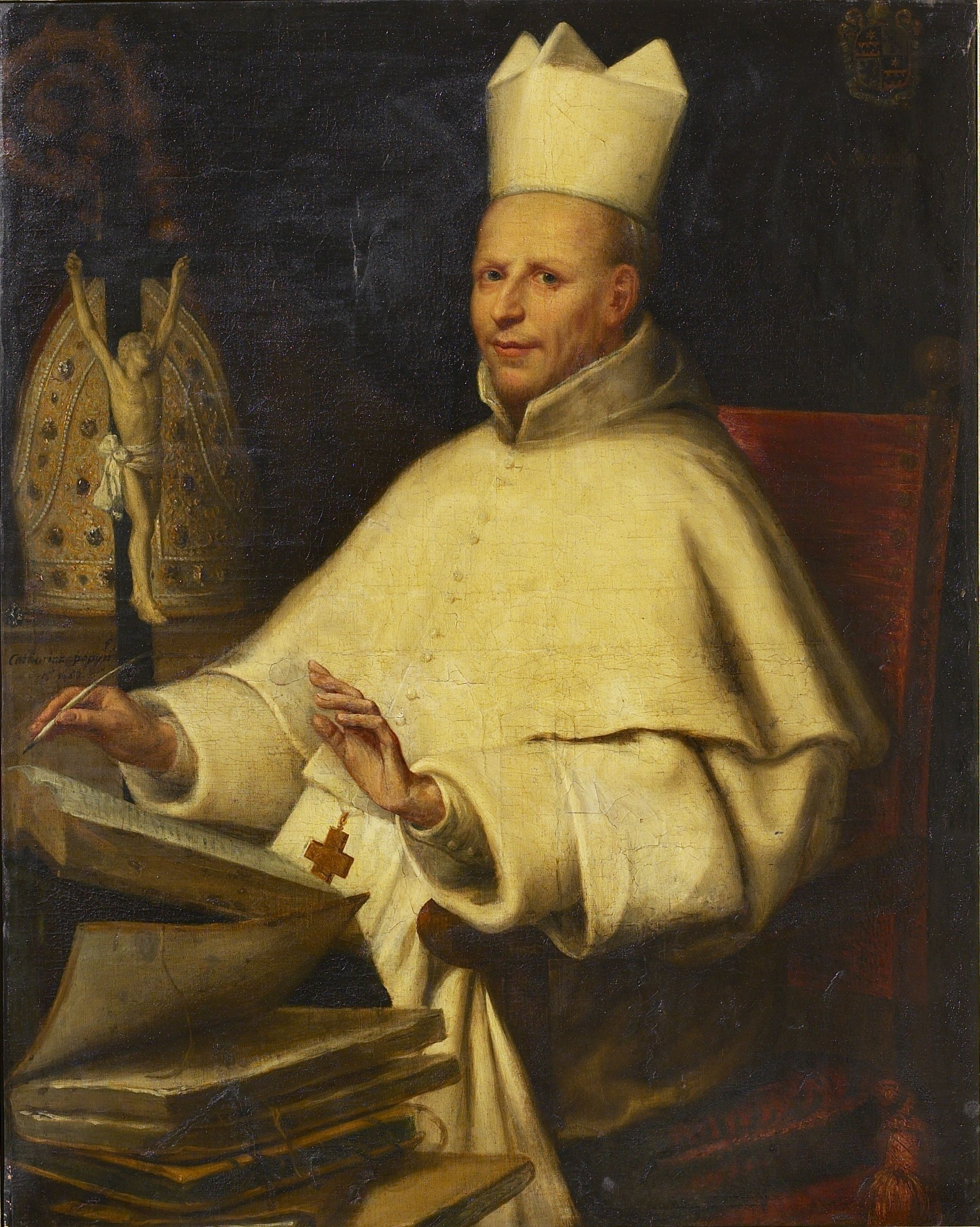
- Portrait by Katharina Pepijn (1652)
- Church: Roman Catholic
- Installed: 1629
- Term ended: 1652
- Predecessor: Matthæus Yrsselius
- Successor: Norbert van Couwerven

Personal details
- Born: 9 March 1591 's-Hertogenbosch
- Died: 23 July 1652 (aged 61) Antwerp
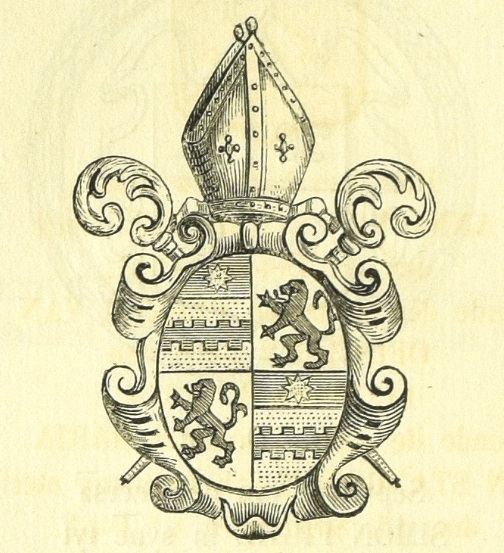
- Coat of arms

Johannes Chrysostomus vander Sterre (1591–1652), sometimes Jean Chrysostome Van der Sterre or Joannes Chrysostomus Stella, was an ecclesiastical writer and abbot of St. Michael's Abbey, Antwerp.

== Life ==
Vander Sterre was born in 's-Hertogenbosch on 9 March 1591. He was educated at the Jesuit college in Antwerp, and entered St Michael's Abbey in the city, eventually becoming abbot on 7 October 1629. He died on 23 July 1652.

As abbot he was a patron of the arts, among other works having a choir screen installed in the abbey church by Johannes van Mildert. He was also a patron of literature, at least three books printed in Antwerp being dedicated to him.

== Writings ==
- Vita Sancti Norberti (Antwerp, 1622) – a life of Norbert of Xanten. Plantin Office edition, 1656, available on Google Books
  - Dutch translation, Het leven van den H. Norbertus, sticht-vader der Ordre van Praemonstreyt ende apostel van Antwerpen, in dry boecken beschreven (Antwerp, 1623) Available on Google Books
- Natales sanctorum candidissimi ordinis Praemonstratensis (Antwerp, 1625) Available on Google Books
- Lilium inter spinas. Vita Beati Josephi presbyteri et canonici Steinveldensis ordinis Premonstratensis (Antwerp, 1627) – a life of Hermann Joseph. Available on Google Books
- Martinus Mertz, Rosa in hieme. Vita Wilhelmi Rothensis, sanctae et immortalis memoriae, in Suevia canonici, ordinis Praemonstratensis, edited by Van der Sterre (Antwerp, 1627) – a life of Wilhelm Eiselin. Available on Google Books
- Echo S. Norberti triumphantis (Antwerp, 1629) Available on Google Books

== Dedications ==
Works dedicated to Vander Sterre include:

- Richardus Versteganus, Medicamenten teghen de melancholie (Antwerp, Hendrick Aertsens, 1633)
- Christophorus van Essen, Den waerom? Den Daerom. De exempelen ende waerheyt met eene voorstellinge ende beklach des oorloghs (Antwerp, Hendrik Aertssens, 1634). The author is identified as "fencing master in Antwerp".
- Arnold de la Porte, Compendio de la lengua española. Institutie vande Spaensche tale (Antwerp, Caesar Joachim Trognaesius, 1637)

Catholic Church titles
Preceded by Matthæus Yrsselius	Abbot of St. Michael's Abbey, Antwerp; 1629–1652	Succeeded by Norbert van Couwerven
