= Adoration of the Magi (Perugino, Città della Pieve) =

Fresco by Pietro Perugino

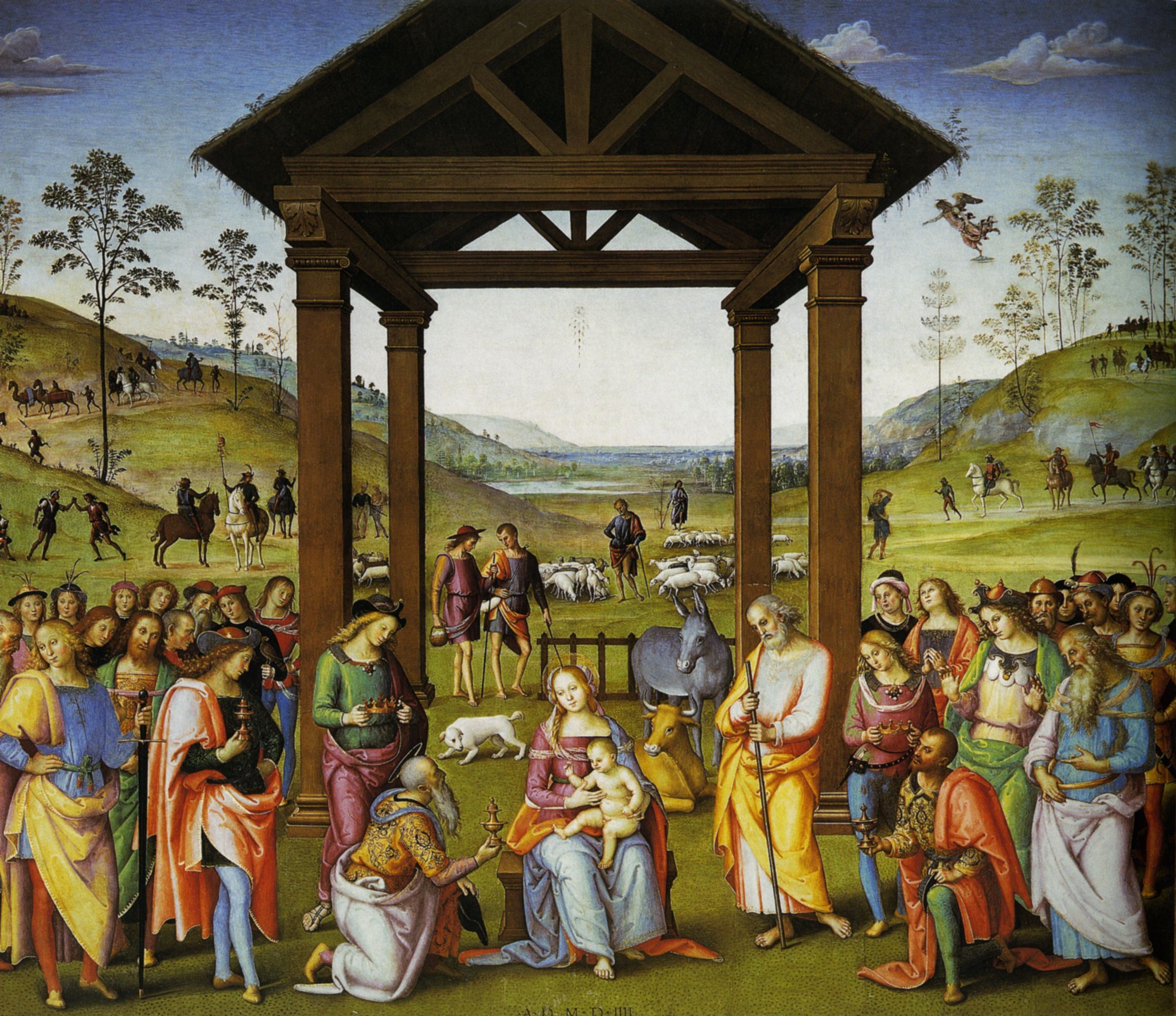
- Artist: Perugino
- Year: 1504
- Medium: fresco
- Dimensions: 650 cm × 700 cm (260 in × 280 in)
- Location: Oratorio di Santa Maria dei Bianchi, Città della Pieve

Adoration of the Magi is a 1504 fresco by Perugino in the Oratorio di Santa Maria dei Bianchi in Città della Pieve. It shows the Adoration of the Magi, with an idealised view from Città della Pieve towards Lake Trasimene and Val di Chiana in the background. It is often compared to the Adoration of the Magi in the Sala delle Udienze del Collegio del Cambio in Perugia by Perugino and his studio, which includes areas argued by some art historians to have been painted by a young Raphael.

It was commissioned from him that year by the 'Sindaco della Compagnia dei Disciplanti' - the date is shown by two letters sculpted along the same wall by the artist and uncovered during works to improve the wall's drainage in 1835. Perugino demanded 200 florins for the work but was willing "as a fellow citizen" to be content with 100 in installments. After several interventions by the Sindaco, he reduced the price to 25 florins but in return demanded to be granted the "dignity of a great Master". The work was restored in 1984.

== Bibliography ==
- (in Italian) Vittoria Garibaldi, Perugino, in Pittori del Rinascimento, Scala, Florence, 2004 ISBN 888117099X
