= Adoration of the Magi (Perugino, Trevi) =

Fresco by Pietro Perugino

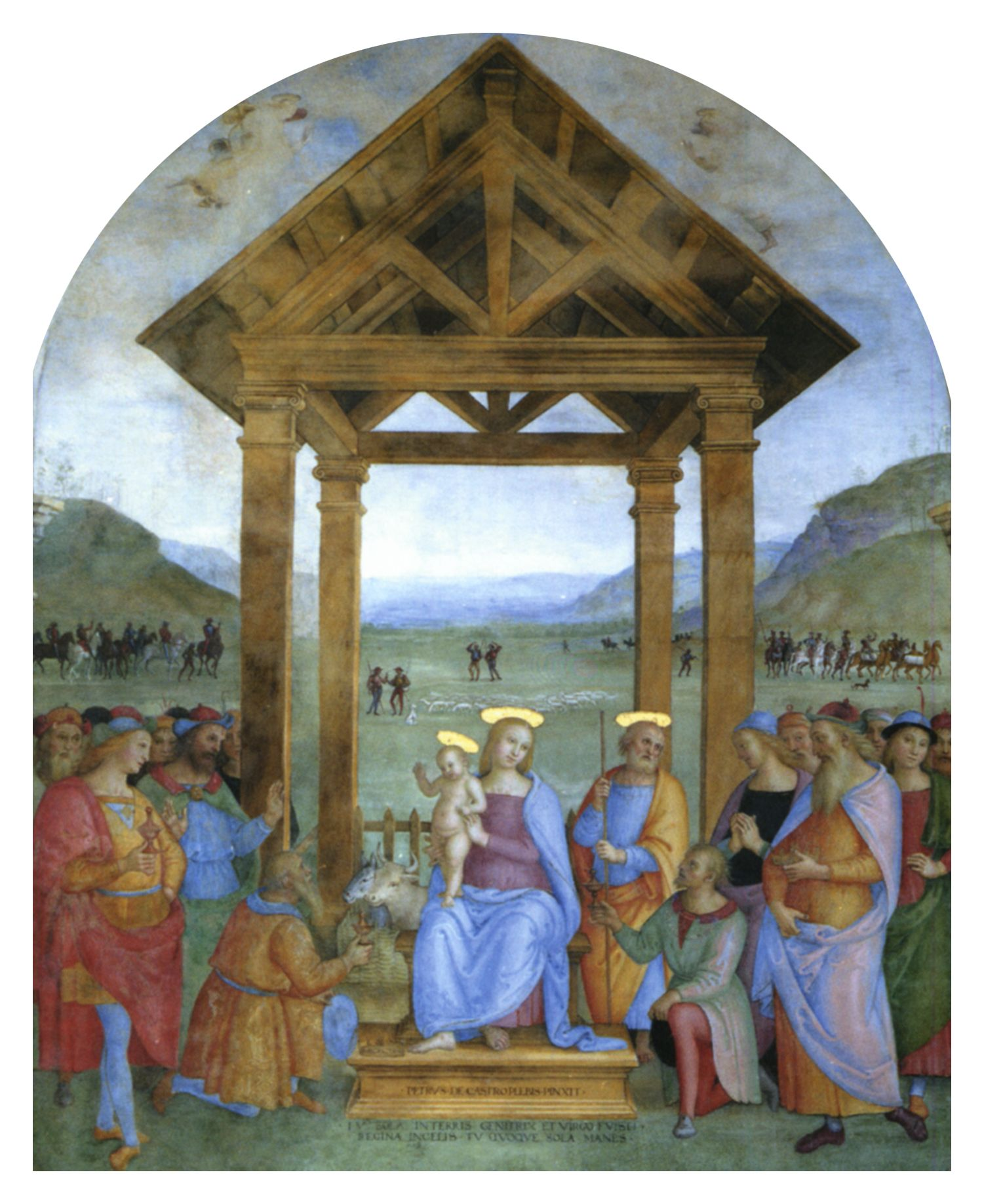
- Artist: Perugino
- Year: 1521–1522
- Medium: fresco
- Location: Madonna delle Lagrime, Trevi

Adoration of the Magi is a c. 1521–22 fresco by Perugino in the Cappella dell'Adorazione dei Magi (also known as the Capella del Presepio) in the Madonna delle Lagrime church in Trevi.

It shows the Adoration of the Magi. It is signed on the base of the throne:

P E T R U S D E C A S T R O P L E B I S P I N X I T

and inscribed below the throne is this couplet:

TU SOLA IN TERRIS GENITRIX ET VIRGO FUISTI
REGINA IN CELIS TU QUOQUE SOLA MANES.

== Bibliography ==
- (in Italian) Tommaso Valenti, La chiesa monumentale della Madonna delle Lagrime, Rome, Desclée, 1928, p. 160–174.
- (in Italian) Vittoria Garibaldi, Perugino, in Pittori del Rinascimento, Scala, Florence, 2004 ISBN 888117099X
