= Adoration of the Magi (Gothic boxwood altarpiece) =

Miniature attributed to Adam Dircksz's workshop

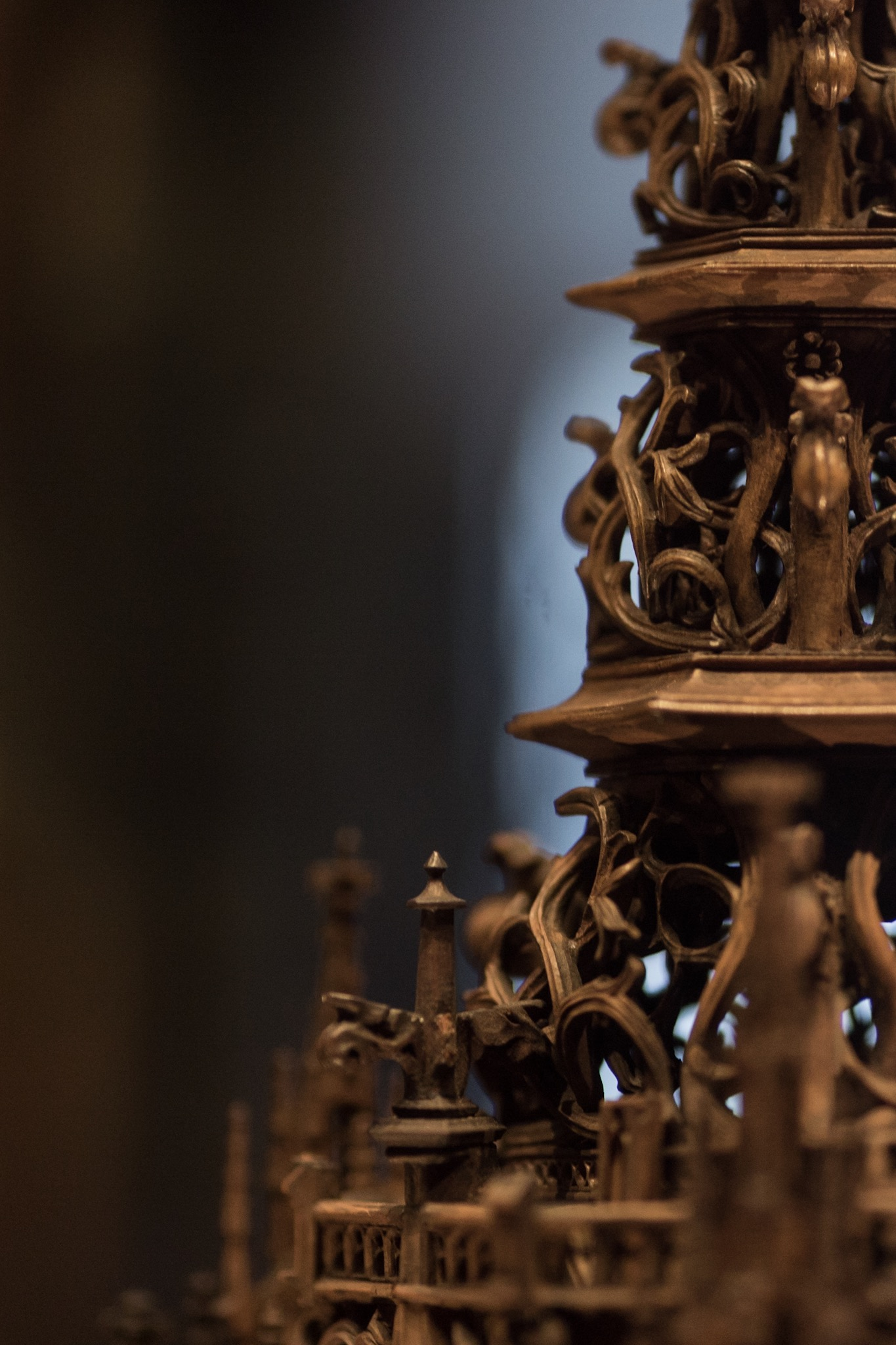
Detail

The Adoration of the Magi altarpiece is a small Gothic boxwood miniature, made in the Netherlands c. 1500–1530, attributed to the workshop of Adam Dircksz (also known by the Latin name Adam Theodrici or Adam Theodrisi, a common misspelling when referring to his name). Such rarefied and highly ornate objects were intended for private devotion, and took, by modern art historian estimates, decades to complete, periods equivalent to the entire career of a medieval master carver. Just around 150 of these sculptures from the late 15th and early 16th centuries remain today, and the elite echelons of collectors in the 19th century placed a high value on them despite the fact that it is unknown how many of them were manufactured.

The boxwood is held by Wallace Collection in London, where it is describes as "one of the most important works from the mysterious workshop of Adam Dircksz".

== Description ==
=== Iconography ===
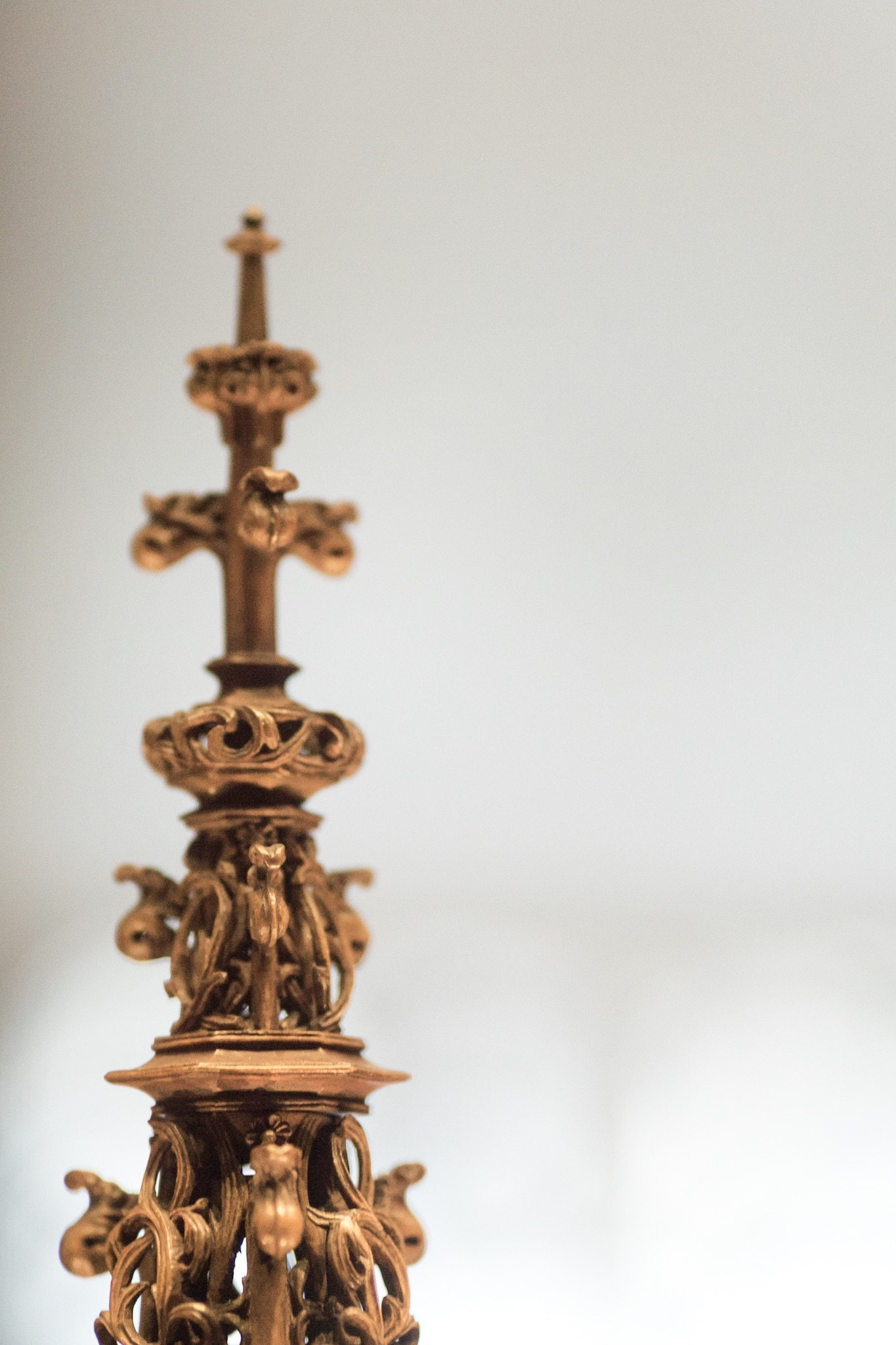
Detail of the upper spire

The object is made from intricately carved boxwood, and measures 43.8 by 21 by 12 centimetres (17.2 in × 8.3 in × 4.7 in). It has four main elements, each elaborately decorated in Gothic style. The main body (corpus) has two doors that open to reveal three New Testament scenes, creating a triptych sculpture: a central depiction of the Adoration of the Magi; the Nativity of Jesus on the left wing, with the Annunciation to the Shepherds in the background; and a scene combining the Presentation of Jesus at the Temple, the Flight into Egypt, and the Massacre of the Innocents on the right wing. With the doors are closed, the exterior surfaces of the corpus are decorated with Old Testament scenes: the main body shows Abraham and the Angels, with the drunkenness of Noah and the building of the Noah's Ark on the left wing, and Jacob's dream on the right wing.

The corpus is surmounted by a spire with foliate decoration on four levels, and it is supported by a column decorated with more Old Testament scenes: the Temptation of Adam, the Expulsion from the Garden of Eden, Adam digging and Eve spinning, and their children Cain and Abel. The column stands on a base decorated with scenes from Genesis, showing the creation of the animals, the creation of Adam, and the creation of Eve.

=== Inscriptions ===
The altarpiece bears a number of Latin inscriptions, quoting or inspired by passages in the Bible. At the front of the base, below the creation of Adam, is the inscription: "FACIA[MVS] ٠ HO[M]I[N]E(M) ٠ AD ٠ [IMA]GINE[M]", taken from Genesis 1:26 ("Let us make man in our image and likeness".

Below the creation of the animals is: "CRESCITE ٠ ET ٠ MVLTIPLICAM" (Genesis 1:22: "increase and multiply"); and below the creation of Eve is: "PER ٠ H[OMO] ٠ ADHEREB[IT] ٠ VXOR[I] ٠ SV[AE]" ("man embraces his wife"). On the outside of the right wing is: "NOE ٠ CUM ٠ PLATASSET ٠ VINE[A]M ٠ BIBENS ٠ DE ٠ VINO ٠ IN[E]BRIATUS" (Genesis 9:20–21 "When Noah drank some of its wine, he became drunk"); on the outside of the main body: "TRES ٠ VIDIT ٠ ET٠ VNVM ٠ ADORAVIT" (Genesis 18:2 "He sees three and worships one"); and on the outside of the left wing: "IN ٠ BACVLO ٠ MEO ٠ T[R]ANSIVI ٠ IORDANEM ٠ ET ٠ CUM ٠ TRIBUS ٠ TURMIS ٠ REFERT" (Genesis 32:10: "I had only my staff when I crossed this Jordan, but now I have become two camps.")

Further inscriptions on the triptych sculpture inside the corpus are revealed by opening the doors. On the right wing: "TVAM IPSIVS A[N]I[M]AM PERTRANSIET" (Luke 2:35: "your own soul will be pierced"); on the central piece: "VIDEANTES STELLAM MAGI" (Matthew 2:10: "Seeing the star, the wise men"); and on the left wing: "ET TV BETHLE[H]E[M] IVDA / NICLAES" (Matthew 2:6: "And you Bethlehem in the land of Judah / Nicholas"). It has been suggested that the inclusion of St Nicholas and the name "Niclaes" may indicate the first name of the person who commissioned the altarpiece.

== Provenance ==
It was created in the Netherlands in the early 16th century and intended for personal devotional use by a wealthy collector. It was acquired by Sir Richard Wallace from the art dealer Charles Mannheim in Paris in October 1871.

A similar but less ornate boxwood triptych, also attributed to the workshop of Adamn Dircksz, is held by the Rijksmuseum in Amsterdam. Others are held by the Statens Museum for Kunst in Copenhagen, the Louvre in Paris, and the Metropolitan Museum of Art; an unusual example with Renaissance and Italianate elements is held by the British Museum.

== Gallery ==
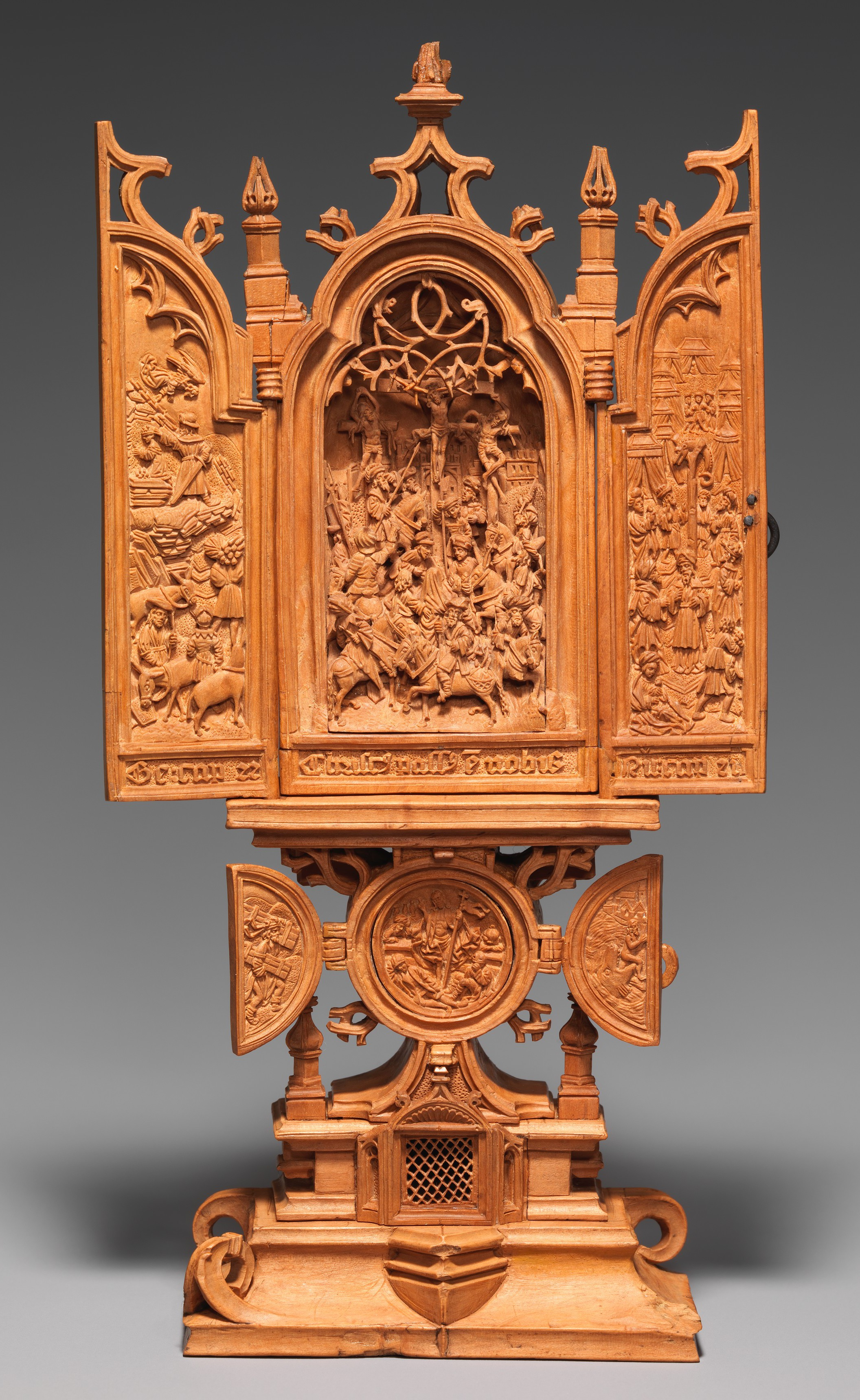
Miniature Altarpiece with the Crucifixion, The Cloisters, Metropolitan Museum of Art

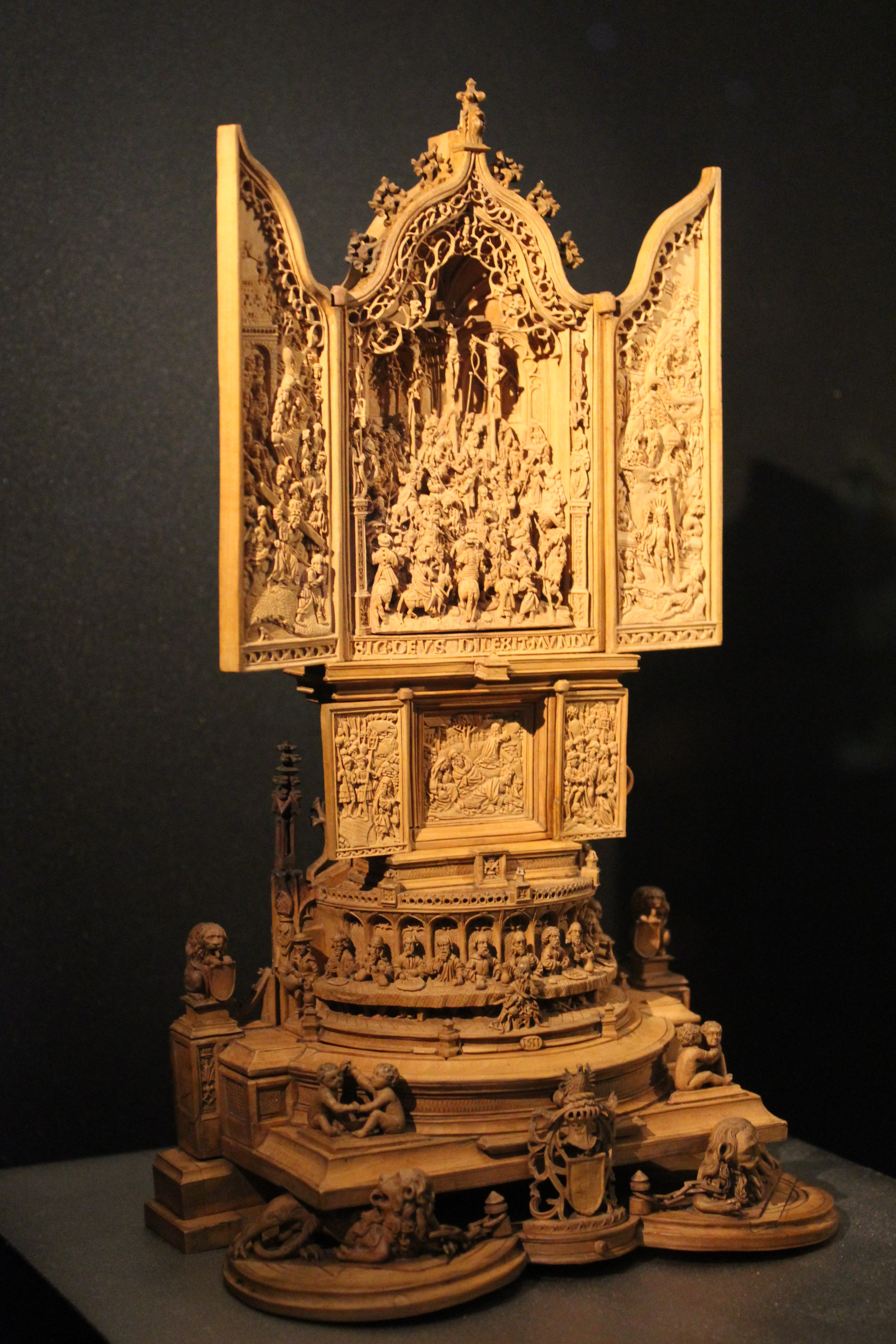
Boxwood altar in the British Museum
