= Adoration of the Magi (Correggio) =

1515–1518 painting by Correggio

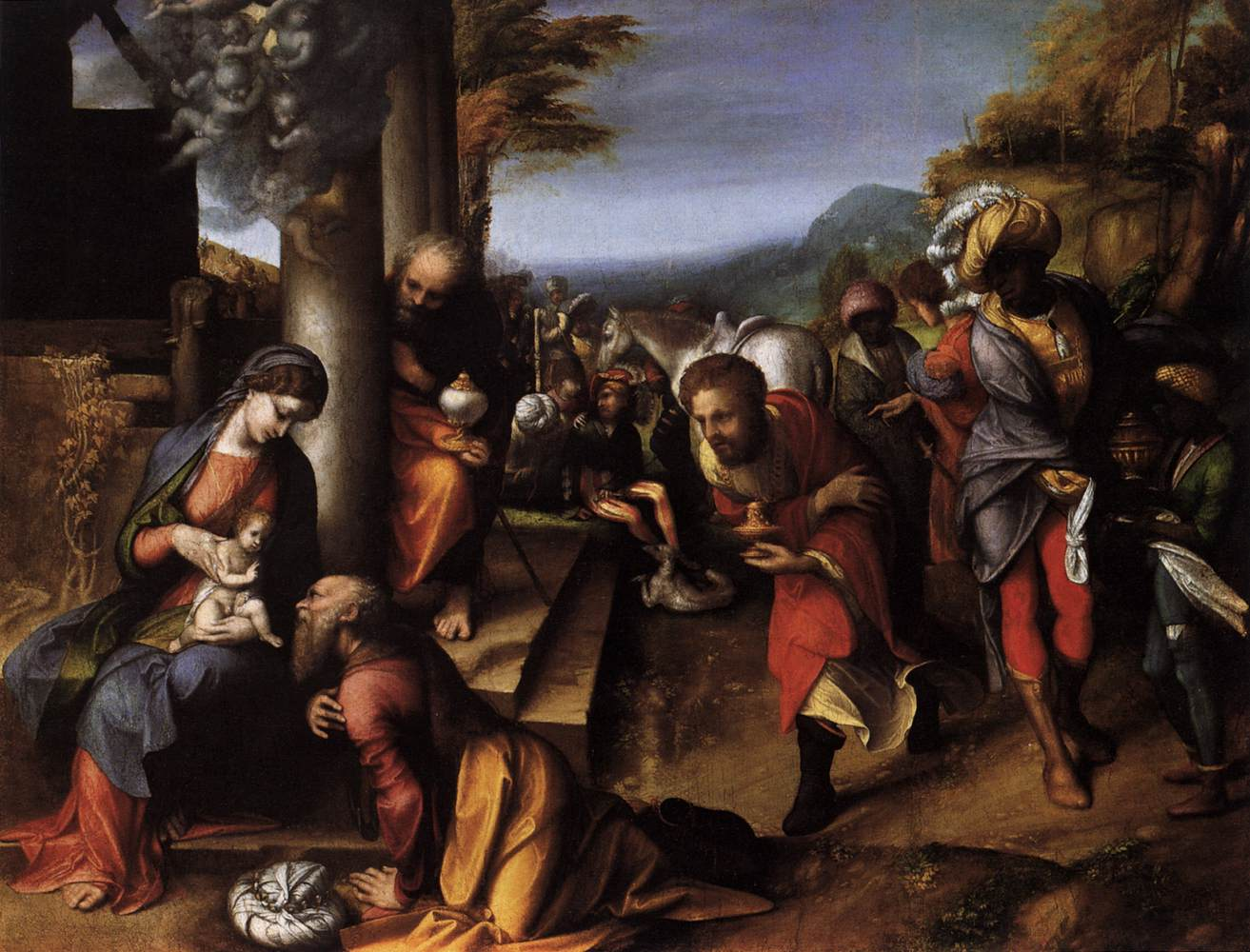
- Artist: Antonio da Correggio
- Year: c. 1515–1518
- Medium: Oil on canvas
- Dimensions: 84 cm × 108 cm (33 in × 43 in)
- Location: Pinacoteca di Brera; Milan

The Adoration of the Magi is a painting by the Italian late Renaissance painter Correggio, executed around 1515–1518. It is housed in the Pinacoteca di Brera of Milan, Italy.

== History ==
The painting was acquired by the Brera collection in 1895, attributed to Scarsellino, coming from the collection of cardinal Cesare Monti, from whom in 1650 it had been transferred to the archdiocese of Milan. In the 19th century it was assigned to Correggio, dating from his early career.

== Sources ==
- Adani, Giuseppe (2007). Correggio pittore universale. Correggio: Silvana Editoriale.
