= Adoration of the Magi (Rembrandt) =

Painting by Rembrandt

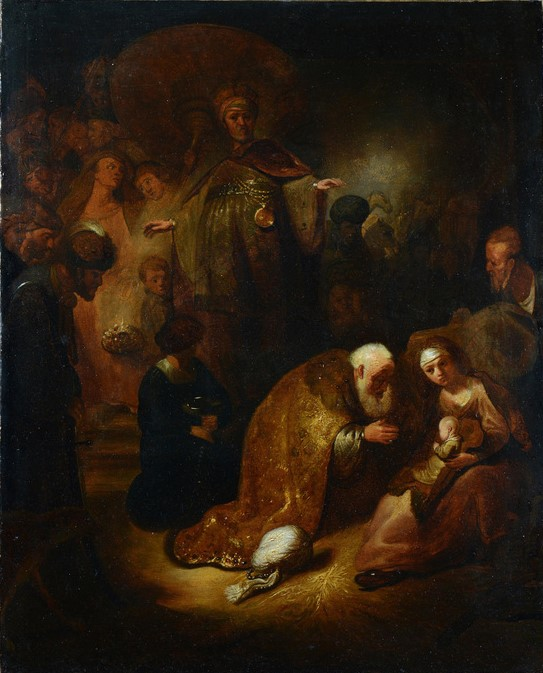
- The Adoration of the Magi
- Artist: Rembrandt
- Year: 1632
- Medium: Oil on paper on canvas
- Dimensions: 54 cm × 44 cm (21 in × 17 in)

The Adoration of the Magi is a painting of c. 1632 to 1633 recently attributed to Rembrandt.

It was recognized as an original in 2016 after it fell off the wall at the home of its owners in Rome. They took it to be restored as the fall damaged the frame. The restorer realized the painting was not a copy as the owners believed. The French Academy in Rome confirmed its authenticity on June 22, 2021. The Academy, supported by the Fondazione Patrimonio Italia (FPI), displayed the work at a symposium titled "Rembrandt: Identifying the Prototype, Seeing the Invisible" at its Villa Medici headquarters. The work was thought to have been lost and has been known only from copies in the Hermitage Museum and the Gothenburg Museum of Art.

The work is oil on paper applied to canvas. It measures 54 centimeters by 44 centimeters. It was likely painted in preparation for a series of engravings on the Life and Passion of Christ.

== See also ==
- List of paintings by Rembrandt
