= Santa Margherita Madonna =

Painting by Parmigianino

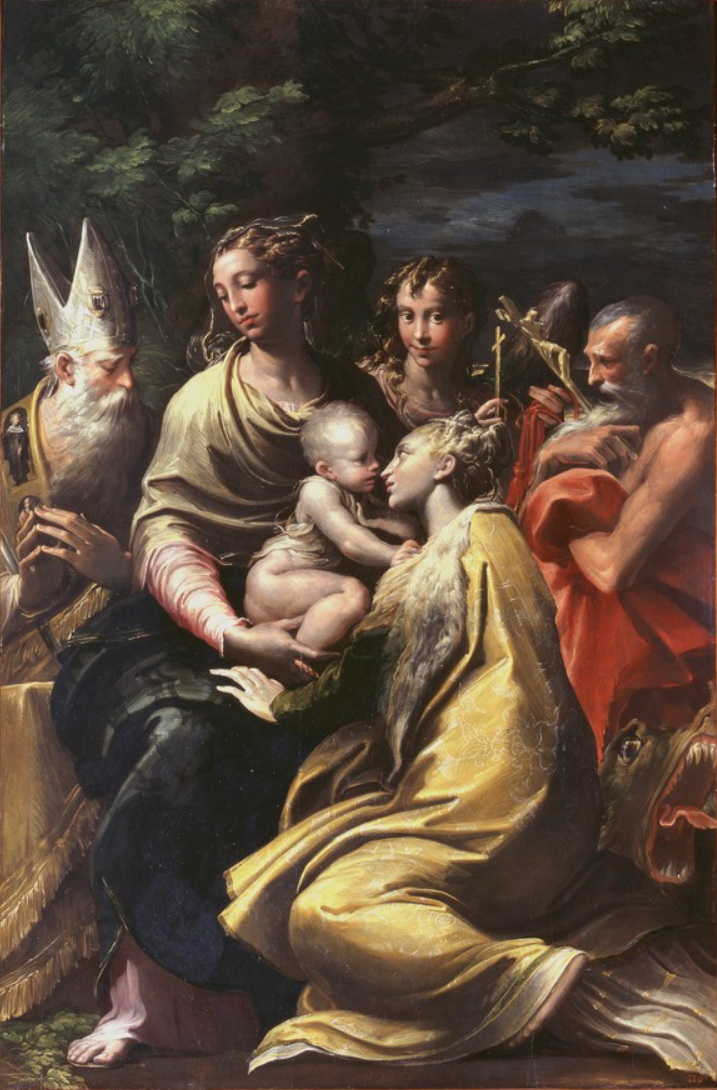
Santa Margherita Madonna (1529-1530) by Parmigianino

The Santa Margherita Madonna is an oil on panel painting by Parmigianino, from 1529-1530. It is held in the Pinacoteca Nazionale di Bologna.

== History ==
A fundamental work from the artist's time in Bologna between 1527 and 1530, it was painted for the nuns of the Santa Margherita convent. In his Lives of the Artists Vasari stated that it showed "Our Lady, Saint Margaret of Antioch, Saint Petronius, Saint Jerome and Saint Michael". In 1686 Malvasia stated it had been commissioned by the Giusti family, but this was in error since that family only owned that chapel from 27 August 1529 onwards and in fact the nuns had on 8 April 1530 given the painting and 150,000 lire in exchange for a house next door to the nunnery from Giovanni Maria Giusti, so that that nobleman could decorate his chapel there as soon as the convent church was complete.

Lamo (1560) and Zanti (1583) both praised the work, adjudging it "one of the rare things, considered extremely rare". In 1674 Scaramuccia stated it was among Guido Reni's favourite paintings, whilst in 1784 father Ireneo Affò called it "the most beautiful of all" the artist's works.
