= Adoration of the Magi (Rubens, Antwerp) =

Painting by Peter Paul Rubens

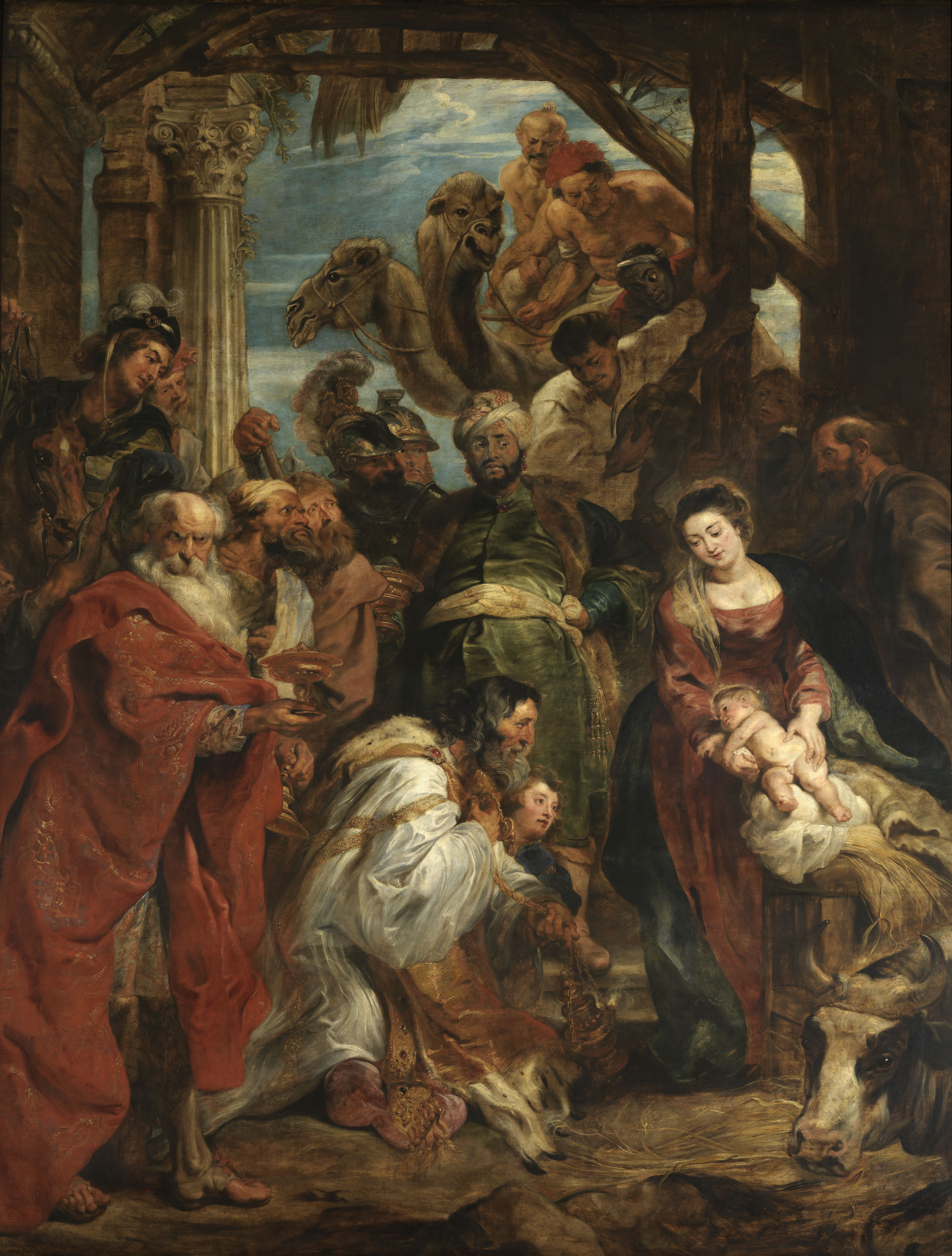
Adoration of the Magi (1624) by Rubens

The Adoration of the Magi is a 1624 oil on canvas painting by Peter Paul Rubens, measuring 447 cm by 336 cm. It was commissioned by Matthæus Yrsselius, abbot of St. Michael's Abbey, Antwerp, as an altarpiece, and paid for in two instalments of 750 guilders each in 1624 and 1626. The Virgin Mary is thought to have been modelled on Rubens' first wife Isabella Brant. The painting is now in the Royal Museum of Fine Arts Antwerp.

== In popular culture ==
The painting is an important story arc in the comic book album "De Raap van Rubens" ("Rubens' apprentice") (1977) in the Belgian comic book series Suske en Wiske. The characters visit it in the Royal Museum of Fine Arts in Antwerp. Later the man in the red cloak on the painting comes alive and steals a necklace from Lambik. In order to find out why the man does this Lambik travels back in time, to the era of Peter Paul Rubens.

== See also ==
- Adoration of the Magi (Rubens), for other treatments of the subject

== Bibliography ==
- Ricart, Joan (coord.) (2008). Rubens. Barcelona:Sol 90. ISBN 978-84-9820-766-8.
