= St. Michael's Abbey, Antwerp =

Coordinates: 51.2150°N 4.3932°E

St Michael's Abbey
- Sint-Michielsabdij
- St Michael's Abbey, Antwerp, engraved after Peter Paul Rubens
- Interactive map of St Michael's Abbey

Monastery information
- Other name: Abbatia Sancti Michaelis Antverpiae
- Order: Premonstratensian
- Established: 1124
- Disestablished: 1795

People
- Founder: Norbert of Xanten

Architecture
- Status: suppressed 1795
- Functional status: demolished 1831

St Michael's Abbey in Antwerp was a Premonstratensian abbey founded in 1124 by Norbert of Xanten and laid waste during the French Revolutionary Wars. In 1807 a semaphore station was installed in the tower of the church. The buildings were demolished in 1831.

The abbey has been described as "one of the key churches and most significant monuments in Antwerp from its foundation in the 12th century to its destruction in the nineteenth."

== History ==
Until 1124 a collegiate church dedicated to Saint Michael and served by 12 secular canons was the only parish church in Antwerp. In 1124 the chapter was reformed by St Norbert as a Premonstratensian abbey. The abbey buildings stood between what are now the streets Kloosterstraat and Sint-Michielskaai, and Sint-Jansvliet in the north and the Scheldestraat (Kronenbrugstraat) in the south.

The abbey obtained large tracts of land in and around Antwerp, such as the lordships of Kiel and Beerschot, the land of Haringrode and Zurenborg, and as late as 1674 Berendrecht and Zandvliet, which helped shape the ultimate territory of Antwerp.

The abbey was partly destroyed by the French army during the War of the First Coalition in 1796. Many of the buildings were demolished to create military barracks and a naval arsenal with shipyards and slipways. In 1807 the tower of the abbey church was equipped with a semaphore. In 1831 the French barracks were bombarded by the Dutch garrison Commander David Hendrik Chassé, whose troops were holding the Citadel of Antwerp.

== Art ==
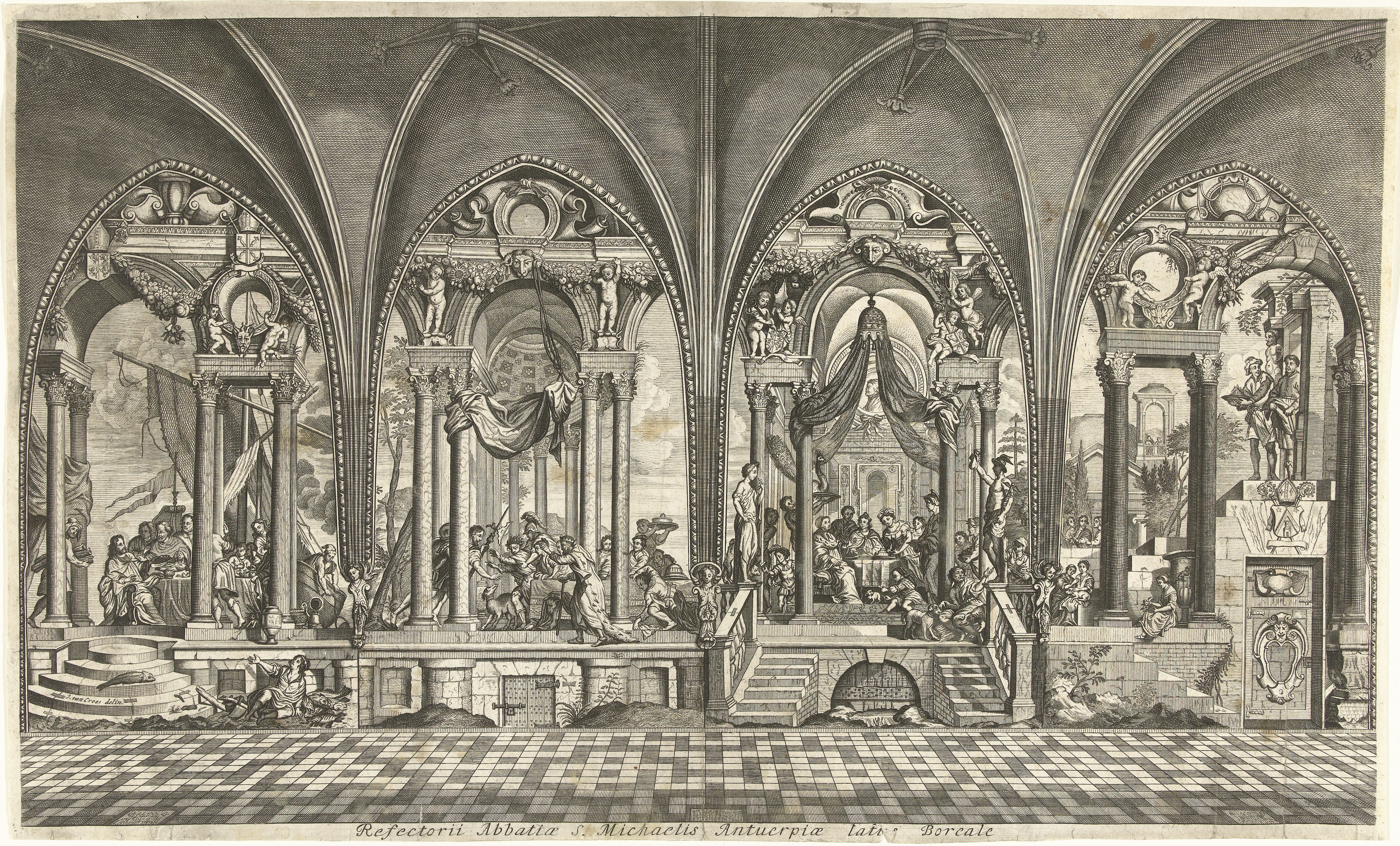
An engraving showing the paintings in the refectory

Isabella of Bourbon (1436-1465), second wife of Charles the Bold, Duke of Burgundy, and the mother of Mary of Burgundy, heiress of Burgundy, died in the abbey in 1465 and was buried in the abbey church. In 1476 a monumental tomb was erected in her memory. It was decorated with 24 bronze statuettes of pleurants standing in niches, known as 'weepers' or 'mourners', with a bronze effigy of Isabella herself surmounted on it. The remnants of the pleurants are now kept in the Rijksmuseum (Amsterdam) and in M - Museum Leuven. The rest of the tomb, with the statue of Isabella, is now in Antwerp Cathedral. Nothing more of the tomb furnishings survives.

In the 17th century the monastery was well known as a patron of the arts, commissioning works from major Antwerp painters such as Peter Paul Rubens, Anthony van Dyck and Jacob Jordaens. Around 1624 Rubens delivered a monumental altarpiece for the abbey church, The Adoration of the Magi. It was stolen during the French occupation and after 1815 was returned to the Royal Museum of Fine Arts (Antwerp). The Baroque altar itself, without the Rubens painting, was salvaged for use in Zundert (Netherlands) and is now in the Church of St Trudo there.

The floor with many tombstones was transferred to the Cathedral of Our Lady, that had lost its floor during the French occupation.

The 18th-century communion bench and the confessional are now in the Church of St Gertrude in Bergen op Zoom (Netherlands).

== Abbots ==
List to 1709 from Jean François Foppens, Historia episcopatus Antverpiensis (Joannes Franciscus Broncart, Liège, 1717), pp. 147–150.

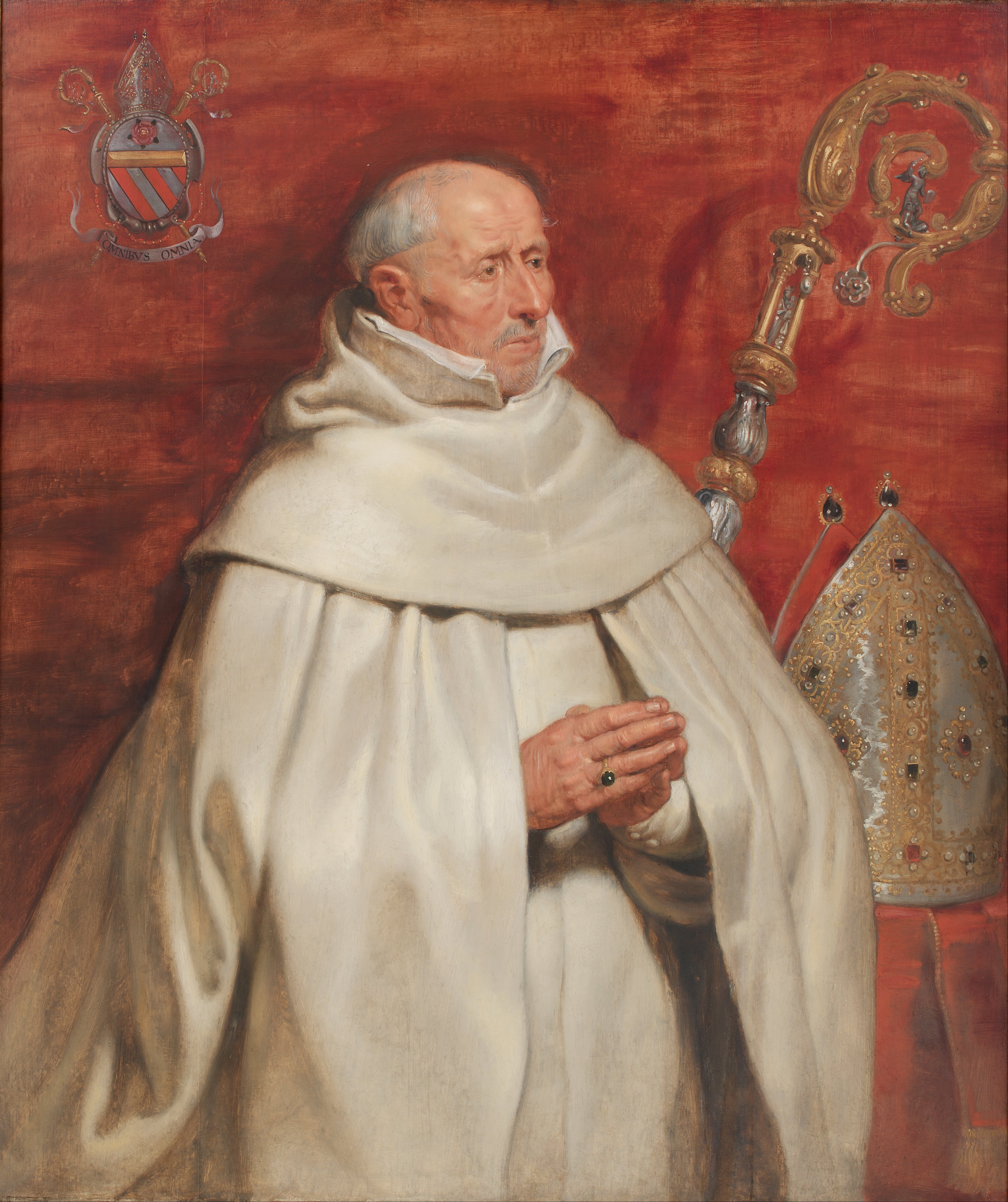
Abbot Yrsselius, portrait by Rubens

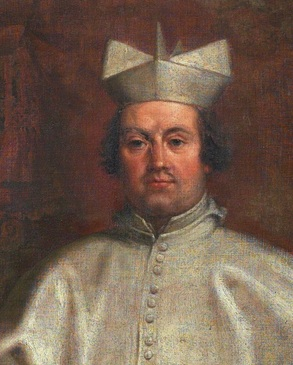
Abbot Teniers, portrait in Tongerlo Abbey

1. Waltmannus, 1124–1138
2. Emelinus, died 1161
3. Alardus, died 1162
4. Thibaldus, resigned 1171
5. Richardus, resigned 1188
6. Waltherus de Stripe, died 1192
7. Elias, died 1199
8. Giselbertus, died 1205
9. Hugo, died 1208
10. Arnoldus de Erps, translated 1219
11. Hermannus, died 1230
12. Sigerius, died 1230
13. Eggerius, died 1244
14. Gerardus de Lira, died 1258
15. Joannes de Lira, died 1272
16. Aegidius de Biervliet, died 1286
17. Henricus de Mechlinia, died 1300
18. Godefridus de Waerloos, died 1328
19. Guilielmus de Cabeliau, died 1341
20. Guilielmus Lympiaes, died 1353
21. Martinus Loys, died 1372
22. Guilielmus Brulocht, died 1390
23. Petrus Breem, died 1413
24. Arnoldus (c. 1415)
25. Olardus Terlinck, died 1452
26. Joannes Fierkens, died 1476
27. Andreas Aechtenryt, died 1478
28. Joannes Robyns, died 1486
29. Joannes de Weerdt, died 1499 : Post Tenebra espere Lucem.
30. Jacobus Elsacker, died 1505
31. Jacobus Embrechts, died 1514
32. Stephanus a Thenis, died 1518
33. Cornelis de Mera, died 1538
34. Gregorius de Dagis, died 1562
35. Cornelius Emerici, died 1563
36. Guilielmus de Greve, died 1581
37. Emericus Andreae, died 1590
38. Dionysius Feyten, died 1612
39. Christianus Michaelius, died 1614
40. Matthæus Yrsselius, died 1629
41. Johannes Chrysostomus vander Sterre, died 1652: Luce et ardens.
42. Norbert van Couwerven, died 1661: Vince.
43. Macarius Simeomo, STL, died 1676: Vigila.
44. Hermannus vander Poorten, died 1680: Virtus acressit in Umbra.
45. Gerardus Knyff, died 1686: Ad astra per Arghem.
46. Joannes Chrysostomus Teniers, died 1709: Tene Quod Bene.
47. John Baptiste Vermoelen: Premende Coronant.
48. Frans Ignace de Lams: Mansuete.
49. Joseph Jacob vander Boven: de sursum.
50. Jean Chrisosthpme Sammels: Dulciter et Velociter.
51. Jacob Thomas: Procede Fideliter.
52. Anthony Vaerendonck: Crescite in Gratia.
53. Marcell de Vos: Gaute et suaviter.
54. Guilhem Fracis Rosa: Per Crucem ad Astras.
55. Auguste Pooters: Lucere et Ardere Protectum. Final Abbot ordained in 1790. Died 1816 in Antwerp.

== Burials ==
A number of notable people were buried in the church, including:

- Philip I Rubens, brother of Peter Paul Rubens
- Maria Pypelinckx
- Isabella Brant and her parents, Joannes Brant and Claire de Moy
- Abraham Ortelius
- Michiel Cnobbaert
