= Adoration of the Magi (Signorelli) =

Painting by Luca Signorelli in the Louvre

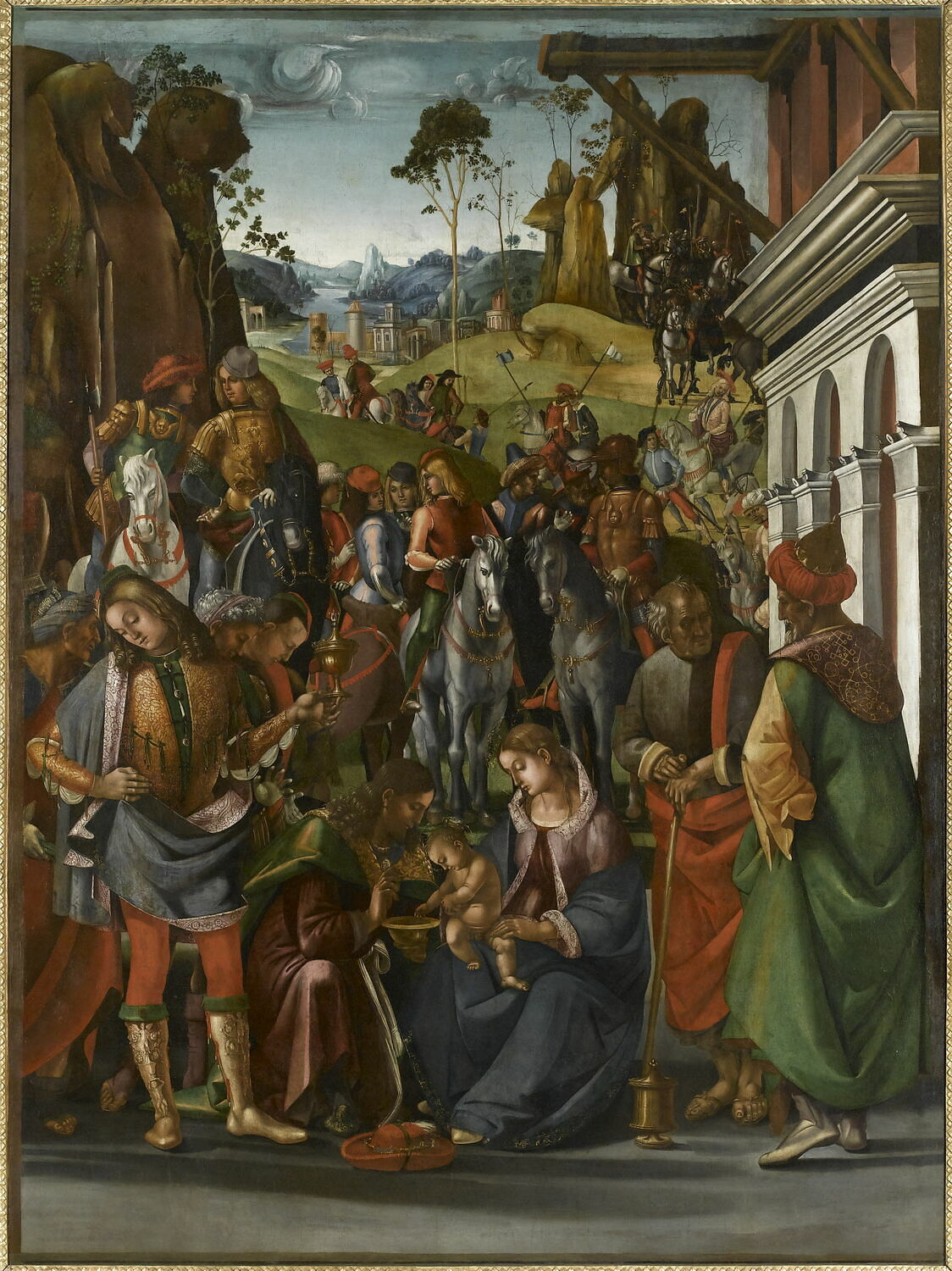
Adoration of the Magi (1493–1494), Louvre

Adoration of the Magi is a painting in tempera on wood panel by Luca Signorelli (1450–1523) and his assistants, executed c. 1493–1494, and now in the Louvre in Paris. It was probably the first painting he produced in Città di Castello, and originally hung over the main altar of the monastery church of Sant'Agostino. The surface displayed within the frame is 331 cm by 245.5 cm. In late 2022 it was not on display.

It was the main element in an altarpiece that is now dispersed. Four small predella panels now in other collections have been connected by art historians with the piece. These are now in a private collection in Scotland, the Virginia Museum of Fine Arts in Richmond, the National Gallery of Art in Washington, and the John G. Johnson Collection in the Philadelphia Museum of Art.

Signorelli was born in the town of Cortona in Tuscany, about 20 kilometres from Città di Castello in Umbria. In his early 40s he had returned to live in Cortona, after working in Florence, Siena and Rome (1478–1484, painting a now lost section of the Sistine Chapel). With an established reputation, he remained based in Cortona for the rest of his life, but often travelled to the cities of the region to fulfill commissions. This altarpiece comes a few years before the large set of frescos in Orvieto Cathedral which have always been regarded as his masterpiece. Probably trained by Piero della Francesca in Florence, as his cousin Giorgio Vasari wrote, his Quattrocento style was about to become rather out of date over the following years. The earliest documented painting by the young Raphael was the Baronci Altarpiece (1500–1501) for the same church for which this altarpiece was painted; this was badly damaged in an earthquake in 1789, and only fragments survive.

== Description ==
In contrast to many of Signorelli's paintings, the scene is tranquil and rather static, with attention focused on the principal figures who are lined up across the foreground of the picture space. The three Biblical Magi (or Three Kings) are, as was usual, differentiated by age and race, although their names, ages and races are not consistent. The black king is most often a young figure, but here the king at the left is white and blond-haired, the kneeling one in the centre in his prime, and the king at right has a dark complexion, though hardly any darker than that of Saint Joseph with whom he is talking.

== Attribution ==
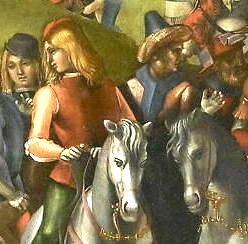
The horses with "curious mannerisms of too closely-placed nostrils, and human eyebrows"

Though most art historians now attribute the painting to Signorelli, with assistance from his workshop team, some in the past thought that he had only designed or underdrawn the composition, leaving the painting to his team. Maud Cruttwell, in the first monograph in English, published in 1899, following Crowe and Cavalcaselle, thought he had done the "drawing only". She bases this in part on the "impressive dignity" of the main figures, but also from what she regards as the tell-tale "badly-drawn horses ... for it will be noticed all through his work that he has never cared to thoroughly master their form, and paints them always with curious mannerisms of too closely-placed nostrils, and human eyebrows, which show how little attention he had given to their anatomy."

== Predella ==
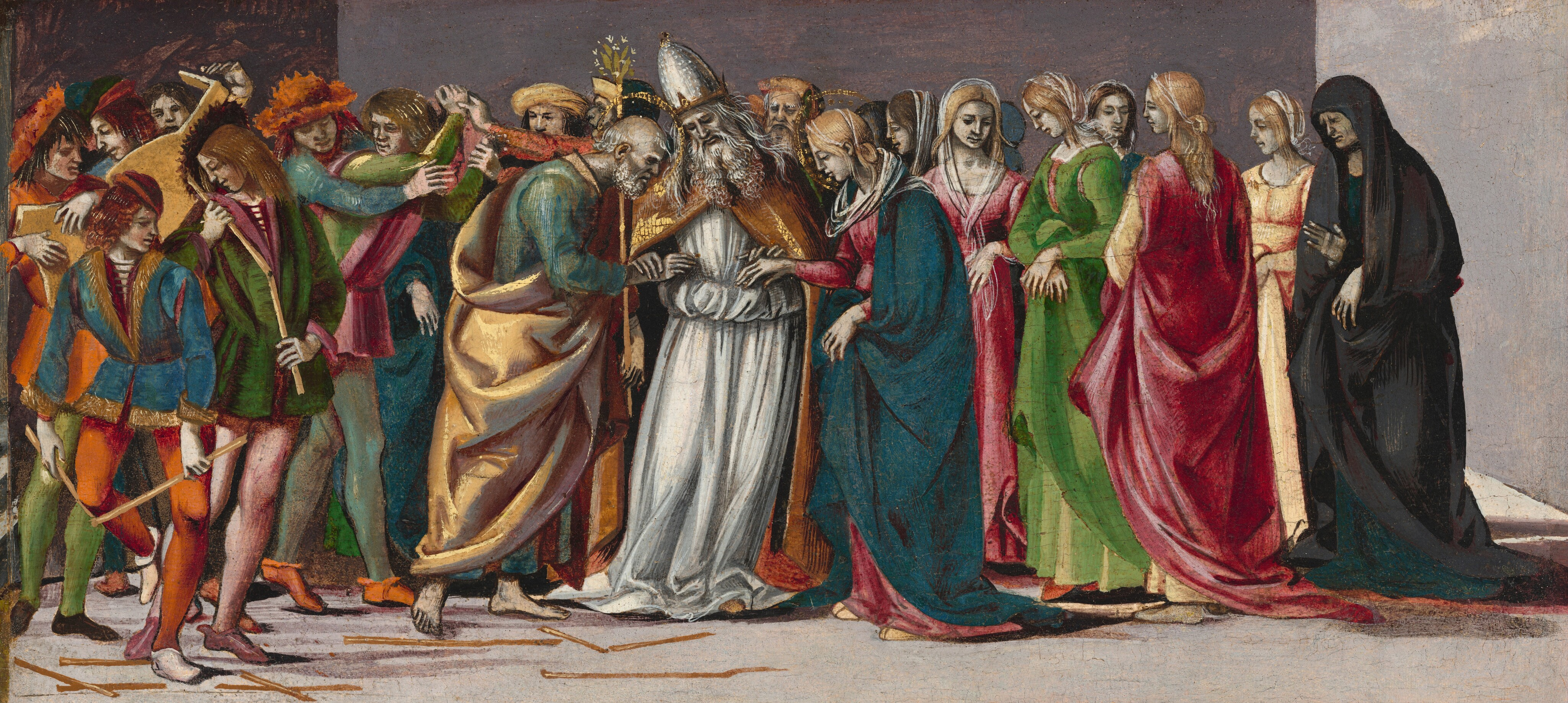
Marriage of the Virgin predella section, NGA

At least later in his career, Signorelli sometimes did the drawn cartoon for the main section of altarpieces, but left the painting to his workshop. But he might paint the small predella panels himself, as is thought to have been the case for a work of 1521.

The National Gallery of Art in Washington has a Marriage of the Virgin, and Philadelphia an Annunciation, and in Richmond, Virginia, there is a Presentation of the Virgin. The panel the Louvre says is in a Scottish private collection perhaps belongs to Robert Lindsay, 29th Earl of Crawford; Cruttwell listed Lord Crawford's collection in London as having two Signorelli predella parts: "1. Meeting of Joachim and Anna. 2. Birth of the Virgin".

It is not clear when the predella panels were separated from the main scene. They first went to a smaller church on Cortona, and by 1819 were in a private collection there.

== History ==
The altarpiece was perhaps commissioned by Vitellozzo Vitelli, who like his father Niccolò Vitelli (d. 1486) was a condottiero and ruler of the town. Signorelli painted portraits of both of them. A few years later Vitellozzo fell out with Cesare Borgia, who had him strangled in 1502, after which the town was taken into the Papal States.

The main panel was still in the monastery in 1617. After an earthquake in 1789 it was probably sold to Pope Pius VI; it is recorded in his family's Palazzo Braschi in Rome in 1838. At some point thereafter it passed to the Campana collection in Rome (as Campana 245), then after Giampietro Campana's bankruptcy and imprisonment for fraud it was sequestered with the rest of the collection by the Papal government in 1861, who arranged to sell it to the Louvre; it entered their collection in 1863 (as MI 540).
