= Adoration of the Magi (Rubens, Cambridge) =

Painting by Peter Paul Rubens

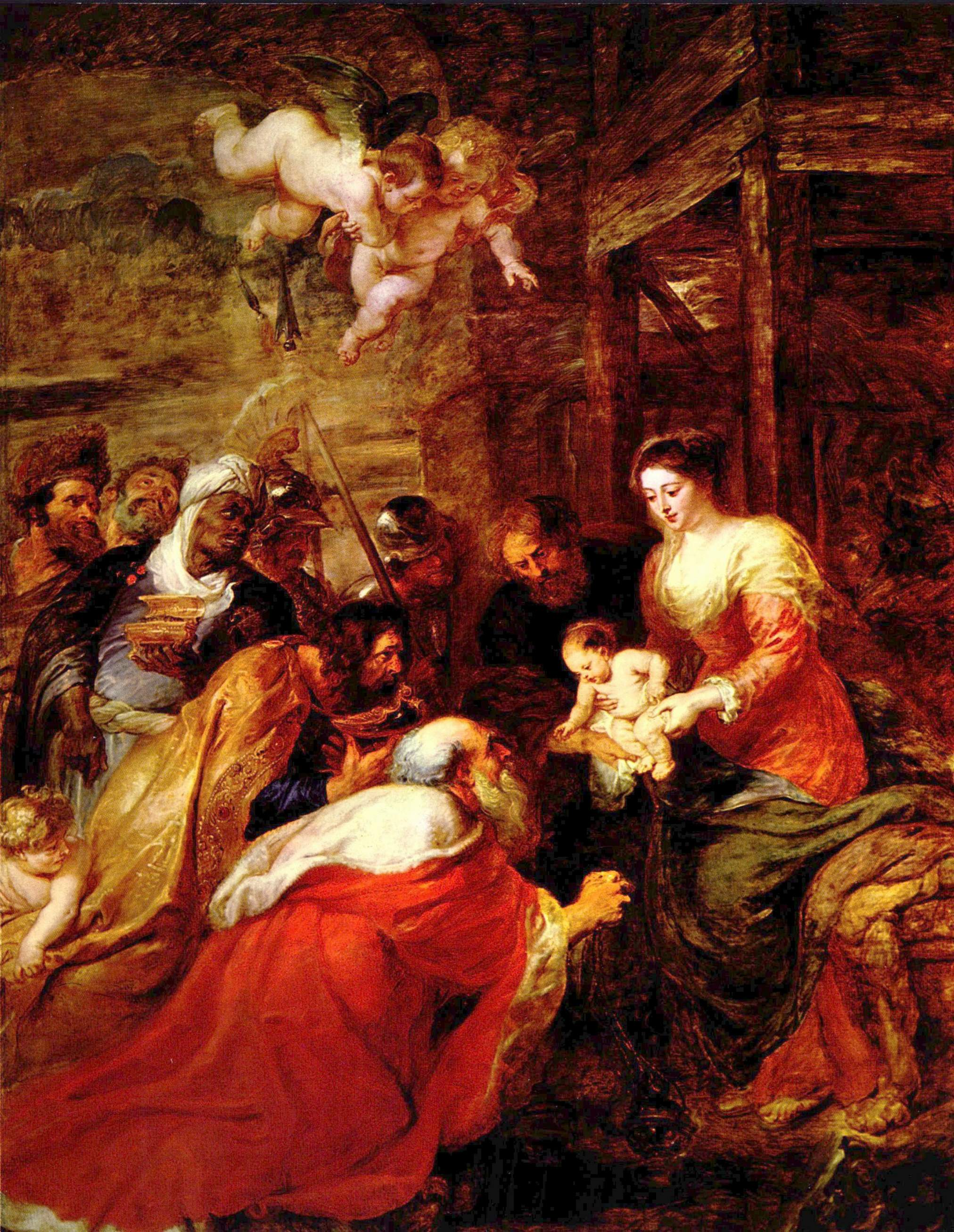
- Artist: Peter Paul Rubens
- Year: 1632–33
- Medium: Oil on panel
- Dimensions: 3.28 m × 2.49 m (10 ft 9 in × 8 ft 2 in)
- Location: King's College Chapel, Cambridge

The Adoration of the Magi is an altarpiece dating to 1633–34 by the Flemish Baroque artist Peter Paul Rubens, originally created for a convent in Louvain. It is currently housed in King's College Chapel, Cambridge, England. According to the Corpus Rubenianum Ludwig Burchard, the work was executed in oil on panel and measures 3.28 m x 2.49 m (10 ft 9 in x 8 ft 2 in).

== History ==
The Adoration of the Magi was painted in 1632–33 as an altarpiece for the chapel at the Convent of the White Nuns in Louvain, then the Spanish Netherlands and now Belgium. A preparatory oil sketch for this painting can be found in the Wallace Collection, London. It was engraved by Hans Witdoeck in 1638.

The painting was sold after the 1780 suppression of convents, and came into the collection of William Petty, 1st Marquess of Lansdowne in England in 1788. After his death it was sold in 1806 to Robert Grosvenor, 2nd Earl Grosvenor (later Marquess of Westminster) and bequeathed through the Grosvenor family.

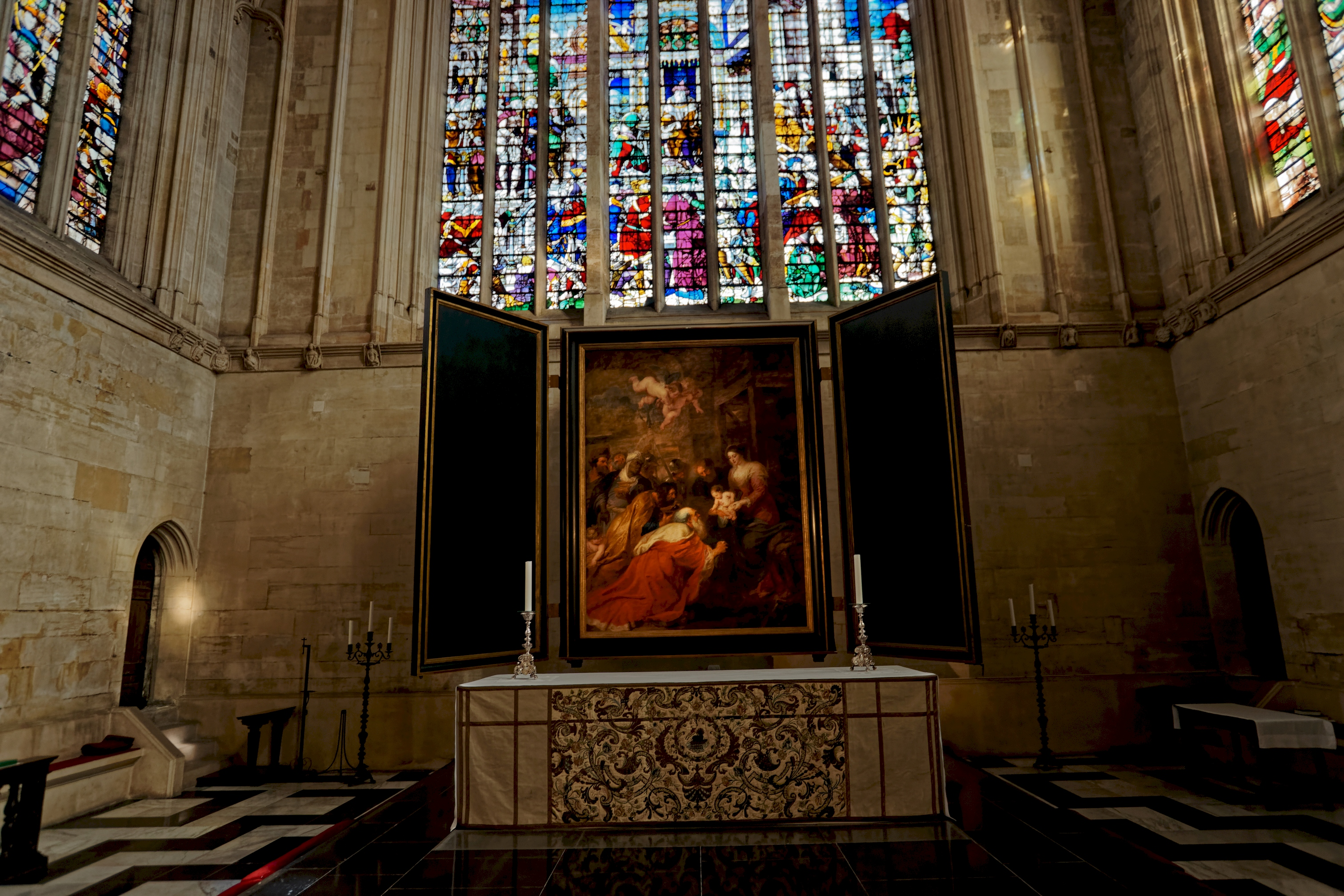
The painting installed as an altarpiece at King's College Chapel, Cambridge

The painting was sold from the estate of Hugh Grosvenor, 2nd Duke of Westminster at Sotheby's in 1959 and bought for a world-record price of £275,000 by property millionaire Alfred Ernest Allnatt. Two years later he donated it to King's College, Cambridge.

The college accepted "this munificent gift" with the intention of displaying the painting in the college chapel, possibly as an altarpiece. The painting was initially displayed in the college's antechapel, but the decision was taken to modify the east end of the main chapel so it could be installed as an altarpiece. The floor at the east end was lowered by removing the three steps leading up to the altar so the painting would not obscure the chapel's stained glass windows. The oak panelling, a communion rail and reredos (designed by Detmar Blow and installed in 1906) were also removed. The changes remain controversial with critics denouncing the destruction of "irreplaceable features" causing "incalculable" damage to the building's spirituality - all for the sake of appearances during the chapel's annual television broadcasts of Festival of Nine Lessons and Carols.

A wooden triptych frame was created for the painting, which included a new harlequin grisaille, and Rubens' painting was installed at the east end of the chapel in 1968, where it remains.

In June 1974 the painting was vandalised, with two-foot-high letters "IRA" scratched on it.

== See also ==
- Adoration of the Magi (Rubens), for other treatments of the subject by Rubens
- Adoration of the Magi (Filippino Lippi)
- Adoration of the Magi (Gentile da Fabriano)
- Adoration of the Magi of 1475 (Botticelli)
- Adoration of the Magi (Andrea della Robbia)
- Adoration of the Magi (Leonardo)
- Adoration of the Magi (Mantegna)
- Adoration of the Magi (Velázquez)
