= Adoration of the Magi (Ospedale degli Innocenti) =

Painting by Domenico Ghirlandaio

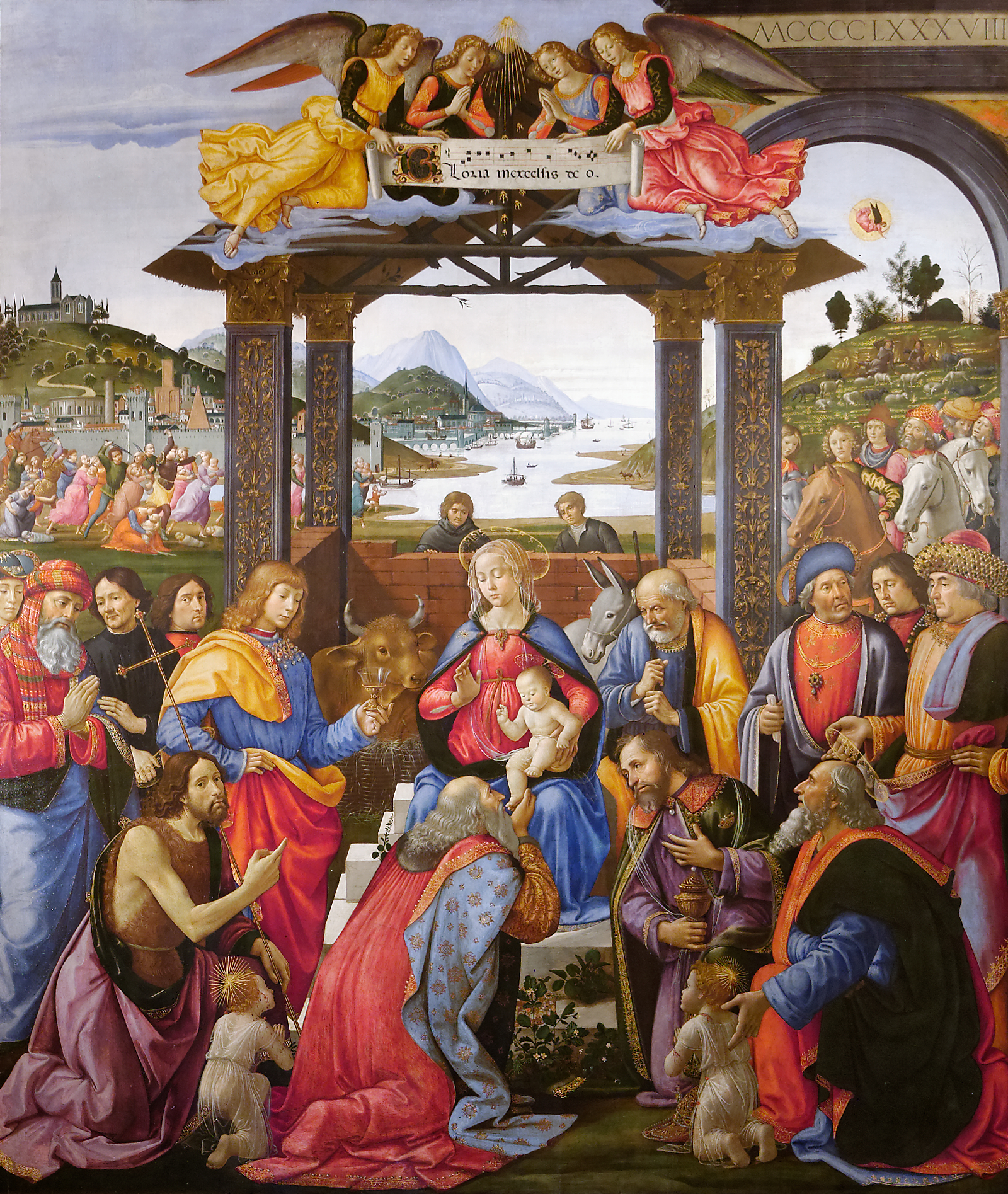
- Artist: Domenico Ghirlandaio
- Year: 1485–1488
- Medium: Tempera on panel
- Dimensions: 285 cm × 243 cm (112 in × 96 in)
- Location: Ospedale degli Innocenti, Florence

The Adoration of the Magi is a painting by the Italian Renaissance master Domenico Ghirlandaio, executed around 1485–1488 and housed in the Ospedale degli Innocenti gallery in Florence, Italy. The predella, painted by Bartolomeo di Giovanni, is in the same site.

== History ==
On 28 October 1485 Francesco di Giovanni Tesori, prior of the Ospedale degli Innocenti, Florence's foundling hospital signed a detailed contract with Ghirlandaio regarding the commission of an altarpiece for the high altar of the annexed church of Santa Maria degli Innocenti. The subject chosen was the Adoration of the Magi, a common theme in 15th-century Florentine art. The contract specified that the master himself had to paint it (to avoid the frequent use he made of his workshop), according to a drawing approved by the commissioner, and it had to be painted using precious colors. The work should be completed within thirty months, in reward of 115 florins.

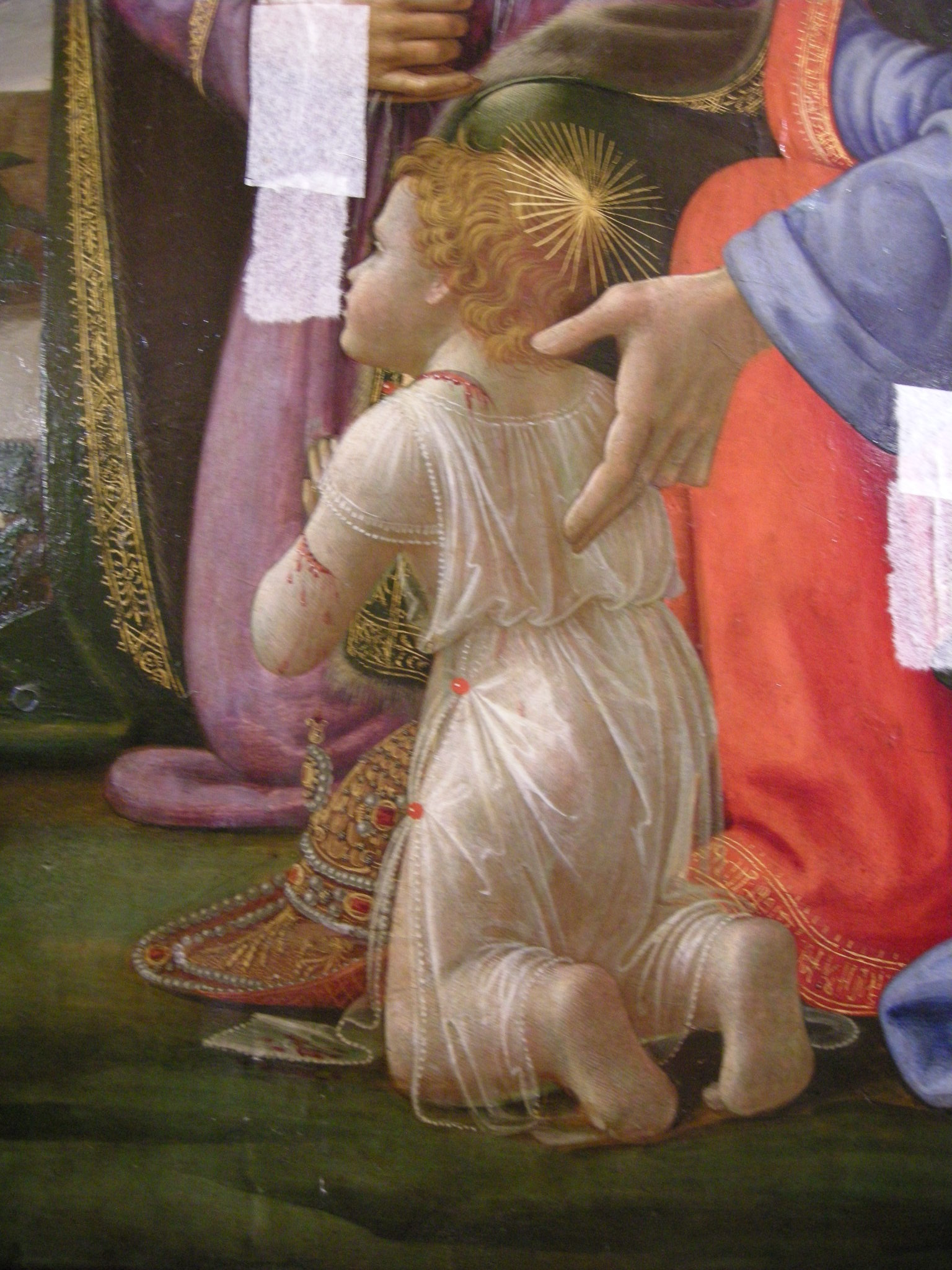
Detail of one of the innocenti.

The original frame, commissioned in 1486 to Antonio di Francesco di Bartolo after a design by Giuliano da Sangallo, was destroyed in 1786 when the interior of the church was renewed and the altarpiece removed. It was moved to the hospital's art gallery in 1917, being joined by the original predella (which had been separated in 1615) in 1971.

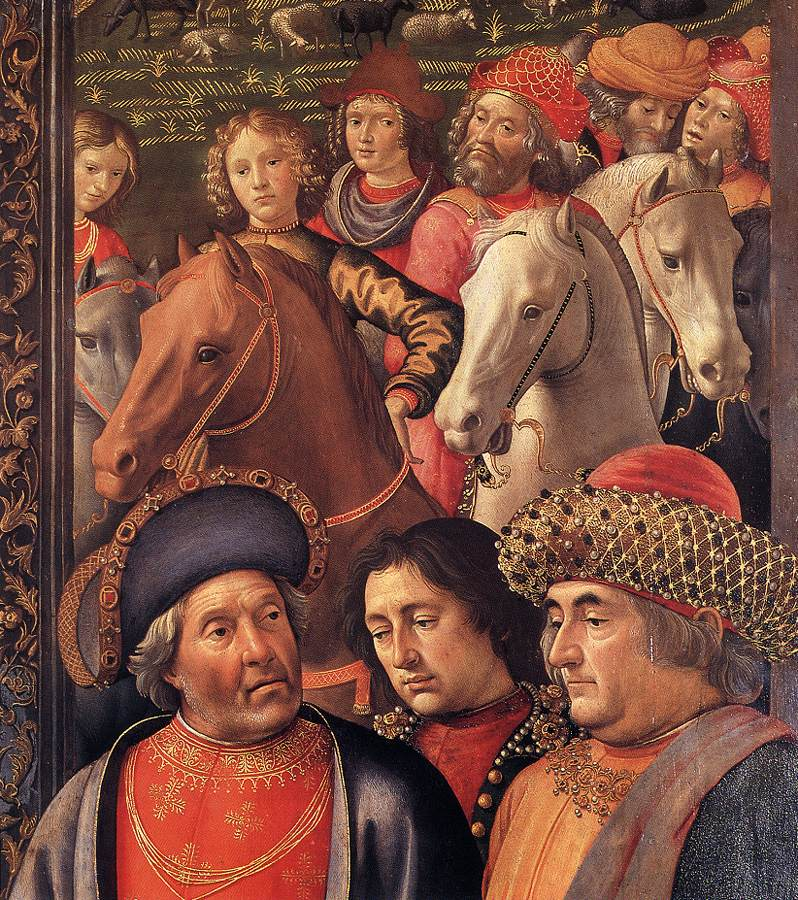
Detail of the portraits on the right.

== Description ==
This scene of the Adoration of the Magi expands upon earlier innovations by Sandro Botticelli's Adoration of the Magi of Santa Maria Novella (c. 1475) and Leonardo da Vinci's Adoration of the Magi (1481–1482). The Madonna occupies a central position inside a pyramidal composition. The Child is held up to be seen by the Magi and the other spectators. Two Magi are positioned at the base of the composition; one kisses the child's foot, and another kneels with his hand on his chest. A third Magus stands on the left, wearing a yellow and red cloak, gifting a richly decorated chalice. According to the tradition, they represent three different ages of man: youth, maturity and old age. At their sides, crouched, are St. John the Baptist, who looks at the viewer and (in keeping with the contemporary theme) points to the Child; and St. John the Evangelist, who is presenting a wounded child. Another child, in a hint to the orphans (innocenti) cared by the Hospital, is at the opposite end. They are also referred to by the scene of the Massacre of the Innocents represented in the left background.

The traditional ox and donkey surround the Virgin, together with St. Joseph. The hut includes an unfinished brick wall, a symbol of the decline of paganism, to be replaced by Christianity. The ceiling is supported by four columns decorated with candelabra and gilt Corinthian capitals. Above it, four angels hold a cartouche with a tetragram with the notes and the first words of the Gloria.

Ghirlandaio painted in the left foreground a series of characters, among which are the donor (dressing in black), and the artist himself, who looks towards the viewer. On the right, in the Magi procession, are three richly donned men, which have been identified as major members of the Arte della Seta (Guild of the Silk Workers), the main financial backer of the Hospital. Above them, the procession continues in the far background, passing under an arch (with the date, MCCCCLXXXVIII, or 1488) another possible symbol of the fall of the transition between paganism and Christianity. The five horses were painted starting from only two cartoons, adding some small variants in the heads. The same sector of the background depicts the annunciation to the shepherds by a flying angel. Finally, painted above a lake landscape with ships among hills and mountains, a layman and a clerk observe the scene: they symbolize the main institutions backing the orphanage.

The city in the left background is a symbolic representation of Rome: edifices include the Colosseum, Trajan's Column, the Torre delle Milizie and the Pyramid of Cestius.

=== Predella ===
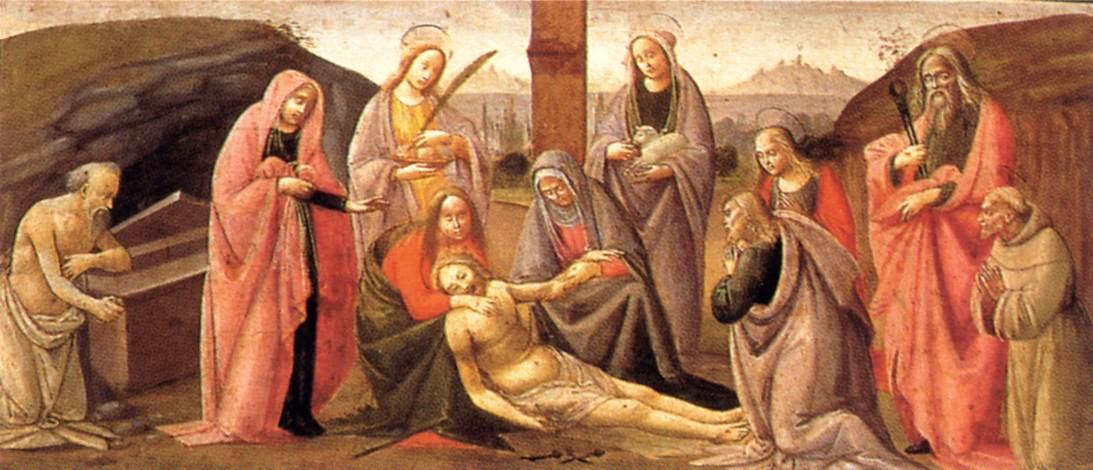
Deposition from the Cross (tempera on wood, 1488): one of the predella's scenes by Bartolomeo di Giovanni

The predella, painted by Bartolomeo di Giovanni, includes episodes of the lives of the saints and of the Virgin. They are, from left:

- Martyrdom of St. John the Evangelist
- Annunciation
- Marriage of the Virgin
- Presentation in the Temple and Circumcision of Jesus
- Deposition from the Cross
- Baptism of Christ
- Saint Antoninus Consecrating the church of Santa Maria degli Innocenti
