= Medici Madonna (van der Weyden) =

Painting by Rogier van der Weyden

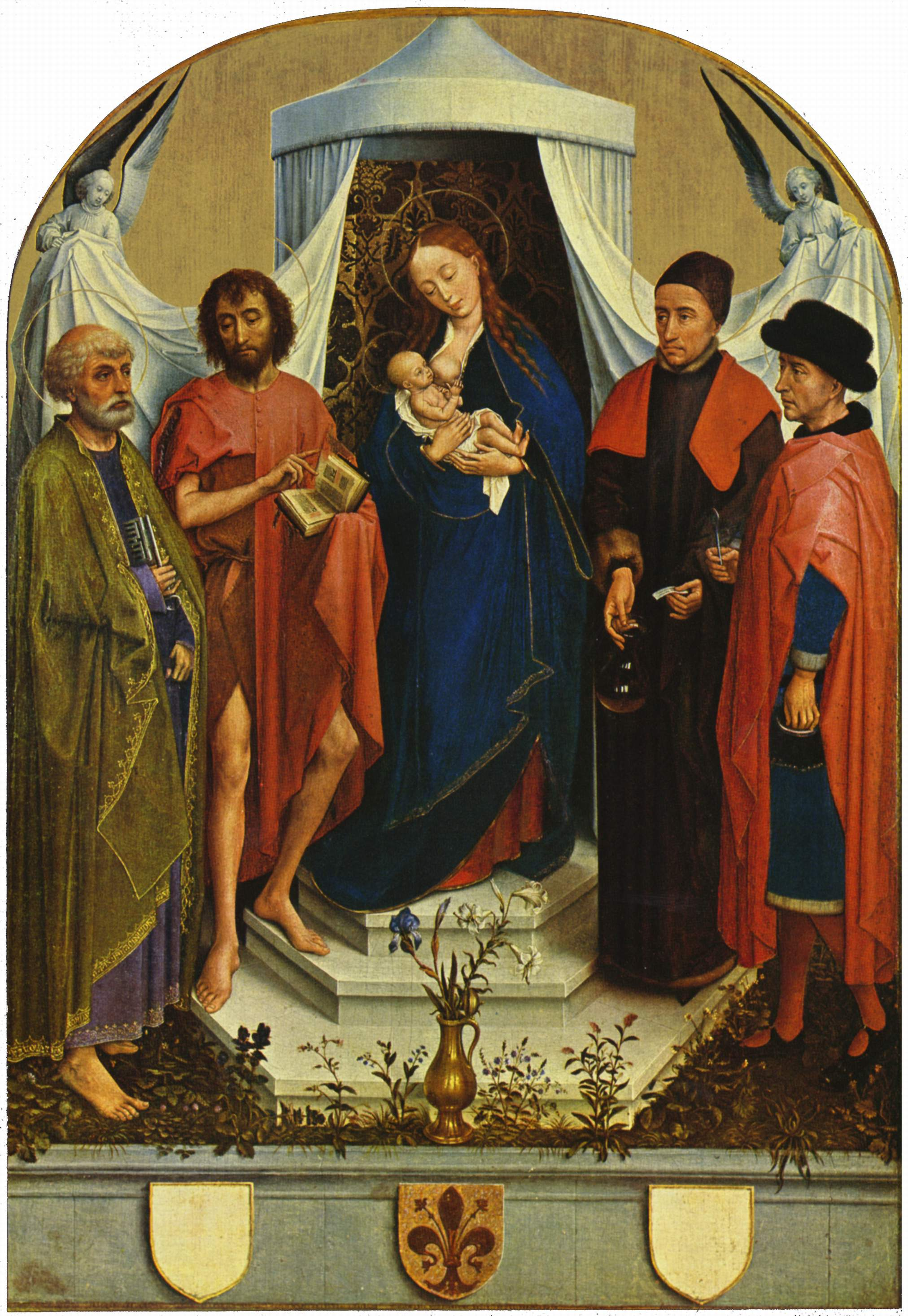
- Artist: Rogier van der Weyden
- Year: c. 1460–1464
- Type: Oil on panel
- Dimensions: 61.7 cm × 46.1 cm (24.3 in × 18.1 in)
- Location: Städel, Frankfurt

The Medici Madonna is an oil-on-panel painting by the Netherlandish artist Rogier van der Weyden, dating from around 1460–1464 and housed in the Städel, Frankfurt, Germany.

The work is known to have been commissioned by the Medici family in Florence, as testified by the Florentine coat of arms with a red lily at the center of the lower step. The work has been variously dated from 1450 to 1451, when the artist travelled to Rome visiting several Italian courts, or from 1460 to 1464, the same years of the Lamentation of Christ, inspired by Beato Angelico and now at the Uffizi.

== Description ==
Within a gold ground for the sky, van der Weyden painted a baldachin lined with precious damask cloth, under which are the Virgin with Child, St. Peter, St. John the Baptist (patron saint of Florence), St. Cosmas (a protector of the House of Medici), and St. Damian. Cosmas is portrayed while putting a coin in a handbag hanging from his belt, a reference of his legend, according to which he had accepted a small sum for a medical performance, causing rage in his brother Damian.

In the foreground is a still life with the artist's typical attention to natural details. In the centre is a gilt metallic amphora, in which are several lilies: the white ones symbolize the Virgin's purity, while the red ones are another reference to Florence.

== See also ==
- List of works by Rogier van der Weyden

== Sources ==
- Campbell, Lorne (2004). Van der Weyden. London: Chaucer Press. ISBN 1-904449-24-7.
- Weyden, Rogier van der. "Medici Madonna". Digital Collection.
