= Adoration of the Magi (Filippino Lippi) =

Painting by Filippino Lippi in the Uffizi

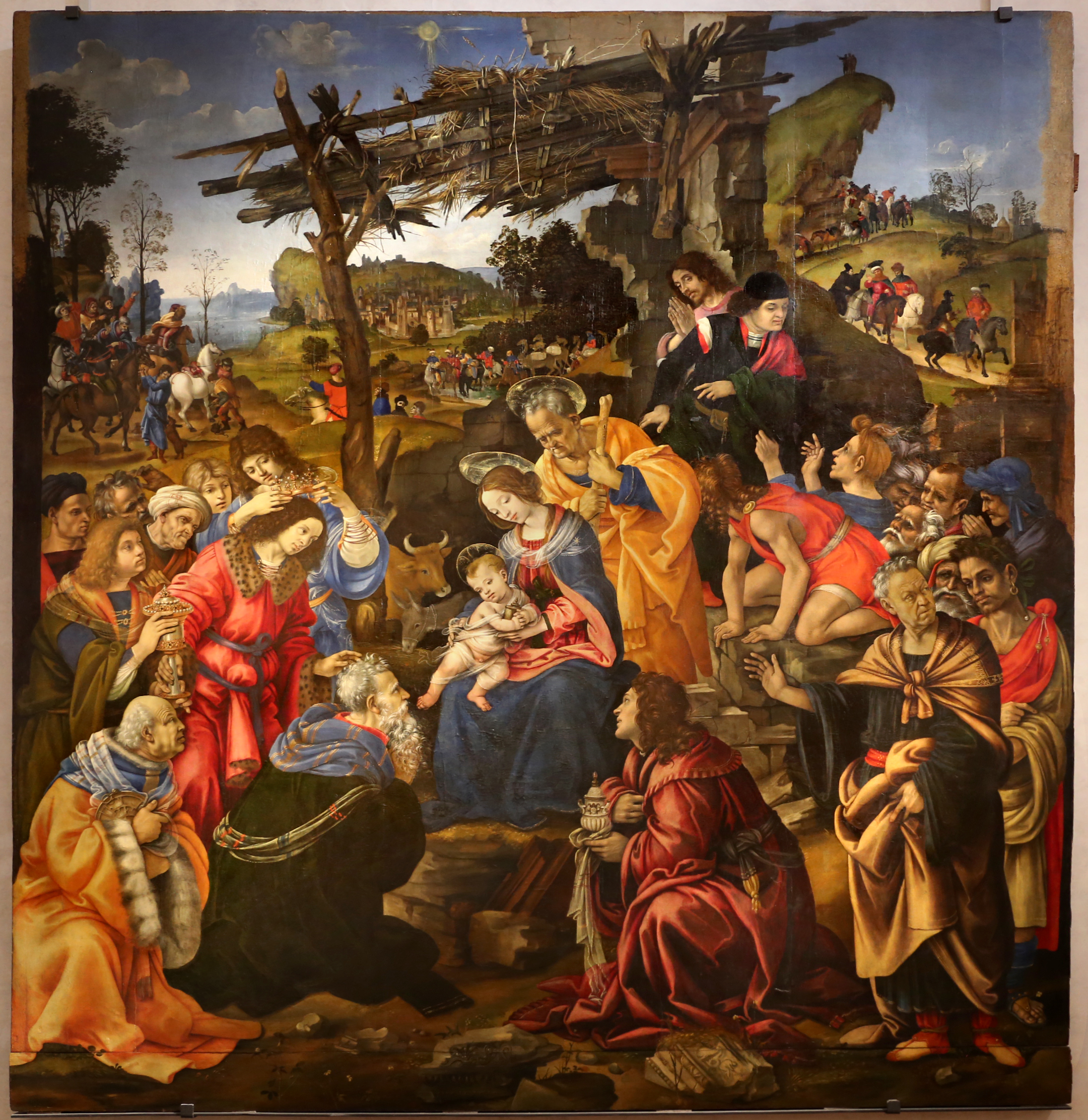
- Inscription on back: Filippus me pinsit de Lipis florentinus addi 29 di marzo 1496
- Artist: Filippino Lippi
- Year: 1496
- Medium: Tempera grassa on wood
- Dimensions: 258 cm × 243 cm (102 in × 96 in)
- Location: The Uffizi
- Accession: 1890 n. 1566
- Website: https://www.uffizi.it/en/artworks/adoration-of-the-magi-filippino-lippi

The Adoration of the Magi is a panel painting in tempera by the Italian Renaissance painter Filippino Lippi, of the very common subject of the Adoration of the Magi, signed and dated 1496. It is now in the Galleria degli Uffizi in Florence.

The panel was painted for the monastery of San Donato in Scopeto (San Donato in Scopeto), as a substitution for the one commissioned in 1481 from Leonardo da Vinci, who left it unfinished. In 1529 it was acquired by Cardinal Carlo de' Medici and in 1666 it became part of the Uffizi collection, left to the city by the last of the Medicis.

Filippino Lippi followed Leonardo's setting, in particular in the central part of the work. Much of its inspiration was clearly derived from Botticelli's Adoration of the Magi, also in the Uffizi: this is evident in the disposition of the characters on the two sides, with the Holy Family portrayed in the centre under. Similarly to Botticelli's work, Filippino also portrayed numerous members of the Medici cadet line, who had adhered to the Savonarolian Republic in the period in which the work was executed. On the left, kneeling in a luxurious, fur-lined yellow robe and holding an astrolabe, is Pierfrancesco de' Medici, who had died 20 years before. Behind him, standing, are his two sons Giovanni, holding a goblet, and Lorenzo, from whom a page is removing a crown.

The general style is that of Filippino's late career, characterized by a greater care to details and by a nervous rhythm in the forms, influenced by the knowledge of foreign painting schools (as also in the landscape of the background). The painting is set in a country landscape, in front of a stable over which the Star of Bethlehem, that guided the Three Magi, is shining. In the background, there are scenes of their journey, from the sighting of the star to their passage via Herod's palace.

== Patron and commission ==
The painting is signed and dated ("Filippus me pinsit de Lipis florentinus addi 29 di marzo 1496"). Originally, the subject was commissioned by the monks of the monastery of San Donato in Scopeto in Florence, and begun by Leonardo da Vinci in 1481. The Augustinian monks at the church of San Donato in Scopeto wanted Leonardo to paint a panel for the high altar in the church. In 1481, Leonardo abandoned his work on the painting, because he was called to the court of Ludovico Sforza in Milan. Leonardo's abandoned work survives today at the Uffizi, but not in the best shape or form. The Augustinian monks still wanted the painting for their church and they waited for Leonardo's return. Eventually they decided to find another artist to do the job, and chose Filippino Lippi. This is not the first time that Leonardo and Filippino exchanged works. For example, in the 1480s Leonardo had to give over the designing of the altarpiece for the Palazzo della Signoria to Filippino Lippi, who completed the artwork in 1486.

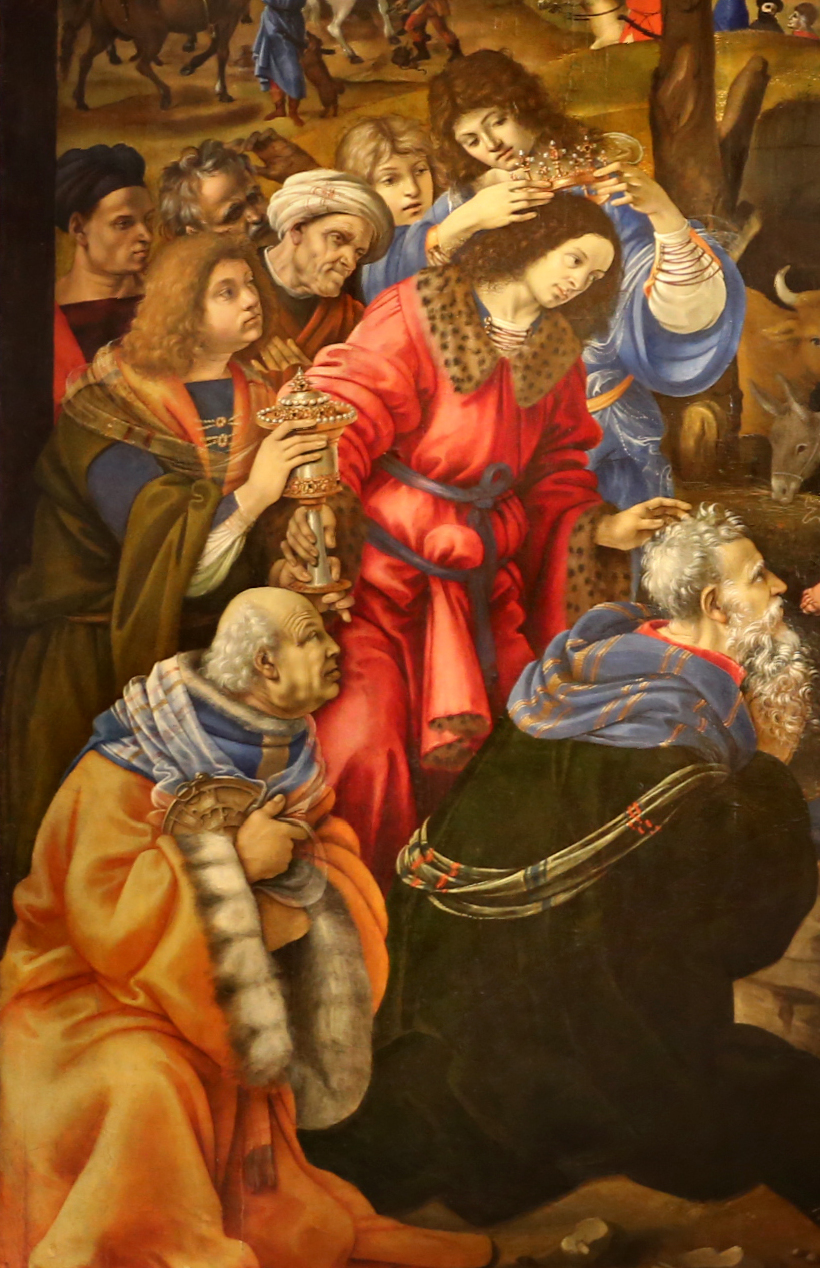
Fig 1:Brown robe (left)- Lorenzo's page, Yellow robe- Pierfrancesco de'Medici, Red robe- Lorenzo de'Medici

The reason for Leonardo's abandonment of the Signoria altarpiece remains unclear. Later on in 1505 Leonardo abandoned another artwork, a wall painting of the Battle of Anghiari, in the Palazzo della Signoria, where the Gonfaloniere of Justice, Piero Soderini, claims that Leonardo may have been sent to Milan by the request of Charles d'Amboise and King Louis XII. Although it is unclear why Leonardo abandoned the commission of the Adoration of the Magi, it would be reasonable to assume that he had been called away to another job, resulting in him abandoning his work in the palazzo. Based on their prior interactions, Leonardo instructed his father to give drafts of the Adoration to Filippino. Filippino Lippi started working on the painting soon after receiving the commission to paint the Adoration of the Magi. He is believed to have received the commission in the early 1494, but began painting in November.

Filippino's father, Filippo Lippi, also created a version of the Adoration of the Magi, as had most successful painters of religious subject in the period.

== Description and subject ==
The figures surrounding the Virgin represent the three Biblical Magi and their entourages, but some are believed to be donor portraits depicting members of the Medici family. The Holy Family is located in the centre of the painting, flanked by Medici family members. The three Magi kneel in the foreground. In order to pay homage to Pierfrancesco de' Medici, and his sons, the Augustinian monks of San Donato in Scopeto commissioned a painting from Leonardo da Vinci in 1481 (discussed in above section, see: Patron and Commission). Although Leonardo abandoned his work, the Augustinian monks required Filippino Lippi to include the same figures.

Lippi included portraits of three members of the Medici family. For instance, in the bottom left corner of the painting there is a man wearing a golden cloak, lined with fur. As he kneels before the Christ-child, he is seen holding a large golden astrolabe. Several scholars have suggested that this figure may the represent Melchior the oldest of the Magi, as a portrait of Pierfrancesco de' Medici, though the item he holds is not the typical gift that the Magi present to the Christ-Child, gold. Bleattler does not go on to discuss any portrait identity of the remaining two Magi in the painting, or other figures.

Above Pierfrancesco in the golden cloak, there are two male figures who Jonathan K. Nelson believes represent Pierfrancesco's sons, Lorenzo di Pierfrancesco de' Medici (1463–1503), shown being crowned and serves as the youngest of the Magi, Caspar, and his brother, Giovanni de' Medici (1467–1498), serves as a page. Giovanni, together with his older brother, holds a large gold and silver vessel lidded goblet, to give to baby Jesus. With this interpretation, one Magi, the middle one, remains unaccounted for still. He may be either of the two remaining men kneeling in the foreground.

Based on the figures represented, it makes more sense that the male figure kneeling before the Christi-child (in a black clock with a blue scarf) is presumably the oldest Magi, Melchoir (notice how he has already given his gift and Jesus is seen holding it). If this is the case, perhaps then Pierfrancesco would be the middle aged magus, Balthazar. The youngest Magus, Caspar, could either be the figure in red, Lorenzo, or perhaps, is the man kneeling on the right, who is extending his gift to the Holy Family. Traditionally, the three magi are depicted kneeling in artwork, which makes this a valid and logical assumption for labeling the Magi.

=== Christian Ethiopians and ideas of the Orient ===
During Filippino Lippi's life, new artwork increasingly contained elements of the Orient. In 1441 during the Council of Florence, four Ethiopian monks were present, who attested that their ruler controlled a Christian kingdom in Ethiopia larger than all of Europe. The Europeans were intrigued by this large Christian kingdom and drew connections with their prior knowledge of the mythical figure of Prester John. This motivated European artists, especially those of the Italian Renaissance, to increasingly include dark skinned figures in kings in the Adoration of the Magi. This is seen when examining the multitude of scenes of the Adoration of the Magi that were painted in this period. Many of the paintings include oriental carpets and halos with pseudo-Arabic script. Contrary to this popular movement, Lippi did not include oriental objects like carpets in his painting of the Adoration of the Magi. However, Lippi included Muslim men who are seen wearing turbans on the sides of the painting.

Unlike some other depictions of The Adoration of the Magi in Italian Renaissance painting where one of the Magi, Balthazar was sometimes depicted with dark skin, Filippino Lippi shows all three of the Magi as white men. However, he includes one African in the bottom right corner of the painting; this figure is not a king or attendant. Scholars have suggested that this Black man is supposed to symbolize the first of the gentiles who chose Christianity as their religion. The number of Africans who accepted Christ is discussed by Saint Augustine's epiphany sermons. Although it is difficult to pinpoint the reason as to why Lippi chose to do this, the trend is seen in similar Italian Renaissance art during the 1490s where an increasing amount of Africans, specifically Ethiopian Christians are included into the biblical scene of the Adoration of the Magi, in order to show that dark skinned people were also supporters of Christ. This is contrary to the standard depiction of dark skinned individuals as Balthazar the magus, servants, or enslaved peoples.

== Style ==
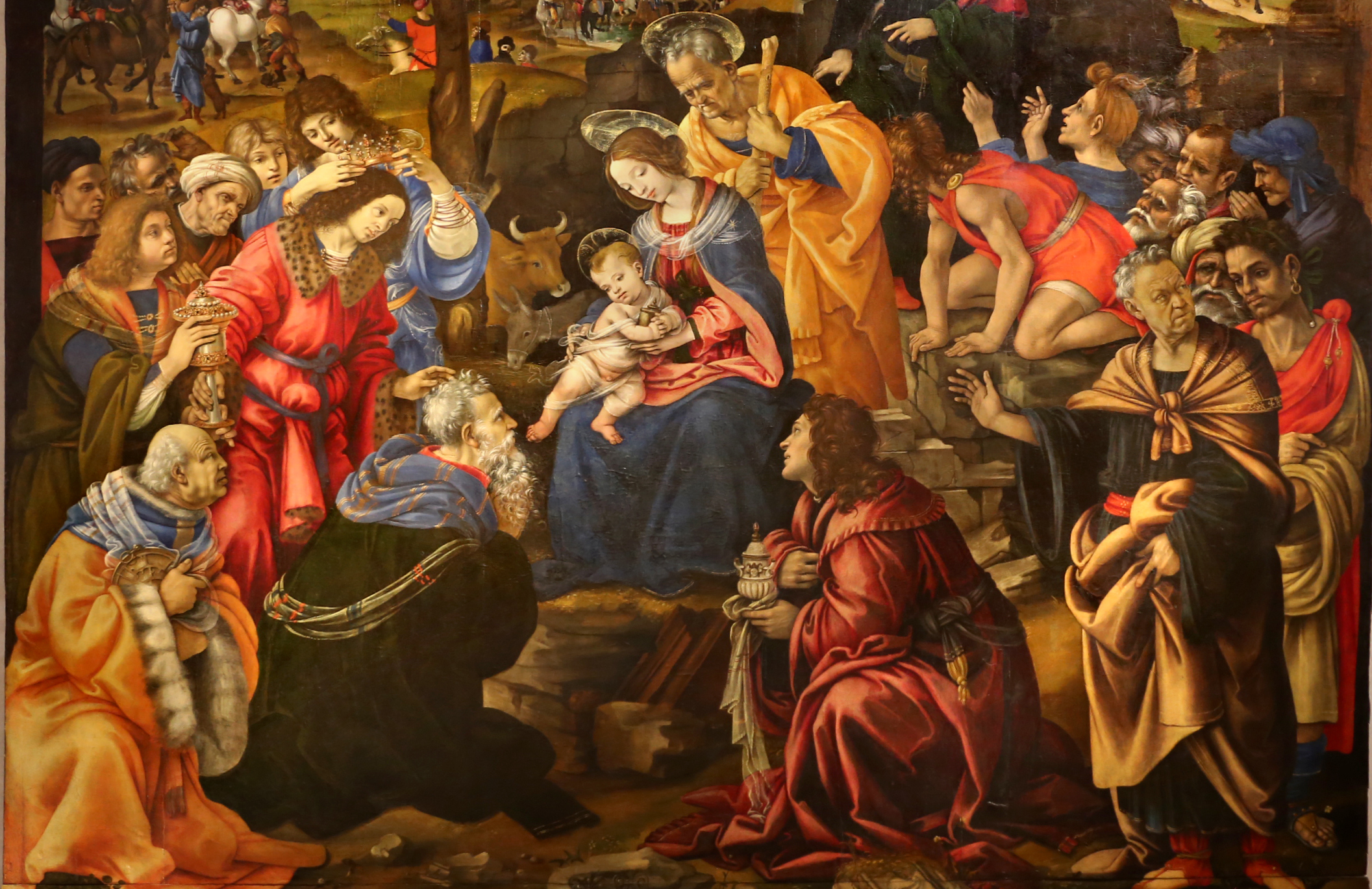
Fig 2: Close up of pyramidal structure of the key figures

The general style of this painting is similar to Botticelli's Adoration of the Magi of 1475, which also shows great attention to details and extravagant use of colours. Lippi also used gold paint to highlight the concept of heavenly light and golden rays. He uses bright colours and gold to grab and direct the viewer's attention. The bright golden rays serve the purpose of as narrative pointers, a sign of divine presence, and spiritual energy.

Lippi arranged the scene in a pyramidal shape. He placed the Virgin and Child at the apex of the pyramid, with the other figures surrounding them. He painted a sense of movement, emotion, and physiognomic types that animates the entire scene. Lippi's use of a pyramidal structure is similar to that of both Leonardo da Vinci and Sandro Botticelli, as well as other Italian Renaissance painters at the time. Lippi is also note for his use of warm colours in his paintings. These qualities are seen in his Adoration of the Magi, as well as other paintings by Lippi, including Tobias and the Angel and the Adoration of the Kings. Furthermore, Lippi creates an extremely vivid and naturalistic landscape in his artworks.

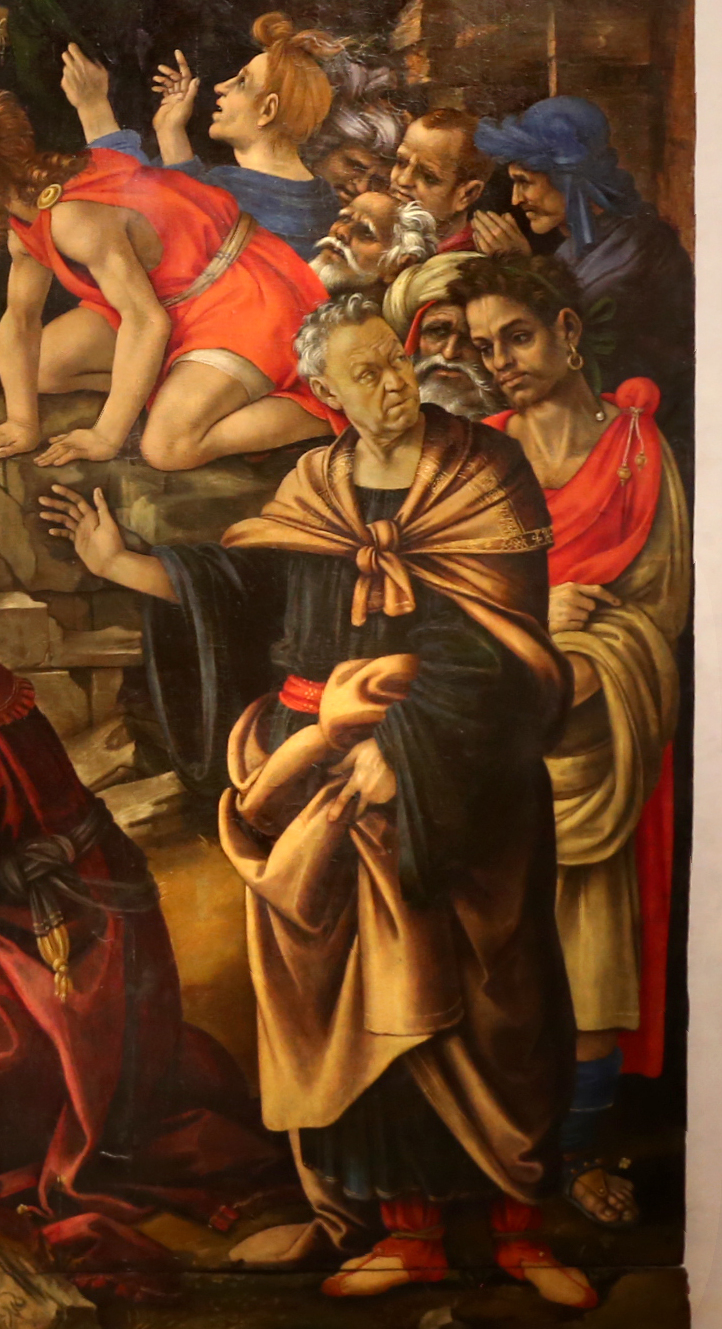
Fig 3: Close up of African man and man with tiraz cloak

The man with the brown cloak, holding his right hand up, has tiraz artwork on his cloak. The Medici family on the left wears a cloak that also resembles tiraz artwork. This style of art comes from Islamic countries. The Adoration of the Magi by Gentile da Fabriano also takes advantage of using tiraz in his painting. Filippino including this in his painting shows how trade has connected different cultures, artistically and economically, as well as his knowledge and admiration of foreign artworks. The dark man next to him is seen with a golden earring and pearl on his neck. Most commonly, the use of earring in Italian Renaissance artwork was to depict 'the other'. Poggio Bracciolini has claimed Africans, namely Ethiopians, decorated themselves with more gems and gold than Italians. Filippino Lippi must have used other paintings and heard Bracciolini's stories to include these details. A person looking at this painting would be immediately able to distinguish who is European, and who is not.

== The artist ==
Filippino Lippi was a prominent Italian painter of the Quattrocento (15th century) and a mentor to many artists, including Sandro Botticelli. He was born around 1457, in Prato, Tuscany, his father Fra Filippo Lippi; broken his clerical vows, and after Filippino's birth he received a papal dispensation to marry Lucrezia Buti. Filippino initially received training in his father's workshop. He returned to Florence sometime between 1491 and 1494. Initially training under his father Fra Filippo Lippi, Filippino Lippi later apprenticed with Botticelli after his father's death. Renowned for his energetic and intricate compositions, warm color palettes, and naturalistic depictions of landscapes, Filippino Lippi contributed to numerous fresco cycles in the chapels of Florence and Rome and also created panel paintings.

Works of this period include: Apparition of Christ to the Virgin, Adoration of the Magi, Sacrifice of Laocoön, St. John Baptist and Maddalena (inspired by Luca Signorelli's works).

On 18 April 1504 Filippino died at the age of 47; his cause of death is disputed. all the workshops in the city closed in his honor.
