= Alfred Ernest Allnatt =

English businessman

Alfred E. Allnatt
- Born: Alfred Ernest Allnatt; 19 February 1889; Bearwood House, Berkshire, England
- Died: 1969 (aged 79–80); Doughty House, Richmond Hill, Surrey, England
- Occupation: Businessman

Alfred Ernest Allnatt (19 February 1889 – 14 August 1969), known professionally as Major A. E. Allnatt, was an English businessman and art collector. He took over his father's supply business and developed it into Allnatt London Properties and other well-known businesses in England.

== Biography ==
He was the third son of John Edward Allnatt, of Sindlesham, Berkshire. He was educated at Newbury Grammar School and University College, Reading. In 1911 he was commissioned in the Royal Inniskilling Fusiliers.

For his services in the First World War he was awarded the MBE in the 1919 Birthday Honours. He resigned his commission in December 1920 and was granted the rank of Major.

The Callard and Bowser business was sold to Allnatt in 1933. The company was acquired by Arthur Guinness & Sons in 1951 but Allnatt kept his position as chairman.

Allnatt purchased Peter Paul Rubens' 1633–34 painting Adoration of the Magi for a record £275,000 in 1959 from the estate of the Duke of Westminster. Allnatt gave the painting to King's College, Cambridge, in November 1961, and the painting was placed on permanent display in 1968 as the altarpiece in the east end of King's College Chapel. He acquired in 1961 Caravaggio's Salome with the Head of John the Baptist (c. 1607) which he lent to the National Gallery in London; the Gallery purchased it from Allnatt's estate. He also owned the Allnatt Diamond, which he purchased in the early 1950s.

Allnatt enjoyed horse racing. A horse named Ujiji owned by Allnatt finished third in the Derby in June 1942 and first in the Gold Cup in 1943 at Newmarket Racecourse.

In 1962, Allnatt established the Chase Charity, which in 2004 merged to become Lankelly Chase.

Sandbrook was purchased by John and Mary Allnatt, whose herd of Blonde d'Aquitaine cattle was among the top prize winners at agricultural shows throughout Britain and Ireland, including the Royal Dublin Society Spring Show, the Royal Welsh Show, and the Royal Ulster Show. In the 1960s, Mrs. Allnatt purchased Rathmore Park for her son from her first marriage, Brendan Foody; but after he had decided not to return to live in Ireland, Rathmore was sold. He inherited Sandbrook following his mother's death in September 1987.

He and Melvin Leroy Merritt of Portland, Oregon, United States, researched and published a genealogy book of the Allnatt history, The Families of Allnutt & Allnatt, in 1962.

Allnatt died at his residence Doughty House in Richmond Hill, Surrey. His ashes were buried in the churchyard of St Mary the Virgin, Turville, Buckinghamshire.
