= Lankelly Chase =

British charitable foundation

Lankelly Chase Foundation
- Predecessor: Chase Charity, Lankelly Foundation
- Formation: 1962
- Founder: Alfred Ernest Allnatt, Ron Diggens
- Headquarters: London
- Chief Executive: Julian Corner
- Website: lankellychase.org.uk

Lankelly Chase is a British charitable foundation. Founded in 1962, it announced a five-year-plan to distribute all assets and close up operations starting in 2023.

== Description and history ==
Lankelly Chase is a British charitable foundation. The organisation was initially founded as Chase Charity in 1962 by Alfred Allnatt with the ambition of refurbishing a Richmond Hill art gallery. After a disagreement with the owner of the art gallery, the organization changed direction towards grant-making. Chase Charity merged with the Lankelly Foundation (established by Ron Diggens in 1968) in November 2004.

The foundation is based in London, England. Since 2011, the chief executive officer has been Julian Corner.

In 2021, the organisation was the United Kingdom's 79th largest charitable foundation by funds disbursed.

== Contemporary activities ==
In 2018, in collaboration with New Philanthropy Capitol, Lankelly Chase published the report Thinking Big: How To Use Theory Of Change For Systems Change. The report was critical of how UK charities failed to address root causes of poverty, favouring quick fixes of the symptoms.

Prior to 2023, Lankelly Chase distributed about £13 million per year to several hundred charities that worked on racial justice, social justice and climate justice. Funding is supported by drawing from a £130 million endowment.

On July 10, 2023, the foundation announced that it would spend the next five years closing up operations and distribute all its assets. The governing board of the organisation had concluded that philanthropic giving was a "function of colonial capitalism.” Via its website, the foundation stated:

“We have recognised the gravity of the interlocking social, climate and economic global crises we are experiencing today. At the same time, we view the traditional philanthropy model as so entangled with colonial capitalism that it inevitably continues the harms of the past into the present.

“We acknowledge our role in maintaining this traditional model and know that these times demand bold action from us all in charitable organisations. This is our response.”

£8 million of the giveaway is planned to go to the Baobab Foundation.
