= Adoration of the Magi (Leonardo) =

Unfinished painting by Leonardo da Vinci

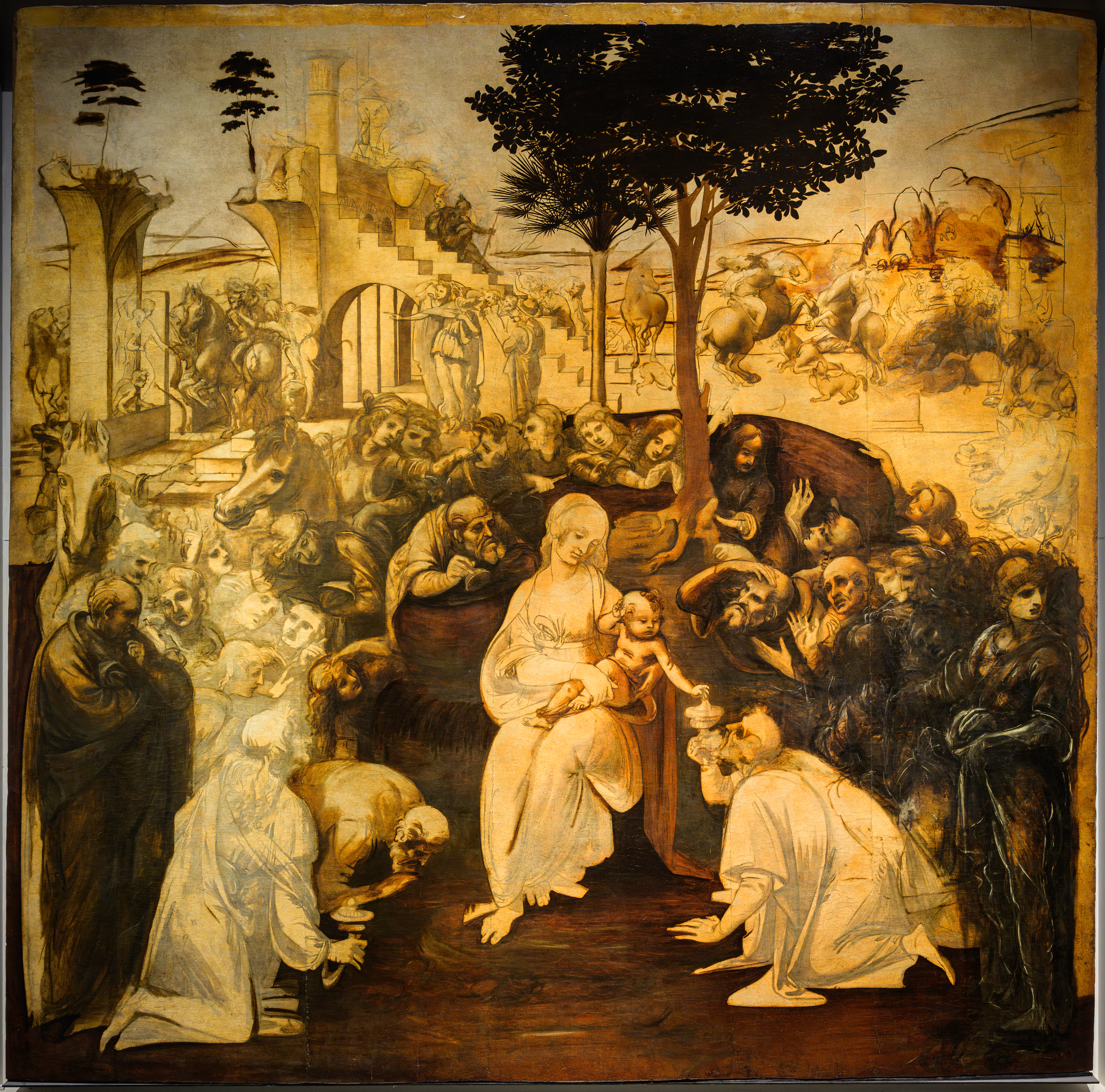
- Artist: Leonardo da Vinci
- Year: 1481
- Type: drawing
- Medium: charcoal, ink, watercolor and oil paint on wood
- Dimensions: 246 cm × 243 cm (97 in × 96 in)
- Location: Uffizi; Florence

The Adoration of the Magi is an unfinished early painting by the Italian Renaissance artist Leonardo da Vinci. Leonardo was given the commission by the Augustinian monks of San Donato in Scopeto in Florence in 1481, but he departed for Milan the following year, leaving merely more than the preparatory underdrawing in charcoal, ink and watercolor. It has been in the Uffizi Gallery in Florence since 1670.

== Description ==
The Virgin Mary and Child are depicted in the foreground and form a triangular shape with the Magi kneeling in adoration. Behind them is a semicircle of accompanying figures, including what may be a self-portrait of the young Leonardo (on the far right). In the background on the left is the ruin of a pagan building, on which workmen can be seen, apparently repairing it. On the right are men on horseback fighting and a sketch of a rocky landscape.

The ruins are a possible reference to the Basilica of Maxentius, which, according to medieval legend, the Romans claimed would stand until a virgin gave birth. It is supposed to have collapsed on the night of Christ's birth. (In fact it was not even built until a later date.) The ruins dominate a preparatory perspective drawing by Leonardo, which also includes the fighting horsemen. The palm tree in the center has associations with the Virgin Mary, partly due to the phrase "You are stately as a palm tree" from the Song of Solomon, which is believed to prefigure her. Another aspect of the palm tree can be the usage of the palm tree as a symbol of victory for ancient Rome, whereas in Christianity it is a representation of martyrdom—triumph over death—so in conclusion we can say that the palm, in general, represents triumph. The other tree in the painting is from the carob family; the seeds from this tree are used as a unit of measurement for valuable stones and jewels. It is therefore associated with crowns, suggesting Christ as the king of kings or the Virgin as the future queen of heaven, as well as that this is nature's gift to the newborn Christ. As with Michelangelo's Doni Tondo, the background is probably supposed to represent the Pagan world supplanted by the Christian world, inaugurated by the events in the foreground. On the right side, the most credible self-portrait of Leonardo da Vinci as a 30-year-old can be seen, according to several critics.

Much of the composition of this painting was influenced by an earlier work of the Flemish artist Rogier van der Weyden. The relationship between figures, space and the viewer's standpoint, the high horizon, slightly raised viewpoint, space receding into the far distance, and a central figural group poised before a rock formation in the middle of the landscape are all copied from van der Weyden's Entombment of Christ (1460, Uffizi).

== Related works ==
Several preparatory drawings for the work by Leonardo survived in the Uffizi, the Louvre, Paris, the Wallraf-Richartz Museum, Cologne, and Fitzwilliam Museum in Cambridge.

Owing to the painting's unfinished status in 1481, the commission was handed over to Filippino Lippi, who painted another Adoration of the Magi, completed in 1496, in substitution of the one commissioned to Leonardo. It is also housed in the Uffizi.

Domenico Ghirlandaio completed a painting of the same theme for the Ospedale degli Innocenti in 1488, expanding upon Leonardo's composition.

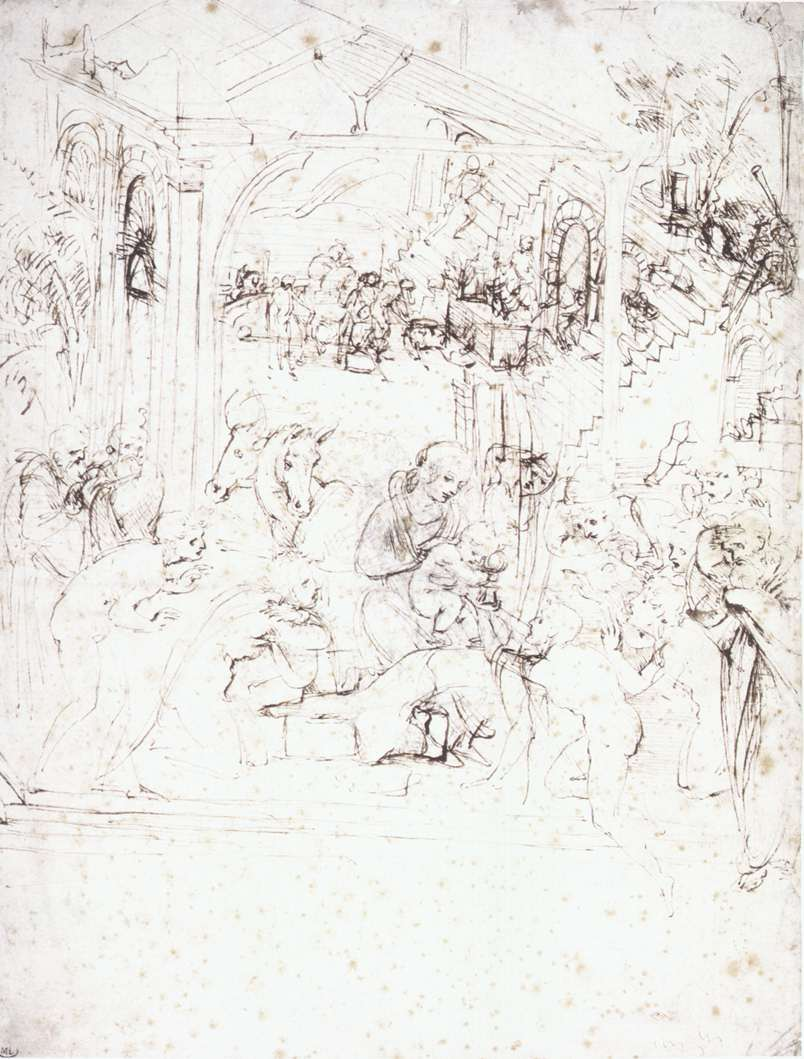
Study for The Adoration of the Magi, 1478–1481, Louvre, Paris

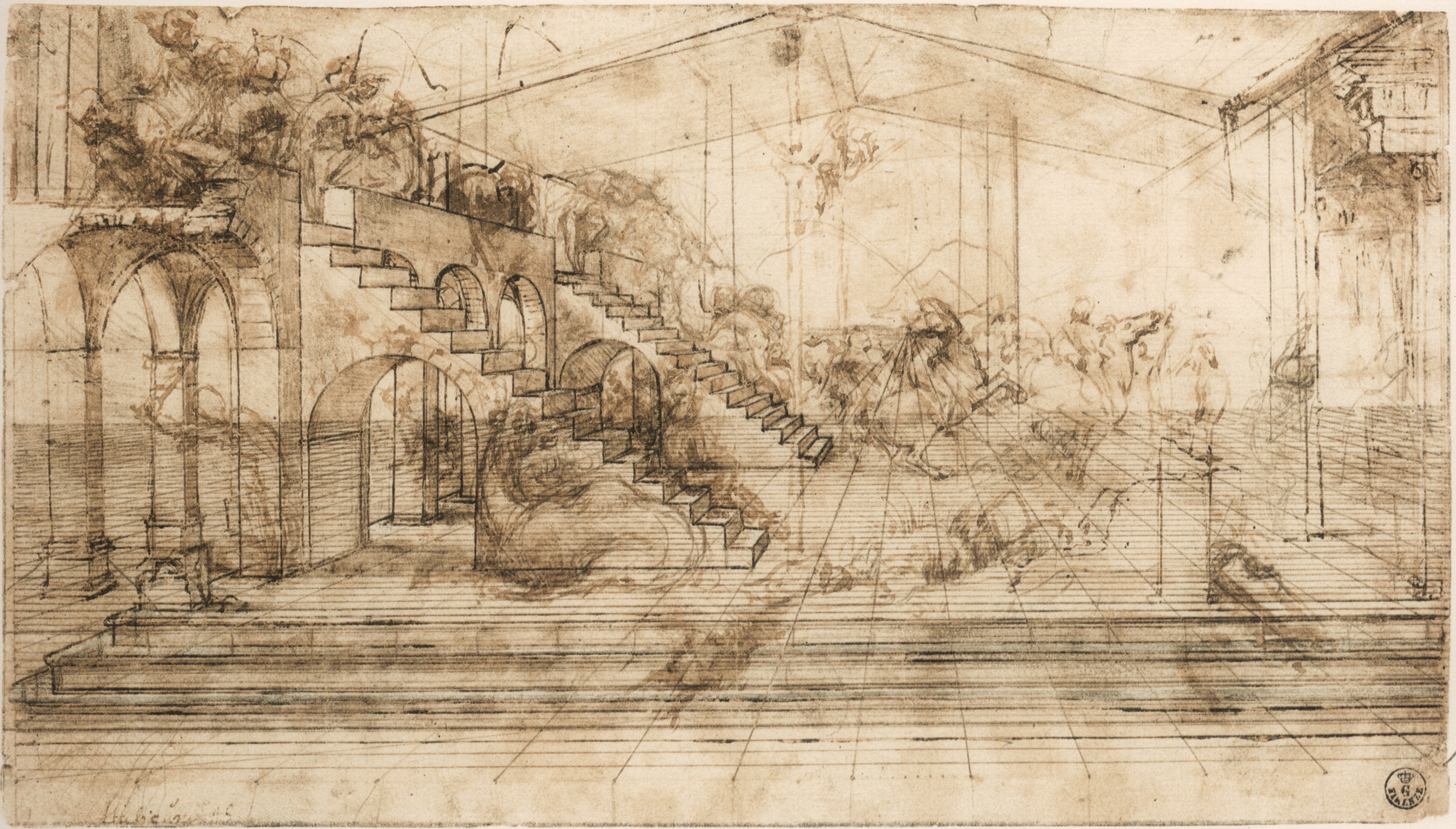
Perspectival study for The Adoration of the Magi, c. 1481, Uffizi, Florence

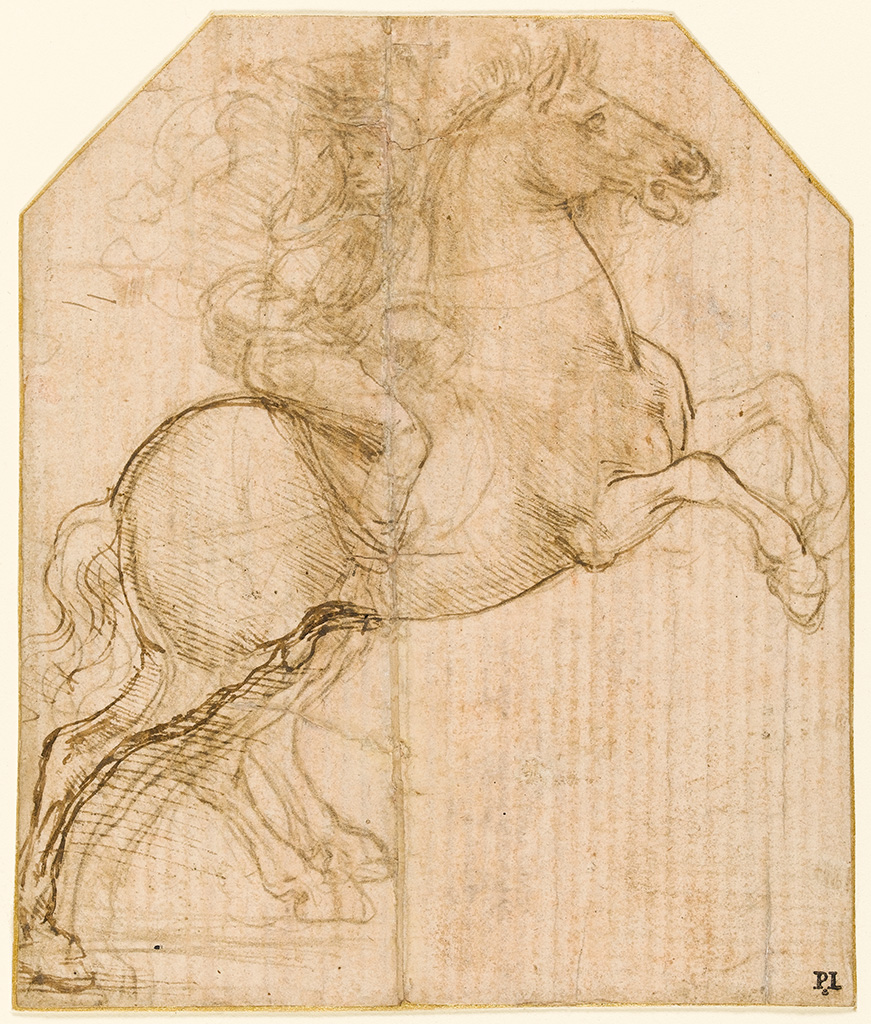
Study of a rider and rearing horse for The Adoration of the Magi, c. 1481, Fitzwilliam Museum, Cambridge

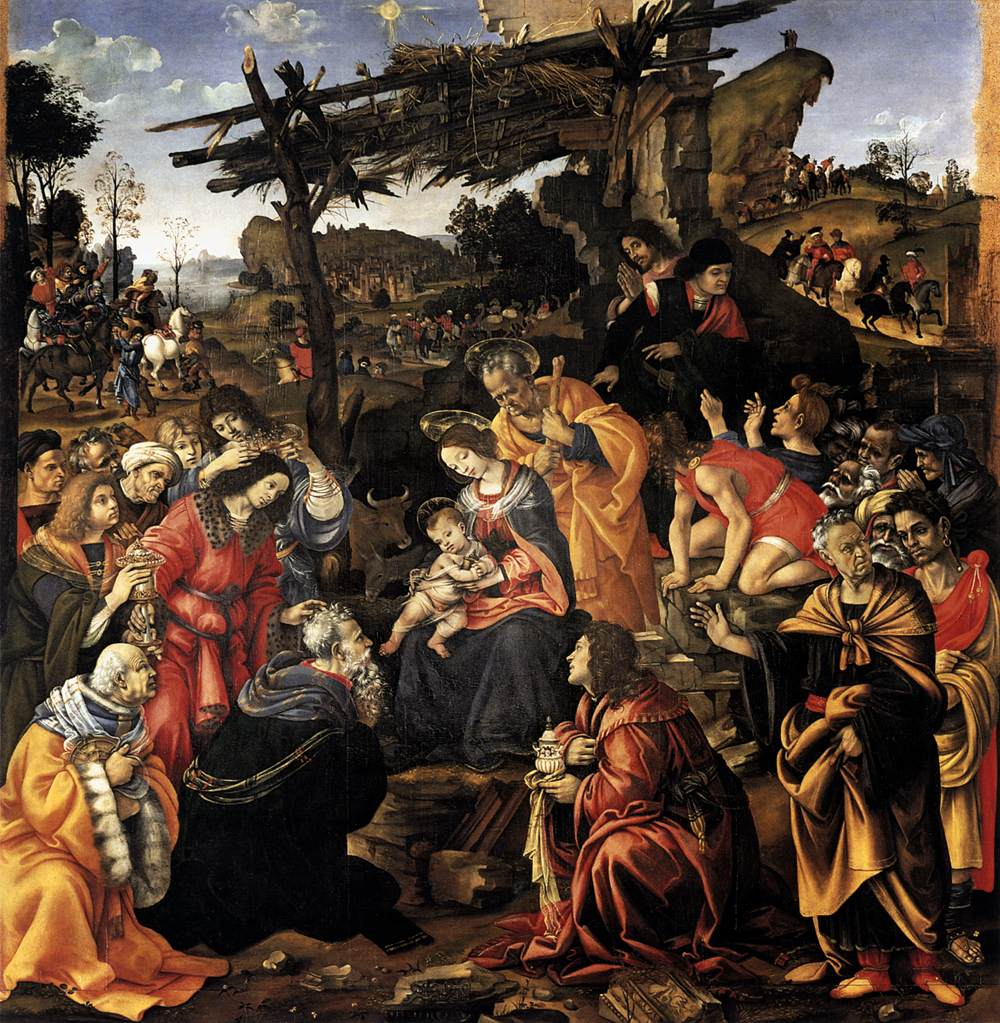
Filippino Lippi, Adoration of the Magi, 1496 – The altarpiece eventually delivered to San Donato a Scopeto

== Diagnostic survey ==
In 2002 Maurizio Seracini, an art diagnostician alumnus of the University of California, San Diego, and a native Florentine, was commissioned by the Uffizi to undertake a study of the paint surface to determine whether the painting could be restored without damaging it. Seracini, who heads Editech, a Florence-based company he founded in 1977 focused on the "diagnostics of cultural heritage", used high-resolution digital scans as well as thermographic, ultrasound, ultraviolet and infrared diagnostic techniques to study the painting in ultra-fine detail. He concluded that the painting could not be restored without damaging it and that only the underdrawing is by Leonardo. Another artist (or artists) was responsible for all of the existing paintwork on top of the underdrawing. Seracini stated that "none of the paint we see on the Adoration today was put there by Leonardo." As a part of his diagnostic survey on the Adoration of the Magi, Seracini completed more than 2,400 detailed infrared photographic records of the painting's elaborate underdrawing, and scientific analyses. The new images revealed by the diagnostic techniques used by Seracini were initially made public in 2002 in an interview with the New York Times reporter Melinda Henneberger. In 2005, nearing the end of his investigation, Seracini gave another interview, this time to The Guardian reporter John Hooper. Seracini finally published his results in 2006.

In the Smithsonian Channel TV program, Da Vinci Detective, Seracini conjectures that, upon seeing the preliminary drawings for the altarpiece they had commissioned, the monks of San Donato rejected it due to the sensational scenario presented to them. Fully expecting a traditional interpretation including the three wise men, they were instead confronted with a maelstrom of unrelated, half-emaciated figures surrounding the Christ Child, as well as a full-blown battle scene in the rear of the picture. Rather than destroy the work they chose instead to relegate it to a storage house. It was only much later, and probably in the context of the subsequent rise in value of Leonardo's artworks, that the work was resurrected and painted over by unknown persons to make it more salable. This later re-working of the panel resulted in alterations to Leonardo's original design.

== Restoration ==
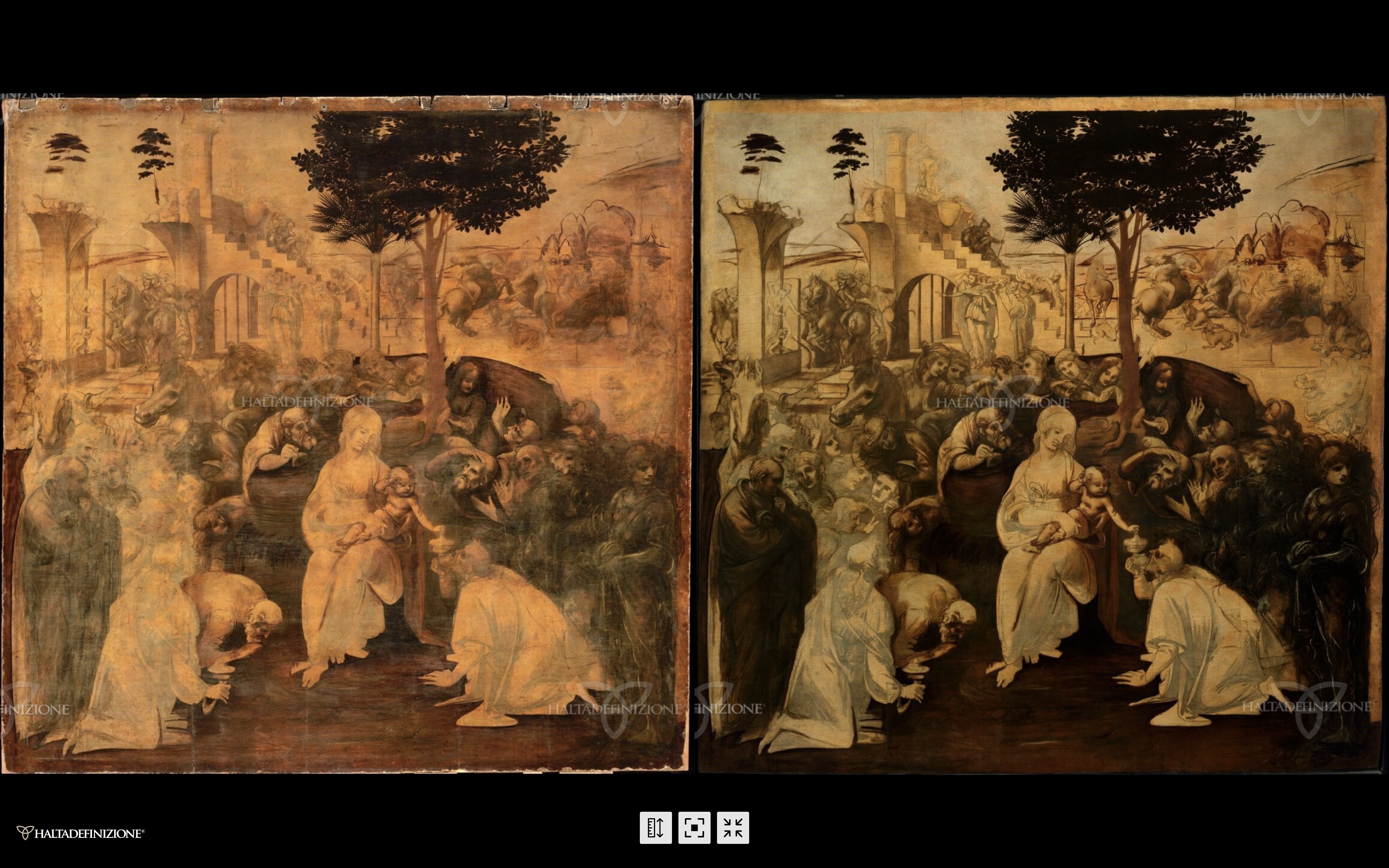
Adoration of the Magi by Leonardo da Vinci, both before and after its restoration. High definition viewer of before and after restoration

The Opificio delle Pietre Dure in Florence restored the work between 2012 and 2017, removing years of dirt and old varnish. The result is a work that is incredibly bright, with Leonardo's charcoal outline and marks clearly visible. The wood panels were also restored to stabilise the artwork.

== See also ==
- List of works by Leonardo da Vinci
- Adoration of the Magi (Filippino Lippi)
- Adoration of the Magi (Botticelli, 1475)

== Bibliography ==
- Costantino, Maria (1994). Leonardo. New York: Smithmark. ISBN 9780831756987.
