= Allnatt Diamond =

Yellow diamond

The Allnatt
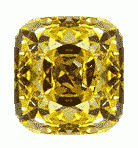
- Drawing of the Allnatt Diamond
- Weight: 101.29 carats (20.258 g)
- Color: Fancy Vivid Yellow
- Cut: Cushion
- Country of origin: probably South Africa
- Mine of origin: probably Premier Diamond Mine
- Discovered: unknown (pre-1950s)
- Cut by: several
- Original owner: Alfred Ernest Allnatt
- Owner: SIBA Corp.
- Estimated value: at least USD 3 million

The Allnatt Diamond is a diamond measuring 101.29 carats (20.258 g) with a cushion cut, rated in color as Fancy Vivid Yellow by the Gemological Institute of America.

== Naming ==
This diamond was named after one of its holders, Major Alfred Ernest Allnatt, a soldier, sportsman, art patron and benefactor.

== Overview ==
The Allnatt's origins are unknown prior to Major Allnatt's purchasing of the diamond in the early 1950s. After purchasing the diamond, he commissioned Cartier to make a setting for it. The final setting was a platinum flower with five petals, a stem and two leaves, all set with diamonds.

The Allnatt was resold at auction in May 1996 by Christie's in Geneva for $3,043,496 US. At the time of its sale the Allnatt was 102.07 carats (20.414 g). and was graded Fancy Intense Yellow. After being sold to the SIBA Corporation, the diamond was re-cut to its current weight and the intensity was upgraded as a result.

== Display ==
The Allnatt was displayed as part of the Smithsonian's "The Splendor of Diamonds" exhibit, alongside The De Beers Millennium Star and the Heart of Eternity Diamond.

== See also ==
- Eureka Diamond
- List of diamonds
