= Adoration of the Magi (Botticelli) =

Painting by Sandro Botticelli

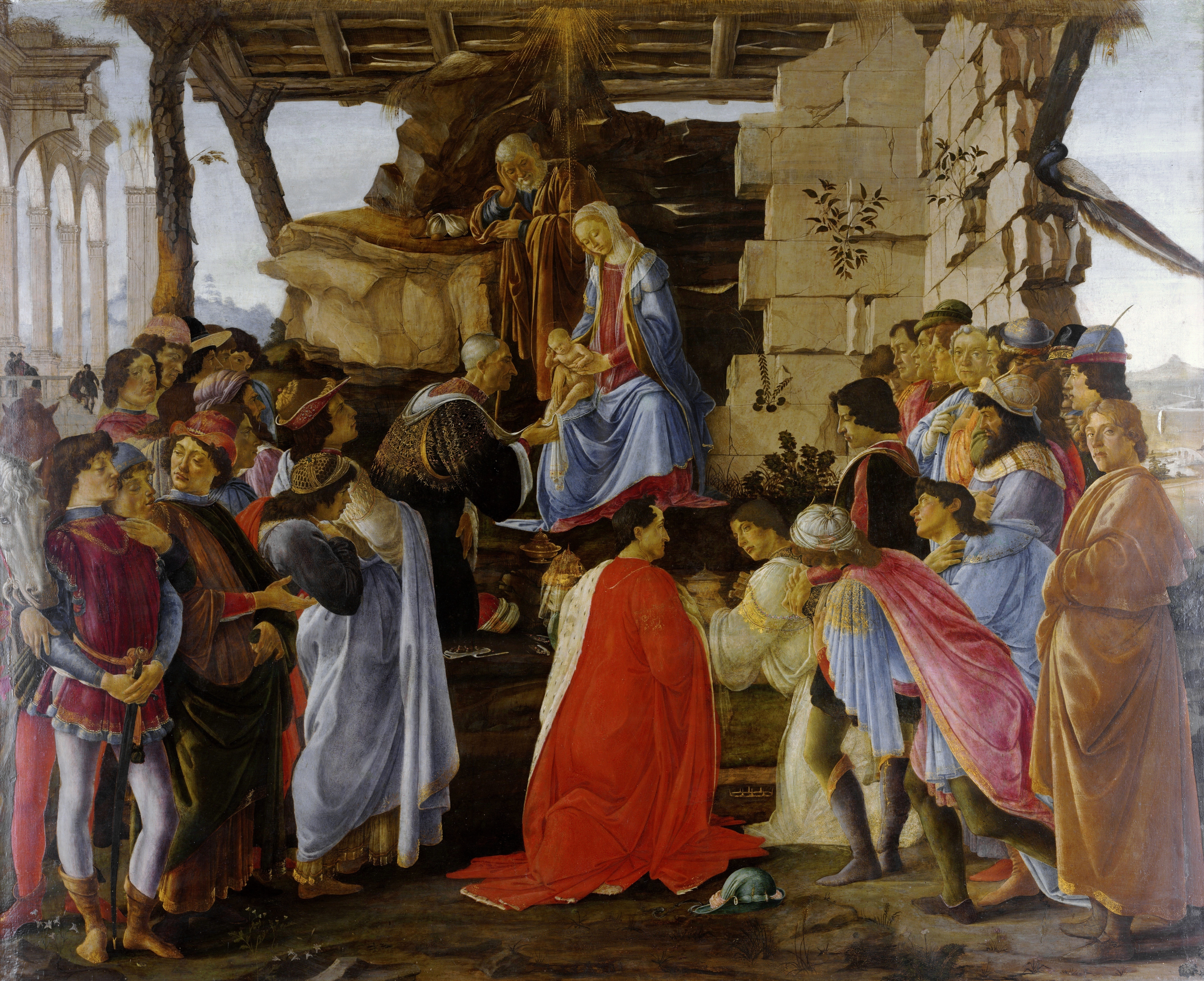
- Artist: Sandro Botticelli
- Year: c. 1475–1476
- Medium: Tempera on panel
- Dimensions: 111 cm × 134 cm (44 in × 53 in)
- Location: Uffizi Gallery, Florence

The Adoration of the Magi (Italian: Adorazione dei Magi) is a painting by the Italian Renaissance master Sandro Botticelli. Botticelli painted this piece for the altar in Gaspare di Zanobi del Lama's chapel in Santa Maria Novella around 1475. This painting depicts the Biblical story of the Three Magi following a star to find the newborn Jesus. The image of the altarpiece centers on the Virgin Mary and the newborn Jesus, with Saint Joseph behind them. Before them are the three kings who are described in the New Testament story of the Adoration of the Magi. The three kings worship the Christ Child and present him with gifts of gold, frankincense and myrrh. In addition, the Holy Family is surrounded by a group of people who came to see the child who was said to be the son of God.

== Patron ==
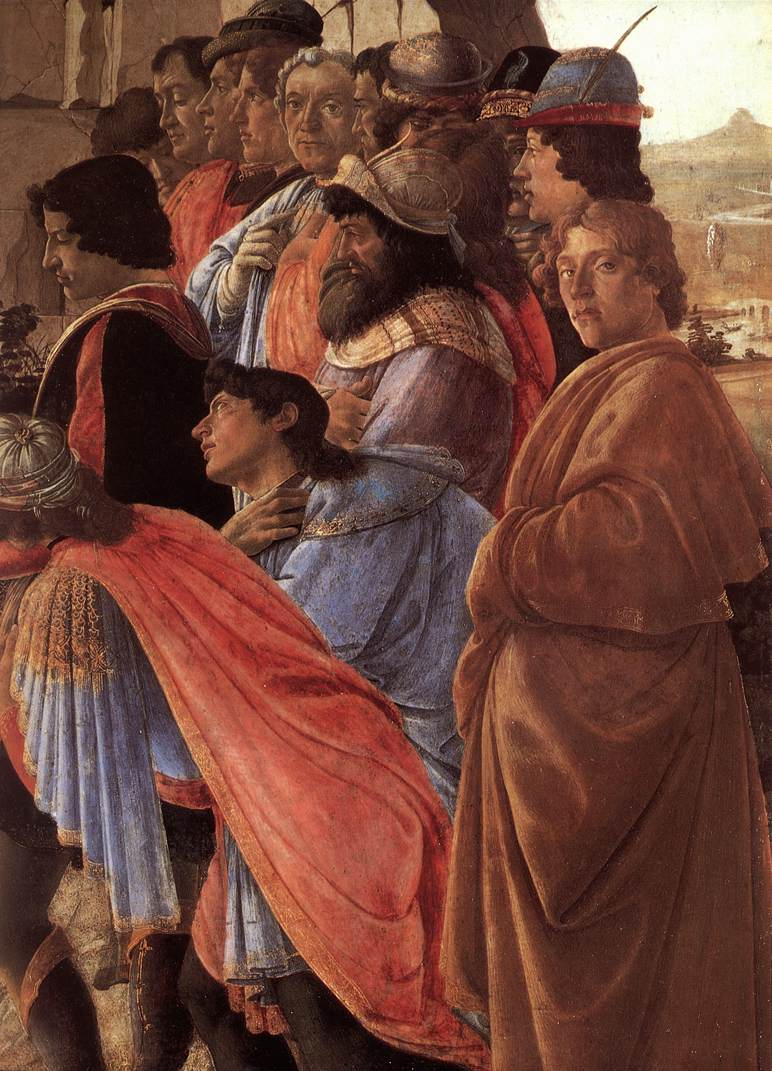
Detail of the Adoration of the Magi, self-portrait of Botticelli.

Around the year 1475, the Florentine banker and financial broker, Gaspare di Zanobi del Lama (alternately spelled: Guasparre dal Lama; Lami) commissioned the painting of the Adoration of the Magi by Sandro Botticelli. Gaspare di Zanobi, the son of a barber, was from Empoli, a small town outside of Florence. The altarpiece was commissioned for the altar of Gaspare's funerary chapel located in the Dominican monastery, Santa Maria Novella.

The chapel, and therefore the painting, would have been visible to the public. The panel depicts the biblical story of The Adoration of the Magi, and includes prominent members of the Medici family, as well as the patron, Gaspare (the Italian equivalent of Caspar, one of the three magi, and thus may account in part for the choice of the subject of the painting). Gaspare can be seen in the middle of the group of figures located to the right of the central scene. He is shown as an older man with white-grey hair who wears a blue robe and makes eye contact with the viewer. The figure who stands at the far right of the painting's foreground wears a yellow and gold-colored cloak and has been accepted by most scholars to be a self-portrait of the artist, Botticelli. Gaspare di Zanobi's private chapel was dedicated on January 6, the feast day for the Epiphany, illustrating one of the many symbolic references found in the painting.

== Provenance ==
The painting was passed down to the descendants of Gasparre di Zanobi del Lama and remained in its original location for nearly 100 years. The rights to the altar were transferred to the Fedini family around 1522. The altar was then passed on to Fabio Arrazola de Mondragone, Marquess of Mondragone, around 1570, who removed the painting from the altar to his palace. It was seized, along with the rest of his property, in 1575 due to his betrayal of Francesco I de' Medici (r. 1541–1587), Grand Duke of Tuscany. The painting was then moved to the grand ducal collections in 1575 and then to the Villa del Poggio Imperiale in 1622. In 1796, it moved to the Uffizi Gallery in Florence, Italy, where it remains to this day.

The painting was in the Minneapolis Institute of Art for an exhibition in 2022/23.

== Description ==
Botticelli's scene is set within a landscape that includes classical ruins from the Greco-Roman world, such as the classical arcade in the middle ground at the left. The Virgin Mary, Saint Joseph, and the Christ Child are sitting upon one of these classical ruins that served as a makeshift manger where the birth (nativity) of Christ occurred. Greenery is growing out of the cracks in the ruin, and a peacock is perched at the right. The star of Bethlehem radiates gold rays at the top of the painting, highlighting the Virgin and Child.

The formal elements of Botticelli's Adoration of the Magi include solid, firm figures, and intense, saturated colors, especially reds. These elements helped the painting stand out on the altar, as it was competing with a magnificent frame and was muted by limited lighting. It is important to consider in which conditions the painting would have been viewed at the time it was created: after sundown, it would have been viewed in candlelight, which may have caused the reds to become warm and to appear as if they were glowing. This glow is not visible today as the painting is now lit by artificial lighting.

== The subject ==
The story of the Adoration of the Magi (or "Kings") was a standard episode in cycles of the Life of the Virgin and Life of Christ in art and so frequently painted throughout the fifteenth by artists including Botticelli, and his mentor Filippo Lippi. Botticelli was commissioned to paint it at least seven times. Patrons and painters throughout Europe were particularly drawn to this story, especially in Florence, Italy. Wealthy patrons may have been particularly drawn to the display of riches and finery that were displayed in the magi's expensive and exotic clothes and gifts. In Italian cities such as Florence many patrons were themselves involved in international trade, including with parts of the Islamic world.

The "Other" is a term used by art historians today that describes how Europeans viewers cast unknown peoples and foreigners, including Muslims, Jews and peoples from the so-called "Orient" (the East), as well as indigenous cultures from the so-called "New World" of the Ancient Americas (who do not appear in this subject). In theology the Three Magi represented the first Gentiles to recognise Christ, and legendary accretions to the story made each represent a different part of the world beyond Europe and the Middle East.

Identifiable clothing was one of the main ways the "Other" was depicted. For instance, many of the figures are shown wearing different types of textiles that have bands of gold at the shoulders and the hems; these likely refer to Asian textiles known as "tartar cloths" or Islamic-style tiraz textiles with inscriptions. Examples of these exotic luxury goods were available in various church collections across the different Italian city-states, including the treasury of the Basilica of Saint Francis of Assisi. Luxury textiles from Asia and Islamic lands became signifiers of wealth, prestige and thus functioned as status symbols—when included in a religious painting like Botticelli's Adoration of the Magi, they functioned as a way to bestow honor and glory on images of holy figures and well as the patron.

Another way the idea of "Other" is demonstrated was by the inclusion of rare and exotic objects in artistic representations. There are several different types of gold cups and receptacles that are presented by the three kings Botticelli's Adoration of the Magi. In other versions of this subject by various artists, different types of expensive luxury items were included in the story thereby reflecting Christian European fascination with the exotic. For example, Andrea Mantegna's The Adoration of the Magi (1462) depicts the three kings presenting the Christ child with novel gifts: Melchior presents an incense censer from Ottoman Turkey, Balthazar holds an agate jar from Persia, and Caspar holds a blue and white Chinese porcelain bowl. The objects represented in these paintings likely referred to similar objects in both royal and ecclesiastical collections, as well as those luxury items far-away lands available at markets in places like Florence and Venice.

== Botticelli, the Medici, and Portraits of the Medici Family ==
The Medici were a very powerful and wealthy family in Italy in the 1400s. In the 1470s, Sandro Botticelli developed a close relationship with the Medici family. The Medici family commissioned a series of artworks painted by Botticelli throughout the late 1400s. These works include Portrait of a Young Man with a Medal of Cosimo the Elder (c. 1474/75), where the man resembled the likeness of Cosimo de' Medici, and changed the direction of portrait painting, especially with the use of such a prominent male subject. Furthermore, Botticelli painted multiple different portraits of Giuliano de' Medici throughout the 1470s.

There are different theories of who is included or if they are even included at all. One interpretation comes from the first edition of Giorgio Vasari's Lives (1550). Vasari wrote that the oldest Magus, Caspar, was a depiction of Cosimo de' Medici (r.1434–1464), who was the head of the Medici household and Medici Bank from 1429 to 1464. Vasari goes on to write that the Magus in the middle represents Giuliano de' Medici (1453–1478), and that the last Magus is Giovanni di Cosimo de' Medici, the son of Cosimo de' Medici. Another interpretation comes from Heinrich Ulmann's 1983 monograph on Botticelli in which he proposed that the central Magus is actually Piero di Cosimo de' Medici (r.1464–1469). Ulmann also suggests that the dark-haired man behind the youngest Magus is Giuliano de' Medici (b.1453-d.1478) and that the young man with the sword on the left is Lorenzo de' Medici (r.1449–1492), otherwise known as Lorenzo il Magnifico. Most scholars agree that The Adoration of the Magi includes the Medici family patron, Cosimo de' Medici and his sons Piero di Cosimo de' Medici (r.1464–1469) and Giovanni di Cosimo de' Medici (b.1421-d.1463), as posthumous portraits, as well as his grandsons Lorenzo de' Medici (r.1449–1492) and Giuliano de' Medici (b.1453-d.1478), as living portraits.

The inclusion of the Medici portraits in Botticelli's Adoration of the Magi shows just how influential the family was in Italian society at the time. Moreover, the Medici were customarily shown as the magi because they were members of the Florentine confraternity, the Company of the Magi.

It is also possible that their portraits were used to convey the desire for divine protection for the Medici family. Whether Botticelli's intimate relations with the Medici brothers allowed the wealthy Gaspare to introduce the portraits of their kinsmen in his altar-piece, or Gaspare was glad for this opportunity to pay a graceful compliment to these powerful personages is hard to tell. It is, however, apparent from the great pains Botticelli took with these figures, that this formed an important part of the task.

== Style ==
In his Lives, Vasari describes the Adoration in the following way:

of the heads in this scene is indescribable, their attitudes all different, some full-face, some in profile, some three-quarters, some bent down, and in various other ways, while the expressions of the attendants, both young and old, are greatly varied, displaying the artist's perfect mastery of his profession. Sandro further clearly shows the distinction between the suites of each of the kings. It is a marvelous work in colour, design and composition.

The attention to details, such as the garments rendering, shows the acquisition by the Florentine artist of the influences from the Flemish school at this point of his career.

== See also ==
- List of works by Sandro Botticelli
- Adoration of the Magi (Filippino Lippi)
- Adoration of the Magi (Leonardo da Vinci)
