= Adoration of the Magi (Andrea della Robbia) =

Terracotta relief

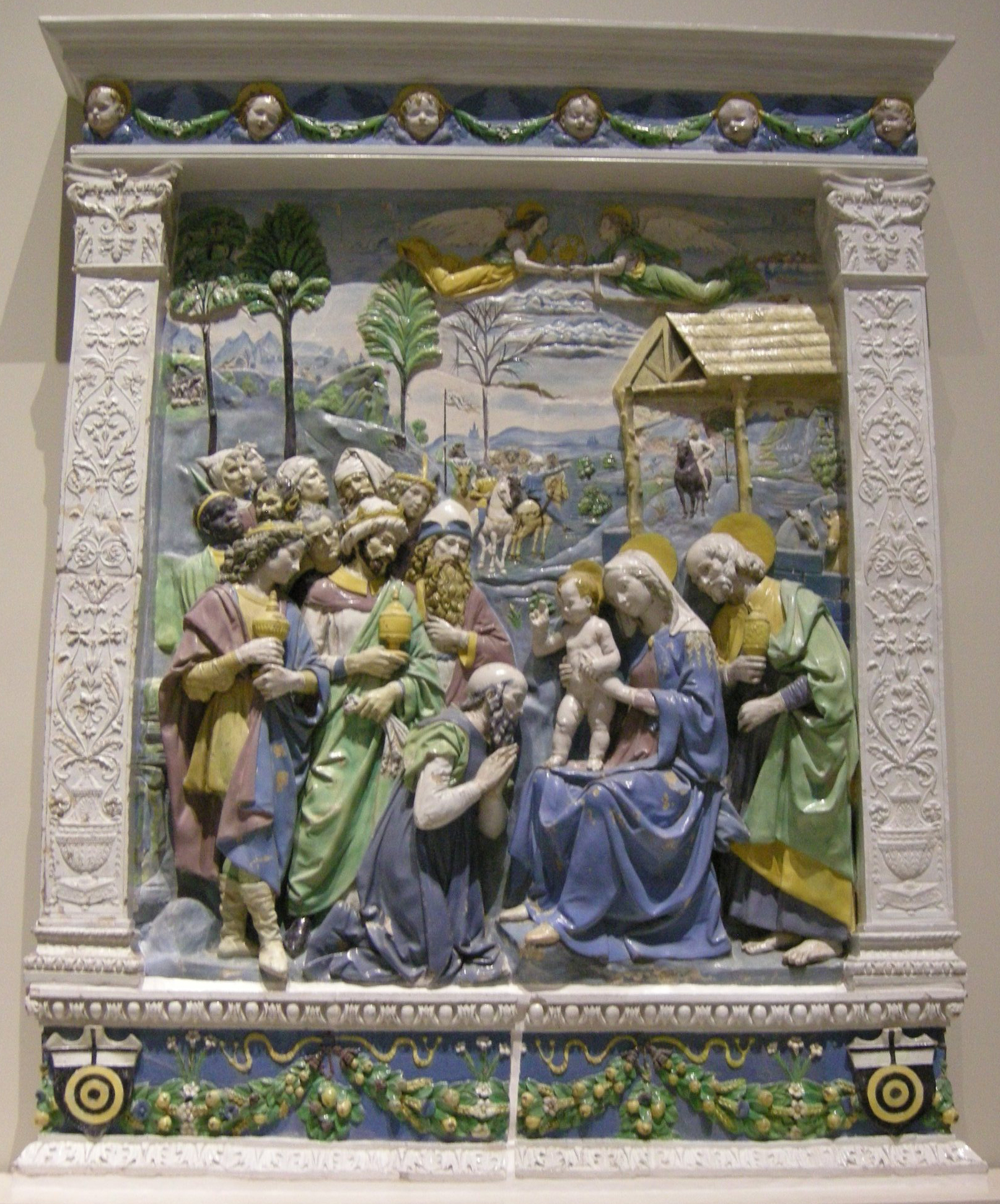
The Adoration of the Magi, about 1500–1510, Andrea della Robbia (1435–1525). Victoria and Albert Museum no. 4412-1857.

This depiction of the Adoration of the Magi is an altarpiece by the Florentine Italian Renaissance sculptor Andrea della Robbia (1435–1525). Andrea inherited the family workshop from his famous uncle, Luca della Robbia, who had developed the technique of applying tin glazes, similar to those used by potters, to terracotta (fired clay) to produce sculptures that were colourful, durable and relatively cheap. Larger sculptures, such as this example which dates to about 1500–1510, were made in sections in order to fit into the kiln for firing.

The scene is set in a landscape, showing the Three Kings with attendants, offering their gifts to the Holy Family. Andrea's sculpture was similar in style to contemporary painting, but certain colours, such as red, could not be produced in tin-glaze. The coat-of-arms of the Albizzi, a prominent Florentine family, can be seen on the frame, and the relief was probably commissioned by them for a church not far from Florence. The shiny surface of the altarpiece would have reflected the candlelight in the chapel, bringing the image to life.

== Bibliography ==
- Jackson, Anna, ed. (2001). V&A: A Hundred Highlights. V&A Publications.
