= Lamentation of Christ (van der Weyden) =

Painting by Rogier van der Weyden

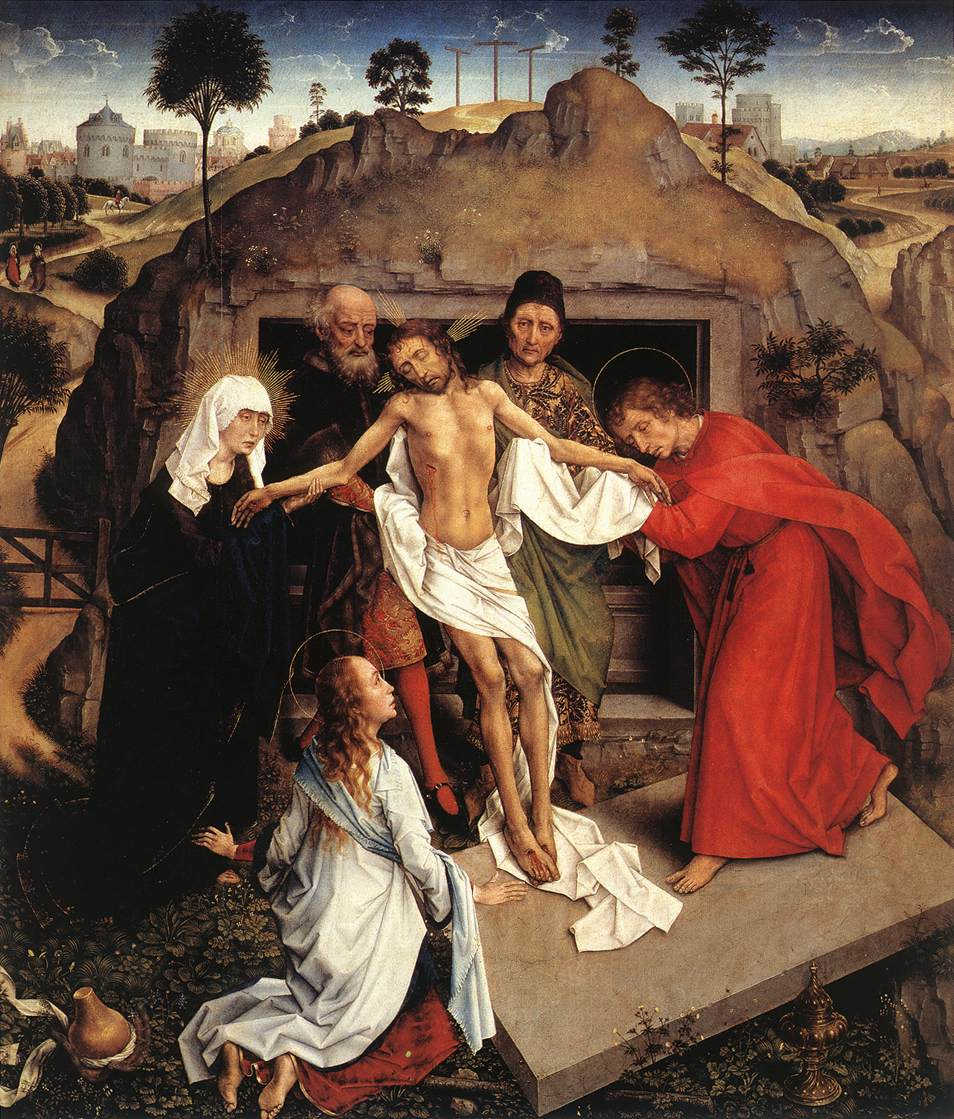
- Artist: Rogier van der Weyden
- Year: c. 1460–1463
- Type: Oil on panel
- Dimensions: 96 cm × 110 cm (38 in × 43 in)
- Location: Uffizi Gallery, Florence

The Lamentation of Christ is an oil-on-panel painting of the common subject of the Lamentation of Christ by the Netherlandish artist Rogier van der Weyden, dating from around 1460–1463 and now in the Uffizi Gallery, Florence, Italy.

== History ==
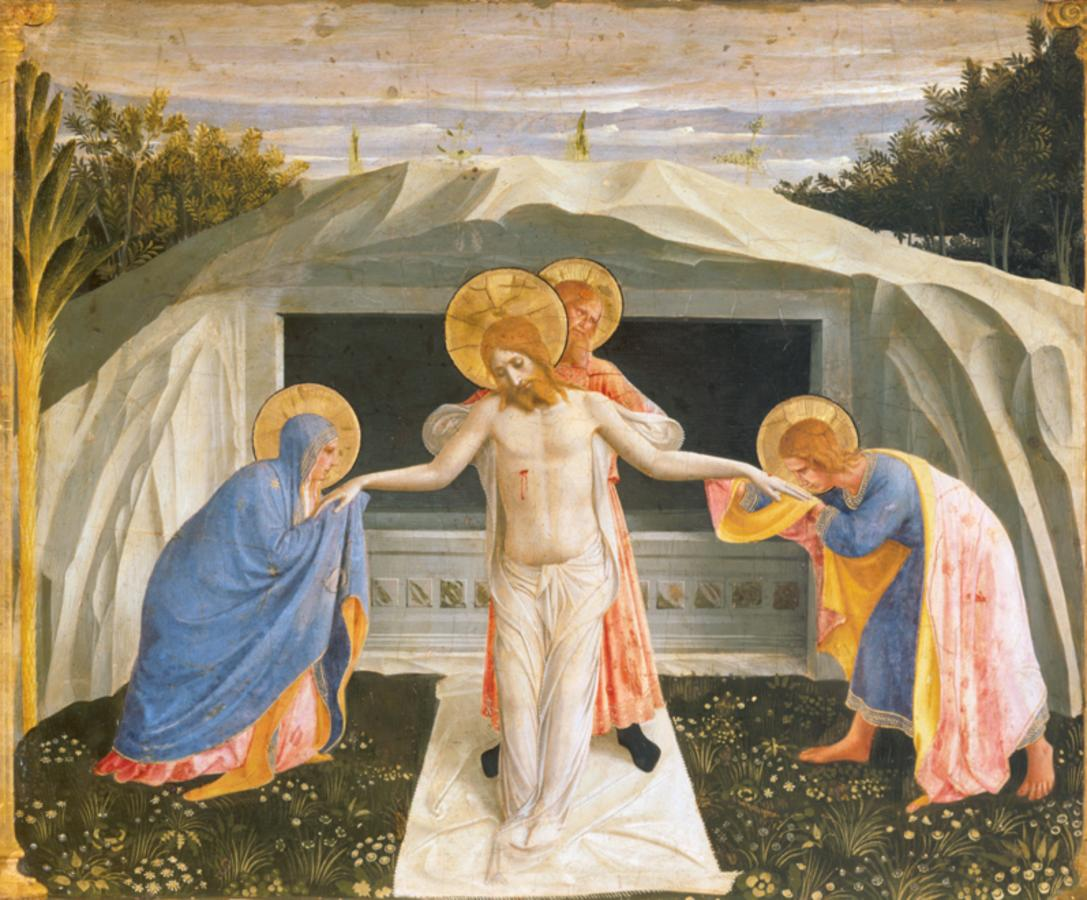
Fra Angelico's Pietà

The work is perhaps the "altarpiece [with] Our Lord's sepulchre [...] and other five figures" which appear in the inventory made in 1492 at the death of Lorenzo de' Medici, and which decorated his Villa at Careggi since as early as 1482. The panel was thus one of the works commissioned by the Medici to van der Weyden, including the Medici Madonna now at Städel of Frankfurt, which has been also assigned to the artist's trip to Italy in 1450. Another hypothesis is that the panel was part of a lost triptych painted for Lionello d'Este of Ferrara, and mentioned in 1449, or that it was the painting described by Giorgio Vasari as Hans Memling's.

The panel adopts the same scheme in Fra Angelico's Pietà for the predella of the San Marco Altarpiece (1438–1443), now at the Alte Pinakothek, Munich, confirming that the Flemish artist visited Florence during his pilgrimage in Italy of 1449–1450, as mentioned in De viribus illustribus by Bartolomeo Facio (c. 1456). The work was later part of the collections of cardinal Carlo de' Medici, being moved to the Uffizi Gallery in 1666. Filippo Baldinucci described it as a work by Albrecht Dürer. In 1989 it was still assigned to Hans Memling by some scholars, but in 1992 reflex photography showed the underlying drawing, which was clearly executed by van der Weyden.

== Description ==
The painting has a rectangular shape, and shows Christ being buried with the weeping Mary and John the Evangelist holding his hands. The corpse is supported by Joseph of Arimathea and by Nicodemus dressed in refined clothing of the times and gazing out towards the spectator, once thought to be a self-portrait of the artist which is now known to portray Cosimo the elder. A kneeling Mary Magdalene is depicted in the low foreground.

The composition is similar to Angelico's Pietà, but the scene here is more complex and crowded, with less geometrically ordered lines and more anguished faces. The use of oil paint also allowed van der Weyden to obtain deeper colours and a more brilliant light. The attention to details is also typical of the early Netherlandish painting school.

== See also ==
- List of works by Rogier van der Weyden

== Sources ==
- Campbell, Lorne (2004). Van der Weyden. London: Chaucer Press. ISBN 1-904449-24-7.
