= Bartolomeo di Giovanni =

Italian painter

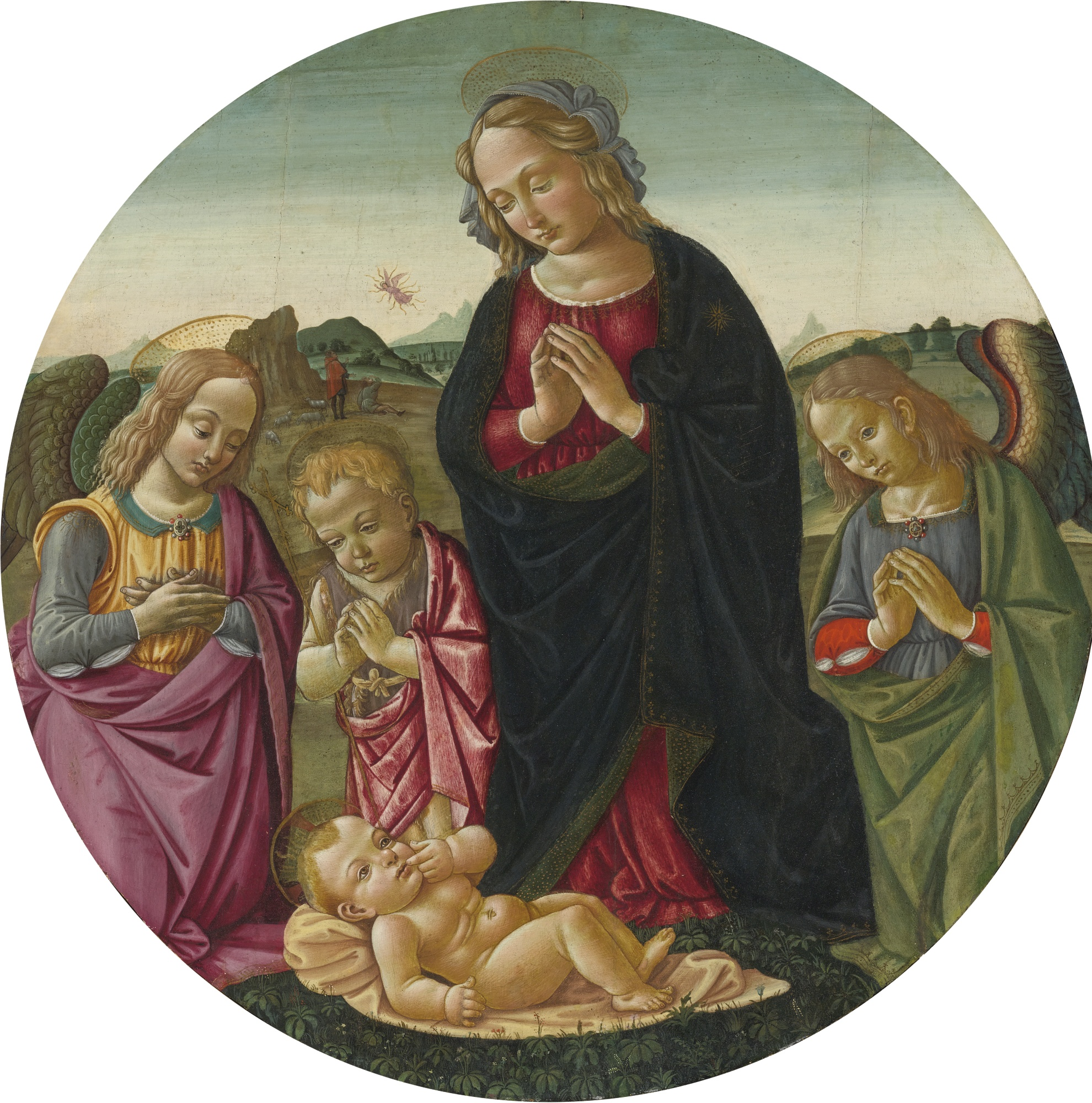
A tondo of the Madonna and infant Saint John the Baptist adoring the Christ child with two angels and the Annunciation to the Shepherds beyond; tempera on panel

Bartolomeo di Giovanni di Domenico (1458? – 1501) was an Italian Renaissance painter active in Florence. His works were first identified by the art historian Bernard Berenson, who did not know the painter's real name so called him the "Alunno di Domenico" (i.e., "student of Domenico Ghirlandaio"). This name was based on Berenson's observation that the painter executed the predella of Ghirlandaio's Adoration of the Magi (1488) in the Ospedale degli Innocenti, the foundling hospital in Florence. Archival research later yielded the painter's real name as Bartolomeo di Giovanni. Bartolomeo also collaborated with Sandro Botticelli.

Bartolomeo di Giovanni painted many narrative panels, including predella, cassone and spalliera panels. He also painted altarpieces, such as the Madonna and Child with Four Saints (1498) for San Giovanni di Boldrone, Florence, now at the Mount Holyoke College Art Museum.

The painter should not be confused with the Italian sculptor and architect Bartolomeo di Giovanni d'Astore Sinibaldi (1469–1535), or with the Italian painter and architect, Bartolommeo di Giovanni Corradini, known as Fra Carnevale (1416–1484). He is also not the same as the two other late fifteenth-century Florentines with similar names: Bartolomeo di Giovanni Masini, a sargiaio (cloth painter), or Bartolomeo di Giovanni del Fora, a cartolaio (stationer).
