= Deaths in June 2022 =

The following is a list of notable deaths in June 2022.

Entries for each day are listed alphabetically by surname. A typical entry lists information in the following sequence:

- Name, age, country of citizenship at birth, subsequent country of citizenship (if applicable), reason for notability, cause of death (if known), and reference.

== June 2022 ==
=== 1 ===
- Syed Ahmad Syed Abu Bakar, 77, Malaysian footballer (Johor, Penang, national team), prostate cancer.
- Marion Barber III, 38, American football player (Dallas Cowboys, Chicago Bears), heat stroke.
- Yadunath Baskey, 95, Indian politician.
- Aleksandr Berketov, 46, Russian footballer (Rotor Volgograd, CSKA Moscow).
- Sir Gerard Brennan, 94, Australian lawyer and jurist, Justice (1981–1995) and Chief Justice (1995–1998) of the High Court.
- Oris Buckner, 70, American police detective and whistleblower.
- Peter Daley, 71, American politician, member of the Pennsylvania House of Representatives (1983–2016).
- Serge Diantantu, 62, Congolese comic book artist.
- Anthony Drake, 81, English teacher, designer of the flag of Saskatchewan.
- Ilia Eloshvili, 47, Georgian politician, minister of energy (2016, 2017).
- Charles Kernaghan, 74, American human rights, anti-corporation and worker's rights activist.
- Jean Lèques, 90, New Caledonian politician, president of the Government of New Caledonia (1999–2001) and mayor of Nouméa (1986–2014).
- James M. Lewis, 78, American politician, member of the Tennessee Senate (1986–1990).
- John Lloyd, 77, Australian footballer (Carlton), cancer.
- Lu Feng, 95, Chinese politician.
- Frank Manumaleuna, 66, American football player (Kansas City Chiefs).
- Paulo Antonino Mascarenhas Roxo, 93, Brazilian Roman Catholic prelate, bishop of Mogi das Cruzes (1989–2004).
- Carman McClelland, 70, Canadian politician and lawyer, Ontario MPP (1987–1995).
- Salvador Elá Nseng, 82, Equatorial Guinean military leader and politician, vice president (1979–1980).
- Richard Oldcorn, 84, English Olympic fencer (1964, 1968, 1972).
- David Parry, 84, British dialectologist.
- May Routh, 87, British-American costume designer (The Man Who Fell to Earth, Splash, Being There).
- Mark Schaeffer, 73, American baseball player (San Diego Padres).
- Shelby Scott, 86, American television journalist (KIRO-TV, WBZ-TV) and union president (AFTRA).
- Barry Sussman, 87, American newspaper editor (The Washington Post), gastrointestinal bleeding.
- István Szőke, 75, Hungarian footballer (Ferencváros, national team), stroke.
- Takeyoshi Tanuma, 93, Japanese photographer.
- Leroy Williams, 85, American jazz drummer.
- Joseph Zoderer, 86, Italian writer.
- Jorge Zuloaga, 100, Colombian comedian, actor (The Strategy of the Snail) and reporter.

=== 2 ===
- Ken Bode, 83, American journalist (Washington Week).
- John R. Brazil, 76, American academic administrator.
- Kai Bumann, 61, German-Polish conductor and teacher (Warsaw Chamber Opera, Polish Baltic Philharmonic), heart attack.
- Joyce Burditt, 83, American television writer (Diagnosis: Murder, Matlock, Father Dowling Mysteries).
- Hal Bynum, 87, American songwriter ("Lucille", "Chains", "Papa Was a Good Man"), complications from a stroke and Alzheimer's disease.
- Paul Coppo, 83, American Olympic ice hockey player (1964).
- Kay Dalton, 90, American football coach (Montreal Alouettes, Kansas City Chiefs, Denver Broncos).
- Andrey Gaponov-Grekhov, 95, Russian physicist.
- Allan Hogg, 82, English-born Canadian darts player
- Nobuyuki Idei, 84, Japanese businessman (Sony Corporation), liver failure.
- Agneta Klingspor, 76, Swedish author.
- Marta Lafuente, 54, Paraguayan psychologist and politician.
- Gonzalo Lopez, 46, American fugitive and mass murderer, shot.
- José Luccioni, 72, French actor (Like a Pot of Strawberries).
- Brian Matthews, 85, Australian literary scholar and writer.
- Gracia Montes, 86, Spanish copla singer.
- Valentin Oehen, 90, Swiss politician, MP (1971–1987).
- Charles L. Peterson, 95, American painter.
- Anatoly Pokrovsky, 91, Russian vascular surgeon.
- Rebecca Sitsapesan, 62, British cardiac pharmacologist.
- Bhajan Sopori, 73, Indian santoor player, colon cancer.
- Carl Stiner, 85, American military officer, commander of USSOCOM (1990–1993).
- Berndt Stübner, 75, German actor (Wedding Night in the Rain), playwright and theatre director.
- James Ronald Walker, 74, American politician, member of the Georgia State Senate (1977–1984).
- Uri Zohar, 86, Israeli film director (Hole in the Moon, Three Days and a Child, Bloomfield) and rabbi.

=== 3 ===
- José de Abreu, 77, Brazilian businessman and politician, deputy (1995–2003).
- Robert L. Backman, 100, American politician, member of the Utah House of Representatives (1971–1975).
- David B. Barker, 79, British Olympic equestrian.
- Saafi Boulbaba, 36, Tunisian footballer (Espérance Sportive de Tunis, A S Kasserine, MC El Eulma), traffic collision.
- Piergiorgio Bressani, 92, Italian politician, deputy (1963–1986), and mayor of Udine (1985–1990).
- Raymond Chabanne, 98, French military officer.
- Frank Clarke, 79, English footballer (Shrewsbury Town, Queens Park Rangers, Carlisle United).
- Ann Turner Cook, 95, American author and model (Gerber Baby).
- Liliana de Curtis, 89, Italian actress (Orient Express) and writer.
- El Noba, 25, Argentine cumbia singer, injuries from traffic collision.
- Christopher Evans-Ironside, 82, English-German songwriter, composer and music producer.
- John W. Farley, 74, American atomic physicist.
- Sophie Freud, 97, Austrian psychologist, pancreatic cancer.
- Kari Frisell, 99, Norwegian operatic soprano and pedagogue.
- Raffaele Ganci, 90, Italian mobster, heart attack.
- Geoff Hunter, 62, English footballer (Crewe Alexandra, Port Vale, Wrexham).
- Ken Kelly, 76, American fantasy artist and album cover designer (Kiss, Rainbow, Manowar).
- Ra'anan Levy, 68, French-Israeli artist.
- Browne C. Lewis, 60, American legal scholar.
- Alexander Madiebo, 90, Nigerian soldier, chief of army staff of the Biafran Armed Forces.
- David Matravers, 84, South African cosmologist.
- Grachan Moncur III, 85, American jazz trombonist, cardiac arrest.
- Shinjiro Ono, 74, Japanese patent attorney.
- Tony Pajaczkowski, 86, Canadian football player (Calgary Stampeders, Montreal Alouettes).
- John Porter, 87, American politician, member of the Illinois House of Representatives (1973–1979) and U.S. House of Representatives (1980–2001).
- John Pier Roemer, 68, American jurist, judge on the Wisconsin circuit courts (2004–2017), shot.
- Roger Scholes, 71, Australian film and television director, writer (The Tale of Ruby Rose) and cinematographer.
- Dorothy E. Smith, 95, British-born Canadian sociologist.
- Anna Maria Tatò, 82, Italian film director (The Night and the Moment, Marcello Mastroianni: I Remember).
- Jack Weisgerber, 81, Canadian politician and businessman, British Columbia MLA (1986–2001).
- Adam Wolańczyk, 86, Polish actor (Johnnie Waterman, Pan Tadeusz).
- Dougie Wood, 82, Scottish footballer (Athlone Town, Shelbourne, Sligo Rovers).
- Michael Zeilik, 75, American astronomer.

=== 4 ===
- Isaac Berger, 85, American weightlifter, Olympic champion (1956).
- John Berks, 80, South African radio presenter.
- John Cooksey, 80, American ophthalmologist and politician, member of the U.S. House of Representatives (1997–2003).
- Ismail Daut, 66, Malaysian politician, MP (2013–2018), fall.
- Fei Liang, 85, Chinese herpetologist.
- Prayar Gopalakrishnan, 72, Indian politician, Kerala MLA (2001–2006), heart attack.
- Frank Hoffmann, 83, German-Austrian actor (Ace of Aces, Derrick).
- Lloyd Holt, 84, Canadian racing driver.
- Hu Fa-kuang, 98, Hong Kong businessman and politician, member of the Legislative Council (1979–1988).
- Sherry Huber, 84, American environmentalist and politician, member of the Maine House of Representatives (1976–1982).
- Hajime Ishii, 87, Japanese politician, minister of home affairs (1994) and MP (1969–1983, 1986–2005), heart failure.
- Dmitry Kovtun, 56, Russian intelligence officer, COVID-19.
- George Lamming, 94, Barbadian novelist (In the Castle of My Skin) and poet.
- Joyce C. Lashof, 96, American physician.
- Patricia Latham, 79, American LGBT rights activist.
- Robert Laurie, 66, Australian rugby league player (Eastern Suburbs, South Sydney Rabbitohs, New South Wales).
- Beryl J. Levine, 86, Canadian-born American judge, justice on the North Dakota Supreme Court (1985–1996).
- Nate Miller, 34, American basketball player (Ironi Nahariya, Ironi Ramat Gan, Incheon ET Land Elephants), complications from asthma.
- György Moldova, 88, Hungarian writer.
- Ivan Mosyakin, 74, Russian politician, MP (2003–2007).
- Peter Neale, 88, English footballer (Oldham Athletic, Scunthorpe United, Chesterfield).
- Eric Nesterenko, 88, Canadian ice hockey player (Chicago Blackhawks, Toronto Maple Leafs) and actor (Youngblood), Stanley Cup champion (1961).
- Sir David Nicholas, 92, British broadcast journalist, ITN editor and chief executive (1977–1989).
- Mike Omotosho, Nigerian politician.
- Donald Pelletier, 90, American Roman Catholic prelate, bishop of Morondava (1999–2010).
- Marc Pessin, 89, French engraver, editor, and illustrator.
- Thubten Samphel, 65, Tibetan writer and government official.
- Goran Sankovič, 42, Slovenian footballer (SK Slavia Prague, Panionios, national team).
- Jeffrey Silverthorne, 75-76, American photographer, prostate cancer.
- Skull Duggery, 51, American rapper (These Wicked Streets).
- Robert Stewart, 55, American football player (Charlotte Rage, New Jersey Red Dogs, Carolina Cobras).
- Alec John Such, 70, American Hall of Fame bassist (Bon Jovi).
- Veryl Switzer, 89, American football player (Green Bay Packers, Calgary Stampeders, Montreal Alouettes).
- Neila Tavares, 73, Brazilian actress (Vai Trabalhar, Vagabundo!), journalist and television presenter.
- Bolesław Tejkowski, 88, Polish politician, sociologist and engineer.
- Tomás Várnagy, 71, Argentine philosopher.
- Mubarak Al-Zwair, 94–95, Kuwaiti politician, MP (1985–1986).

=== 5 ===
- Haidar Abdul-Razzaq, 39, Iraqi footballer (Al-Ittihad, Sulaymaniya, national team), blunt force trauma.
- Laureano Albán, 80, Costa Rican writer.
- Sumana Amarasinghe, 74, Sri Lankan actress (Dahasak Sithuvili, Binaramalee, Kadawunu Poronduwa), costume designer and film producer.
- Peter Ascherl, 68, Canadian-German ice hockey player (Mannheim ERC, Düsseldorfer EG).
- Giuseppe Azzaro, 96, Italian lawyer and politician, deputy (1963–1992), mayor of Catania (1987–1988, 1991).
- John Bates, 87, British fashion designer, cancer.
- William Devonshire, 52, American serial killer, cerebral hemorrhage.
- Stanley Goreraza, Zimbabwean military officer, cancer.
- Shaun Greatbatch, 52, English darts player.
- Alma Rosa Hernández Escobar, 65, Mexican politician, deputy (since 2021).
- Richard Edwin Hills, 76, British astronomer.
- Roman Kutuzov, 53, Russian major general.
- Edwin M. Leidel Jr., 83, American Episcopal prelate, bishop of Eastern Michigan (1996–2006), cancer.
- Alex Magaisa, 46, Zimbabwean academic and political advisor.
- Garnik Mehrabian, 84, Iranian football player (Taj, national team) and manager (Machine Sazi).
- Aleksandr Nikitin, 87, Russian chess player, theorist and coach.
- Oddleif Olavsen, 76, Norwegian footballer (Bodø/Glimt) and politician, mayor of Bodø (1995–1999).
- Bruno Pereira, 41, Brazilian indigenist, shot.
- Dom Phillips, 57, British journalist, shot.
- Christopher Pratt, 86, Canadian painter and printmaker, designer of the flag of Newfoundland and Labrador.
- Eldon Rasmussen, 85, Canadian Hall of Fame racing driver.
- Berit Stensønes, 66, Norwegian mathematician.
- Roger Swinfen Eady, 3rd Baron Swinfen, 83, British politician and philanthropist, member of the House of Lords (since 1977).
- Trouble, 34, American rapper, shot.
- Roberto Wirth, 72, Italian hotelier, heart attack.

=== 6 ===
- Isabel Álvarez, 88, Cuban baseball player (Chicago Colleens, Fort Wayne Daisies, Kalamazoo Lassies).
- Brother Jed, 79, American evangelist.
- Gianni Clerici, 91, Italian tennis commentator and journalist.
- Florence d'Harcourt, 93, French politician, deputy (1978–1988).
- Jacques Destoop, 90, French painter and actor (Bye bye, Barbara).
- Zeta Emilianidou, 67, Cypriot lawyer and politician, minister of labour and social insurance (since 2013), complications from ruptured brain aneurysm.
- Juliette de La Genière, 94, French archaeologist.
- Helen Hodgman, 77, Scottish-born Australian novelist.
- David Hughes, 80, British astronomer.
- William Hutton, 93, Canadian politician, member of the Metropolitan Corporation of Greater Winnipeg (1969–1971).
- Ed Kassian, 88, Canadian ice hockey player (Penticton Vees, national team), world champion (1955).
- Keijo Korhonen, 88, Finnish diplomat and politician, minister for foreign affairs (1976–1977).
- Lee Hui-seong, 97, South Korean military officer and politician, minister of transport (1982–1983).
- Séamus Looney, 72, Irish hurler and Gaelic footballer (UCC GAA, Cork GAA).
- Ruth B. Love, 90, American school superintendent.
- Orlando Jorge Mera, 55, Dominican lawyer and politician, minister of environment and natural resources (since 2020), shot.
- A. L. Mestel, 95, American pediatric surgeon and visual artist.
- Edward C. Oliver, 92, American politician, member of the Minnesota Senate (1993–2002).
- John Pangkey, 72, Indonesian military officer and politician, member of the West Kalimantan Regional People's Representative Council (1999–2004).
- Zinovy Roizman, 80, Russian film and animation director and screenwriter (Empire Under Attack).
- Valery Ryumin, 82, Russian cosmonaut (Soyuz 25, Soyuz 32, Soyuz 35).
- Michele Scandiffio, 93, Italian Roman Catholic prelate, archbishop of Acerenza (1988–2005).
- Jim Seals, 79, American musician (Seals and Crofts, The Champs) and songwriter ("Summer Breeze").
- Daniel H. Simpson, 82, American diplomat.
- William J. Sullivan, 83, American judge, member (1999–2009) and chief justice of the Connecticut Supreme Court (2001–2006).
- Yves-Marie Vérove, 72, French basketball player (AS Berck, Caen, Étendard de Brest) and coach.
- Jacques Villeglé, 96, French mixed-media artist.
- Wong Chun Hin, 26, Hong Kong footballer (Eastern, Wong Tai Sin, Lee Man), fall.

=== 7 ===
- Robert Alexander, 64, American football player (Los Angeles Rams).
- Carl, Duke of Württemberg, 85, German royal, head of the House of Württemberg (since 1975).
- Frank Cipriani, 81, American baseball player (Kansas City Athletics).
- Anne Cutler, 77, Australian psycholinguist, director emeritus of the Max Planck Institute for Psycholinguistics.
- Tommy Dysart, 86, Scottish-born Australian actor (Prisoner, The Man from Snowy River, Flynn).
- Trudy Haynes, 95, American journalist (WXYZ-TV, KYW-TV).
- Marco Luzzago, 71, Italian aristocrat, lieutenant of the Sovereign Military Order of Malta (since 2020), heart attack.
- Desmond McNamara, 84, British actor (Hazell, Roll Over Beethoven, Shakespeare in Love), lung infection.
- Jean-Louis Schefer, 83, French art historian.
- Erasmus Schöfer, 91, German writer.
- Raivo Trass, 76, Estonian actor (Viimne reliikvia, Vana daami visiit, Tangerines), stage director and theatrical pedagogue.
- Robert M. Utley, 92, American author and historian.
- Freddy Vias, 92, Malaysian Olympic field hockey player (1956).
- Zain-ud-Din bin Abdul Wahab, 74, Malaysian Olympic sprinter (1972), respiratory disease.
- Zhou Qinzhi, 94, Chinese engineer, member of the Chinese Academy of Engineering.

=== 8 ===
- Aurora Altisent, 93, Spanish painter, drafter, and sculptor.
- Elios Andreini, 81, Italian politician.
- Jacki Apple, 80-81, American artist.
- Don Bowman, 88-89, Canadian tax judge.
- Bill Cain, 88, American sports administrator.
- Bernhard Casper, 91, German philosopher.
- Louis Crocq, 94, French military doctor and psychiatrist.
- Costică Dafinoiu, 68, Romanian boxer, Olympic bronze medallist (1976).
- Sebastian Demanop, 93, Thai-born American blind activist.
- Clive Doyle, 81, Australian Branch Davidian (Waco siege), pancreatic cancer.
- Tarhan Erdem, 89, Turkish politician, deputy (1977–1980) and minister of industry and technology (1977).
- Mladen Frančić, 67, Croatian football player and manager (Vrbovec, Podravina, Al-Watani Club).
- Rocky Freitas, 76, American football player (Detroit Lions, Tampa Bay Buccaneers).
- Revel Guest, 90, British filmmaker, journalist and author.
- Richard P. Harmond, 93, American historian and author.
- Julio Jiménez, 87, Spanish road racing cyclist, traffic collision.
- Dale W. Jorgenson, 89, American economist.
- Bruce Kent, 92, British Roman Catholic priest and activist (Campaign for Nuclear Disarmament).
- Myron Kowalsky, 80, Canadian politician, Saskatchewan MLA (1986–2007) and speaker (2001–2007).
- Lan Tianye, 95, Chinese actor (The Investiture of the Gods).
- David Lloyd-Jones, 87, British conductor.
- Ranan Lurie, 90, Egyptian-born Israeli-American political cartoonist and journalist.
- Christof May, 49, German theologian and priest (diocese of Limburg), suicide.
- Fernando Pinto Monteiro, 80, Portuguese jurist, attorney general (2006–2012), cancer.
- Romeo Morri, 70, Sammarinese politician and writer, captain regent (1992–1993) and member of the Grand and General Council (1983–2012).
- Birkha Bahadur Muringla, 79, Indian writer.
- Carmen Pedrosa, 80, Filipino journalist.
- Dame Paula Rego, 87, Portuguese-British visual artist.
- Wolfgang Reisinger, 66, Austrian jazz percussionist, ruptured aneurysm.
- Andrey Shumilin, 52, Russian Olympic wrestler (1996).
- Song Hae, 95, South Korean television host (Korea Sings) and singer.
- George Thompson, 74, American basketball player (Memphis Tams, Milwaukee Bucks), complications from diabetes.
- Joe Vinen, 92, British physicist (quantization of superfluid vorticity, quantum turbulence).
- Vladimir Yegorov, 83, Russian politician, governor of Kaliningrad Oblast (2001–2005).

=== 9 ===
- Mark Shandii Bacolod, 37, Filipino film director (Fidel, Ben & Sam) and producer (Culion).
- Billy Bingham, 90, Northern Irish football player (Sunderland, national team) and manager (Plymouth Argyle).
- Aloísio Sinésio Bohn, 87, Brazilian Roman Catholic prelate, bishop of Novo Hamburgo (1980–1986) and Santa Cruz do Sul (1986–2010).
- Giuseppe Brizi, 80, Italian football player (Maceratese, Fiorentina) and manager (Fermana).
- Nikolai Chuzhikov, 84, Russian Olympic sprint canoeist.
- Commander Tom, 59, German DJ and record producer.
- Julee Cruise, 65, American singer ("Falling", "If I Survive"), musician and actress (Twin Peaks), suicide by asphyxiation.
- Ron Farmer, 86, Guernsey footballer (Nottingham Forest, Coventry City, Notts County).
- Dan Goldstein, 67, Romanian-born Israeli entrepreneur, co-founder of Formula Systems.
- James C. Hayes, 76, American politician, mayor of Fairbanks, Alaska (1992–2001), first African-American mayor in Alaska.
- Fumihiro Himori, 73, Japanese politician, MP (2000–2003, 2005–2009).
- Aamir Liaquat Hussain, 50, Pakistani journalist and politician, MNA (2002–2007, since 2018).
- Billy Kametz, 35, American voice actor (JoJo's Bizarre Adventure, Pokémon, Attack on Titan), colon cancer.
- Maxine Kline, 92, American baseball player (Fort Wayne Daisies).
- Biruta Lewaszkiewicz-Petrykowska, 94, Polish lawyer, judge of the Constitutional Tribunal (1997–2006).
- Oleg Moliboga, 69, Russian volleyball player and coach, Olympic champion (1980).
- Chris Nangoi, Papua New Guinean politician, MP (since 2017).
- Ladislav Olejník, 90, Czech ice hockey player (HC Kometa Brno) and coach (EC Bad Nauheim).
- Ryeley Palfi, 19, Canadian bodybuilder and fitness influencer, motorcycle crash.
- Don Perkins, 84, American football player (Dallas Cowboys).
- Shauneille Perry, 92, American stage director and playwright.
- Donald Pippin, 95, American theatre musical director, Tony winner (1963).
- Rekandar Nageswara Rao, 73, Indian actor and stage director.
- Thurman D. Rodgers, 87, American military information and communications officer, oversaw installation of MSE for military.
- Gordon M. Shepherd, 88, American neuroscientist.
- Ronni Solbert, 96, American artist, photographer and illustrator (The Pushcart War).
- Eva Steininger-Bludau, 70, German politician, member of the Landtag of North Rhine-Westphalia (2010–2017).
- Ewonne Winblad, 85, Swedish journalist.
- Matt Zimmerman, 87, Canadian-British actor (Thunderbirds, A Man for All Seasons, Haunted Honeymoon).
- Zou Jing, 86, Chinese engineer, member of the Chinese Academy of Engineering.

=== 10 ===
- Jean-Jacques Barthe, 85, French politician, deputy (1973–1988), mayor of Calais (1971–2000).
- Billel Benhammouda, 24, Algerian footballer (USMM Hadjout, USM Alger), traffic collision.
- Baxter Black, 77, American cowboy poet and veterinarian, leukemia.
- Stuart Carlson, 66, American editorial cartoonist (Milwaukee Journal Sentinel).
- Zoltán Dörnyei, 62, Hungarian-born British linguist.
- Harry Gesner, 97, American architect, complications from cancer.
- Viliami Hingano, 47, Tongan politician, MP (2014–2017, since 2021), governor of Haʻapai (2021).
- Bobby Hope, 78, Scottish football player (West Bromwich Albion, national team) and manager (Bromsgrove Rovers).
- George Izo, 84, American football player (Washington Redskins, Detroit Lions, Pittsburgh Steelers).
- Vladimir Kuzyutkin, 74, Russian volleyball coach (women's national team).
- Antonio La Forgia, 77, Italian politician, president of Emilia-Romagna (1996–1999) and of the Emilia-Romagna Legislative Assembly (2000–2005), deputy (2006–2013).
- Richard Lewis, 86, English Anglican priest, dean of Wells (1990–2003).
- Väinö Markkanen, 93, Finnish sports shooter, Olympic champion (1964), heart attack.
- François Meyer, 88, French brigadier general.
- Ken Munechika, 86, American colonel and aerospace engineer.
- Sharon Oster, 73, American economist and academic administrator (Yale School of Management), cancer.
- Kenneth Parker, 77, New Zealand cricketer.
- Richard Prosser, 55, New Zealand politician, MP (2011–2017).
- Kazimierz Rynkowski, 88, Polish politician and lawyer, mayor of Gdańsk (1981–1989).
- David C. Schwartz, 83, American politician, member of the New Jersey General Assembly (1978–1992).
- Jorge Spedaletti, 74, Argentine-born Chilean footballer (Universidad de Chile, Everton, national team).
- Joe Staton, 74, American baseball player (Detroit Tigers).
- Nils Thornander, 64, Swedish-born French visual artist and music composer.
- Shelby G. Tilford, 85, American atmospheric spectroscopist.
- Sotirios Trambas, 92, Greek Orthodox prelate, metropolitan of Korea (2004–2008).
- Aarno Turpeinen, 51, Finnish footballer (OTP, HJK, national team).
- Pravin Varaiya, 82, American electrical engineer and academician (University of California, Berkeley).
- Heinz Wolfram, 87, German Olympic speed skater (1960).

=== 11 ===
- Bernd Bransch, 77, German footballer (HFC Chemie, FC Carl Zeiss Jena, East Germany national team), Olympic champion (1976).
- Michel Cosson, 90, French businessman, president of Automobile Club de l'Ouest (1992–2003).
- Hilary Devey, 65, English businesswoman and television personality (Dragons' Den).
- Igor Dudinsky, 75, Russian artist and art critic.
- Hein Eersel, 100, Surinamese academic administrator, chancellor of the University of Suriname (1968–1988).
- Stanislav Fišer, 90, Czech actor (Lost Children, Nesmrtelná teta, Andělská tvář) and voice actor.
- Tarek Al-Ghoussein, 60, Kuwaiti visual and performance artist.
- Duncan Hannah, 69, American visual artist, heart attack.
- Josh Jensen, 77, American winemaker.
- Osayomore Joseph, 69, Nigerian musician.
- Corinna Kunze, 58, German Olympic handball player.
- Yuri Mamonov, 64, Russian politician, deputy (2000–2003). (body discovered on this date)
- Sikandar Ali Mandhro, 78, Pakistani politician, senator (since 2018) and Sindh MPA (1993–1999, 2002–2018), kidney cancer.
- Théophile Nata, 75, Beninese politician, Minister of Foreign Affairs (1990–1991).
- Ravi Paranjape, 86, Indian painter and illustrator.
- Vitaly Prilukov, 83, Russian military officer and politician, member of the Supreme Soviet of Russia (1990–1993).
- Peter Reusse, 81, German actor (The Adventures of Werner Holt, Denk bloß nicht, ich heule, Frau Venus und ihr Teufel).
- Loretta Rogers, 83, English-born Canadian philanthropist, director of Rogers Communications (since 1979).
- Peter Scupham, 89, British poet.
- Donald Singer, 67, British clinical pharmacologist, president of the Fellowship of Postgraduate Medicine.
- Kumiko Takizawa, 69, Japanese voice actress (Tetsujin 28-go, Ojamajo Doremi, Wedding Peach), heart attack.

=== 12 ===
- Gabe Baltazar, 92, American jazz alto saxophonist and woodwind doubler.
- Edward T. Begay, 87, American politician, speaker of the Navajo Nation Council (1999–2003).
- Phil Bennett, 73, Welsh rugby union player (Barbarians, Llanelli, national team).
- Patrick Breuzé, 69, French journalist and writer.
- Roman Bunka, 70, German oud player and composer, cancer.
- H. T. Chen, 74, Chinese-American dancer and choreographer.
- Frederick Cuming, 92, English landscape painter.
- Roger Dadoun, 94, French philosopher and academic.
- Alain Dupas, 76, French astronomer and astrophysicist.
- Wale Fanu, 72, Nigerian film producer.
- Robert O. Fisch, 97, Hungarian-born American pediatrician, artist, and author.
- Jeffery Gifford, 75, American politician, member of the Maine House of Representatives (2006–2014, since 2020), cancer.
- Sylvie Granger, French historian.
- Philip Baker Hall, 90, American actor (Magnolia, Zodiac, Rush Hour), emphysema.
- Ron Hope, 68, British police officer.
- Heidi Horten, 81, Austrian art collector.
- Kim Hak-song, 69, South Korean politician, MP (2000–2012).
- Vello Lään, 85, Estonian sport journalist, writer, and radio broadcaster.
- Gerhard Lehmbruch, 94, German political scientist.
- Helga Lopez, 69, German politician, MP (2005–2009).
- Kurt Markus, 75, American photographer, complications from Parkinson's disease and Lewy body dementia.
- Věslav Michalik, 59, Czech politician, mayor of Dolní Břežany (since 2004).
- Dawit Nega, 34, Ethiopian singer and musician.
- D. Philip, 79, Indian actor and film producer (Kolangal).
- Lukša Poklepović, 77, Croatian footballer (Hajduk Split, Beveren).
- Hunter Reynolds, 62, American visual artist and AIDS activist, squamous cell carcinoma.
- Miryam Romero, 59, Spanish journalist and television presenter, leukemia.
- Jim Ryan, 76, American politician, attorney general of Illinois (1995–2003).
- Terry Sanderson, 75, British secularist and gay rights activist, bladder cancer.
- Meghan Stabile, 39, American music promoter, suicide.
- Jacques Villain, 88, French physician.
- Mitsugu Watanabe, 94, Japanese politician, MP (1979–1983).
- Buster Welch, 94, American cutting horse trainer.
- Yu Chongwen, 98, Chinese geochemist, member of the Chinese Academy of Sciences.

=== 13 ===
- Gloria Allen, 76, American transgender activist, respiratory failure.
- Franklin Anangonó, 47, Ecuadorian football player (El Nacional, national team) and manager (Allianza Cotopaxi).
- Gérard Bonal, 81, French writer and biographer.
- Noel Campbell, 72, Irish footballer (Fortuna Köln, St Patrick's Athletic, Shamrock Rovers).
- Hari Chand, 69, Indian Olympic long-distance runner (1976, 1980).
- Melody Currey, 71, American politician, member of the Connecticut House of Representatives (1993–2006).
- Nikolaos Deligiorgis, 85, Greek magazine editor and publisher.
- Cosimo Di Lauro, 48, Italian mobster (Di Lauro clan).
- Volker Duschner, 76, German Olympic fencer (1968, 1972).
- Bill Field, 95, American politician, member of the New Hampshire House of Representatives (2002–2006).
- Alexander G. Fraser, 85, British-American computer scientist.
- Henri Garcin, 94, Belgian actor (Someone Behind the Door, Verdict, The Pink Panther).
- Theresia Haidlmayr, 66, Austrian politician and disability rights activist, MP (1994–2008).
- Maureen Hiron, 80, British games designer (Continuo) and bridge player.
- Grover Hudson, 82, American linguist.
- Marina Lambraki-Plaka, 83, Greek historian, archaeologist, and academic, director of the National Gallery (1992–2022).
- Julio Lencina, 83, Argentine cinematographer and producer (Verónico Cruz).
- Martha Levisman, 89, Argentine architect and historian.
- Anatoly Mikhaylov, 85, Russian hurdler, Olympic bronze medalist (1964).
- Akeem Omolade, 39, Nigerian footballer (Treviso, Torino, Novara).
- Carlos Ortiz, 85, Puerto Rican Hall of Fame boxer, world super lightweight (1959–1960) and WBA/WBC lightweight champion (1962–1965, 1965–1968).
- Giuseppe Pericu, 84, Italian politician, deputy (1994–1996), mayor of Genoa (1997–2007).
- John Rigby, 79, Australian swimmer, Olympic bronze medallist (1960).
- Rolando Serrano, 83, Colombian footballer (Cúcuta Deportivo, América de Cali, national team).
- Georges Weill, 88, French archivist and historian.

=== 14 ===
- Bill Ashurst, 74, English rugby league footballer (Wigan, Penrith Panthers, Great Britain national team) and coach.
- Arshad Ayub, 93, Malaysian academician and educator.
- William Lawrence Banks, 84, British banker.
- Abd al-Karim Barjas, Iraqi politician, governor of Anbar (2003–2004).
- Rodrigo Orlando Cabrera Cuéllar, 84, Salvadoran Roman Catholic prelate, bishop of Santiago de María (1983–2016).
- Johan Cullberg, 88, Swedish psychiatry professor.
- Gabino Díaz Merchán, 96, Spanish Roman Catholic prelate, bishop of Guadix (1965–1969) and archbishop of Oviedo (1969–2002).
- Hermann Fillitz, 98, Austrian art historian.
- Mary Griffin, 96, American politician, member of the New Hampshire House of Representatives (since 1996).
- Gene Kenney, 94, American soccer coach (Michigan State Spartans).
- Dalimil Klapka, 89, Czech actor.
- Aleksander Mackiewicz, 77, Polish politician and economist, minister of internal market (1989–1991).
- Missill, 42, French disc jockey, cancer.
- Bearcat Murray, 89, Canadian Hall of Fame athletic trainer (Calgary Flames).
- Everett Peck, 71, American animator (Duckman, Squirrel Boy, The Critic), complications from pancreatic cancer.
- Simon Perchik, 98, American poet.
- Ondrej Rigo, 66, Slovak serial killer and necrophile.
- Femi Soyinka, 85, Nigerian dermatologist.
- Vladimir Stepanov, 95, Russian politician and diplomat, ambassador to Finland (1973–1979), first secretary of the Karelian Regional Committee (1984–1989).
- Joel Whitburn, 82, American author and music historian (Billboard).
- Davie Wilson, 85, Scottish football player (Rangers, Dundee United, national team) and manager.
- A. B. Yehoshua, 85, Israeli writer (The Lover, A Late Divorce), cancer.

=== 15 ===
- Maureen Arthur, 88, American actress (How to Succeed in Business Without Really Trying, The Love God?, A Man Called Dagger).
- Jim Boyer, 71, American sound engineer (Billy Joel).
- Chang Wen-i, 73, Taiwanese politician, member of the Legislative Yuan (1993–2002).
- Cho Min-ho, 35, South Korean ice hockey player (Anyang Halla, 2018 Olympic team), lung cancer.
- Robert Dumontois, 80, French Olympic rower.
- Juan Pablo Echeverri, 43, Colombian artist, malaria.
- Friedrich Haag, 91, German politician, member of the Landtag of Baden-Württemberg (1967–1992).
- Udo Hild, 79, German Olympic rower (1968, 1972).
- Jay Hopler, 51, American poet, prostate cancer.
- Jan Klijnjan, 77, Dutch footballer (Sparta Rotterdam, Sochaux, national team).
- Enda McGowan, 75, Irish Gaelic footballer (Cavan, Ulster).
- Kazue Morisaki, 95, Japanese poet and writer, respiratory failure.
- Gopi Chand Narang, 91, Indian literary critic.
- Frederick Nolan, 91, British writer and editor.
- Philippe Nozières, 90, French physicist.
- Moss O'Connell, 87, Irish Gaelic footballer and hurler (Abbeydorney GAA, Kerry GAA).
- John Parkes, 83, English cricketer (Free Foresters) and army officer.
- Gordon Peters, 95, English actor (Dad's Army, Are You Being Served?, One Foot in the Grave).
- David Power, 77, American tennis player.
- Mercedes Rico, 77, Spanish diplomat and politician.
- Arnold Skolnick, 85, American graphic artist (Woodstock).
- Peter Scott-Morgan, 64, English-American roboticist, complications from motor neurone disease.
- Tauno Timoska, 90, Finnish Olympic field hockey player (1952).
- K. K. Veerappan, 77, Indian politician, Tamil Nadu MLA (1996–2001).
- Sikota Wina, 90, Zambian politician, minister of health (1964) and information (1968–1973) and three-time MP.

=== 16 ===
- Don Allen, 84, American golfer.
- Steinar Amundsen, 76, Norwegian sprint canoeist, Olympic champion (1968).
- Artigas Barrios, 84, Uruguayan politician, deputy (2000–2005) and intendant of Rocha Department (2005–2015), pneumonia.
- Big Rude Jake, 57, Canadian musician, small-cell carcinoma.
- Michael Black, 96, British literary critic and author.
- Tony Boskovic, 89, Australian soccer referee.
- John Sears Casey, 91, American politician, member of the Alabama House of Representatives (1959–1967).
- García Castany, 73, Spanish footballer (Barcelona, Zaragoza).
- Richie Crean, 63, Irish Gaelic footballer.
- Maria Lúcia Dahl, 80, Brazilian actress (Macunaíma).
- Michel David-Weill, 89, American investment banker, chairman of Lazard (1977–2001).
- Yuri Fedotov, 74, Russian politician, deputy minister of foreign affairs (2002–2005), ambassador to the UK (2005–2010) and executive director of the UNODC (2010–2019).
- Ivonne Haza, 83, Dominican operatic soprano (Eduardo Brito National Theater).
- M. Henry Jones, 65, American artist and filmmaker.
- Michael Stephen Kanne, 83, American jurist, judge on the U.S. Court of Appeals for the Seventh Circuit (since 1987).
- Ken Knowlton, 91, American computer scientist and artist, inventor of BEFLIX.
- Peter Mackridge, 76, British Hellenist and historian.
- Antonio Montero Moreno, 93, Spanish Roman Catholic prelate and journalist, bishop of Badajoz (1980–1994) and archbishop of Mérida-Badajoz (1994–2004).
- J. Paul Morrison, 84, British-born Canadian software architect.
- Don Neely, 86, New Zealand cricket historian, player (Wellington, Auckland) and administrator, president of New Zealand Cricket (2006–2009).
- Mike Pratt, 73, American basketball player (Kentucky Colonels), coach (Charlotte 49ers), and sportscaster (Kentucky Wildcats), colon cancer.
- Tim Sale, 66, American comic book artist (Batman: The Long Halloween, Batman: Dark Victory, Superman for All Seasons), kidney failure.
- Tyler Sanders, 18, American actor (Just Add Magic: Mystery City), accidental fentanyl overdose.
- Vittorio Sega, 87, Italian politician, senator (1979–1987).
- Lexie Tynan, 89, Irish Olympic sprinter (1952).
- Rino Vernizzi, 75, Italian bassoonist.
- Gary Witherspoon, 78, American anthropologist.

=== 17 ===
- Muzamil Abdullayev, 80–81, Azerbaijani winemaker and politician, minister of food and agriculture (1993–1994).
- Bakht Baidar, 72, Pakistani politician, member of the Khyber Pakhtunkhwa Assembly (since 2013), cardiac arrest.
- Manuel Bennett, 100, American artist.
- Flavio Roberto Carraro, 90, Italian Roman Catholic prelate, bishop of Arezzo-Cortona-Sansepolcro (1996–1998) and Verona (1998–2007).
- Damian Casey, 29, Irish hurler (Eoghan Ruadh, Dungannon, Tyrone).
- Rosemary Catacalos, 78, American poet, cancer.
- Gary Collins, 86, Canadian ice hockey player (Toronto Maple Leafs).
- Sid Ahmed Ferroukhi, 54, Algerian politician, deputy (2017–2019), cardiac arrest.
- Ray Greene, 83, American college football player and coach (Jacksonville Sharks, North Carolina Central, Alabama A&M).
- Dave Hebner, 73, American professional wrestling referee and manager (WWE, TNA).
- Sigurd Hofmann, 78, German physicist.
- Eiko Kaneta, 79, Japanese politician, member of the House of Representatives (1993–2005).
- Ahmad Mahdavi Damghani, 95, Iranian literary scholar.
- Hugh McElhenny, 93, American Hall of Fame football player (San Francisco 49ers, Minnesota Vikings, New York Giants).
- John Mountford, 88, Australian politician, MP (1980–1990).
- Richard I. Neal, 79, American general.
- Bruno Pedron, 78, Italian Roman Catholic prelate, bishop of Jardim (1999–2007) and Ji-Paraná (2007–2019).
- Paul Ruffner, 73, American basketball player (Chicago Bulls).
- W. T. P. Simarmata, 67, Indonesian politician, senator (since 2019).
- Malcolm Skilbeck, 89, Australian educator, vice-chancellor of Deakin University (1986–1991).
- Wilson Stone, 69, American politician, member of the Kentucky House of Representatives (2009–2021).
- Marlenka Stupica, 94, Slovenian children's book illustrator.
- Nicole Tomczak-Jaegermann, 77, Polish-Canadian mathematician.
- Jean-Louis Trintignant, 91, French actor (A Man and a Woman, Z, Amour), director and racecar driver.
- Valentin Uritescu, 81, Romanian actor (The Conjugal Bed, The Last Assault, Sand Cliffs), complications from Parkinson's disease.
- Ken Williams, 83, American songwriter ("Everybody Plays the Fool").
- Lynn Wright, 69, American politician, member of the Mississippi House of Representatives (since 2020), complications from amyotrophic lateral sclerosis.
- Zhang Siqing, 89, Chinese politician, vice chairperson of the CPPCC (1998–2008) and procurator-general (1993–1998).

=== 18 ===
- Hans-Dieter Bader, 84, German operatic tenor (Staatsoper Hannover).
- Pierre Baldi, 103, French painter.
- Giorgio Barbolini, 88, Italian footballer (Reggiana, Roma, Padova).
- Alberto Bozzato, 92, Italian Olympic rower (1952).
- Clair Branch, 85, American football player (Saskatchewan Roughriders, Edmonton Eskimos).
- David Cervantes, 62, Mexican politician, deputy (1997–2000).
- Mariano Díez Moreno, 72, Spanish politician, deputy (1983–1987), president of the Provincial Deputation of Toledo (1987–1991).
- Constantin Eftimescu, 70, Romanian footballer (Dinamo București, Victoria București, Delta Tulcea).
- René-Nicolas Ehni, 87, French writer and playwright.
- Anita Ekström, 79, Swedish actress (Jänken, A Handful of Love, Children's Island).
- Uffe Ellemann-Jensen, 80, Danish politician, minister of foreign affairs (1982–1993), prostate cancer.
- István Encsi, 79, Hungarian Olympic hammer thrower.
- Merran Esson, 72, Australian ceramicist.
- Gian Pietro Felisatti, 72, Italian music producer, composer, and songwriter ("Il mare calmo della sera", "Sei bellissima").
- Marie-Rose Gaillard, 77, Belgian racing cyclist.
- Werner Heine, 85, German footballer (BFC Dynamo, 1. FC Union Berlin, East Germany national team).
- Chuck MacNeil, 77, Canadian politician, Nova Scotia MLA (1984–1993).
- Tony Mitton, 71, English writer, acute myeloid leukemia.
- Adibah Noor, 51, Malaysian singer and actress (Mukhsin, Talentime, Crayon), ovarian cancer.
- Aleksei Parshin, 79, Russian mathematician.
- Margot Peters, 89, American author and biographer.
- Nelson Proença, 71, Brazilian businessman and politician, deputy (1991–2011).
- Lennie Rosenbluth, 89, American basketball player (Philadelphia Warriors).
- Rémi Sainte-Marie, 84, Canadian Roman Catholic prelate, bishop of Dedza (2000–2006) and archbishop of Lilongwe (2007–2013).
- Mamadou Sarr, 83, Senegalese Olympic sprinter (1968).
- Wilma Schmidt, 95, German operatic soprano (Staatsoper Hannover).
- Mark Shields, 85, American political commentator (PBS NewsHour, Capital Gang, Inside Washington), kidney failure.
- Ilka Soares, 89, Brazilian actress (Iracema), lung cancer.
- Anne F. Sutton, 79, British historian.
- Ronnie Theseira, 92, Malaysian Olympic fencer (1964).
- Barry Wappett, 87, Australian Olympic baseball player.
- Dave Wickersham, 86, American baseball player (Kansas City Athletics, Detroit Tigers, Pittsburgh Pirates).

=== 19 ===
- Gennady Burbulis, 76, Russian politician, first deputy prime minister (1991–1992) and MP (1994–2007).
- Wim Dik, 83, Dutch politician and businessman, state secretary for economic affairs (1981–1982).
- David Froom, 70, American composer.
- Charlotte Furth, 88, American historian and scholar.
- Ken Fyffe, 84, Australian footballer (North Melbourne).
- Colin Grainger, 89, English footballer (Sheffield United, Sunderland, national team).
- José García Pérez, 86, Spanish writer and politician, deputy (1977–1982), cancer.
- Ritzi Jacobi, 80, Romanian textile artist.
- Leonie Kotelawala, 78, Sri Lankan actress (Ekamath Eka Rateka).
- Oleh Kutsyn, 56, Ukrainian military officer, shot.
- J. H. A. Lokin, 77, Dutch law professor.
- Ed Lothamer, 80, American football player (Kansas City Chiefs).
- Cecelia Eaton Luschnig, 80, American classics scholar, cancer.
- Jean-Louis Martin, 82, French Olympic equestrian.
- Donald McCurdy, 92, American politician, member of the Pennsylvania House of Representatives (1967–1974).
- Carol Raye, 99, British-Australian actress (Strawberry Roan, Waltz Time, Green Fingers).
- Clela Rorex, 78, American civil servant, issued first same-sex marriage license, complications from surgery.
- Jim Schwall, 79, American blues musician (Siegel–Schwall Band).
- Noriyuki Sekine, 91, Japanese politician, councillor (1991–1998).
- Stephen Sinatra, 75, American cardiologist.
- Thalis Tsirimokos, 62, Greek football player (PAS Giannina, OFI) and manager (Ethnikos Piraeus).
- Brett Tuggle, 70, American keyboardist (Fleetwood Mac, David Lee Roth) and songwriter ("Just Like Paradise"), cancer.
- Bob Turner, 87, American politician, member of the Texas House of Representatives (1991–2003).
- Luigino Vascon, 65, Italian politician, deputy (1996–2006).
- Tim White, 68, American professional wrestling referee (WWE).

=== 20 ===
- Regimantas Adomaitis, 85, Lithuanian actor (Feelings, Faktas, The Trust That Went Bust).
- Alphonse Allain, 97, French poet.
- Sture Allén, 93, Swedish linguist, permanent secretary of the Swedish Academy (1986–1999).
- Paul Angstadt, 83, American politician, member of the Pennsylvania House of Representatives (1983–1992) and mayor of Reading, Pennsylvania (1996–2000).
- Jordi Bonet i Armengol, 97, Spanish architect, construction manager of the Sagrada Família (1987–2012).
- James M. Bardeen, 83, American physicist.
- Dennis Cahill, 68, American guitarist (The Gloaming).
- Liam Cahill, 72, Irish civil servant and journalist.
- James Drees, 91, American politician, member of the Iowa House of Representatives (1995–2001).
- Paul M. Ellwood Jr., 95, American pediatrician.
- Kurt Equiluz, 93, Austrian operatic tenor (Vienna State Opera).
- Shaimaa Gamal, 42, Egyptian TV presenter (exact date unknown).
- Stefan Geosits, 94, Austrian Roman Catholic priest and historian.
- Hal Gilson, 80, American baseball player (St. Louis Cardinals, Houston Astros).
- Eddie Hopson, 50, American boxer, complications from pancreatitis.
- Thomas O'Riordan, 84, Irish Olympic long-distance runner (1964).
- Gianmario Pellizzari, 77, Italian farmer and politician, deputy (1976–1992).
- Mauricio Quiroga, 30, Argentine racing cyclist, suicide.
- Eldar Salayev, 88, Azerbaijani physician, president of the Azerbaijan National Academy of Sciences (1983–1997).
- Aang Hamid Suganda, 79, Indonesian politician, regent of Kuningan (2003–2013).
- Caleb Swanigan, 25, American basketball player (Purdue Boilermakers, Portland Trail Blazers, Sacramento Kings).
- Józef Walaszczyk, 102, Polish leatherworker and businessman.
- Xiong Qingquan, 94, Chinese politician, governor of Hunan (1985–1989) and delegate to the NPC (1988–1993).

=== 21 ===
- Ernest Abuba, 74, American actor (12 Monkeys, King of New York, Article 99).
- Sir Peter Barter, 82, Australian-born Papua New Guinean businessman and politician, governor of Madang Province (1997–2002).
- J. R. Bishop, 84, American football coach (Wheaton Thunder).
- Patrizia Cavalli, 75, Italian poet.
- Harvey Dinnerstein, 94, American figurative artist.
- Jaylon Ferguson, 26, American football player (Baltimore Ravens, Louisiana Tech Bulldogs), accidental drug overdose.
- Pedro Gallina, 73, Argentine footballer (Ferro Carril Oeste, Lota Schwager, Everton).
- Erich Heckelmann, 87, German politician, member of the Landtag of North Rhine-Westphalia (1978–1980, 1981–1996).
- Duncan Henderson, 72, American film producer (Master and Commander: The Far Side of the World, Oblivion, Space Jam: A New Legacy), pancreatic cancer.
- Artie Kane, 93, American pianist, film score composer (Eyes of Laura Mars, Night of the Juggler, Wrong Is Right) and conductor.
- Trevor LeGassick, 86, American scholar and translator.
- Franklin B. Mann, 81, American politician, member of the Florida House of Representatives (1974–1982) and senate (1982–1986).
- Pierre Narcisse, 45, Cameroonian-born Russian singer and actor (The Barber of Siberia), complications from kidney surgery.
- Brig Owens, 79, American football player (Dallas Cowboys, Washington Redskins).
- Birgit Pohl, 68, German athlete, Paralympic champion (1996, 2000).
- Chantal Poupaud, 82, French film director, producer, and screenwriter (Seventh Heaven, Under the Sand).
- David Pugh, British actor (Loving Memory, Burke & Hare, The Sex Thief). (death announced on this date)
- James Rado, 90, American actor (Lions Love), playwright and composer (Hair), Grammy winner (1969).
- Nikos Salikas, 81, Greek politician, MP (1989–1993).
- Jaroslav Škarvan, 78, Czech handball player, Olympic silver medalist (1972).
- Dragan Tomić, 86, Serbian politician, acting president (1997), president of the National Assembly (1994–2001).
- Alipasha Umalatov, 95, Russian politician, leader of the Dagestan ASSR (1967–1978).
- Polycarpose Zacharias, 51, Indian Jacobite Syrian Orthodox prelate, metropolitan of the Church (since 2012), heart attack.

=== 22 ===
- Patrick Adams, 72, American record producer, music arranger and composer (The Universal Robot Band, Musique).
- Xhevdet Bajraj, 62, Kosovar poet and screenwriter, lung cancer.
- Jimmy Bryant, 93, American singer.
- Marilu Bueno, 82, Brazilian actress (Better Days Ahead, Lua de Cristal, The Man of the Year), complications from abdominal surgery.
- Yves Coppens, 87, French anthropologist (Lucy).
- L. Patrick Devlin, 83, American lecturer and author.
- Paulo Diniz, 82, Brazilian singer.
- Clovis Gagnon, 96, Canadian politician, Quebec MNA (1953–1960).
- Donald Gemmell, 89, New Zealand Olympic rower (1956).
- Alec Head, 97, French racehorse trainer and breeder.
- Alexander Jefferson, 100, American Air Force officer (Tuskegee Airmen).
- Robert A. Katz, 79, American film and television producer (Gettysburg, Selena, Introducing Dorothy Dandridge), lung cancer.
- Danuza Leão, 88, Brazilian actress (Entranced Earth), journalist (Folha de S.Paulo) and writer, respiratory failure.
- Willie Morrow, 82, American businessman and inventor (afro pick).
- Jonny Nilsson, 79, Swedish speed skater, Olympic champion (1964).
- Celestino Pérez, 74, Puerto Rican Olympic swimmer.
- Gerd Grønvold Saue, 92, Norwegian writer.
- Tony Siragusa, 55, American football player (Indianapolis Colts, Baltimore Ravens), television host (Man Caves) and actor.
- Bruton Smith, 95, American Hall of Fame motorsports promoter (Speedway Motorsports).
- Bernie Stolar, 75, American video game industry executive, president of Mattel (1999–2005).
- Jüri Tarmak, 75, Estonian high jumper, Olympic champion (1972).
- Graham Tutt, 65, English footballer (Charlton Athletic, Atlanta Chiefs, Georgia Generals).
- Gerardo Clemente Vega, 82, Mexican military officer, secretary of national defence (2000–2006).
- Carlos Vera, 93, Chilean Olympic athlete (1948, 1952).

=== 23 ===
- Rex Austin, 91, New Zealand politician, MP (1975–1987).
- Bernard Belle, 57, American musician, music producer and songwriter ("I Like the Way (The Kissing Game)", "Remember the Time"), congestive heart failure.
- Gianpaolo Bissi, 81, Italian politician, senator (1987–1992).
- Henri Elendé, 80, Congolese Olympic high jumper (1964).
- Ernane Galvêas, 99, Brazilian economist and politician, president of the Central Bank of Brazil (1968–1974, 1979–1980), minister of economy (1980–1985).
- Arkady Gartsman, 75, Ukrainian songwriter (Treasure Island), screenwriter and actor.
- Sally Greengross, Baroness Greengross, 86, British politician, member of the House of Lords (since 2000).
- Ernst Jacobi, 88, German actor (The Big Chance, The Day the Rains Came, The Tin Drum).
- Stien Kaiser, 84, Dutch speed skater, Olympic champion (1972).
- Ko Tin-lung, 69, Hong Kong actor (July Rhapsody), film producer (I Have a Date with Spring) and presenter.
- Liang Junwu, 88, Chinese materials scientist, member of the Chinese Academy of Sciences.
- Ove Malmberg, 89, Swedish Olympic ice hockey player (1956).
- Rima Melati, 84, Indonesian actress (Laki-Laki Tak Bernama, Wadjah Seorang Laki-laki, Max Havelaar).
- Peter Molnar, 78, American geophysicist.
- Massimo Morante, 69, Italian guitarist (Goblin).
- Tommy Morgan, 89, American harmonica player.
- Alain Plantefol, 79, French rugby union player (Racing 92, SU Agen, national team).
- Leo Posada, 88, Cuban baseball player (Kansas City Athletics), pancreatic cancer.
- Yuri Shatunov, 48, Russian singer (Laskovyi Mai), heart attack.
- Cho Soon, 94, South Korean politician, MP (1998–2000).
- John F. Stack, 71, American political scientist.
- Paula Stafford, 102, Australian fashion designer.
- Francis Tulloch, 81, Jamaican politician, two-time MP and minister of tourism (1997–1999).
- Mahmut Ustaosmanoğlu, 93, Turkish Islamic scholar, imam of İsmailağa (1954–1996), infection.
- Joan van der Waals, 102, Dutch physicist.
- Leluț Vasilescu, 66, Romanian drummer.
- Jean Waline, 88, French academic and politician.
- Chumei Watanabe, 96, Japanese composer (Mazinger Z, Steel Jeeg), heart failure.

=== 24 ===
- Edward Abramoski, 88, American athletic trainer (Buffalo Bills).
- Neil Chandler, 73, Australian footballer (Carlton, St Kilda).
- Chris Denning, 81, English DJ and convicted sex offender, diabetes.
- Suzanne Deuchler, 92, American politician, member of the Illinois House of Representatives (1981–1999).
- HolLynn D'Lil, 77, American disability rights activist.
- Finn Døssing, 81, Danish footballer (Viborg, Dundee United, Aalborg).
- Harry Gration, 71, English journalist and broadcaster (Look North).
- Wayne LeBombard, 78, American Olympic speed skater.
- Ulf Lönnqvist, 85, Swedish politician, minister for sports, youth and tourism (1986–1989) and housing (1988–1991).
- Lawrence Moss, 94, American composer.
- Bruce Nelson, 81, American historian, Lewy body dementia.
- Maria Nichiforov, 71, Romanian Olympic sprint canoer.
- Fatikh Sibagatullin, 72, Russian politician, deputy (2007–2021).
- Nathan Sivin, 91, American linguist and historian.
- Lee C. Teng, 95, Chinese-born American theoretical physicist.
- Janna Thompson, 79, American-born Australian philosopher and ethicist.
- Carol Vance, 88, American district attorney.
- Peter Waddington, 85, Australian Olympic rower.
- Zhang Sizhi, 94, Chinese human rights activist.

=== 25 ===
- Michael Baker-Harber, 76, British Olympic sailor (1976).
- Bill Bell, 74, American football player (Atlanta Falcons, New England Patriots).
- Javier Cárdenas, 69, Mexican footballer (Deportivo Toluca, Guadalajara, national team).
- Peter Denz, 82, German engineer, inventor and entrepreneur.
- Sam Gilliam, 88, American painter, kidney failure.
- Alberto Gurrola, 29, Mexican footballer (Lobos BUAP, Cimarrones de Sonora).
- Louis Ken-Kwofie, 53, Ghanaian football player (New York Red Bulls) and manager (Ramapo College), pancreatic cancer.
- Liselotte Kobi, 92, Swiss Olympic swimmer.
- John Leefe, 80, Canadian politician, Nova Scotia MHA (1978–1999).
- John Manningham-Buller, 2nd Viscount Dilhorne, 90, English hereditary peer and barrister.
- Elena Marttila, 99, Russian painter.
- Christine McElwee, 75, New Zealand politician and historian.
- Arie Pais, 92, Dutch politician, senator (1977, 1981–1982) and minister of education and sciences (1977–1981).
- Dietmar Streitler, 58, Austrian Olympic wrestler (1984).
- Russell Watt, 86, New Zealand rugby union footballer (Otago, Wellington, national team).
- Kim Weber, 76, Finnish Olympic sailor (1972).
- Bernhard Wessel, 85, German footballer (Borussia Dortmund).
- Bill Woolsey, 87, American swimmer, Olympic champion (1952).

=== 26 ===
- Thomas Bewley, 95, British-Irish psychiatrist.
- Thue Christiansen, 82, Greenlandic visual artist and politician, designer of the flag of Greenland and minister of education (1979–1983).
- Don Cullen, 89, Canadian actor, comedian and writer.
- Frank D'Accone, 91, American musicologist.
- Yuri Gorobets, 90, Russian actor (Come Tomorrow, Please..., Investigation Held by ZnaToKi, Air Crew).
- Paul Hartnett, 94, American politician, member of the Nebraska Legislature (1985–2005).
- Hans Hollmann, 89, Austrian director and actor.
- Bruce R. Katz, 75, American entrepreneur (Rockport), injuries sustained in a fall.
- Yurii Krasylnikov, Ukrainian military aviator, shot down.
- Margaret Keane, 94, American painter, subject of Big Eyes, heart failure.
- Jerzy Kopa, 79, Polish football player and manager (Stal Stalowa Wola, Lech Poznań, Pogoń Szczecin).
- V. Krishnamurthy, 97, Indian civil servant.
- Raffaele La Capria, 99, Italian writer and screenwriter (Hands over the City, Many Wars Ago).
- Abraham Lavender, 81, American sociologist.
- Mary Mara, 61, American actress (Nash Bridges, ER, A Civil Action), drowned.
- Mykhailo Matiushenko, 61, Ukrainian military aviator, shot down.
- Timothy J. McCann, 78, English archivist.
- Frank Moorhouse, 83, Australian author (Dark Palace, Cold Light) and screenwriter (The Coca-Cola Kid).
- Frank Williams, 90, English actor (The Army Game, Dad's Army, You Rang, M'Lord?).

=== 27 ===
- Renato Ascencio León, 83, Mexican Roman Catholic prelate, territorial prelate of Madera (1988–1994) and bishop of Ciudad Juárez (1994–2014).
- Sir Colin Blakemore, 78, British neurobiologist.
- Marlin Briscoe, 76, American football player (Buffalo Bills, Miami Dolphins, Denver Broncos), pneumonia.
- Bob Brown, 79, American football player (Ottawa Rough Riders, BC Lions).
- Leonardo Del Vecchio, 87, Italian eyewear industry executive, founder of Luxottica, pneumonia.
- Albert Derrick, 82, English footballer (Hereford United), throat cancer.
- Mildred Reason Dube, Zimbabwean politician, senator (since 2018).
- Fina García Marruz, 99, Cuban poet.
- Jack Gordon, 94, Canadian ice hockey general manager (Minnesota North Stars, Vancouver Canucks), coach and player (New York Rangers).
- Fred Hyatt, 75, American football player (St. Louis Cardinals, New Orleans Saints, Washington Redskins), complications from heart surgery.
- Giles Mutsekwa, 73, Zimbabwean politician, minister of home affairs (2009–2013).
- Teruyoshi Nakano, 86, Japanese special effects artist (Godzilla vs. Hedorah, Zone Fighter, Princess from the Moon), sepsis.
- Nick Nemeroff, 32, Canadian comedian.
- Jay Octeau, 57, American ice hockey player (Boston University Terriers).
- Frederick S. Pardee, 89, American economist.
- Michael C. Stenger, 71, American law enforcement officer, sergeant at arms of the United States Senate (2018–2021).
- Jean-Hervé Stievenart, 67, French triple jumper.
- Mats Traat, 85, Estonian poet and writer.
- Joe Turkel, 94, American actor (The Shining, Blade Runner, Paths of Glory), liver failure.
- Wu Jin-yun, 84, Taiwanese Olympic athlete (1960).

=== 28 ===
- Cüneyt Arkın, 84, Turkish actor (The Mine, Dünyayı Kurtaran Adam, Paramparça), film director, and producer, cardiac arrest.
- Martin Bangemann, 87, German politician, MP (1972–1980, 1987–1989) and federal minister of economics of West Germany (1984–1988).
- Christine Dranzoa, 55, Ugandan academic administrator and biologist.
- Dennis Egan, 75, American broadcaster (KINY) and politician, member of the Alaska Senate (2009–2019) and mayor of Juneau (1995–2000).
- Neville Hayes, 78, Australian swimmer, Olympic silver medalist (1960).
- Katja Husen, 46, Turkish-born German biologist and politician, member of the Hamburg Parliament (2004–2008), traffic collision.
- Dame Deborah James, 40, English journalist (You, Me and the Big C), bowel cancer.
- Gary Jerke, 74, American politician, member of the South Dakota House of Representatives (2005–2008).
- Sergey Korepanov, 74, Russian politician.
- Ian Verner Macdonald, 97, Canadian trade diplomat and entrepreneur.
- T. Sivadasa Menon, 90, Indian politician, Kerala MLA (1987–2001).
- Pallonji Mistry, 93, Indian-born Irish businessman, chairman of the Shapoorji Pallonji Group.
- Malcolm Neesam, 76, English historian and writer.
- Hichem Rostom, 75, Tunisian actor (The English Patient, The Magic Box, The Flower of Aleppo).
- Asao Sano, 96, Japanese actor (Season of the Sun, The Last Samurai, The Funeral).
- Ryuzo Sasaki, 65, Japanese politician, MP (1993–2000, 2005–2012), heart attack.
- Scope, 4, Irish racehorse, euthanised.
- Mike Schuler, 81, American basketball coach (Portland Trail Blazers, Los Angeles Clippers).
- Varinder Singh, 75, Indian field hockey player, Olympic bronze medallist (1972).
- Rolf Skoglund, 81, Swedish actor (Vi hade i alla fall tur med vädret, Fångarna på fortet, Jönssonligan spelar högt), cancer.
- John Visentin, 59, American business executive, CEO of Xerox (since 2018).
- Kaiwan Wattanakrai, 71, Thai voice actor.
- Dennis Wilson, 101, British war poet.

=== 29 ===
- Bill Allen, 85, American businessman, CEO of VECO Corporation.
- Sonny Barger, 83, American biker, author and actor (Sons of Anarchy), co-founder of the Hells Angels, cancer.
- Kenward Elmslie, 93, American poet.
- Adolf Fehr, 81, Liechtenstein Olympic alpine skier.
- David Weiss Halivni, 94, Israeli-American rabbi.
- Manikavagasam Harichandra, 91, Malaysian Olympic middle-distance runner (1956).
- Alfredo Hernández Raigosa, 59, Mexican politician and social activist, deputy (2000–2003).
- John Hutton, 93, British author.
- Neil Kerley, 88, Australian footballer (West Adelaide, South Adelaide, Glenelg), traffic collision.
- Manfred Krafft, 84, German football player (Fortuna Düsseldorf) and manager (Karlsruher SC, FC Kaiserslautern).
- Eeles Landström, 90, Finnish pole vaulter and politician, MP (1966–1972), Olympic bronze medalist (1960).
- Peter B. Lowry, 81, American folklorist, musicologist, and record label owner (Trix Records).
- María Rosa de Madariaga, 85, Spanish historian.
- Yehuda Meshi Zahav, 62, Israeli social activist, co-founder of ZAKA, suicide by hanging.
- Agate Nesaule, 84, Latvian-born American author (A Woman in Amber).
- Jim Pappin, 82, Canadian ice hockey player (Toronto Maple Leafs, Chicago Blackhawks, California Golden Seals), Stanley Cup champion (1964, 1967).
- Suzanne Pepper, 83, American-born Hong Kong author and political scientist.
- Emma Previato, 69, Italian-born American mathematician.
- Miklós Szabó, 93, Hungarian Olympic long-distance runner (1956, 1960).
- Hershel W. Williams, 98, American Marine Corps warrant officer, Medal of Honor recipient (1945).
- Anthony M. Villane, 92, American politician, member of the New Jersey General Assembly (1976–1988).

=== 30 ===
- Rolando Andaya Jr., 53, Filipino politician, secretary of budget and management (2006–2010), twice member and deputy speaker (2016–2018) of the House of Representatives.
- Marcus Fairs, 54, British magazine editor, founder of Dezeen.
- Jean-Guy Gendron, 87, Canadian ice hockey player (Philadelphia Flyers, New York Rangers, Boston Bruins), assisted suicide.
- Zulfikar Ghose, 87, Pakistani-American novelist and poet.
- R. Ross Holloway, 87, American archaeologist.
- Tatsuaki Iwata, 96, Japanese Go player.
- Satinder Kumar Lambah, 80, Indian diplomat.
- Lynn Lynch, 92, American football player (Chicago Cardinals).
- Claire McNab, 82, Australian author (Orginator), complications from Parkinson's disease.
- Muriel Phillips, 101, American World War II veteran and writer.
- Gerald Schweighart, 84, American politician, mayor of Champaign, Illinois (1999–2011).
- Bill Squires, 89, American track and field coach (Greater Boston Track Club).
- Dmitry Stepushkin, 46, Russian Olympic bobsledder (2002, 2006, 2010).
- Indulata Sukla, 78, Indian mathematician.
- Technoblade, 23, American YouTuber, metastatic sarcoma. (death announced on this date)
- Brian Tomlinson, 81, Australian footballer (South Melbourne).
- Wayne Wagner, 76, American politician.
- William E. Winkler, 75, American statistician.
- Vladimir Zelenko, 49, Ukrainian-born American physician, cancer.
- Kazimierz Zimny, 87, Polish athlete, Olympic bronze medalist (1960).
