= John Parkes =

John Parkes may refer to:

- John Parkes (bishop) (1950–2025), Australian Anglican bishop
- John Parkes (cricketer) (1938–2022), English cricketer and British Army officer
- John Gabriel Parkes (1917–2002), managing director & chairman of Lever Brothers

== See also ==
- John Parks (disambiguation)
