= Josh Jensen =

Josh Jensen may refer to:

- Josh Jensen (winemaker)
- Josh Jensen (politician)
