= Friedrich Haag (politician) =

German politician (1930–2022)

Member of the Landtag of Baden-Württemberg
- In office 1967–1992

Personal details
- Born: 14 September 1930 Stuttgart, Württemberg, Germany
- Died: 15 June 2022 (aged 91) Stuttgart, Baden-Württemberg, Germany
- Party: FDP
- Education: Karls-Gymnasium Stuttgart

Friedrich Haag (14 September 1930 – 15 June 2022) was a German politician. A member of the Free Democratic Party, he served in the Landtag of Baden-Württemberg from 1967 to 1992.

Haag died in Stuttgart on 15 June 2022 at the age of 91.
