= Jean Waline =

French academic and politician (1933–2022)

Member of the Municipal Council of Strasbourg
- In office 1989–1995
- In office 1977–1983

General Councillor of the Canton of Strasbourg-4
- In office 1988–2008
- Preceded by: Marcel Rudloff
- Succeeded by: Olivier Bitz

Personal details
- Born: 18 August 1933 Thionville, France
- Died: 23 June 2022 (aged 88) Strasbourg, France
- Party: RPR
- Occupation: Professor

Jean Waline (18 August 1933 – 23 June 2022) was a French academic and politician.

== Biography ==
Jean was the son of jurist and academic Marcel Waline, who served on the Constitutional Council. He earned an agrégation in law and became a law professor at Robert Schuman University.

In 2002, Waline was the subject of Mélanges offerts à Jean Waline, published by Dalloz as part of the "Précis Dalloz" on administrative law. He was a member of the scientific council of the Fondation Louise Weiss. He was also president of the International Institute of Human Rights from 2005 to 2011.

A member of the Rally for the Republic, Waline was described as "a formidable swordsman in search of [...] broad popular recognition" as a politician. He was at the forefront of the fight for the LGV Est high-speed rail line while serving as Vice-President of the General Council of Bas-Rhin with an appeal to the Prime Minister and a petition. Having entered politics in 1977, he experienced a surprise defeat against socialist Olivier Blitz in the 2008 French cantonal elections.

Jean Waline died in Strasbourg on 23 June 2022 at the age of 88.

== Awards ==
- Commander of the Ordre national du Mérite (2007)
- Commander of the Legion of Honour (2012)

== Publications ==
=== Books ===
- Précis de droit administratif
- Les Établissements de santé privés à but non lucratif
- Gouverner, administrer, juger - Liber amicorum
- Notes d'arrêts de Marcel Waline

=== Articles ===
- "Le Médiateur est admirablement placé pour détecter les failles de notre système législatif et réglementaire"
- "Le rôle du juge administratif dans la détermination de l'utilité publique justifiant l'expropriation"
- "Les révisions de la Constitution de 1958"
- "À propos de la loi Constitutionnelle du 28 mars 2003"
- "Le rejet par la France de la Constitution européenne"
