= Patrick Breuzé =

French journalist and writer (1953–2022)

- Born: 7 January 1953; Versailles, France
- Died: 12 June 2022 (aged 69); France
- Education: Paris-Sud University; Institut pratique du journalisme
- Occupations: Journalist; Writer

Patrick Breuzé (7 January 1953 – 12 June 2022) was a French journalist and writer.

== Works ==
- La Vallée des loups (2002)
- Le Silence des glaces (2004)
- La Grande Avalanche (2005)
- La Malpeur (2007)
- La Lumière des cimes (2009)
- Les Remèdes de nos campagnes (2011)
- La Montagne effacée (2011)
- La Valse des nuages (2012)
- L’Étoile immobile (2014)
- Mon fils va venir me chercher (2016)
- La Montagne pour refuge (2017)
- La Jeune Fille qui déplaçait les montagnes (2019)
- Bout d'chien (2020)
- Les Buveurs de ciel (2021)
