= Peter Mackridge =

British philologist and academic (1946–2022)

Peter Mackridge (12 March 1946 - 16 June 2022) was a British Hellenist and historian who served as Professor of Modern Greek at the University of Oxford.

== Life ==
He was born in Harpenden, Hertfordshire and studied French and Modern Greek in Oxford. He spent a lot of time in Greece for the purpose of completing his PhD about the Greek novel of the 1930s. In 1973 he was appointed a lecturer of Modern Greek Language and Literature at the University of London and in 1981 he moved to Oxford University initially as lecturer and then, in 1996, as professor of Modern Greek and Literature until his retirement in 2003.

In March 2022 he was declared an honorary citizen of the Hellenic Republic.

He specialized in the period since 1750 and he had published many works, including translations, and papers about Greek language and literature, particularly regarding Dionysios Solomos and Constantine P. Cavafy. He is well known for his book The Modern Greek Language, 1985.
