= John Parks =

John Parks may refer to:

- John Alexander Parks, British painter
- John Michael Parks, Canadian politician

== See also ==
- John Park (disambiguation)
