= Michael Black (literary critic) =

British writer (1928–2022)

- Born: Michael Hugo Black; 7 June 1928; Tempsford, Bedfordshire
- Died: 16 June 2022 (aged 94)
- Occupations: Writer, publisher

Michael Hugo Black (7 June 1928 – 16 June 2022) was a British author and literary critic who held the position of university Publisher at Cambridge University Press.

== Early life and education ==
Black was born in 1928 in Tempsford, Bedfordshire. His parents, Norman Black and Frances Best, were both dental surgeons, originally from Scotland. He grew up in Falmouth, where he attended the local grammar school and, under the advice of his headmaster, sat the scholarship exam for Cambridge. He was awarded a minor scholarship to Jesus College, Cambridge. He graduated with a first in Modern Languages and English in 1951.

== Career ==
After military service in Austria, Black was appointed assistant secretary in September 1951. From 1965 until 1978 he held the role of chief editor, and from that time until his retirement in 1987, he held the title of University Publisher. Throughout his career Black's special interest was in developing the Press's English literature list. Black was a follower of F.R. Leavis and published the reprints of Leavis' journal Scrutiny. He was also editor of The Cambridge Quarterly. Among the many achievements of Cambridge publishing in his time, was the edition of the complete works of D.H. Lawrence, an author on whom he wrote four titles. He is a fellow of Clare Hall, Cambridge.

== Publications ==
Black was active as a writer in the latter half of the twentieth century, primarily as a literary critic. His publications include:

- The Literature of Fidelity London : Chatto & Windus, 1975.
- Poetic Drama as Mirror of the Will London : Vision Press, 1977.
- Cambridge University Press: 1584-1984 Cambridge : Cambridge University Press, 1984.
- D.H. Lawrence: the early fiction: a commentary Basingstoke : Macmillan, 1986.
- D.H. Lawrence: the early philosophical works: a commentary London : Macmillan, 1991.
- D.H. Lawrence, Sons and Lovers Cambridge : Cambridge University Press, 1992.
- Lawrence's England: the major fiction, 1913-20 Basingstoke : Palgrave in association with St Antony's, Oxford, 2001.
- Learning to be a publisher: Cambridge University Press 1951-1987. Personal reminiscences Privately published, 2011
