= Elena Marttila =

Russian painter (1923–2022)

Elena Oskarovna Marttila (Russian: Еле́на Оска́ровна Мартти́ла, 6 January 1923 – 25 June 2022) was a Russian painter of Finnish descent. Marttila is best known on her sketches of the Siege of Leningrad and the Road of Life, also found in the 2008 book Leningrad: State of Siege by the British historian Michael K. Jones and in the illustrated album Unofficial Art of the Second World War. Elena Marttila. Pavel Afonin. Sergey Babkov. Personal History and Memory (Kriga, 2020) by Ksenia Afonina.

Marttila was born in Petrograd, Soviet Union to the family of the Finnish-born military officer Oskar Marttila (1898–1938) and the Russian factory worker Evdokiya Vasiliyevna. Her father had fought for the Red Guards in the Finnish Civil War and fled to the Soviet Russia in 1921. Oskar Marttila became a major of the Red Army but died as a victim of the Great Purge.

Elena Marttila studied at the Repin Institute of Arts and graduated in 1941. During the Siege of Leningrad, she served as a nurse at a children's hospital dedicated to Nadezhda Krupskaya. After the war, Marttila graduated from the Tavricheskaya Art School in 1948. She worked as a graphic designer and art teacher until 1978. In 1981, Marttila became a member of the Artists' Union of the USSR.

Since 1996, Marttila lived in Kotka, Finland, where she died at the age of 99 in June 2022.
