= Yu Chongwen =

Chinese scientist (1924–2022)

- 於崇文
- Born: 15 February 1924; Shanghai, China
- Died: 12 June 2022 (aged 98); Beijing, China
- Education: National Southwestern Associated University; Peking University
- Scientific career
- Fields: Geochemistry
- Workplaces: China University of Geosciences

Yu Chongwen (Chinese: 於崇文; pinyin: Yū Chóngwén; 15 February 1924 – 12 June 2022) was a Chinese scientist who was a professor at the China University of Geosciences, and an academician of the Chinese Academy of Sciences.

== Biography ==
Yu was born in Shanghai, on 15 February 1924, while his ancestral home is in Ningbo, Zhejiang. He secondary studied at Shanghai Nanyang High School. In 1944, he entered National Southwestern Associated University and graduated from the Department of Geology, Peking University in 1950. He stayed at the university and worked as an assistant after graduation. In 1952, he joined the faculty of China University of Geosciences, where he founded the Department of Geochemistry later and was promoted to professor in 1980.

On 12 June 2022, he died from an illness in Beijing, at the age of 98.

== Honours and awards ==
- 1988 State Science and Technology Progress Award (Second Class) for ore controlling conditions, material composition and distribution of tungsten, lead, zinc and other non-ferrous rare metal deposits in Nanling area
- 1995 Member of the Chinese Academy of Sciences (CAS)

== Publication ==
- 成矿作用动力学 [Dynamics of Ore-forming Processes] (in Chinese). Beijing: Geological Publishing House. 1998. ISBN 9787116023710.
