= Muriel Phillips =

American veteran (1921–2022)

- Born: Muriel Rose Phillips; January 12, 1921; Meriden, Connecticut, U.S.
- Died: June 30, 2022 (aged 101); Laguna Woods, California, U.S.
- Occupation: Nurse
- Spouse(s): Melvin Engelman (died 2020)

Muriel Rose Phillips (January 12, 1921 – June 30, 2022) was an American military veteran, writer, and public speaker who was widely recognised for her service as a United States Army nurse during World War II.

== Wartime service ==
=== Enlistment ===
Phillips was in her final year of nurse training at Cambridge Hospital in Cambridge, Massachusetts, when Pearl Harbor was bombed. Immediately after finishing her training, Phillips enlisted in the armed services as an army nurse. Her army training at Fort Devens, Massachusetts, was even more rigorous than nursing training: she endured hours of drills, 15-mile hikes, classroom study of diseases, and crawling under live ammunition.

=== Deployment ===
Phillips was deployed for Great Britain, and served in Wales for six months. After this, her assignment was moved to the English Channel to care for those wounded after the invasion of Normandy. The mission of Phillips's unit was to set up a tent hospital outside of Liége, Belgium to treat Allied soldiers. Work in a field tent was difficult at best. The nurses worked without running water or electricity, and the dirt floors of the tents often turned to mud.

After a month at Liége, the Germans began a bombing campaign to destroy railroad tracks nearby. Bombs came roughly every fifteen minutes for two straight months, sometimes falling on parts of the tent hospital. Despite the horrors of work on the battlefield, Phillips got much satisfaction from treating the GIs.

=== The Battle of the Bulge ===
In December 1944, with the Battle of the Bulge, the hospital became even more crowded and busy. Phillips's hospital was one of the closest to the fighting lines. The oncoming German forces were particularly threatening for Phillips, as she was Jewish. On Christmas Eve, the Germans were only ten miles from Liége, and the hospital began the evacuation procedure. The hospital where Phillips worked was specifically targeted, and many servicemen and women died due to German antipersonnel bombs. Phillips survived the Battle of the Bulge, and the war ended months later.

== After the war ==
Phillips and the entire hospital unit were awarded a European Theater ribbon and medal for their service, as well as three battle stars. Phillips was finally discharged in January 1946 as a first lieutenant.

In 2008, Phillips published her memoirs, Mission Accomplished: Stop the Clock which included eleven chapters dedicated to her wartime experiences.

Phillips was awarded the Legion of Honour, France's highest honor. Her husband, Melvin Engelman, predeceased her in 2020, aged 99. Phillips died in Laguna Woods, California, in June 2022, at the age of 101. Her death was announced nearly a month later.
