= Gianmario Pellizzari =

Italian farmer and politician (1944–2022)

Member of the Chamber of Deputies of Italy
- In office 5 July 1976 – 22 April 1992
- Constituency: Venice

Personal details
- Born: 19 December 1944 Cerea, Italy
- Died: 20 June 2022 (aged 77)
- Party: DC
- Occupation: Farmer

Gianmario Pellizzari (19 December 1944 – 20 June 2022) was an Italian farmer and politician.

A member of the Christian Democracy party, he served in the Chamber of Deputies from 1976 to 1992.

Pellizzari died on 20 June 2022 at the age of 77.
