= Bakht Baidar =

Pakistani social worker and former MPA politician (1950–2022)

Bakht Baidar Khan

Member of the Khyber Pakhtunkhwa Assembly
- In office 2013 – 17 June 2022
- President: Asif Ali Zardari
- Prime Minister: Nawaz Sharif
- Constituency: PK-97 (Dir Lower-IV)

Personal details
- Born: 1 January 1950 Dir Lower, Khyber Pakhtunkhwa, Pakistan
- Died: 17 June 2022 (aged 72)
- Party: Qaumi Watan Party
- Website: http://qwp.org.pk

Bakht Baidar (Urdu: بخت بیدار; 1 January 1950 – 17 June 2022) was a Pakistani social worker and politician from Khyber Pakhtunkhwa.

== Political career ==
Baidar served as the secretary general of Qaumi Watan Party, which granted him a ticket for contesting elections on the PK-97 seat in the May 2013 general elections. He won by securing 10912 votes against Jamaat-e-Islami Pakistan candidate who secured 7528 votes.

He took oath as a Minister in the PTI led provincial government on 13 June 2013.

== Minister of Industries, Commerce & Labour 2013 ==
Baidar was sacked in November 2013 just after a few months because of poor performance. QWP accused PTI of saving its own ministers at the cost of others and pledged to sit in opposition and play their role as opposition.

== Attack on Guest House ==
There were multiple attacks on the guest house of Bakht Baidar. The deadliest attack left six people dead and wounded four on the night of Eid Ul Fitr 2014. The funeral prayers of the dead were offered on Eid day, thus turning Eid into mourning. The dead included Muhammad Ishaq (brother of Bakht Baidar) and two policemen.

== See also ==
- PK-97 (LOWER DIR-IV)
