= Zhou Qinzhi =

Chinese engineer (1927–2022)

- 周勤之
- Born: 23 November 1927; Shanghai, China
- Died: 7 June 2022 (aged 94); Shanghai, China
- Education: China Industrial and Commercial College
- Scientific career
- Fields: Manufacturing technology and equipment for machinery
- Workplaces: Donghua University; Shanghai Machine Tool Works

Zhou Qinzhi (Chinese: 周勤之; pinyin: Zhōu Qínzhī; 23 November 1927 – 7 June 2022) was a Chinese engineer, and an academician of the Chinese Academy of Engineering. He was one of the founders of fluid bearing in China.

== Biography ==
Zhou was born in Shanghai, on 23 November 1927, while his ancestral home is in Shangyu District of Shaoxing, Zhejiang. In 1950, he graduated from China Industrial and Commercial College. He was a professor at Donghua University and senior engineer at Shanghai Machine Tool Works.

On 7 June 2022, he died from an illness in Shanghai, at the age of 94.

== Honours and awards ==
- 1995 Member of the Chinese Academy of Engineering (CAE)
