= Georges Weill (historian) =

French archivist and historian (1934–2022)

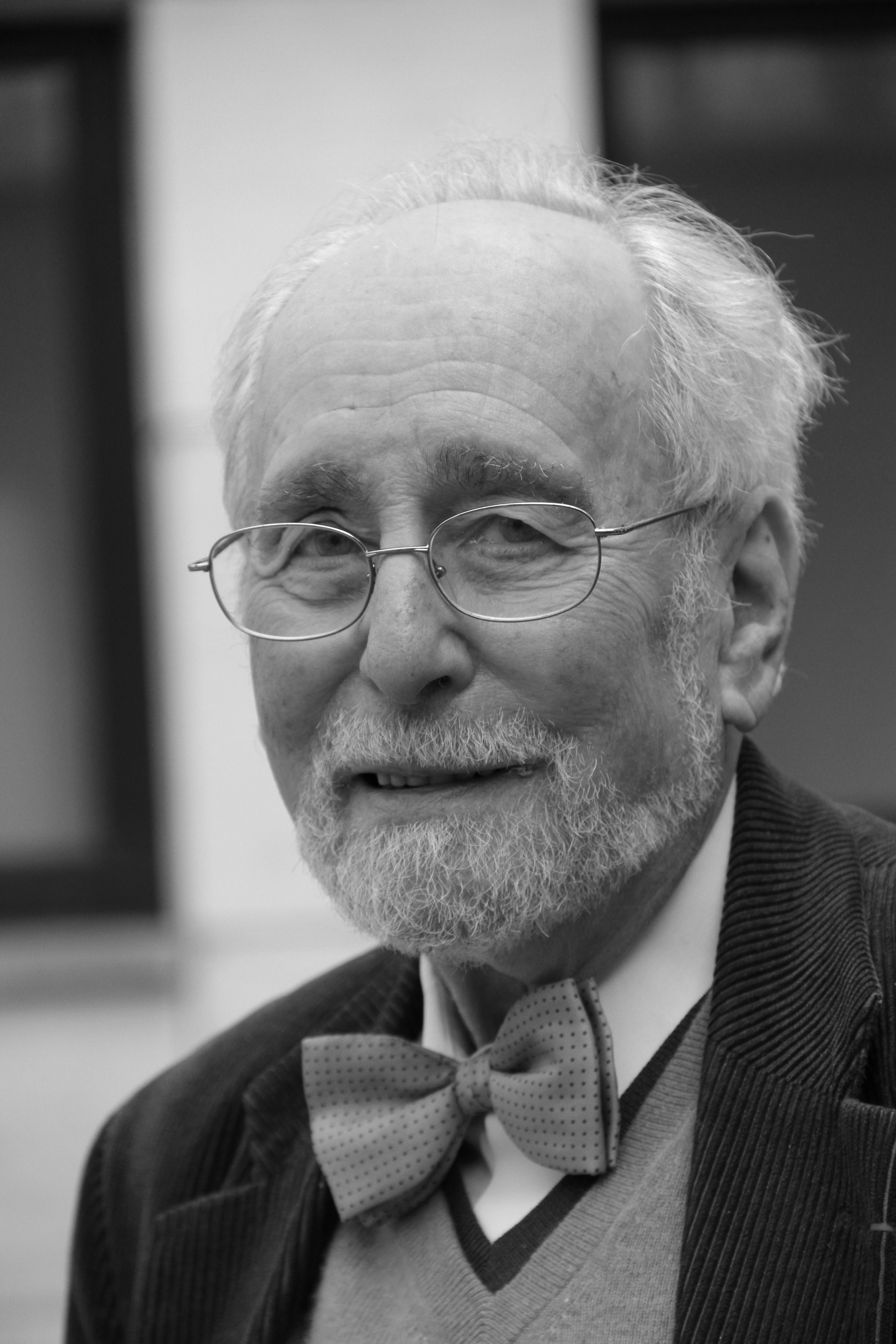
- Weill in 2013
- Born: 31 January 1934; Strasbourg, France
- Died: 14 June 2022 (aged 88); Neuilly-sur-Seine
- Education: École Nationale des Chartes
- Occupations: Archivist; Historian

Georges Weill (31 January 1934 – 14 June 2022) was a French archivist and historian. He was a heritage curator and honorary president of the Société des études juives. He co-founded the Commission française des Archives Juives in 1962 alongside Bernhard Blumenkranz, Gérard Nahon, and Gilbert Cahon. He was Inspector-General of the French Interministerial Service of Archives from 1989 to 1996 and curator of the library of the Alliance Israélite Universelle from 1958 to 1989. He was an archivist for the Israelite Central Consistory of France from 1967 to 1980.

Weill died in Neuilly-sur-Seine, on 14 June 2022 at the age of 88.

== Distinctions ==
- Knight of the Ordre national du Mérite (1991)
- Officer of the Ordre des Arts et des Lettres (1992)
- Knight of the Legion of Honour (1999)
