= L. Patrick Devlin =

Media and politics specialist (1939–2022)

Lawrence Patrick Devlin (April 11, 1939 – June 22, 2022) was a specialist in media and politics. Devlin was a professor of communication at the University of Rhode Island, having held the post for over thirty years until 2008, when he retired. He authored books such as Contemporary Political Speaking (1971) and Political Persuasion in Presidential Campaigns (1987).

Devlin died on June 22, 2022, at the age of 83.
