= René-Nicolas Ehni =

French writer and playwright (1935–2022)

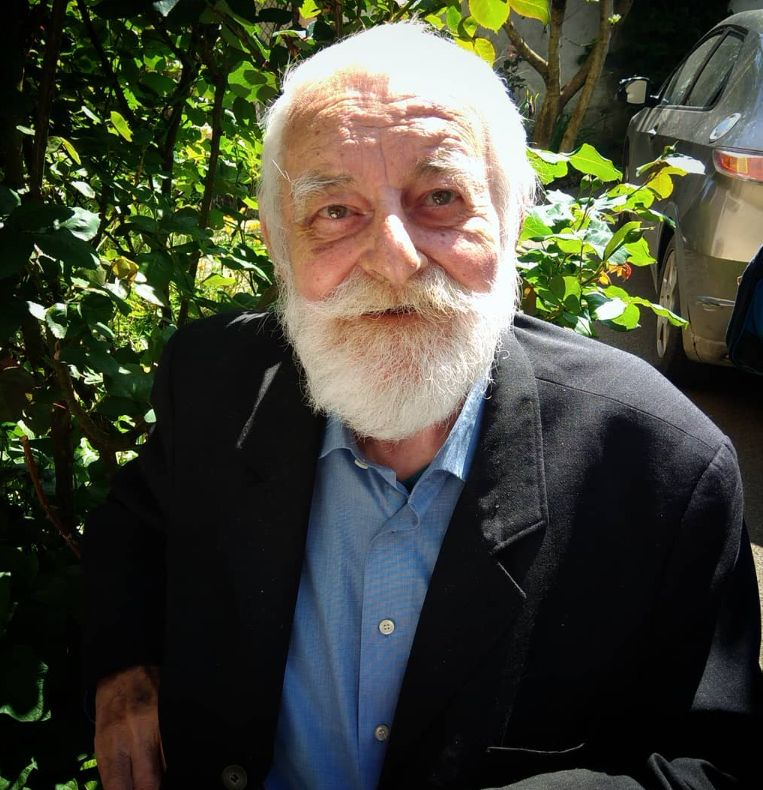
- Born: 29 April 1935; Eschentzwiller, France
- Died: 18 June 2022 (aged 87)
- Occupations: Writer, playwright

René-Nicolas Ehni (29 April 1935 – 18 June 2022) was a French writer and playwright.

== Selected publications ==
- La Gloire du vaurien, Julliard, 1963 – réédition UGE, coll. « 10/18 », 1974; Christian Bourgois, 2000.
- Que ferez-vous en novembre ? (Théâtre I), Christian Bourgois, 1968.
- Ensuite, nous fûmes à Palmyre, Gallimard, 1968.
- L'Amie Rose (Théâtre II), Christian Bourgois, 1970.
- Super-positions (Théâtre III), Christian Bourgois, 1970.
- Babylone vous y étiez, nue parmi les bananiers, Christian Bourgois, 1971 – réédition UGE, coll. «10/18», 1973; Christian Bourgois, 2000.
- Eugénie Kroponime, Christian Bourgois, 1972.
- Pintades, Christian Bourgois, 1974 – réédition Christian Bourgois, 2000.
- Jocaste, Christian Bourgois, 1976.
- La Raison lunatique. Roman du pays, coécrit avec Louis Schittly, Gallimard, coll. « Les Presses d'aujourd'hui », 1978.
- Le Mariage de Gudrun, Éditions libres Hallier, 1979.
- Côme, confession générale, Christian Bourgois, 1981.
- Rahab et les héritiers de la gloire, Strasbourg, BF, 1988.
- Vert de Gris, traité autobiographique, Strasbourg, La Nuée bleue, 1994.
- Venez, enfants de la patrie !, Strasbourg, La Nuée Bleue, 1998.
- Quand nous dansions sur la table; suivi de Lettre à Dominique, Christian Bourgois, 2000.
- Algérie-roman, Denoël, 2002.
- Chantefable, le Père, la Fille et le Saint-Ballon, Strasbourg, La Nuée bleue, 2006.
- Apnée, autobiographie, Christian Bourgois, 2008.
