= Mitsugu Watanabe =

Japanese politician (1928–2022)

- 渡辺 貢

Member of the House of Representatives
- In office 7 October 1979 – 28 November 1983
- Preceded by: Yūji Tadamatsu
- Succeeded by: Shin'ichirō Ogawa
- Constituency: Saitama 1st

Personal details
- Born: 4 March 1928 Tokyo, Japan
- Died: 12 June 2022 (aged 94) Saitama Prefecture, Japan
- Party: Communist
- Education: Chuo University

Mitsugu Watanabe (Japanese: 渡辺貢; Watanabe Mitsugu; 4 March 1928 – 12 June 2022) was a Japanese politician. A member of the Japanese Communist Party, he served in the House of Representatives from 1979 to 1983.

Watanabe died in Saitama Prefecture on 12 June 2022 at the age of 94.
