= D. Philip =

Indian actor (1943–2022)

D Philip
- Born: 1943; Thiruvalla
- Died: 12 June 2022 (aged 78–79); Thiruvananthapuram
- Occupations: Film and drama actor
- Spouse: Leelamma Philip
- Children: Anna Philip, Priya Philip
- Relatives: Daniel Saji(Grandson), Daya Davis (Granddaughter), Nida Davis (Granddaughter)

D Philip (1943 – 12 June 2022), a native of Thiruvalla in the British Raj, was a film and drama actor who worked in the Malayalam film industry.

== Career ==
Philip started his acting career as a protégé of PJ Antony, first acting in the 1980 film Pralayam. This was followed by more than 100 Malayalam films including Kottayam Kunjachan, Vettam, Artham, Pazhashiraja and Time.

He co-produced the movie Kolangal with KT Varghese, directed by KG George.

He died in a private hospital in Thiruvananthapuram on 12 June 2022.

== Awards ==
In 1986, he won the State Award for his performance in the Kalidasa Kalakendra play 'Rainbow'.
