= Manuel Bennett =

American artist (1921–2022)

Manuel Bennett (October 13, 1921 – June 17, 2022) was an American artist.

Bennett was born in Philadelphia, Pennsylvania, on October 13, 1921. He moved to Mexico City, Mexico, in 1951 under the Montgomery GI Bill to study at the Escuela Nacional de Pintura, Escultura y Grabado "La Esmeralda" under the muralists Diego Rivera and David Alfaro Siqueiros, the landscapist Dr. Atl and the sculptor Francisco Zúñiga.

Following in the tradition of his contemporaries in Mexico, the Taller de Gráfica Popular, Bennett produced mostly lithographic prints, though he also produced sculpture, which can be found in the collection of the Yeshiva University Museum.

Early in his career, Bennett played a major role in publication of the Codex Bodley Mixtec manuscripts, providing all of the color separation and capture necessary to reproduce the ancient piece.

Bennett produced public art for the cities of Encinitas, California, El Paso, Texas, Irvine, California, Hondo and Hiroshima in Japan. He also donated sculpture for awards for humanitarians including the American Heart Association.

Bennett served in the United States Army during World War II. He died on June 17, 2022, at the age of 100.
