= Liang Junwu =

Chinese scientist (1933–2022)

- 梁骏吾
- Born: 18 September 1933; Hankou, Hubei, China
- Died: 23 June 2022 (aged 88); Beijing, China
- Education: Wuhan University
- Spouse: Wen Ruimei
- Scientific career
- Fields: Semiconductor materials
- Workplaces: Institute of Semiconductors, Chinese Academy of Sciences

Chinese name
- Simplified Chinese: 梁骏吾
- Traditional Chinese: 梁駿吾
Transcriptions
Standard Mandarin
- Hanyu Pinyin: Liáng Jùnwú

Liang Junwu (Chinese: 梁骏吾; 18 September 1933 – 23 June 2022) was a Chinese scientist in the field of semiconductor materials, and an academician of the Chinese Academy of Sciences. He is known as the founder of early semiconductor silicon materials in China. He was a member of the Chinese Communist Party (CCP).

== Biography ==
Liang was born in Hankou (now Wuhan), Hubei, on 18 September 1933. In 1951, he entered Wuhan University, majoring in physics. In 1956, he was sent to study in the Soviet Union on government scholarships, earning his vice-doctorate degree from the Baykov Institute of Metallurgy, Academy of Sciences of the Soviet Union in 1960.

Liang returned to China in 1960 and that same year became assistant research fellow at the Institute of Semiconductors, Chinese Academy of Sciences. He was assistant research fellow at the Yichang Semiconductor Factory in 1970, and held that office until 1979. In 1978, he was promoted to become research fellow at the Institute of Semiconductors, Chinese Academy of Sciences.

On 23 June 2022, he died from an illness in Beijing, at the age of 88.

== Personal life ==
Liang married Wen Ruimei, who is also a research fellow at the Institute of Semiconductors, Chinese Academy of Sciences.

== Contributions ==
In the 1960s, Liang solved the key technology of high-purity zone melting silicon; In 1964, he prepared GaAs liquid phase epitaxial materials for room temperature lasers; In 1979, he successfully developed high-quality silicon zone melting single crystal without dislocation, vortex, low micro defect, low carbon and controllable oxygen for large-scale integrated circuits; In the 1980s, he initiated nitrogen doped neutron transmutation silicon single crystal, which solved the problem of silicon wafer integrity and uniformity; In early 1990s, he studied the growth of superlattice quantum well materials by metalorganic vapour-phase epitaxy, and promoted the Chinese superlattice quantum well materials to a practical level in terms of crystal integrity, electrical properties and superlattice structure control; He also played an important role in the research and industrialization of polycrystalline silicon for solar cells.

== Honours and awards ==
- 1996 State Science and Technology Progress Award (Third Class) for new methods and equipment for treatment and detection of arsenic in the environment.
- 1997 Member of the Chinese Academy of Engineering (CAE)
