= Lukša Poklepović =

Croatian footballer (1945–2022)

Lukas Poklepović
Personal information
- Date of birth: 16 February 1945
- Place of birth: Milna, FS Croatia, DF Yugoslavia
- Date of death: 12 June 2022 (aged 77)
- Place of death: Split, Croatia
- Position: Goalkeeper

Senior career*
Years	Team	Apps	(Gls)
1962–1967	Hajduk Split	26	(0)
1967–1968	Kaiserslautern		
1968–1973	Beveren	118	(0)
1973–1975	Šibenik		
1976–1977	OFI	3	(0)
1977–1978	PAS Giannina		

International career
1962	Yugoslavia U18		
- * Club domestic league appearances and goals

Lukša or Lukas Poklepović (16 February 1945 – 12 June 2022) was a Croatian footballer who played as a goalkeeper.

== Career ==
Poklepović joined his first team, HNK Hajduk Split, at the age of 19. After five seasons in the Yugoslav First League, he fled from Yugoslavia to West Germany and played for 1. FC Kaiserslautern before joining the Belgian club Beveren.

With Beveren, Poklepović participated in the 1971 Inter-Cities Fairs Cup. The club reached the round of 16 before being eliminated by Arsenal. Poklepović played all six of his team's fixtures in the competition. In 1972, the club was relegated to the Belgian Second Division, which they won the following year and were promoted. He then decided to return to Yugoslavia with HNK Šibenik, giving way to goalkeeper Jean-Marie Pfaff in Beveren, playing 145 official matches for the club. He then moved to Greece to play for OFI and PAS Giannina before retiring.

== Death ==
Poklepović died in Split on 12 June 2022 at the age of 77.
