= Nelson Proença =

Brazilian businessman and politician (1950–2022)

Member of the Chamber of Deputies of Brazil
- In office February 1991 – February 2011
- Constituency: Rio Grande do Sul

Personal details
- Born: Nelson Luiz Proença Fernandes; 14 August 1950; Porto Alegre, Brazil
- Died: 18 June 2022 (aged 71); São Paulo, Brazil
- Cause of death: COVID-19
- Political party: PMBD (1988–2001); Cidadania (since 2001)
- Education: Pontifical Catholic University of Rio Grande do Sul
- Occupation: Businessman

Nelson Luiz Proença Fernandes (14 August 1950 – 18 June 2022) was a Brazilian businessman and politician.

A member of the Brazilian Democratic Movement and Cidadania, he served in the Chamber of Deputies from 1991 to 2011.

Proença died of COVID-19 in São Paulo on 18 June 2022 at the age of 71.
