= Wale Fanu =

Nigerian TV and film producer (1952–2022)

- Born: April 21, 1950; Lagos, Nigeria
- Died: June 12, 2022 (aged 72)
- Other names: Uncle Wales
- Citizenship: Nigeria
- Occupation: Film producer

Wale Fanu (21 April 1950 – 12 June 2022), popularly known as Uncle Wales, was a veteran TV and Film producer and one of the few septuagenarians with sickle cell anaemia.

== Early life and career ==
Wale Fanu was born into Fanu family in Lagos State Nigeria and he attended St. Paul's College Zaria. He was the third child of the family, and the only one with sickle cell anaemia. The ailment was diagnosed at the age of thirteen and apart from being medically sentenced to a life not more than twenty one years, he also faced different challenges including being unable to do some activities meant for young people like playing football, hockey, cricket etc. He forwent his admission to be a pilot and also withdrew out of Technical College (now The Polytechnic), Ibadan as an Electrical Engineering student because of the adversities of the ailment. Eventually, he picked up a job at film laboratory in Ikoyi and eventually became a veteran film producer and the CEO of CINECRAFT.
