= Femi Soyinka =

Nigerian professor of dermatology (1937–2022)

- Born: 4 January 1937; Abeokuta, Colony and Protectorate of Nigeria (now Ogun State, Nigeria)
- Died: 14 June 2022 (aged 85)
- Education: Heidelberg University MBCh, MD 1964; University of Giessen 1969; Hadassah Medical Center MPH 1972
- Occupations: Researcher; Dermatologist; Venereologist; Immunologist
- Relatives: Wole Soyinka Ransome-Kuti family

Femi Soyinka (4 January 1937 – 14 June 2022) was a Nigerian professor of Dermatology and the provost of the College of Health Sciences, Obafemi Awolowo University, Ile-Ife.

== Early life and education ==
Femi Soyinka was born into the Soyinka's family in 1937. He was the younger brother of writer, Wole Soyinka. He obtained his medical degree and Doctor of Medicine in 1964 and 1965 at the University of Heidelberg In 1972, he obtained a master's degree in public health from Hadassah Medical School, (MPH) Israel.

== Career ==
He was an academician and he worked in the field for thirty years.

== Death ==
Femi Soyinka died on 14 June 2022 in his home Kukumada Village, Ibadan, Oyo State, Nigeria, at the age of 85.
