= Kim Hak-song =

South Korean entrepreneur and politician (1952–2022)

Member of the National Assembly of South Korea
- In office 30 May 2000 – 29 May 2012
- Preceded by: Heo Dae-beom
- Succeeded by: Shin Jae-sang
- Constituency: Jinhae

Personal details
- Born: 6 July 1952 Changwon, South Korea
- Died: 12 June 2022 (aged 69)
- Party: GNP
- Education: Konkuk University; Kyungnam University
- Occupation: Entrepreneur

Kim Hak-song (Korean: 김학송; 6 July 1952 – 12 June 2022) was a South Korean politician. A member of the Grand National Party, he served in the National Assembly from 2000 to 2012. Kim died on 12 June 2022 at the age of 69.
