= Michael Zeilik =

Astronomer and educator

- Born: 26 September 1946; Bridgeport, Connecticut
- Died: 3 June 2022 (aged 75)

Michael Zeilik (1946–2022) was a professor of astronomy at the University of New Mexico. His main research interests were the study of H II regions at different wavelengths; the light curves of RS Canum Venaticorum variables; and the ethnoastronomy of the Puebloans. He also wrote astronomy textbooks which were the best-selling in the world for a period. These included:

- Astronomy: The Evolving Universe
- Conceptual Astronomy
- Introduction to Astronomy & Astrophysics
