= Erich Heckelmann =

German academic and politician (1935–2022)

Member of the Landtag of North Rhine-Westphalia
- In office 29 January 1981 – 5 July 1996
- In office 17 April 1978 – 28 May 1980

Personal details
- Born: 20 February 1935 Daaden, Rhine Province, Prussia, Germany
- Died: 21 June 2022 (aged 87) Grevenbroich, North Rhine-Westphalia, Germany
- Party: SPD
- Education: University of Tübingen
- Occupation: Professor

Erich Heckelmann (20 February 1935 – 21 June 2022) was a German politician. A member of the Social Democratic Party of Germany, he served in the Landtag of North Rhine-Westphalia from 1978 to 1980 and again from 1981 to 1996.

Heckelmann died in Grevenbroich on 21 June 2022 at the age of 87.
