= Luigino Vascon =

Italian businessman and politician (1956–2022)

Member of the Chamber of Deputies of Italy
- In office 29 April 1996 – 27 April 2006
- Constituency: Veneto 1

Personal details
- Born: Luigino Mario Vascon; 13 October 1956 Sossano, Italy
- Died: 19 June 2022 (aged 65) Sossano, Italy
- Party: LN
- Occupation: Businessman

Luigino Mario Vascon (13 October 1956 – 19 June 2022) was an Italian politician.

A member of the Lega Nord, he served in the Chamber of Deputies from 1996 to 2006.

Vascon died in Sossano on 19 June 2022 at the age of 65.
