= Roger Dadoun =

French philosopher and psychoanalyst (1928–2022)

- Born: 1 January 1928; Oran, French Algeria, France
- Died: 12 June 2022 (aged 94); France
- Education: University of Algiers; University of Paris
- Occupations: Philosopher; Psychoanalyst; Translator; Art critic

Roger Dadoun (1 January 1928 – 12 June 2022) was a French philosopher, psychoanalyst, translator, and art critic. He was a professor of comparative literature at Paris Diderot University.

== Biography ==
Born in Oran, Dadoun was a student at the École Saint-André and subsequently the Lycée Lamoricière. He enrolled in the University of Algiers in 1946, where he studied philosophy, literature, and psychotechnics. He was a journalist for Alger Soir and Fraternité before studying psychology, philosophy, esthetics, and ethnology at the University of Paris. He studied under the likes of Pierre Francastel, Roland Barthes, Gaston Bachelard, George Devereux, and Jacques Lacan.

Dadoun collaborated with France Culture and the magazines Les Lettres nouvelles, Preuves, Nouvelle Revue de psychanalyse, and Les Temps modernes. He taught film analysis at the University of Vincennes and later comparative literature at Paris Diderot University. He was a visiting professor at the University of Minnesota and the University of Salento.

Roger Dadoun died on 12 June 2022 at the age of 94.

== Publications ==
- Géza Róheim et l'essor de l'anthropologie psychanalytique (1972)
- Cent fleurs pour Wilhelm Reich (1975)
- Au-delà des « Portes du rêve » : entretiens sur l'anthropologie onirique de Géza Róheim (1977)
- Freud (1982)
- Psychanalysis entre chien et loup (1984)
- De la raison ironique (1988)
- Éros de Péguy : la guerre, l'écriture, la durée (1988)
- Freud (1992)
- La violence : essai sur l'homo violens (1993)
- Les Dits d'Eros (1994)
- La psychanalyse politique (1995)
- Allah recherche l'autan perdu (1996)
- Duchamp : ce mécano qui met à nu (1996)
- Poèmes en forme de nœuds, suivis de dix haïkus un peu dénoués (1998)
- King Kong : du monstre comme démonstration (1999)
- Vieillir et jouir : feux sous la cendre (1999)
- L'Utopie, haut lieu d'inconscient : Zamiatine, Duchamp, Péguy (2000)
- Cinéma, psychanalyse et politique (2000)
- Marcel Duchamp/Enzo Nasso (2000)
- « L'Île des morts », de Böcklin : psychanalyse (2001)
- Contre la haine : l'amitié Hermann Hesse-Romain Rolland (2002)
- L'érotisme (2003)
- Manifeste pour une vieillesse ardente : grand âge, âge d'avenir (2005)
- Éloge de l'intolérance : la révolte et le siècle, 1905-2005 (2006)
- Singulières psychanalyses de Romain Rolland : l'océanique, l'abyssal, le matriciel (2006)
- Utopies sodomitiques : diagonales de l'anal (2007)
- Sexyvilisation : figures sexuelles du temps présent (2007)
- Paolo Uccello/Valentin Tereshenko (2007)
- L'Homme aux limites : essais de psychologie quotidienne (2008)
- La Télé enchaînée : pour une psychanalyse politique de l'image (2008)
- L'érotisme : de l'obscène au sublime (2010)
- Renaissante enfance : enfance écrite en lettres d'or (2011)
