= Věslav Michalik =

Czech physicist and politician (1963–2022)

Vĕslav Michalik

Member of the Central Bohemian Regional Council
- In office 13 October 2012 – 12 June 2022

Mayor of Dolní Břežany
- In office 1 October 2004 – 12 June 2022
- Preceded by: Jan Král

Personal details
- Born: 1 March 1963 Český Těšín, Czechoslovakia
- Died: 12 June 2022 (aged 59) Krásná Lípa, Czech Republic
- Party: STAN
- Education: Czech Technical University in Prague
- Occupation: Physicist

Vĕslav Michalik (1 March 1963 – 12 June 2022) was a Czech politician. A member of Mayors and Independents, he served on the Central Bohemian Regional Council from 2012 to 2022. He was also mayor of Dolní Břežany from 2004 to 2022.

== Birth ==
Michalik was born on 1 March 1963 in Český Těšín, Czechoslovakia. He graduated from the gymnasium in Český Těšín and the Faculty of Nuclear and Physical Engineering of the Czech Technical University in Prague, in 1986 he received engineer's degree.

== Death ==
Michalik died on the hill Vlčí hora in Krásná Lípa on 12 June 2022, at the age of 59.
