= John Gabriel Parkes =

John Gabriel Parkes, CBE (3 April 1917 – 3 January 2002) was a past managing director and chairman of Lever Brothers, who is best known for organizing in 1984 the first ever Tall Ships visit to Merseyside.

== Life ==
John Gabriel Parkes was born in 1917 in Staffordshire and studied aeronautical engineering at Cambridge University. After several positions, he was managing the Lever Brothers Company soap factory in Port Sunlight in Merseyside, and he went on to be appointed in 1962 as a managing director of the company. He also chaired the Liverpool Chamber of Commerce, the Industrial Development Board of the North West CBI, and the Merseyside Enterprise Forum. It was for his work with the Industrial Development Board that he was honored in the 1977 New Year Honours List by being made a Commander of the Order of the British Empire by Queen Elizabeth II.

He is best known for organizing the first Merseyside "Tall Ships" event, a popular regatta of tall-masted sailing ships that visited Merseyside in 1984, 1992, 2008, and 2012 and is scheduled for 2018, with an attendance in 2012 of over a million people. Parkes died in 2002 in Parkgate, Cheshire.
