= Missill =

French DJ (1980–2022)

- Born: Émilie Talieu; 1980
- Died: 14 June 2022 (aged 42)
- Occupations: Disc jockey Music producer

Émilie Talieu (1980 – 14 June 2022), known professionally as Missill or DJ Missill, was a French disc jockey, music producer, graffiti artist, and videographer.

== Biography ==
Born in 1980, Talieu began her artistic career with graffiti in the 1990s. Her DJing career began in the 2000s, when she collaborated with multiple artists, including Horace Andy, Vitalic, and Alain Bashung. Her style consisted of various genres, such as hip hop, dancehall, and rock. Inspired by Japanese culture, she identified her music with the expression "electro world".

Talieu also participated in the women's collective "O'Sisters", which aimed to create "positive messages of emancipation, unity and solidarity to women around the world". Her ecological activism was portrayed in the titles Climate Change and 432 MHz.

Missill died from cancer in June 2022 at the age of 42.

== Discography ==
=== Albums ===
- Targets (2008)
- Kawaii (2010)

=== Singles and EPs ===
- Glitch (2008)
- Forward (2008)
- Illegal Horny (2009)
