= Joseph Zoderer =

Italian writer (1935–2022)

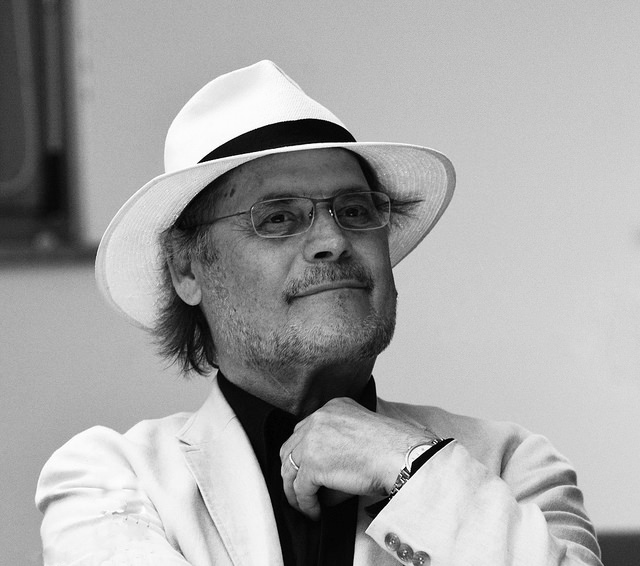
- Zoderer in 2015
- Born: Joseph Valentin Zoderer; 25 November 1935; Merano, South Tyrol, Italy
- Died: 1 June 2022 (aged 86); Bruneck, South Tyrol, Italy
- Occupation: Writer

Joseph Zoderer (25 November 1935 – 1 June 2022) was an Italian writer from South Tyrol who wrote in German.

== Personal life and death ==
Zodrer was born on 25 November 1935 in Merano, Italy.

He was an Italian writer and businessman.

He died on 1 June 2022 in Bruneck, Italy at the age of 86.
