= Aurora Altisent =

Spanish painter, draftsman, and sculptor (1928–2022)

- Born: Aurora Altisent i Balmas; 2 December 1928; Barcelona, Spain
- Died: 8 June 2022 (aged 93); Barcelona, Spain
- Citizenship: Spain
- Occupations: Painter; draftsman; sculptor

Aurora Altisent i Balmas (2 December 1928 – 8 June 2022) was a Spanish painter, draftsman and sculptor.

== Biography ==
Altisent began her artistic training with her mother Carme Balmas and later, with painters Ángel López-Obrero (1946) and Ramon Rogent (1951-1958). In 1948, she participated in numerous collective exhibitions. In 1956, she had her first individual exhibition, at the Galeries Laietanes in Barcelona. She presented her works, all of them within figuration, which already show the characteristics that were habitual in her artistic production. She evolved towards a difficult simplicity in forms, just as the line acquires prominence. In sculpture, a discipline that she practiced less frequently, she emphasized volumes and rounded masses, eliminating details.

== Illustration ==
From 1972, Altisent used drawing, with a very refined line, almost exclusively, to give expression to her new aesthetic conception. She reproduced spaces in Barcelona in great detail, becoming a chronicler of what surrounds her. Her drawings, in her exhibitions at the Sala Gaudí in Barcelona, gave rise to the books Barcelona tendra and Botigues de Barcelona, with texts by Alexandre Cirici i Pellicer, and Salons de Barcelona with texts by Josep Maria Carandell, all designed by Tony Miserachs. They have subsequently been reissued and translated into Spanish and English.

As an illustrator, Altisent published in publishing houses La Galera, Tusquets Editores, Edicions 62, Editorial Teide, Editorial Onda, Ediciones Proa, Editorial Regàs, sd Ediciones, RqueR Editorial, Lunwerg and Editorial Lumen.
