= Gianpaolo Bissi =

Italian surveyor and politician (1941–2022)

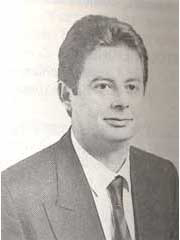

Member of the Senate of the Republic of Italy
- In office 2 July 1987 – 22 April 1992

Personal details
- Born: 2 May 1941 Teglio, Italy
- Died: 24 June 2022 (aged 81) Teglio, Italy
- Party: PSDI
- Occupation: Surveyor

Gianpaolo Bissi (2 May 1941 – 24 June 2022) was an Italian politician. A member of the Italian Democratic Socialist Party, he served in the Senate of the Republic from 1987 to 1992.

Bissi died in Teglio on 23 June 2022 at the age of 81.
