= Ed Kassian =

Canadian ice hockey player (1933–2022)

- Born: June 18, 1933 Vegreville, Alberta, Canada
- Died: June 6, 2022 (aged 88) Vegreville, Alberta, Canada
- Height: 6 ft 1 in (185 cm)
- Weight: 185 lb (84 kg; 13 st 3 lb)
- Position: Left wing
- Shot: Left
- Played for: Penticton Vees
- National team: Canada
- Playing career: 1951–1956
Medal record
Men's ice hockey
Gold medal – first place	1955 West Germany	Ice hockey

Edward Lawrence Kassian (June 18, 1933 – June 6, 2022) was a Canadian ice hockey player with the Penticton Vees. He won a gold medal at the 1955 World Ice Hockey Championships in West Germany. He also played for the Prince Albert Mintos, Saskatoon Quakers, Vancouver Canucks, New Westminster Royals, and Kamloops Elks. Kassian died in Vegreville, Alberta on June 6, 2022, at the age of 88.
