= Birkha Bahadur Muringla =

Indian writer (1943–2022)

Birkha Bahadur Muringla (13 April 1943 – 8 June 2022) was one of the eminent writers in Limbu literature from Kingdom of Sikkim, now Sikkim, India. He was awarded the Padma Shri by the Government of India in 2017 for his contribution to Limbu language and literature.
