= Mariano Díez Moreno =

Spanish jurist and politician (1949–2022)

Member of the Cortes of Castilla–La Mancha
- In office 8 May 1983 – 2 July 1987
- Constituency: Toledo

President of the Provincial Deputation of Toledo
- In office 1987–1991
- Preceded by: Isidro del Río Martín
- Succeeded by: Adolfo González Revenga

Personal details
- Born: 2 October 1949 Toledo, Spain
- Died: 18 June 2022 (aged 72) Madrid, Spain
- Party: AP
- Education: University of Salamanca
- Occupation: Jurist

Mariano Díez Moreno (2 October 1949 – 18 June 2022) was a Spanish politician.

A member of the People's Alliance, he served in the Cortes of Castilla–La Mancha from 1983 to 1987 and was president of the Provincial Deputation of Toledo from 1987 to 1991.

Díez died in Madrid on 18 June 2022 at the age of 72.
