= Pedro Gallina =

Argentine footballer (1949–2022)

Personal information
- Full name: Pedro Alfredo Gallina
- Date of birth: 30 March 1949
- Place of birth: Buenos Aires, Argentina
- Date of death: 21 June 2022 (aged 73)
- Position: Forward

Senior career*
Years	Team	Apps	(Gls)
1969–1973	Ferro Carril Oeste	26	(4)
1972–1973	→ Gimnasia LP (loan)	18	(4)
1974–1975	Lota Schwager	57	(23)
1976	Universidad Católica	29	(10)
1977–1979	Everton	43	(6)
1980	Cobresal	42	(11)
Total		215	(58)
- * Club domestic league appearances and goals

Pedro Alfredo Gallina (30 March 1949 – 21 June 2022) was an Argentine footballer who played as a forward for clubs in Argentina and Chile.

== Career ==
Gallina made his professional debut playing for Ferro Carril Oeste in a match versus All Boys on 4 April 1970. He reached to make twenty six appearances for the club until December 1972, with a step on loan to Gimnasia LP in 1973, playing eighteen matches.

In 1974, he moved to Chile to join Lota Schwager, playing 54 matches and scoring 23 goals until 1975. He became an idol of the club since it reached two of the best seasons of its history and was the runner-up of 1975 Copa Chile. In 1976 he played for Universidad Católica, becoming the team top goalscorer with ten goals. For Everton de Viña del Mar he played between 1977 and 1979, being remembered for a great goal versus Ñublense in 1978, which was chosen the best goal of the year and is considered the best goal scored at the Estadio Sausalito up to now. In 1980, he moved to Cobresal in the Chilean Segunda División, the first season as a professional club, becoming the team's top goalscorer again with 11 goals.

Following his retirement, Gallina made his home in Buenos Aires, Argentina, and died on 21 June 2022, at the age of 73.
