= Ron Hope =

Senior police officer in the United Kingdom (c. 1954–2022)

Ronald Hope (29 January 1954 – 12 June 2022) was the first non-white police officer in the United Kingdom to be promoted to the rank of inspector, on 28 December 1979.

Hope was born in South London, but grew up in Watford. His father was from Guyana and his mother was white English. He joined the Metropolitan Police in April 1973, initially posted to Lewisham. By 1979 he was a detective sergeant at Kennington. On promotion to inspector at the age of 25 he was posted to Marylebone as a uniformed officer. Hope was later promoted to chief superintendent. By 2000 he was borough commander of Islington. He died in 2022 aged 68.
