= Ritzi Jacobi =

Romanian textile artist (1941–2022)

Ritzi Jacobi (born Victoria Areclia Gavrilă; 1941 – 19 June 2022) was a Romanian textile artist.
