= John Visentin =

American executive (1962–2022)

John Visentin (October 23, 1962 – June 28, 2022) was an American executive. He was the chief executive officer of Xerox from 2018 until his death in 2022.
