= Vitaly Prilukov =

Russian military officer and politician (1939–2022)

Member of the Supreme Soviet of Russia
- In office 1990–1993

Deputy Chairman of the KGB
- In office 16 March 1991 – 28 August 1991

Personal details
- Born: Vitaly Mikhailovich Prilukov; 25 February 1939 Kazan, Tatar ASSR, Russian SFSR, Soviet Union
- Died: 11 June 2022 (aged 83) Moscow, Russia
- Party: CPSU
- Education: Perm National Research Polytechnic University
- Occupation: Military officer

Vitaly Mikhailovich Prilukov (Russian: Виталий Михайлович Прилуков; 25 February 1939 – 11 June 2022) was a Russian military officer and politician.

He was deputy chairman of the KGB from March to August 1991 and served on the Supreme Soviet of Russia from 1990 to 1993.

Prilukov died on 11 June 2022 at the age of 83.
