= Vittorio Sega =

Italian politician (1935–2022)

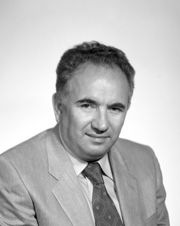

Member of the Senate of the Republic of Italy
- In office 20 June 1979 – 1 July 1987

Personal details
- Born: 8 April 1935 Adria, Italy
- Died: 16 June 2022 (aged 87) Adria, Italy
- Party: PCI

Vittorio Sega (8 April 1935 – 16 June 2022) was an Italian politician. A member of the Italian Communist Party, he served in the Senate of the Republic from 1979 to 1987.

Sega died in Adria on 16 June 2022 at the age of 87.
