= Rekandar Nageswara Rao =

Indian theatre personality (1949–2022)

- Born: 1 June 1949; Gimidi Peta, Srikakulam district, Andhra Pradesh, India
- Died: 9 June 2022 (aged 73); Serilingampally, Hyderabad, India
- Occupation: Theatre personality
- Awards: Sangeet Natak Akademi Award (2011); Padma Shri (2013)

Rekandar Nageswara Rao, popularly known as Surabhi Babji (1 June 1949 – 9 June 2022) was an Indian thespian, and director, known for his works in Telugu theatre. He was honored by the Government of India, in 2013, by bestowing on him the Padma Shri, the fourth highest civilian award, for his contributions to the field of art.

== Early life ==
Rekander Nageswar Rao, born in a theatre-owning family, in the remote village of Gimidi Peta in Srikakulam district, in Andhra Pradesh, in India, is a fourth generation theatre owner. His forefathers, viz. Rekander Chiina Venkatrao, who founded the Sri Venkateswara Natya Mandali (Surabhi) in 1937, Rekandar Dasaradhi Rao and Rekandar Bhoja Raju were well known theatre personalities. He took charge of running the theatre group in 1973.

== Notable works ==
Some of his notable plays are Lavakusa, Mayabazar, Anasuya, Sri Veera Brahmam gari Charitra, Harishnandra, Bobbili Yuddham, Balanagamma, Chintamani, and Rangoon rowdy. He has also assisted B. V. Karanth, renowned Kannada director, in a play by the name of Chandi Priya.

== Awards and recognitions ==
Rekander Nageshwar Rao is a recipient of the Sangeet Natak Akademi Award, which he received in 2011. Later, the Government of India honoured him with the civilian award of Padma Shri, in 2013.
