= Mubarak Al-Zwair =

Kuwaiti politician (1927–2022)

Member of the National Assembly of Kuwait
- In office 1985–1986

Personal details
- Born: 1927 Kuwait City, Kuwait
- Died: 4 June 2022 (aged 94–95)
- Party: Independent

Mubarak Al-Zwair (Arabic: مبارك الزوير; 1927 – 4 June 2022) was a Kuwaiti politician. An independent, he served in the National Assembly from 1985 to 1986.
