= Death of Shaimaa Gamal =

Egyptian TV presenter

Shaima Gamal
- Born: January 30, 1980
- Died: 2022 (aged 41–42)
- Known for: Egyptian TV presenter

Shaima Gamal (January 30, 1980 – c. June 20, 2022) was an Egyptian TV presenter known for hosting the show "Al-Mushaghiba" on LTC, an Egyptian television channel. In 2017, she gained media attention for a controversial on-air incident.

== Murder ==
Shaima Gamal was brutally murdered by her husband, Judge Ayman Haggag, in June 2022. According to official investigations, her husband lured her to a farm in the Badrashein area of Giza Governorate, where he physically assaulted her, then shot her and concealed her body with the help of his accomplice, who acted as a mediator in the crime.

After killing her, they buried the body in a hole inside the farm and poured chemicals over it in an attempt to erase any evidence. Her disappearance lasted for several days before his accomplice reported the crime, leading to the discovery of the body and the launch of an extensive investigation that ultimately resulted in their conviction.

After several months of trial, the court sentenced Ayman Haggag and his accomplice to death, as evidence proved their involvement in premeditated murder. In March 2025, the Court of Cassation upheld the verdict, making it final and enforceable. The case sparked widespread public outrage in Egypt, shedding light on domestic violence and crimes committed against women in society.
