= Celestino Pérez =

Puerto Rican swimmer (1948–2022)

Personal information
- Born: 24 February 1948
- Died: 22 June 2022 (aged 74)

Sport
- Sport: Swimming
Medal record
Representing Puerto Rico
Central American and Caribbean Games
| Gold medal – first place | 1966 San Juan | 4x100m freestyle relay |

Celestino Pérez (24 February 1948 – 22 June 2022) was a Puerto Rican former swimmer who competed in the 1964 Summer Olympics.
