= Alain Dupas =

French astronomer and astrophysicist (1945–2022)

- Born: 11 October 1945; Paris, France
- Died: 12 June 2022 (aged 76); Meudon, France
- Education: Paris-Sud University
- Occupations: Astronomer; Astrophysicist

Alain Dupas (11 October 1945 – 12 June 2022) was a French astronomer and astrophysicist.

== Biography ==
Dupas earned a doctorate from Paris-Sud University in 1997 and became a specialist in aerospace policies, technologies and programs. He directed studies at CNES in the field of research on star systems for more than 20 years. He was an associate researcher at the George Washington University Space Policy Institute and was an aerospace advisor to the European Bank for Reconstruction and Development. In 2005, he co-founded the Astronaute Club Européen alongside Jean-Pierre Haigneré and Laurent Gathier.

Alain Dupas died in Meudon on 12 June 2022 at the age of 76.

== Publications ==
- Les vaisseaux cosmiques (1968)
- La lutte pour l'espace (1977)
- Ariane et la navette spatiale (1981)
- Aux sources de l'énergie (1984)
- L'homme et l'espace (1984)
- La saga de l'espace (1986)
- Modernissimots : le dictionnaire du temps présent (1987)
- L'âge des satellites (1997)
- Une autre histoire de l'espace (1999)
- Destination Mars (2002)
- La nouvelle conquête spatiale (2010)
- Demain, nous vivrons tous dans l'espace (2011)
- L'appel du cosmos (2011)
