= Polycarpose Zacharias =

Indian Jacobite Syrian Orthodox prelate (1970–2022)

His Grace Mor Polycarpose Zacharias Metropolitan of Malabar Diocese
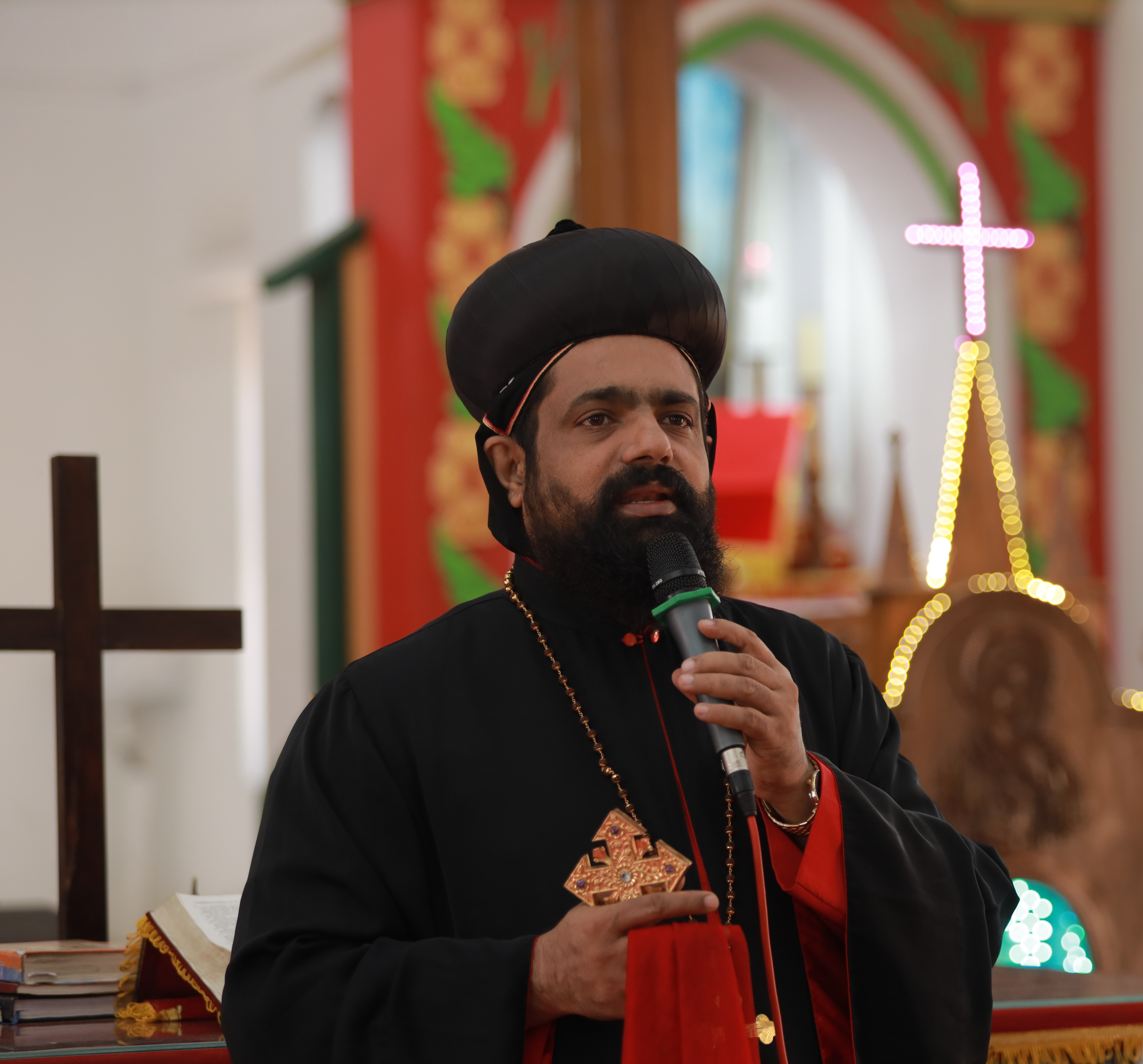
- Church: Jacobite Syrian Orthodox Church
- Diocese: Malabar Diocese
- See: Holy Apostolic See of Antioch & All East
- Predecessor: Zacharias Mor Philoxenos

Orders
- Consecration: 2 January 2012 by Baselios Thomas I
- Rank: Metropolitan

Personal details
- Born: Scaria Kochillom; 23 July 1970
- Died: 21 June 2022 (aged 51) Manarcad, Kerala, India
- Denomination: Syriac Orthodox Church

Kochillathu Zacharias Mar Polycarpos (23 July 1970 – 21 June 2022) was the Metropolitan of Malankara Syriac Orthodox Church. He served on the advisory boards of various educational institutions including St Mary's College Meenangadi, St Peter's & St Paul's English Medium School and Aramaia International Residential School.

Zacharias left the world from heart attack in a hospital at Manarcaud on 21 June 2022 at the age of 51.
