= Marc Pessin =

French engraver, editor, and illustrator (1933–2022)

- Born: 27 May 1933; Paris, France
- Died: 4 June 2022 (aged 89)
- Occupations: Engraver; Editor; Illustrator

Marc Pessin (27 May 1933 – 4 June 2022) was a French engraver, editor, and illustrator.

== Biography ==
Pessin's mother, Berthe, introduced him to graphic arts at a young age. Interested in engraving early on, he trained in the workshops of several Parisian engravers. In 1965, he left Paris to settle in Saint-Laurent-du-Pont, where he created his publishing house Le verbe et l'empreinte. During this time, he collaborated with President of Senegal and poet Léopold Sédar Senghor, who introduced him to Éditions du Seuil founder Paul Flamand. Senghor's poem, New York, was published in 1967 and contained gold-plated stainless steel engravings by Pessin. He then collaborated with numerous other poets and created engravings in their poems.

Pessin considered himself to be the creator of an imaginary archeology, creating fictitious tracings of an extinct civilization on manuscripts, coins, bones, and so on, which he collected at the Centre d'archéologie pessinoise. In 1995, a 26-minute documentary on this theme was broadcast on Canal+, titled Les Pessinois sont parmi nous.

From 1965 to 2018, Pessin participated in 61 exhibitions, including 15 outside of France. He had six exhibitions in Paris, including three at the Bibliothèque nationale de France.

Marc Pessin died on 4 June 2022 at the age of 89.

== Techniques ==
Pessin typically used intaglio and lasers to create his engravings, but had mastered all forms of the art, such as stencils and milling cutters. The poet Alain Bosquet described him as a "poet on paper".

== Distinctions ==
- Guest of honor at the Salon du livre de Paris (1981)
- "Most beautiful book of the year", awarded by the Comité français du livre illustré (1982)
- Grande médaille d'or de la ville de Grenoble (2011)
