= Jorge Zuloaga =

Colombian comedian (1922–2022)

- Born: 1 May 1922; Bogotá, Colombia
- Died: 1 June 2022 (aged 100); Bogotá, Colombia
- Other name: El Topolino
- Citizenship: Colombia
- Occupations: Comedian; actor; journalist; screenwriter
- Spouse: Teresa García (m. 1959)
- Children: 4

Jorge Zuloaga (1 May 1922 – 1 June 2022), known artistically as El Topolino, was a Colombian comedian, actor, journalist and screenwriter, most recognized for his participation in the comedy show Sábados Felices between 1976 and 1998.

== Life and career ==
Zuloaga was born in Bogotá on 1 May 1922. He began his career as a journalist by joining the newspaper El Espectador in 1952 in the judicial section. In the 1960s and 1970s, he worked on the radio as a reporter and screenwriter in media such as La voz de Bogotá, Todelar and Horizonte.

In the mid-1970s, Zuloaga was invited by presenter Alfonso Lizarazo to participate as a contestant on his program Sábados Felices. Given the good reception that his presentation had, Zuloaga was added to the main cast of the show, remaining until the end of the 1990s. As an actor, he participated in film and television productions such as The Woman from the Hot Land, The Millionaire Taxi Driver, One Hundred Years of Infidelity, The Strategy of the Snail, and Pablo Escobar, The Drug Lord.

== Personal life and death ==
Zuloaga married Teresa García in 1959, with whom he had four children. After his retirement from the media, he dedicated himself to writing books about his career and joined the Association of Former Caracol Workers. In 2015, he won a lawsuit against Caracol Televisión for irregularities in his contract when he was a member of the cast of Sábados Felices.

Zuloga turned 100 in 2022, and died in Bogotá on 1 June.
