= Bernhard Casper =

German philosopher (1931–2022)

- Born: 24 April 1931; Trier, Rhine Province, Prussia, Germany
- Died: 8 June 2022 (aged 91); Wittnau, Baden-Württemberg, Germany
- Education: University of Freiburg; University of Augsburg
- Occupation: Philosopher

Bernhard Casper (24 April 1931 – 8 June 2022) was a German philosopher.

== Biography ==
Born in Trier in 1931, Casper passed his Abitur in Aschaffenburg in 1949. From 1979 to 2000, he taught Christian philosophy at the University of Freiburg. He was a Roman Catholic priest in the Diocese of Würzburg and lived in Wittnau, Baden-Württemberg. In 1995, he earned an honorary doctorate from the Institut Catholique de Paris. In 2012, he was named a citizen of honor of Travagliato.

Bernhard Casper died in Wittnau on 8 June 2022 at the age of 91.

== Publications ==
- Das Dialogische Denken. Franz Rosenzweig, Ferdinand Ebner und Martin Buber (1967)
- Feuerbach, Marx, Freud (1974)
- Phänomenologie des Idols (1981)
- Gott nennen. Phänomenologische Zugänge (1981)
- Alltag und Transzendenz. Studien zur religiösen Erfahrung in der gegenwärtigen Gesellschaft (1992)
- Das Ereignis des Betens. Grundlinien einer Hermeneutik des religiösen Geschehens (1998)
- Angesichts des Anderen. Emmanuel Levinas – Elemente seines Denkens (2009)
- Grundfragen des Humanen. Studien zur Menschlichkeit des Menschen (2014)
- „Geisel für den Anderen – vielleicht nur ein harter Name für Liebe“. Emmanuel Levinas und seine Hermeneutik diachronen da-seins (2020)
- Die Rose der Barmherzigkeit - Ein Hauptwerk des Freiburger Münsters (2021)
