= Louis Crocq =

French military doctor and psychiatrist (1928–2022)

- Born: 14 January 1928; Asnières-sur-Seine, France
- Died: 8 June 2022 (aged 94); France
- Occupations: Military doctor Psychiatrist

Louis Crocq (14 January 1928 – 8 June 2022) was a French military doctor, and psychiatrist who specialized in shell shock.

== Biography ==
Crocq studied medicine and earned a doctorate in psychology in 1961. He became a military psychiatrist in 1952 and became certified in psychiatry in 1974. In 1987, he retired from the French Armed Forces and began consultations at the Hôpital Saint-Antoine and later the Necker–Enfants Malades Hospital. He was president of the military and disaster section of the World Psychiatric Association and founded the Association de langue française pour l’étude du stress et du trauma.

After the Attentat Saint-Michel, he co-founded the Cellule d'urgence médico-psychologique alongside Gérard Lopez and Patrice Louville. His publications focused on shell shock and post-traumatic stress disorder.

Louis Crocq died on 8 June 2022 at the age of 94.

== Bibliography ==
- Les surdités de la pratique militaire. Surdités par blast-injury, surdités par traumatisme sonore, surdités psychogéniques (1953)
- Psychiatrie en pratique médicale courante (1972)
- Informatique et psychiatrie (1976)
- Les traumatismes psychiques de guerre (1999)
- Gérer les grandes crises (2009)
- 16 leçons sur le trauma (2012)
- Les blessés psychiques de la Grande Guerre (2014)

== Honors and awards ==
Commander of the Order of Legion of Honour (2006)
