= Ravi Paranjape =

Indian painter (1935–2022)

Ravi Krishnaji Paranjape
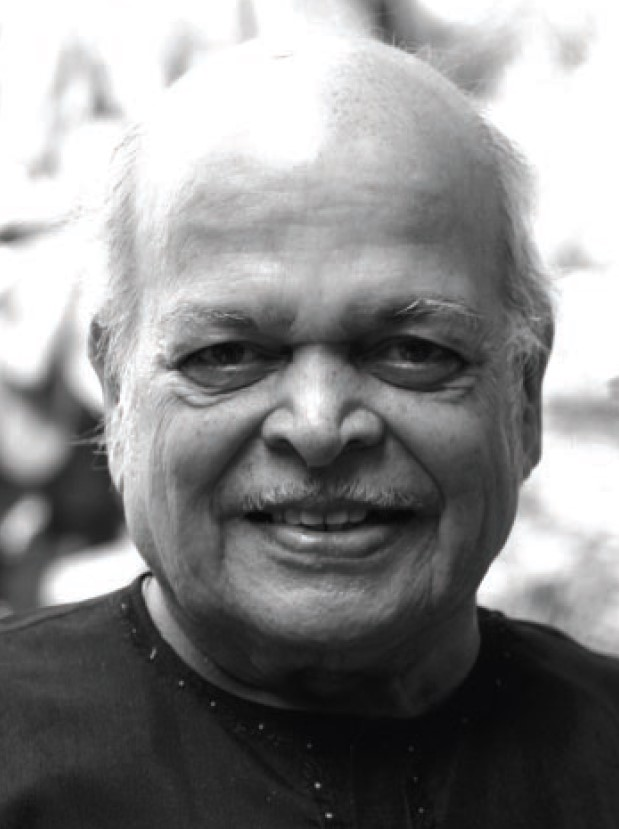
- Born: 9 October 1935; Belgaum, Bombay Presidency, British India
- Died: 11 June 2022 (aged 86); Pune, Maharashtra, India
- Known for: His artwork and books
- Awards: Award for the best published advertisement for 1978. Hall of Fame Award in the field of applied arts. Award for his autobiography ‘Brush Mileage’. Veteran Artist Award. The Pune Pride Award. Godavari Gaurav Award

Ravi Krishnaji Paranjape (9 October 1935 – 11 June 2022) was an Indian painter, illustrator and author based in Pune. He worked in the fields of advertising, architecture and publishing before becoming an independent artist, painter and author.

== Career ==
Ravi Paranjape was born on 9 October 1935 in Belgaum, Karnaka. Soon after completing his education and apprenticeships, he started a career as an illustrator. He worked for several companies including well-known publication houses and studios in Mumbai.

== Death ==
Ravi Paranjape died in a private hospital in Pune at the age of 86.

== Awards ==
Ravi Paranjape has received several awards for his artistic and literary accomplishments including the following:

- 1978 - Communication Arts Guild (CAG) Award for the best published advertisement for 1978
- 1995 - ICAG Hall of Fame Award in the field of applied arts.
- 1996 - Dayawati Modi Foundation's and ‘Bhairuratan Damani Award’ for his autobiography ‘Brush Mileage’
- 2002 - The Government of Maharashtra's Veteran Artist Award
- 2003 - The Pune Pride Award
- 2006 - Godavari Gaurav Award, presented by Kusumagraj Pratishthan
- 2022 - ROOPDHAR Lifetime Achievement Award, The Bombay Art Society

== Books ==
Ravi Paranjape is the author of several books including the following:

- Portfolio - Outdoor
- The World of My Illustrations
- Sketching & Drawing
- Diwali
- Master Artist
- Shikhare Ranga Reshanchi (e-book)
