= Josh Jensen (winemaker) =

American winemaker (1944–2022)

Jonathan Eddy Jensen (February 11, 1944 – June 18, 2022) was an American winemaker. He was known mostly for producing Californian pinot noir.
