= John Parkes (cricketer) =

English cricketer and British Army officer (1938–2022)

Personal information
- Full name: John Leonard Parkes
- Born: 23 June 1938; Leamington Spa, Warwickshire, England
- Died: 15 June 2022 (aged 83)
- Batting: Left-handed
- Bowling: Leg break

Career statistics
Competition	First-class
Matches	1
Runs scored	0
Batting average	0.00
100s/50s	–/–
Top score	0
Balls bowled	78
Wickets	1
Bowling average	61.00
5 wickets in innings	–
10 wickets in match	–
Best bowling	1/61
Catches/stumpings	–/–
- Source: ESPNricinfo, 17 February 2019

John Leonard Parkes OBE (23 June 1938 – 15 June 2022) was an English first-class cricketer and British Army officer. Parkes served in the Gurkha Rifles in a military career that spanned 26 years, during which he played cricket for the Free Foresters. He continued to play cricket regularly for the Army in the Far East in Singapore and Hong Kong after joining his Regiment up to the time he became its Commanding Officer

== Life, cricket and military career ==
Parkes was born at Leamington Spa. A promising young leg break bowler, he was talent-spotted in his teens by Warwickshire County Cricket Club. Parkes attended the Royal Military Academy Sandhurst, where he played for two seasons in the Sandhurst cricket 1st XI where he took a record number of wickets. In his second year he was team captain of the Sandhust XI that toured BAOR annually, winning every match for the first time. At commissioning he was awarded the Sword of Honour, after which he became a second lieutenant in December 1959, upon which he was posted to the 2nd King Edward VII's Own Gurkha Rifles. He played first-class cricket for the Free Foresters in 1960, when he played against Oxford University at Oxford. He was dismissed twice during the match without scoring by Alan Smith, as well as taking the wicket of the Nawab of Pataudi in Oxford University's first-innings after he had made 113 runs.

Parkes was promoted to the rank of lieutenant in June 1961, with promotion to the rank of captain in December 1965. He was mentioned in dispatches in May 1967 for actions during anti-communist operations in Malaysia. He was promoted to the rank of major in December 1970, with promotion to the rank of lieutenant colonel in June 1976. He attended the Staff College, Camberley and the United States Armed Forces Staff College at Norfolk, Virginia. He became a colonel in June 1981 and was made an Officer of the Order of the British Empire in the 1982 New Year Honours. His Staff Appointments included those of MA to VCGS and Assistant Director of Defence Policy on the Central Staff at MoD before becoming Chief of Staff at the Royal Military College of Science, Shrivenham. Parkes retired from active service in April 1985, retaining the rank of colonel. After taking early retirement, he ran his family's farming enterprise which included a pedigree herd of Welsh Black cattle, a flock of pedigree Dorset Horn sheep, an arable division and a stud, breeding Thoroughbred racehorses and half-bred hunters. His political ambitions saw him selected for the Conservative Party`s Parliamentary Candidates List and he also became constituency Chairman at Somerton and Frome.

Parkes had a lifelong interest in hunting in all its forms and was Master/Huntsman and advisor on breeding beagles, bassets, harriers and foxhounds. He judged hounds at the Peterborough Festival of Hunting as well as at numerous Hunt Puppy Shows.

Parkes died on 15 June 2022, at the age of 83.
