= Christ in Glory with Saints and Odoardo Farnese =

Painting by Annibale Carracci

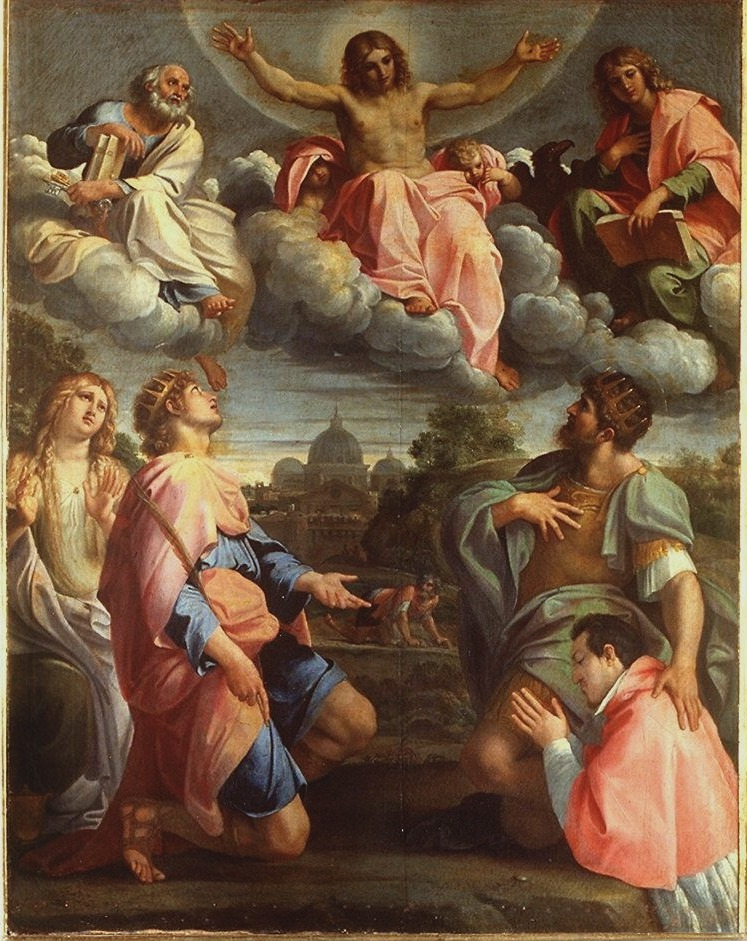
Christ in Glory with Saints and Odoardo Farnese (1598–1600) by Annibale Carracci

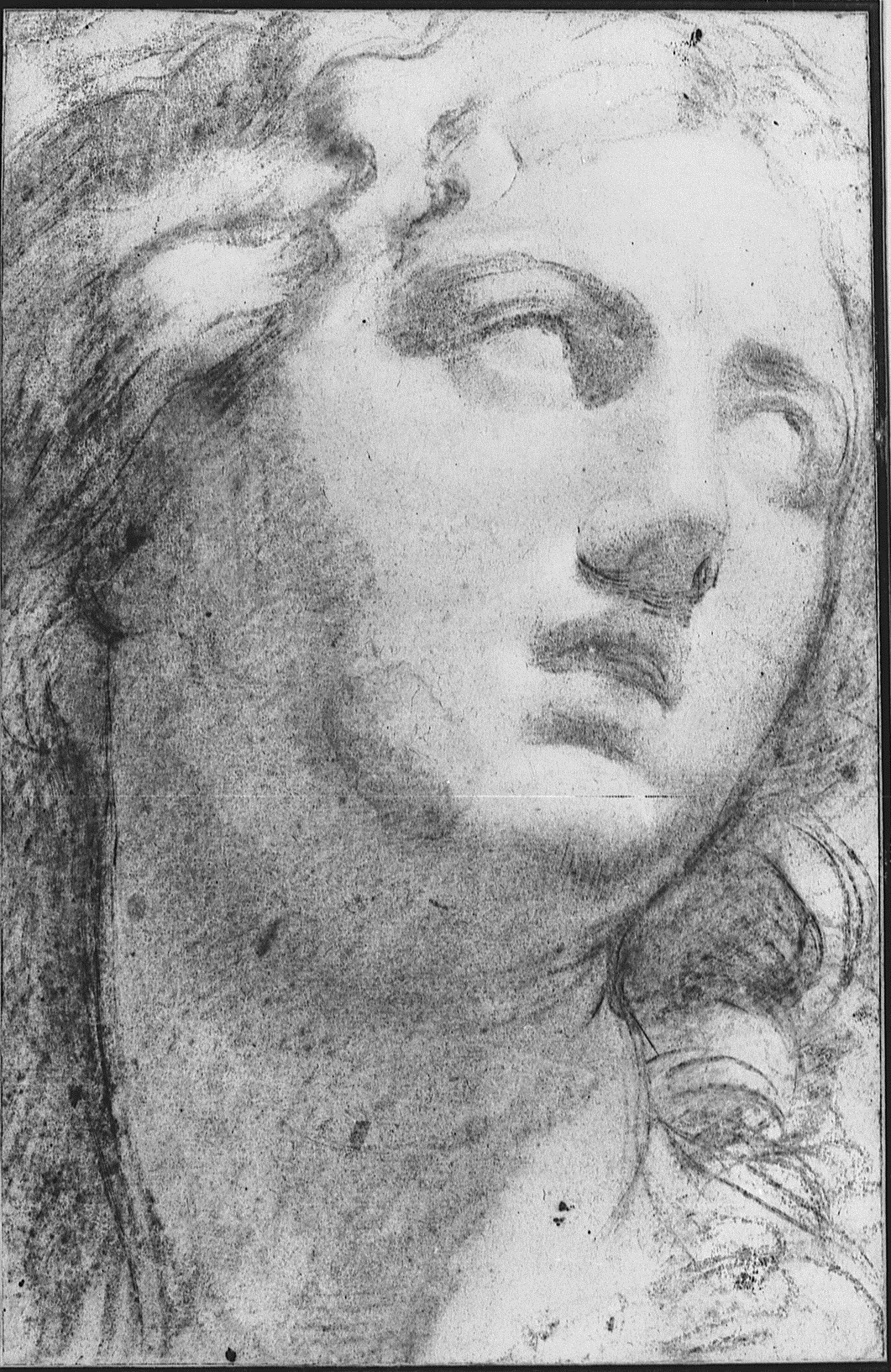
Annibale Carracci, Niobe, 1595–1598, Royal Collection, Windsor Castle

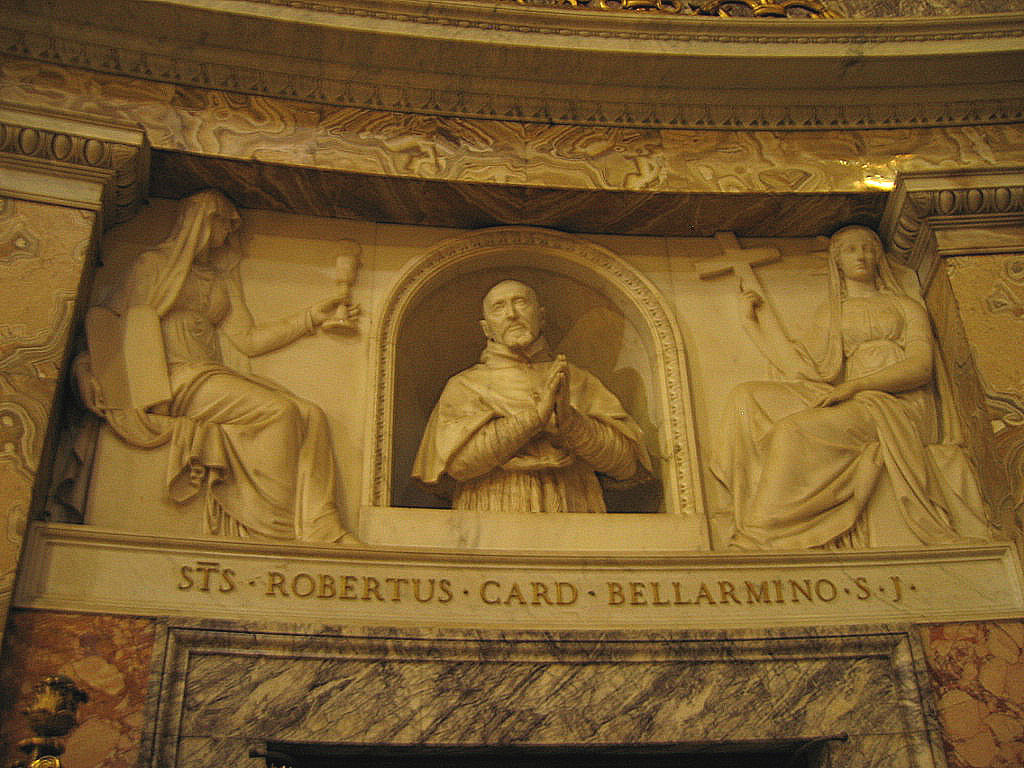
Gian Lorenzo Bernini, Bust of cardinal Roberto Bellarmino, 1621–1624, Chiesa del Gesù, Rome

Christ in Glory with Saints and Odoardo Farnese or 'Christ in Glory with Odoardo Farnese and Saints Peter, John the Evangelist, Mary Magdalene, Hermenegild and Edward is a painting by the Italian Baroque painter Annibale Carracci. Placed in the Eremo di Camldoli either early in its life or straight after its creation, at the end of the 17th century Ferdinando II de' Medici moved it to the Galleria Palatina in Florence, where it still hangs.

== History ==
It was produced in Rome for Odoardo Farnese, with a notable preparatory drawing for the upper part of the painting is now in the Palais des Beaux-Arts, Lille. In the background Annibale places a view of the St Peter's Basilica, then still incomplete and without the dome of the Cappella Clementina, probably as a prophecy of England's return to Catholicism. Odoardo's praying pose is argued to be an influence on that Bernini's sculpture of cardinal Roberto Bellarmino.

=== Dating ===
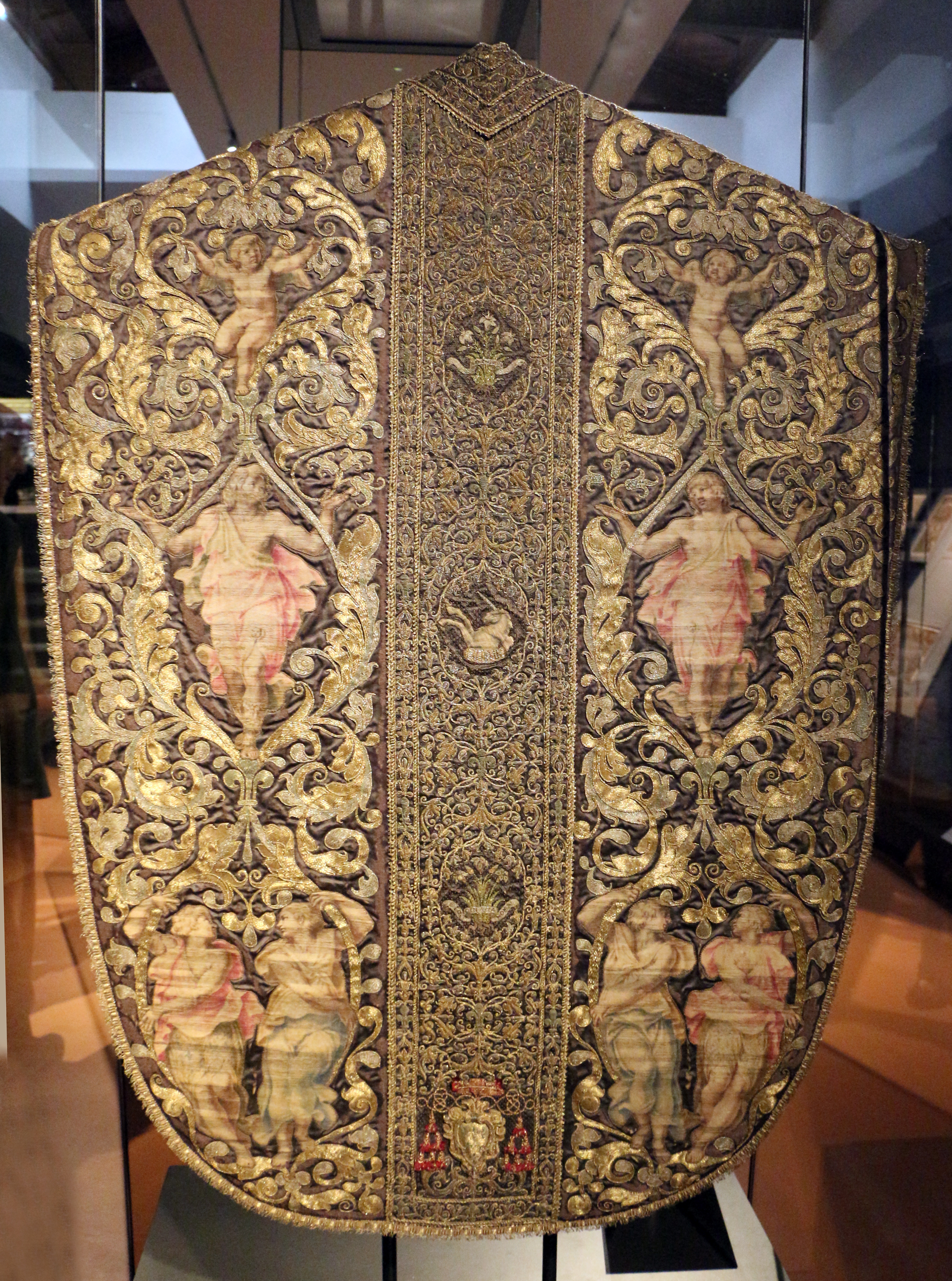
Reverse of the chasuble, Museo dell'Opera del Duomo, Florence

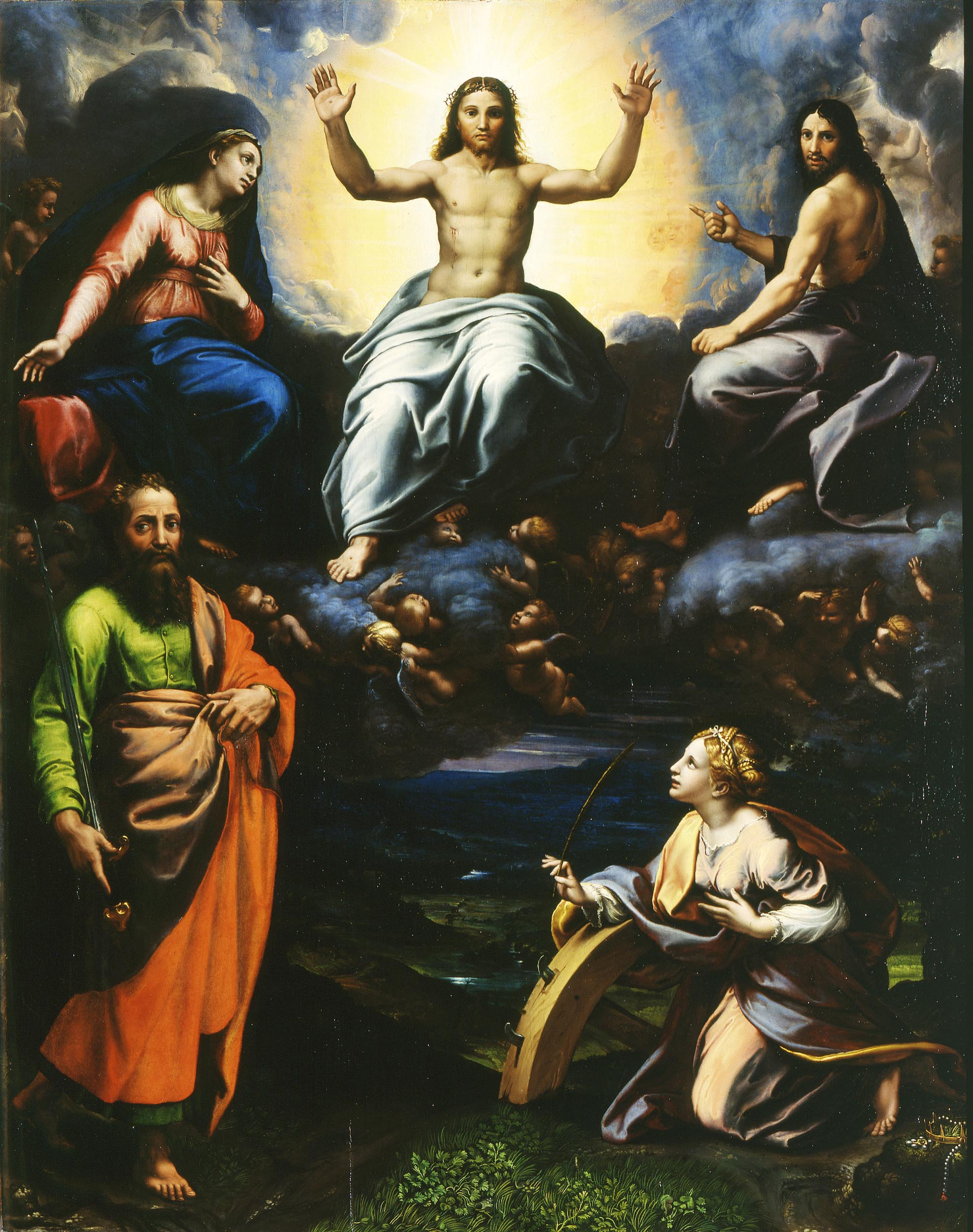
Giulio Romano, Deesis with Saint Paul and Saint Catherine, ca. 1520, Galleria nazionale, Parma

Its dating is the object of much critical dispute, depending on various interpretations of its significance.

Some argue it was an expression of Odoardo's campaign to be granted the throne of England, then in the balance as Elizabeth I approached her death without a named successor. This was based on his descent from the House of Lancaster via his mother Maria d'Aviz of Portugal – it is Odoardo's namesake the English king Edward the Confessor who is shown presenting him to Christ. In the centre background is a figure on all fours, probably referring to a passage in Edward the Confessor's hagiography in which he healed a cripple and thus became the patron saint of cripples.

Odoardo's father Alexander Farnese was nephew to Philip II of Spain, who had a particular devotion to another royal saint, Hermenegild, shown in the bottom register opposite Edward. His presence alludes to the House of Farnese's family links to the House of Habsburg, further legitimising Odoardo's dynastic claims via Philip, who had been married to Elizabeth's half-sister Mary I. Supporters of this theory argue that the work must pre-date the final demise of Odoardo's campaign in the early 1600s and that – combined with its style – this places it between 1597 and 1598.

Another theory holds that the work was produced to celebrate Odoardo's appointment as "cardinal protector" of the kingdom of England in February 1600, which would place it in or just after that year.

=== Destination ===
The painting's original destination is also heavily debated. It was definitely at Odoardo's chapel at the Eremo di Camaldoli at some point, but it is unclear whether this had always been the work's intended destination or whether it was only placed there later.

For those arguing that the work relates to Odoardo's royal ambitions, the work was sent to Camaldoli some time after its completion, probably after his hopes of becoming King of England had been dashed, making it embarrassing to still have the painting on display in Rome and preferable to hide it away off the beaten track. Those backing the cardinal protector theory, however, argue from the presence of Mary Magdalene to the left of Ermenegild that it was commissioned expressly for the Farnese chapel at the Eremo - she was that chapel's patron saint.

The work's creation seems to be linked to the making of a chasuble and altar frontal (both now in the Museo dell'Opera del Duomo in Florence, but originally in the Eremo di Camaldoli. Both the chasuble and frontal include the Farnese symbols of lilies and unicorns and were previously misattributed to Francesco Salviati or Perin del Vaga, artists who had worked for the family decades earlier. Annibale not only produced the drawings for the two works but also painted them onto the fabric, rather than the more usual route of giving his drawings to embroiderers. Stylistic similarities to the painting and their inclusion of Edward and Ermenegild confirm Annibale's authorship and argue for them and the painting being part of a single unified commission for the Eremo.

=== Influences ===
The composition of the upper part of the painting with Christ between saint Peter and saint John is based on Giulio Romano's Deesis with Saint Paul and Saint Catherine (Galleria nazionale di Parma), which itself derived from a drawing by Raphael. Long misattributed to Raphael himself, Romano's painting would have been seen in Parma by Annibale.

The work is also strongly influenced by Correggio, which is argued to support the 1597-1598 dating, since at that time that influence had not yet been eclipsed by Roman artists in Annibale's work. However, some art historians argue that he did not totally abandon influences from Correggio and northern Italy in general after that date and so the work can still be dated slightly later. Mary Magdalene's face may be based on that of a classical statue of Niobe from the famous Niobids group owned by the Medici in Rome, where Annibale probably saw them, before they were moved to the Uffizi – a drawing of that statue in his hand survives and features in several of his other paintings.
