= Fermo Guisoni =

Italian painter

Fermo Guisoni (died after 1566) was an Italian painter of the Renaissance period, active mainly in his native city of Mantua.

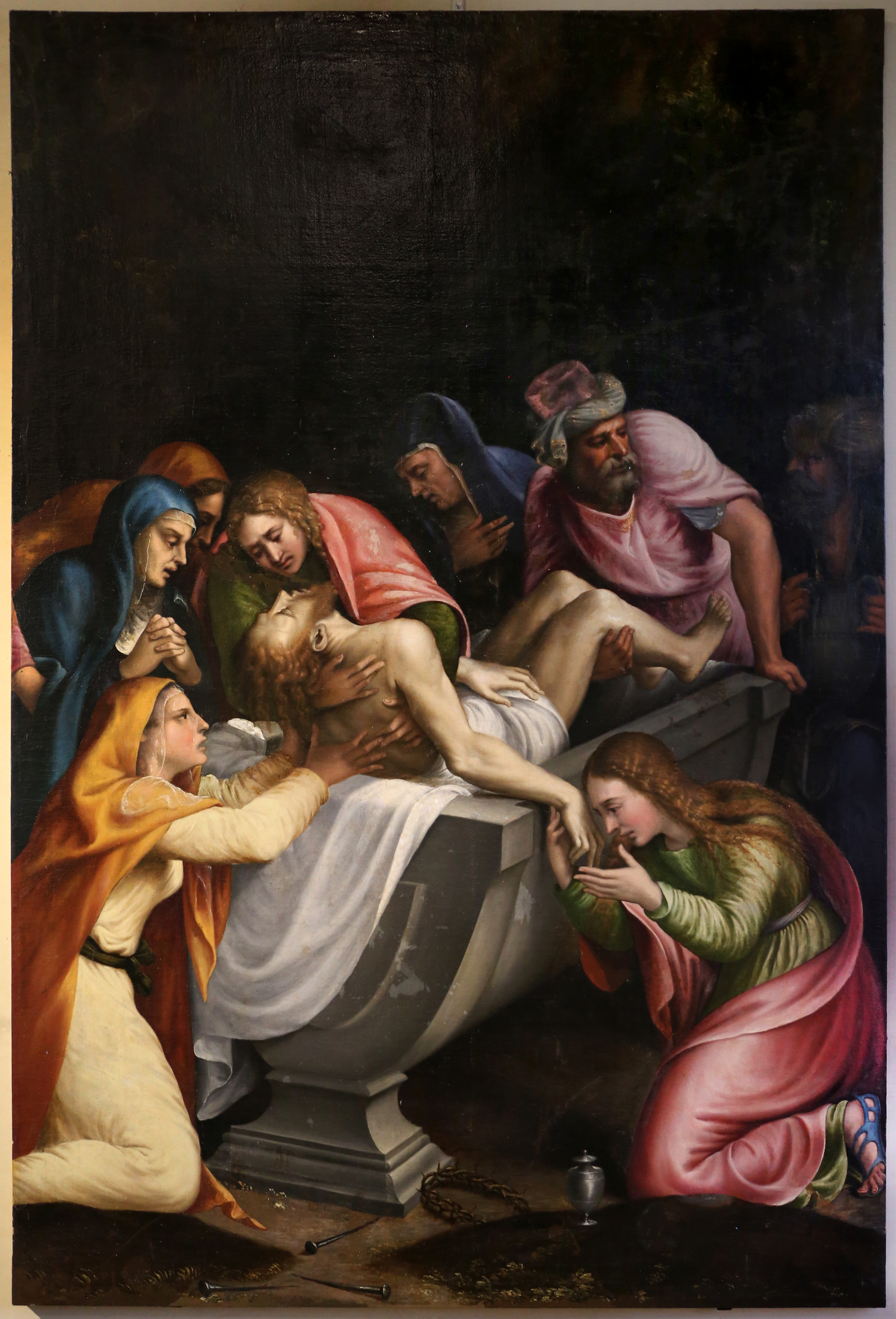
"Deposition" in the palazzo Ducale, Mantua

He was one of the main assistants in the studio of painter Giulio Romano. He painted the cupola of the cathedral of Mantua. He painted an admired Crucifixion with Peter and Andrew. He also frescoed a cartoon of Romano's depicting Peter and Paul as fisherman. According to Vasari, the other pupils of Giulio Romano were Gian dal Lione, Raffaello da Colle Borghese, Benedetto Pagni da Pescia, Figurino da Faenza, Rinaldo Mantovano and Giovanni Battista Bertani (Mantovani).
