= Deesis with Saint Paul and Saint Catherine =

Painting by Giulio Romano

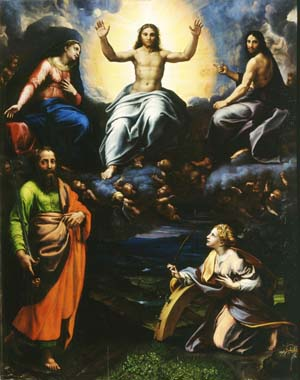
Deesis with Saint Paul and Saint Catherine (c. 1520) by Giulio Romano

Deesis with Saint Paul and Saint Catherine is an oil on panel painting by Giulio Romano, executed c. 1520, now in the Galleria nazionale di Parma. Its title refers to deesis, a subject in Christian iconography, shown here with Paul of Tarsus and Catherine of Alexandria in the lower register and the Virgin Mary and John the Baptist in the upper.

It shows the artist still in his Raphaelesque classicising phase, far from the Mannerism he later showed at the Palazzo Te in Mantua - for example, his figure of St Catherine explicitly refers to the figures of Raphael's Vatican fresco Disputation of the Holy Sacrament. Until the late 19th century Deesis was even misattributed to Raphael, though this was corrected via preparatory drawings for the work (Louvre).

Sources state the work was on the high altar of the monastery church of San Paolo in Parma since at least the mid 17th century and possibly earlier, though it is unknown how the work first came to the city. It may have been commissioned around 1520, possibly by abbess Giovanna da Piacenza, who also commissioned frescoes for her private Camera della Badessa from Correggio. This is supported by the work's chosen saints - the church was dedicated to Paul and the monks had a strong devotion to Catherine.
