= Rinaldo Mantovano =

Italian painter

Rinaldo Mantovano, also called Domenico Rinaldo, was an Italian painter from Mantua who was active between 1527 and 1539. According to Giorgio Vasari he was the most talented assistant of Giulio Romano during his stay in the service of the Gonzaga Marquis' of Mantua.

== Biography ==
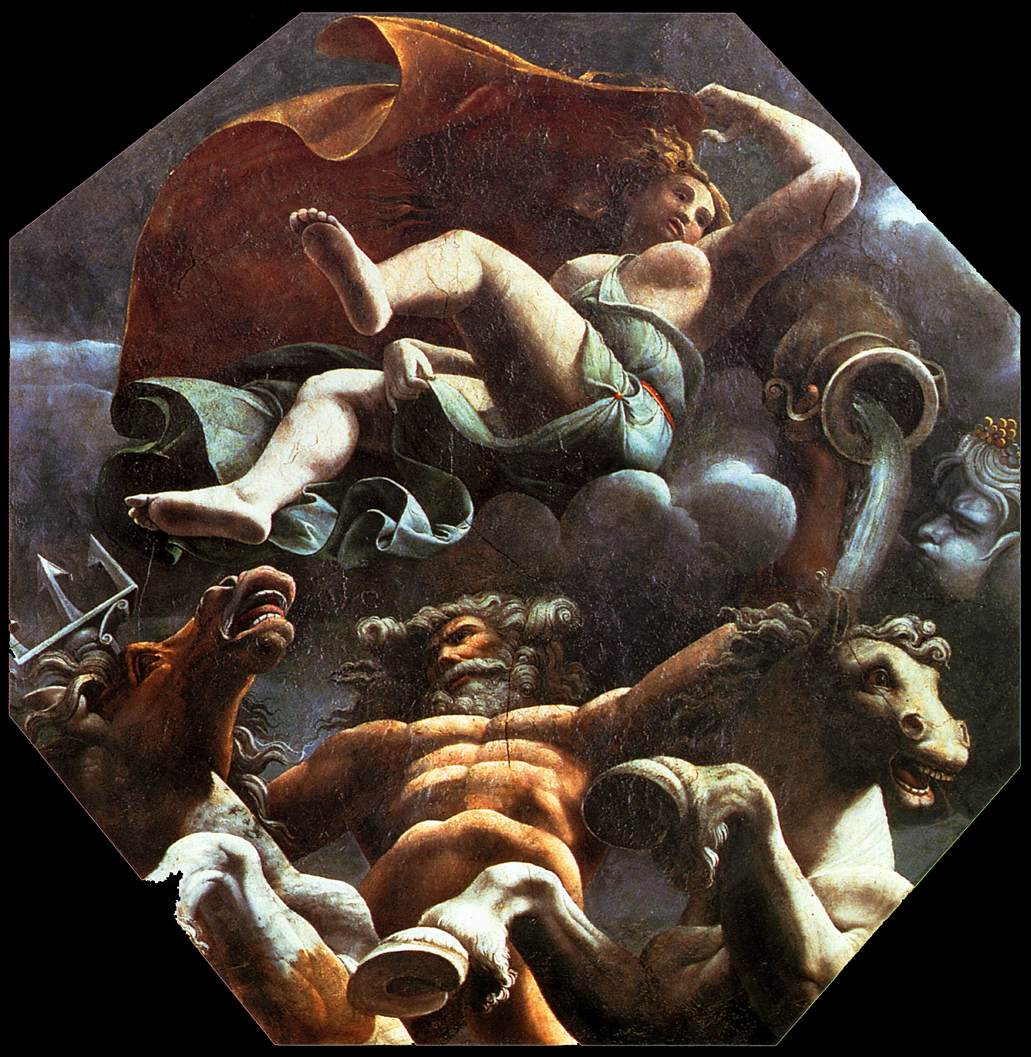
Céfiro y Psyché, Sala de Psiche, Palazzo del Te, Mantua

Rinaldo's birth and death dates are unknown. We know that he was born in Mantua, and he was among those charged with decorating the Palazzo del Te in Mantua. In this work he assisted with the Sala dei Venti, the Camera delle Aquile (1527) and the Loggia di David (1531). During part of 1531 he is documented as collaborating with Giulio Romano in decoration of the Castello di San Giorgio of Mantua. From 1532 to 1536 he participated in executing the frescoes in the Sala dei Giganti, where we see his somewhat flat and decorative style of painting on a large part of the ceilings and walls.

From 1536 to 1539 he was part of the group of artists who decorated the Ducal Palace of Mantua. There he worked on the Appartamento di Troia and Camerino dei Falconi. Working alone, but following his master designs, he painted the frescoes in the Boschetti chapel of San Andrea de Mantua. In this work there is again a tendency to flatten and compress the figures, eliminating any sense of spatial perspective. He is also attributed, though with doubts, to the decoration of the Chapel of St. Sebastian in the same church in Mantua.

His works show great promise, but his career was cut short by a premature death. A Triumph of Julius Cesar by him was found in Vienna, and pictures in the National Gallery, The Capture of Carthage and Continence of Scipio, and the Rape of the Sabine Women, with the subsequent Reconciliation between the Romans and Sabines, have been ascribed Rinaldo instead of Romano.
