= Palazzo del Te =

Palace in Mantua, Italy completed in 1534

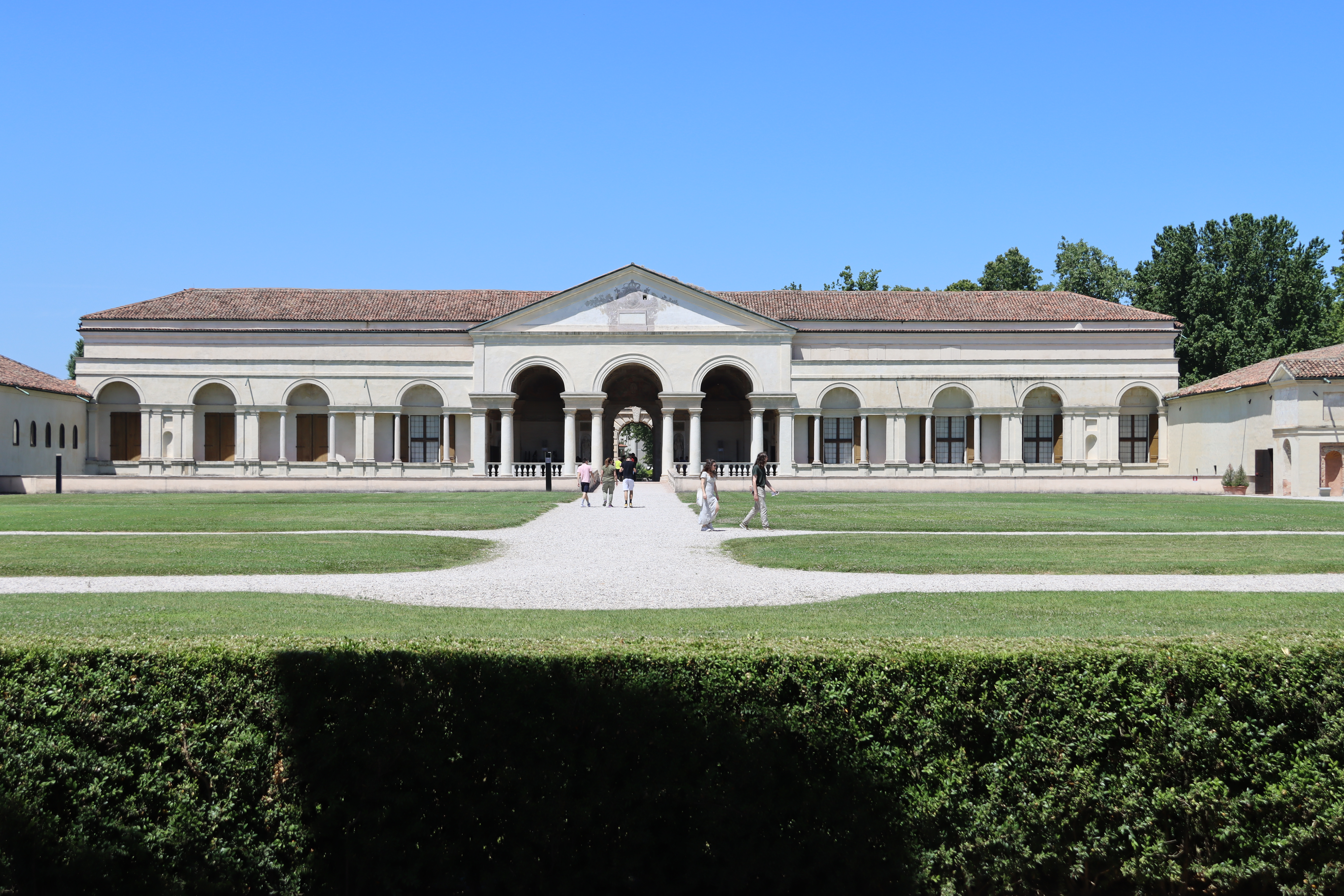
- Main façade of Palazzo Te, Mantua.
- Alternative names: Palazzo Te

General information
- Architectural style: Mannerist
- Location: Mantua, Italy
- Coordinates: 45.14737°N 10.78728°E
- Construction started: 1524
- Completed: 1534
- Client: Federico II Gonzaga

Design and construction
- Architect: Giulio Romano

Website
- www.centropalazzote.it

Palazzo del Te (Italian pronunciation: [paˈlattso del ˈte]), or simply Palazzo Te, is a palace in the suburbs of Mantua, Italy. It is an example of the mannerist style of architecture, and the acknowledged masterpiece of Giulio Romano.

== Name ==
The palace is mostly referred to by English-speaking writers, especially art historians, as Palazzo del Te. In Italian, the name is now commonly shortened to Palazzo Te.

It was originally named after Il Te, the suburb where it was built. The toponym is most likely derived from Lombard tejee or tejé, referring to a "linden grove" that once grew in the area, or alternatively from Latin attegia "hut". Art historian Giorgio Vasari spelled the name Palazzo del T, based on the now archaic Italian-language name of the letter T.

== History ==
Palazzo del Te was constructed 1524–34 for Federico II Gonzaga, Marquess of Mantua, as a palace of leisure. The site chosen was that of the family stables which he had built at Isola del Te, on the edge of the marshes just outside Mantua's city walls, as early as in 1502.

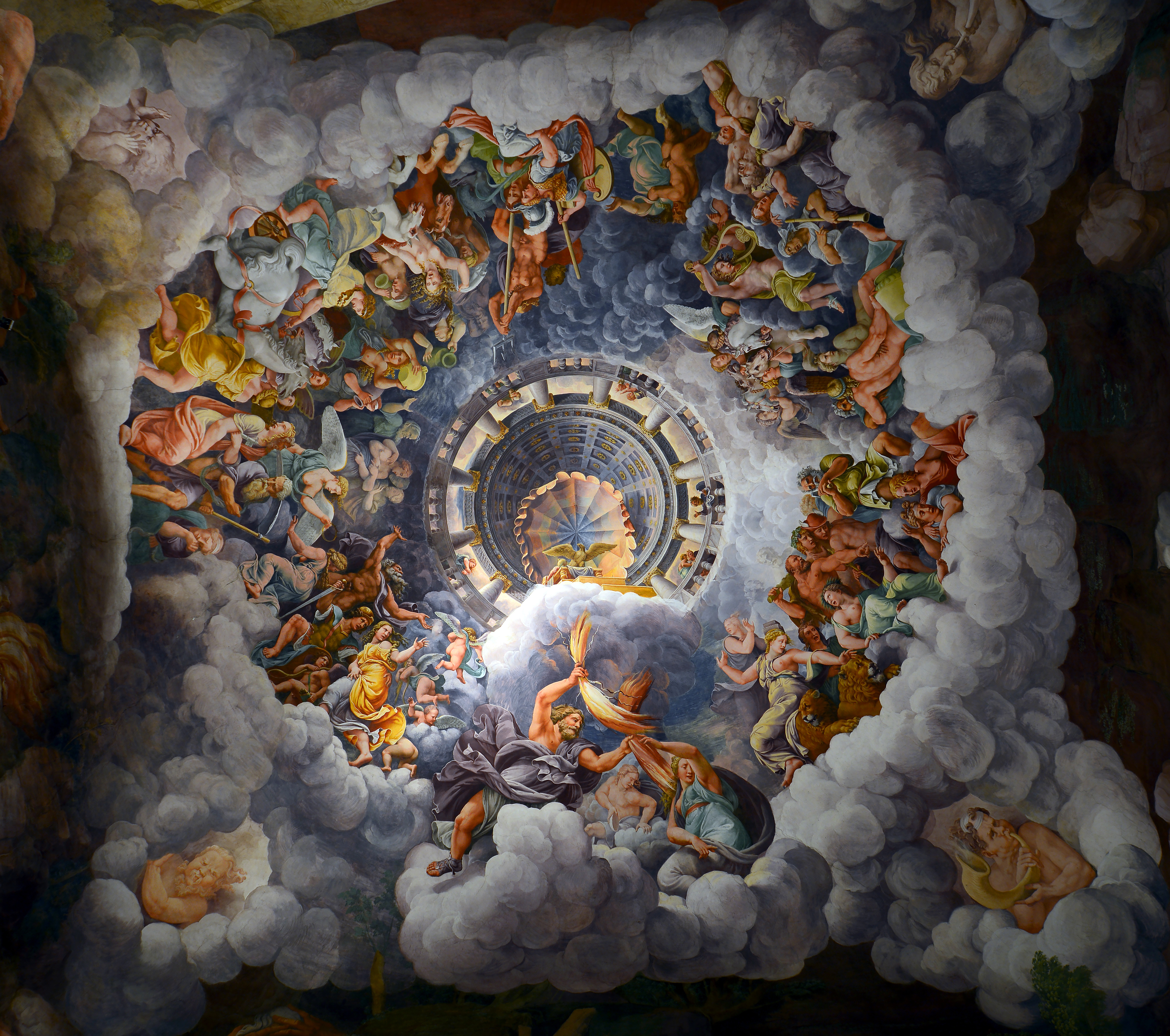
Mannerism's most famous fresco: Giulio Romano's illusionism invents a dome overhead and dissolves the room's architecture in the Fall of the Giants.

Giulio Romano, a pupil of Raphael, was commissioned to design the building. The shell of the palazzo, erected within eighteen months, is basically a square house containing a cloistered courtyard. A formal garden complemented the house, enclosed by colonnaded outbuildings ending in a semicircular colonnade known as the Exedra or Esedra.

Once the shell of the building was completed, for ten years a team of plasterers, carvers, and fresco painters laboured until barely a surface in any of the loggias or salons remained undecorated. Under Romano's direction, local decorative painters such as Benedetto Pagni and Rinaldo Mantovano worked extensively on the frescos.

In July 1630, during the War of the Mantuan Succession (1628–31), Mantua and the palace were sacked over three days by an Imperial army of 36,000 Landsknecht mercenaries. The remaining populace fell victim to one of the worst plagues in history that the invaders had brought with them. The Palazzo was looted from top to bottom and remained an empty shell with nymphs, gods, goddesses, and giants adorning the walls of the empty, echoing rooms.

== Description ==
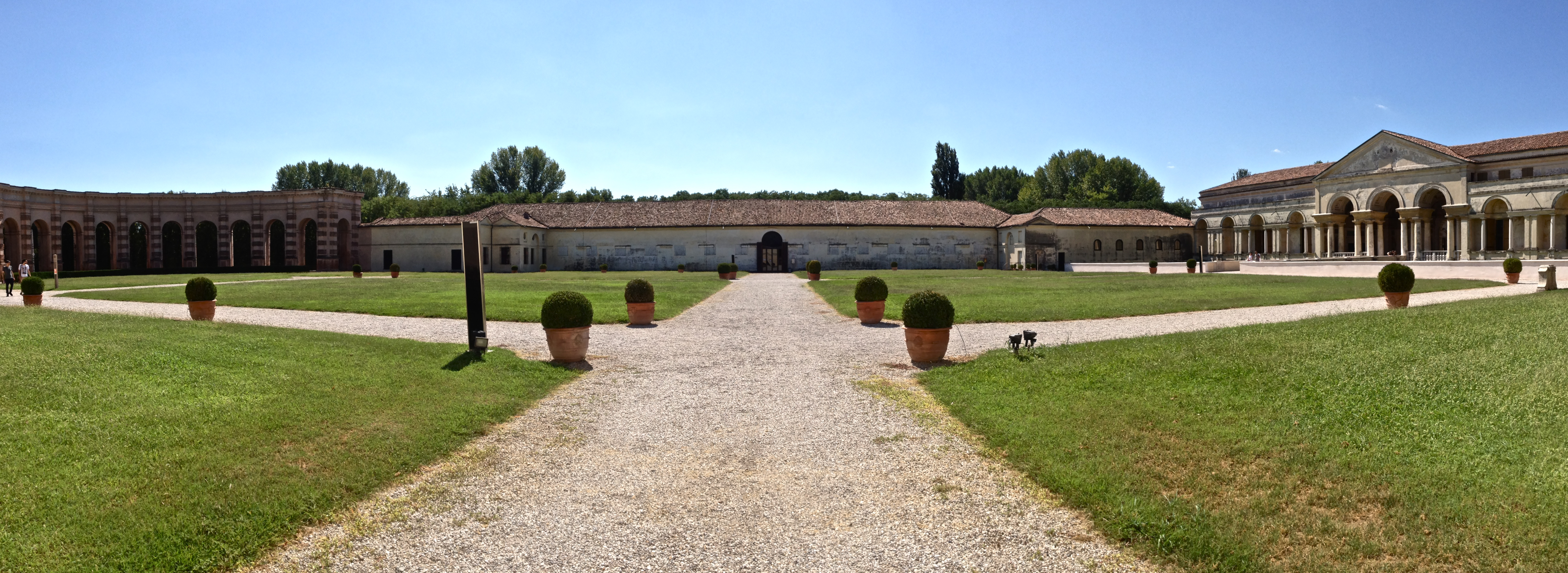
Panoramic view of the Giardino dell'Esedra, Palazzo Te

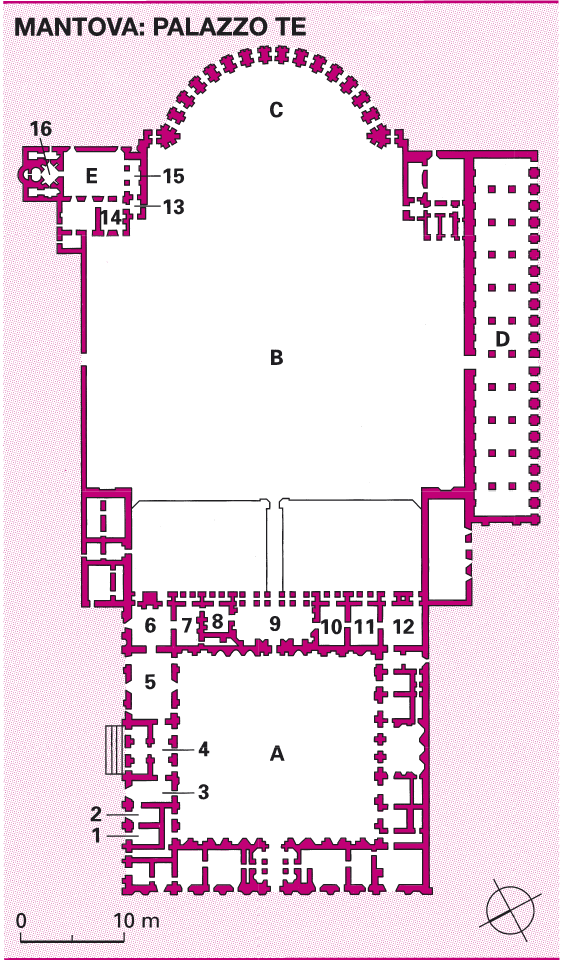
Plan of Palazzo Te, Mantua. Scale 0:10 m. (A) Courtyard of Honour, (B) Garden, (C) Exedra, (D) Orchard, (E) Secret Garden; (1) Room of Ovid, (2) Room of the Emblems, (3) Room of the Sun, (4) Loggia of the Muses, (59 Hall of the Horses, (6) Room of Psyche, (7) Room of the Winds, (8) Room of the Eagles, (9) Loggia of David, (10) Room of the Stucco, (11) Room of Caesar, (12) Room of the Giants, (13) Vestibule, (14) Room of Attilio Regolo, (15) Loggia, (16) Grotto. In Guida Rossa Lombardia Touring Club Italiano

Like the Villa Farnesina in Rome, the suburban location allowed for a mixing of both palace and villa architecture. The four exterior façades have flat pilasters against rusticated walls, the fenestration indicating that the piano nobile is the ground floor, with a secondary floor above. The East façade differs from the other three by having Palladian motifs on its pilaster and an open loggia at its centre rather than an arch to the courtyard. The facades are not so symmetrical as they appear and the spans between the columns are irregular. The centers of the North and South facades are pierced by two-storey arches without portico or pediment, simply a covered way leading to the interior courtyard.

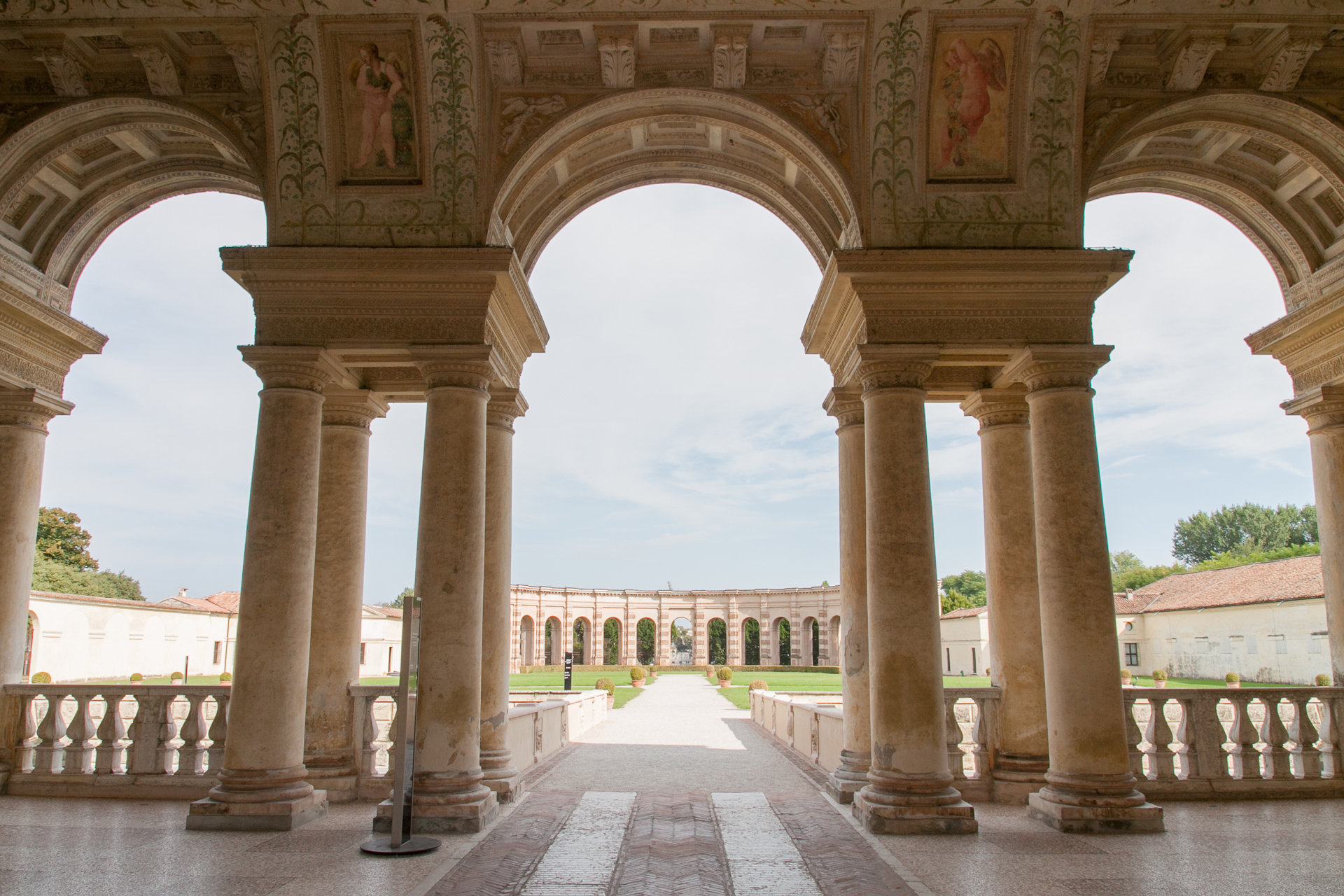
Archway to the semicircular colonnade

Few windows overlook the inner courtyard ("cortile"); the colonnaded walls are decorated on all sides by deep niches and blind windows, and the intervening surfaces are spattered by spezzato (broken and blemished plaster) giving life and depth to the surfaces.

The frescoes are a feature of the Palazzo. The subjects range from Olympian banquets in the Sala di Psiche ("Hall of Psyche") and stylised horses in the Sala dei Cavalli ("Hall of the Horses") to giants and grotesques around the walls of the Sala dei Giganti ("Hall of the Giants"). These rooms, once used by the ducal court of the Gonzaga family, were viewed by the Emperor Charles V, who, when visiting in 1530, elevated his host Federico II of Gonzaga from Marquess to Duke of Mantua.

One of the most evocative parts of the lost era of the palazzo is the Casino della Grotta ("Lodge of the Grotto"), a small suite of intimate rooms arranged around a grotto and loggetta (covered balcony) where courtiers once bathed in the small cascade that splashed over the pebbles and shells encrusted in the floor and walls.

Part of the Palazzo today houses the Museo Civico del Palazzo Te (Civic Museum of Palazzo del Te), endowed by the publisher Arnoldo Mondadori. It contains a collection of Mesopotamian art.

== Gallery ==
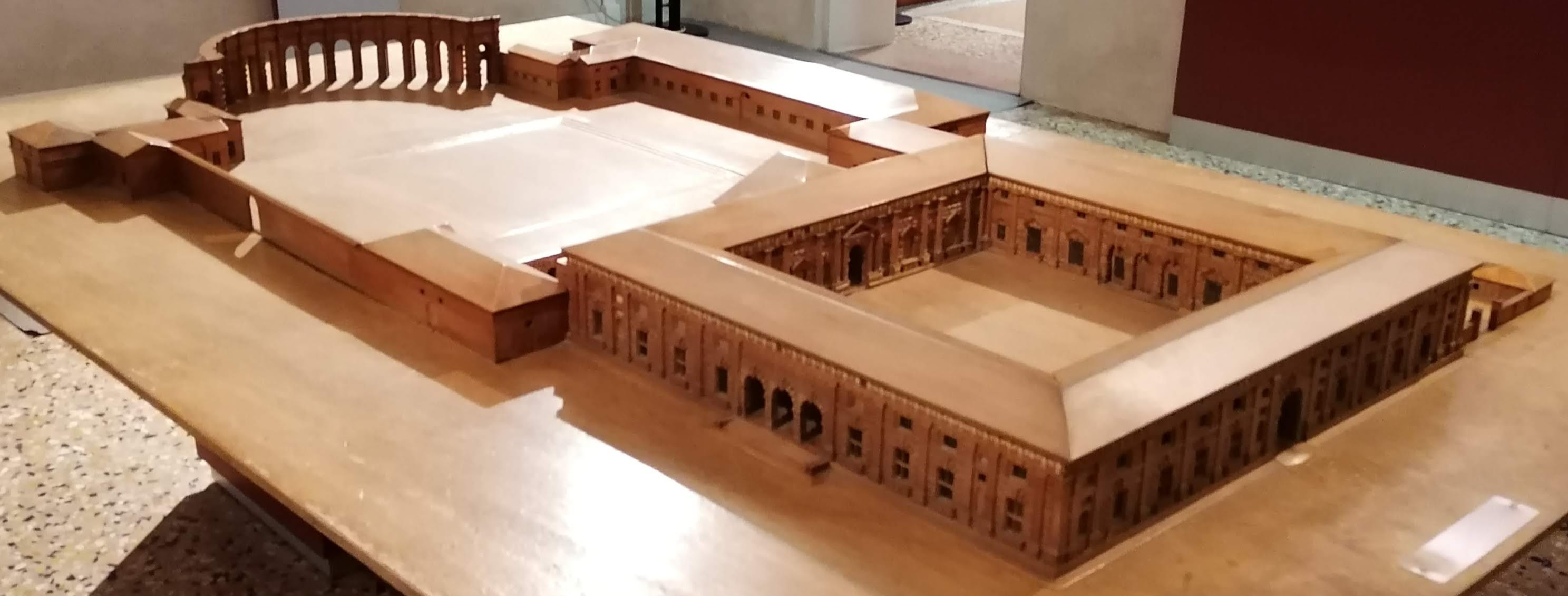
Model

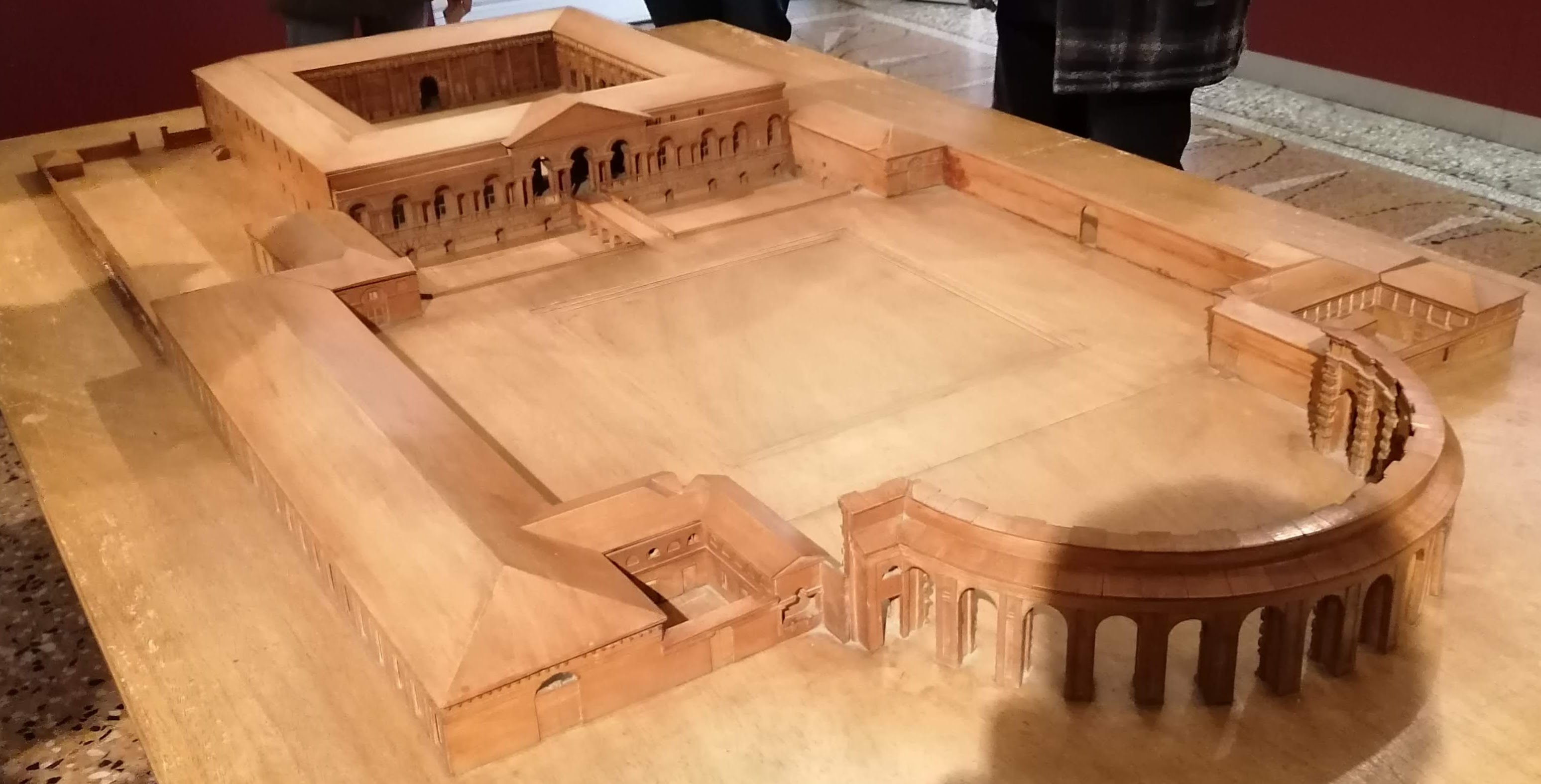
Model

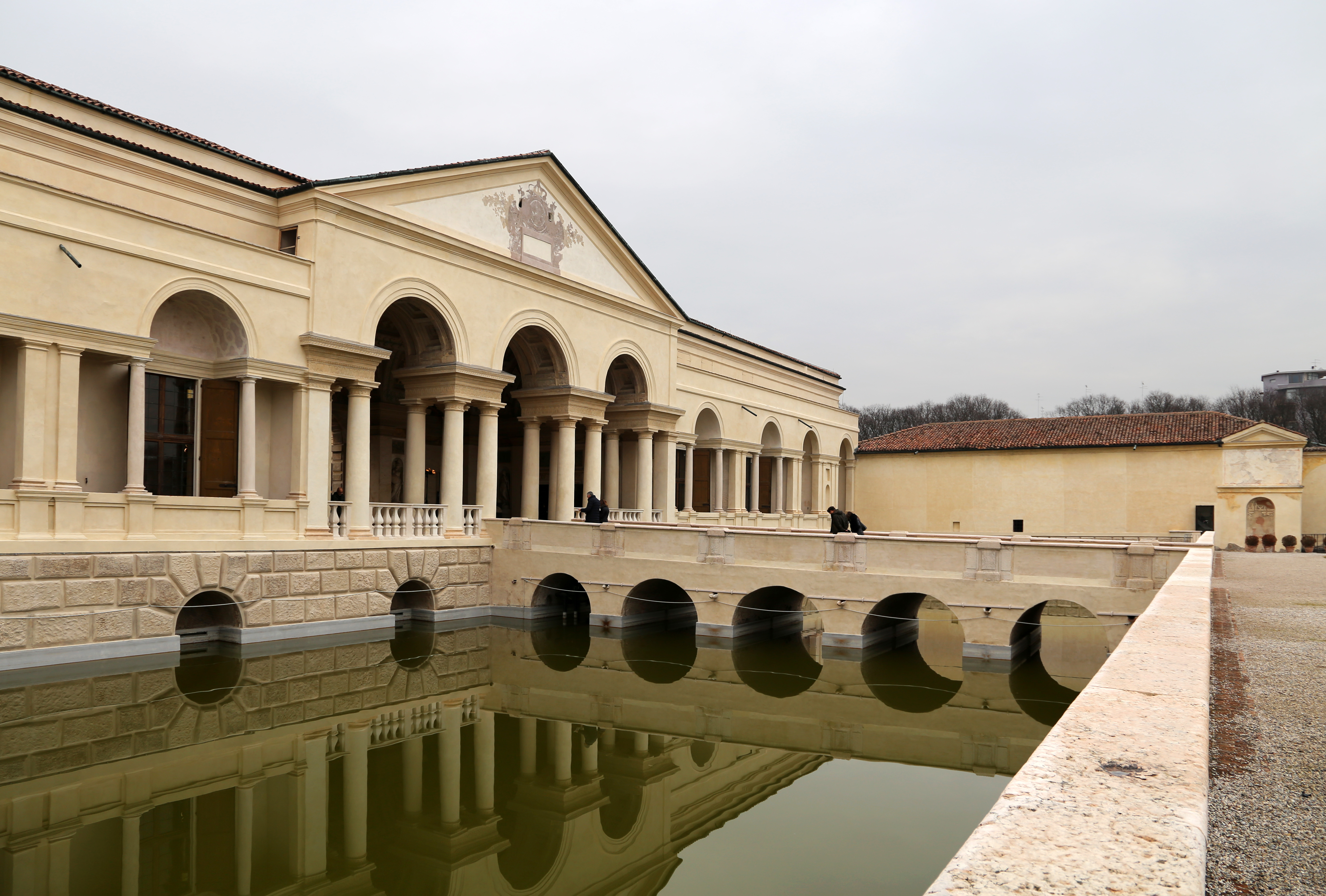
Loggia

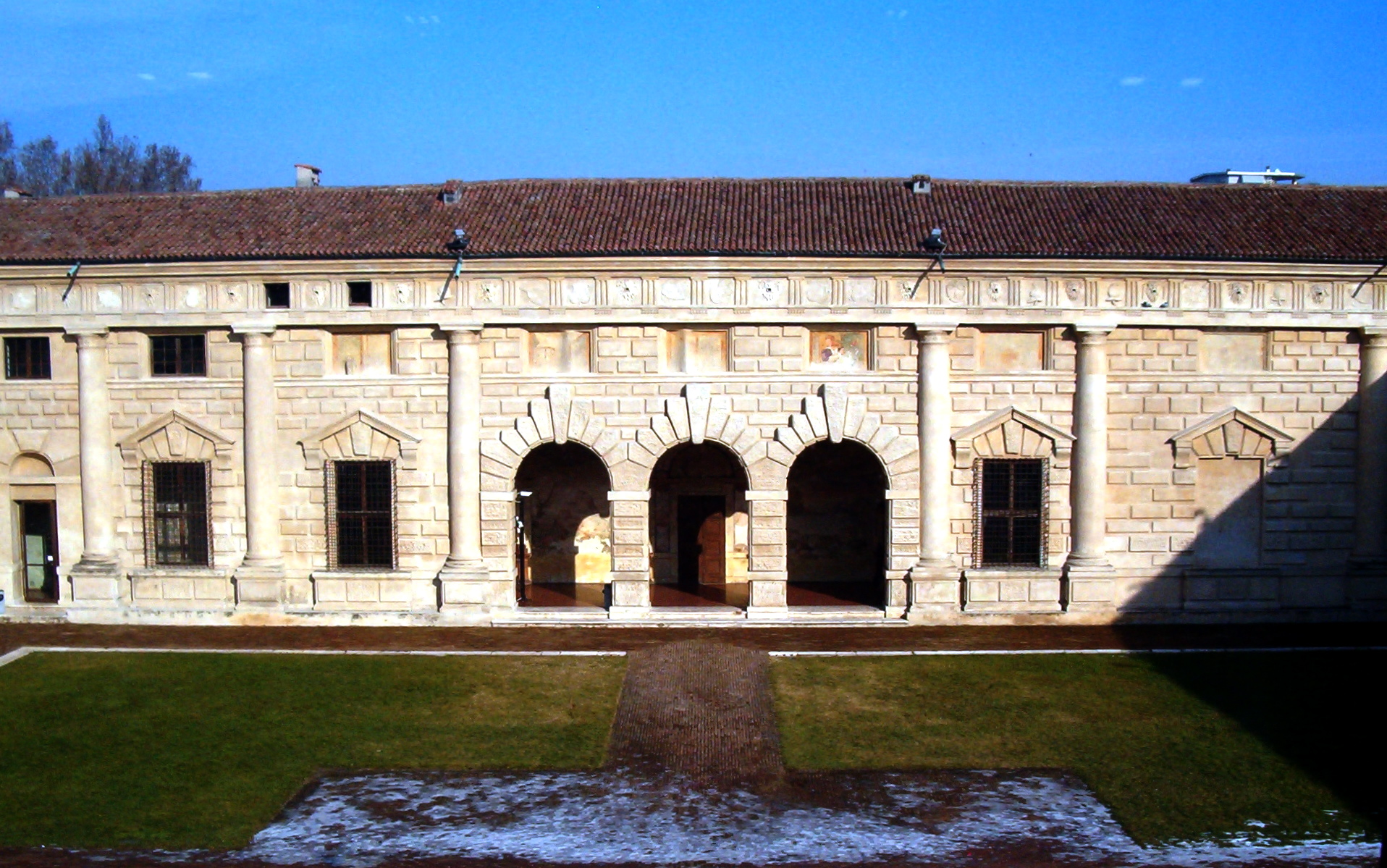
Internal façade

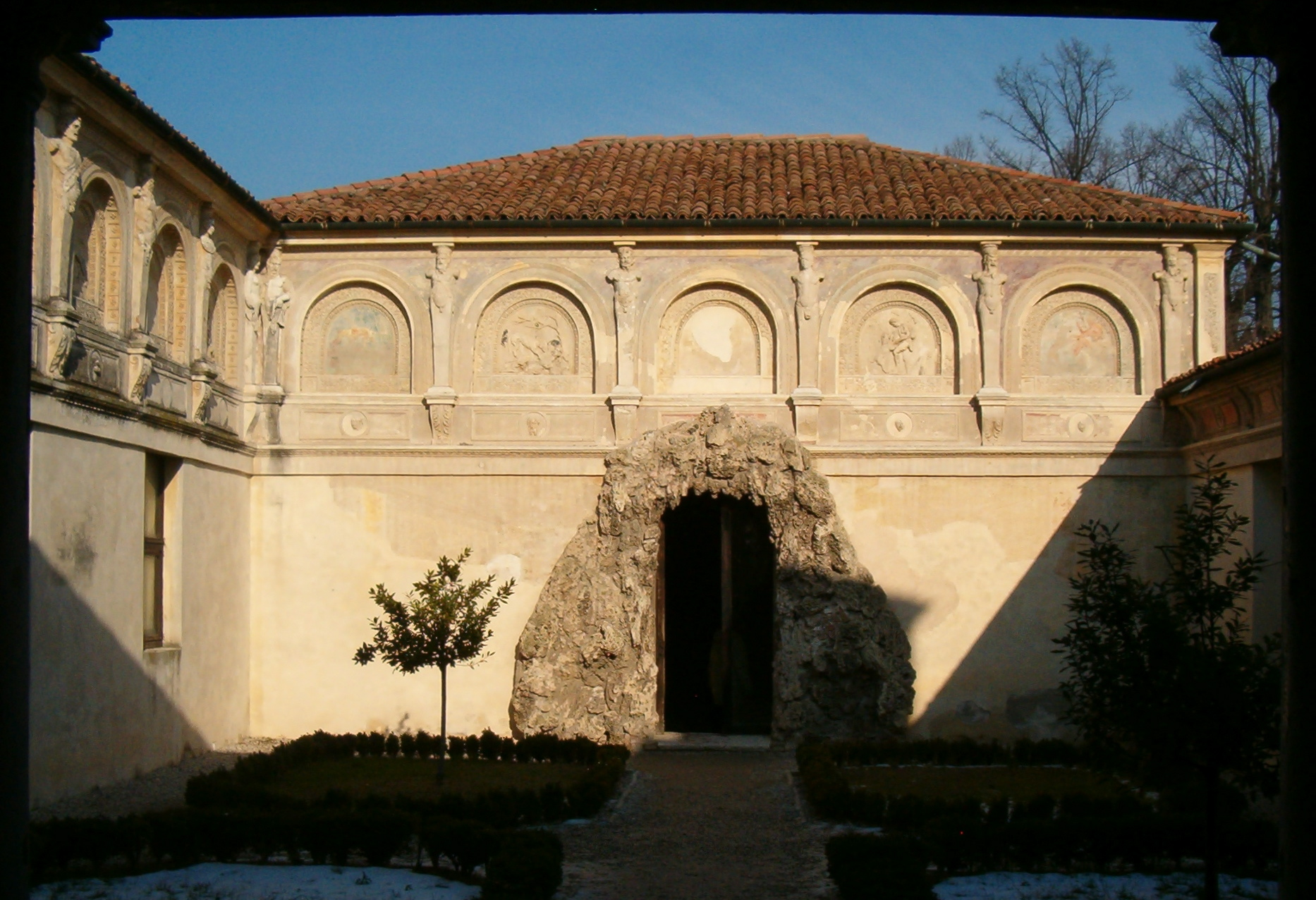
Casino della Grotta

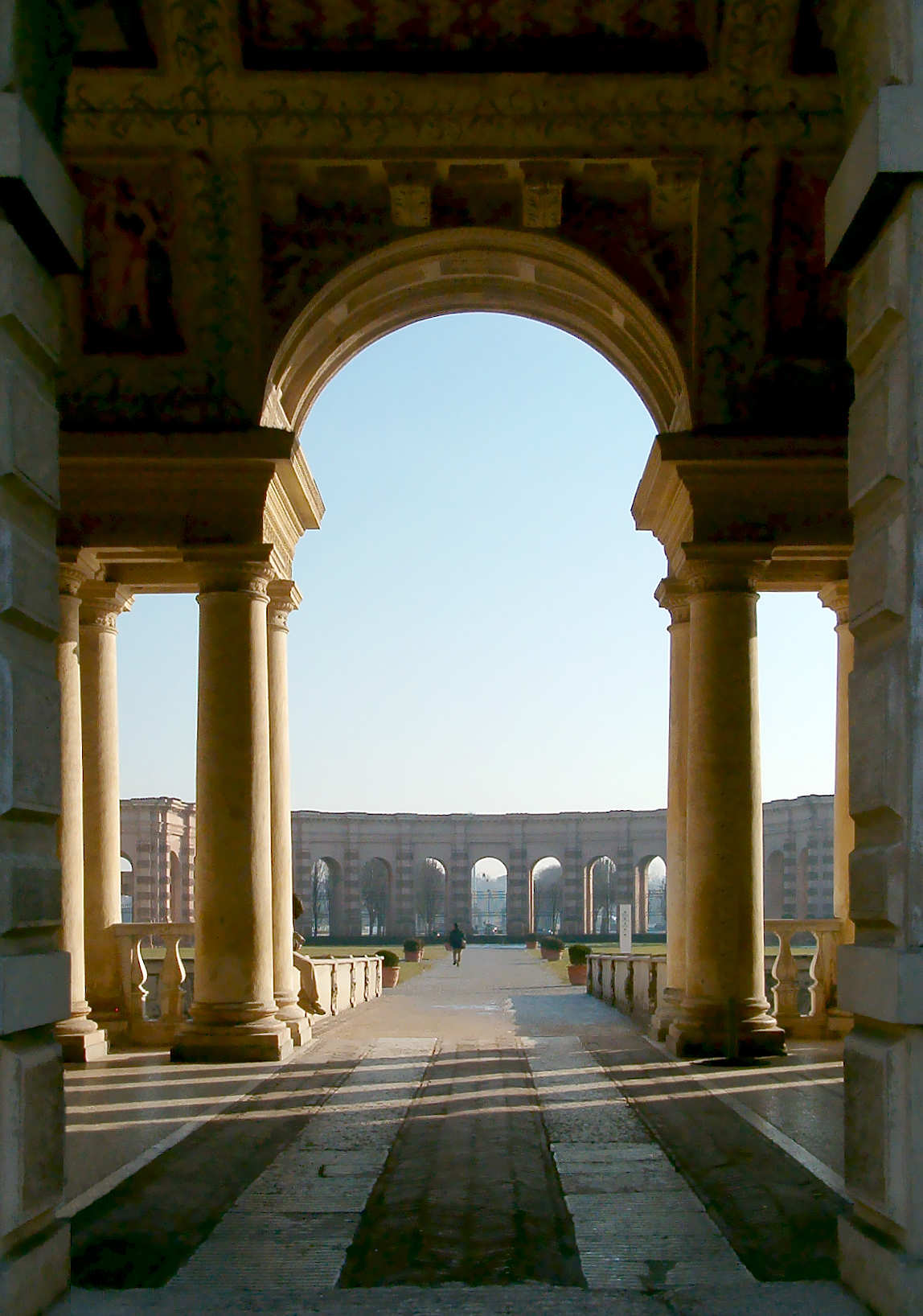
"Serlian window" archway

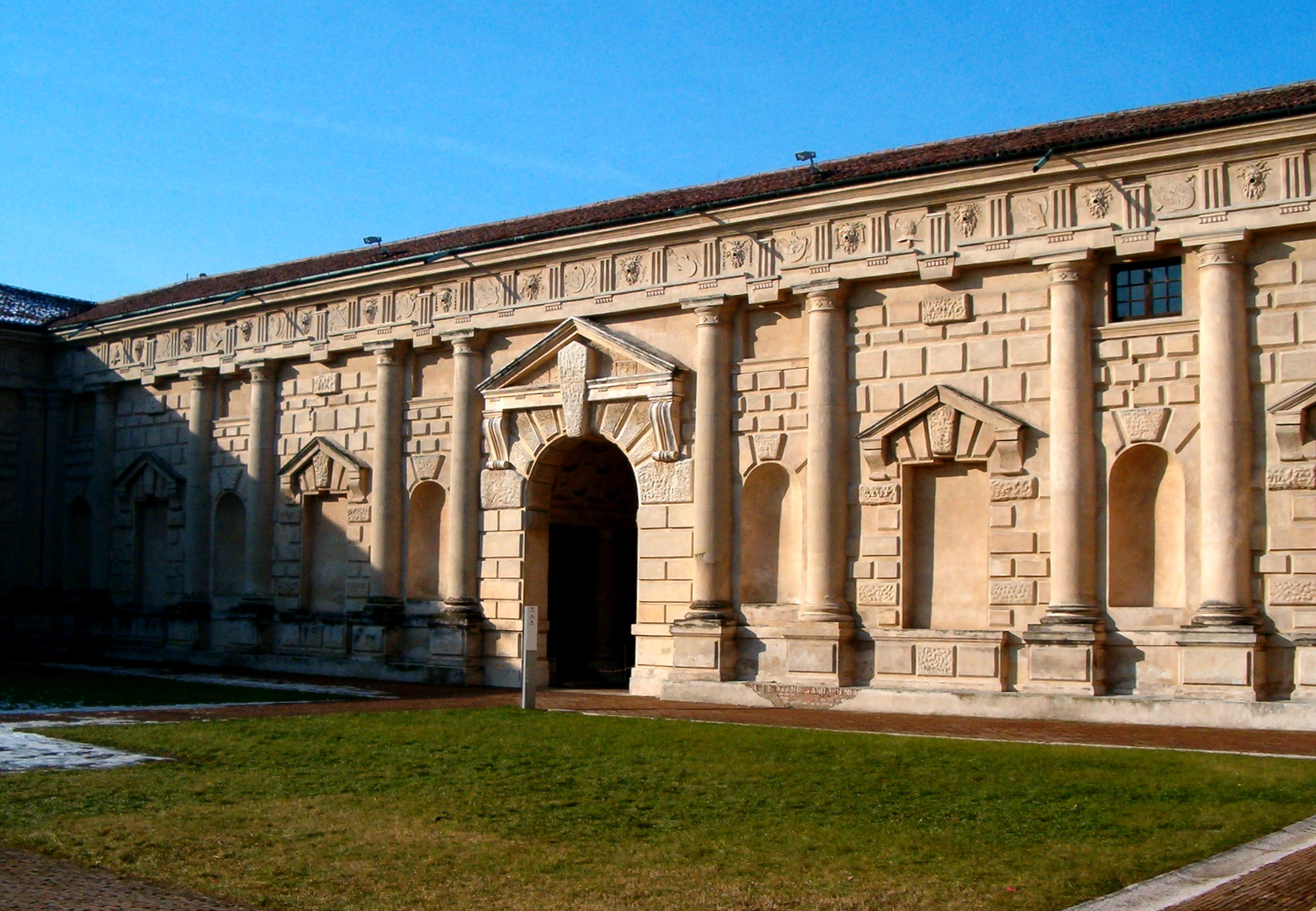
Cortile featuring "dropped" triglyphs

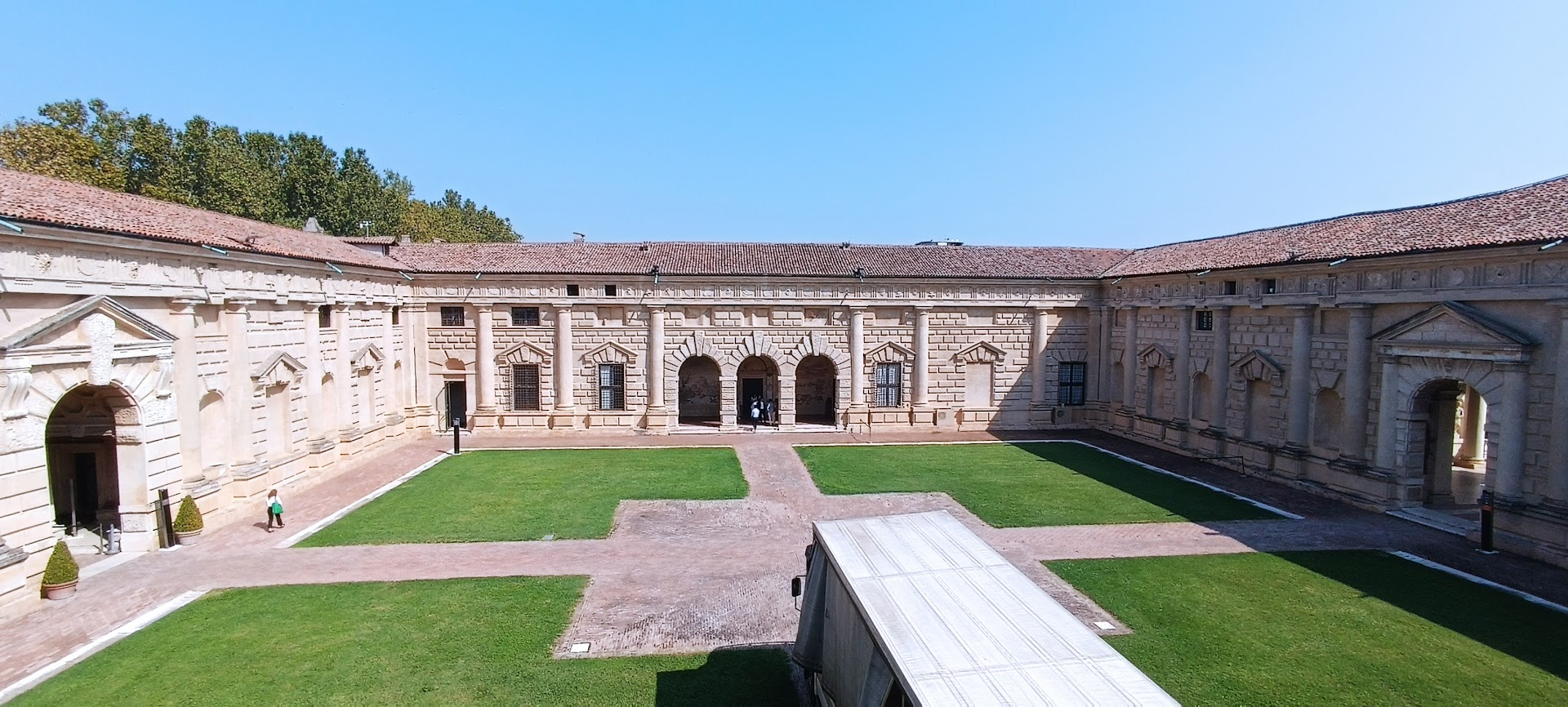
Courtyard

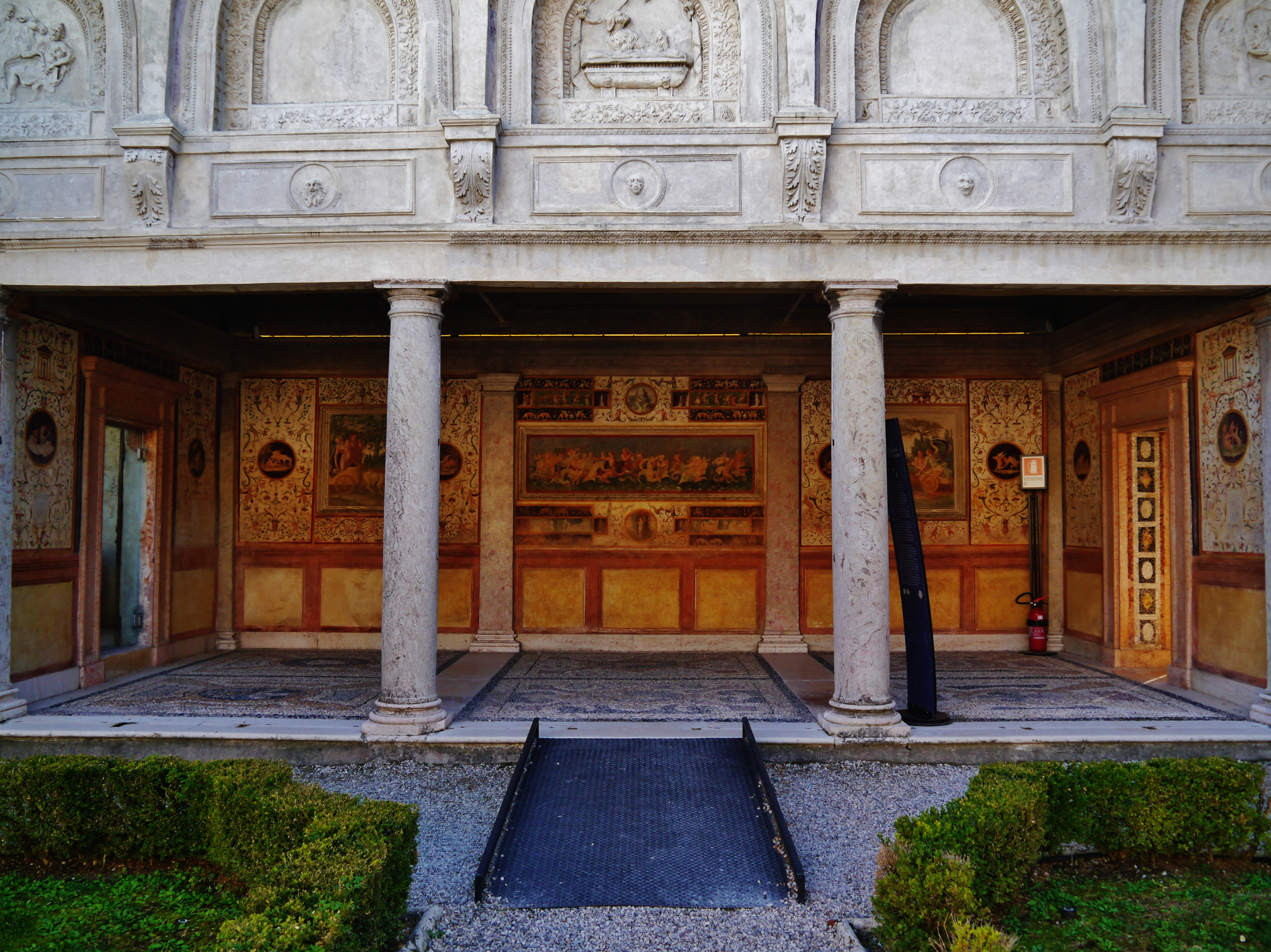
Secret Garden

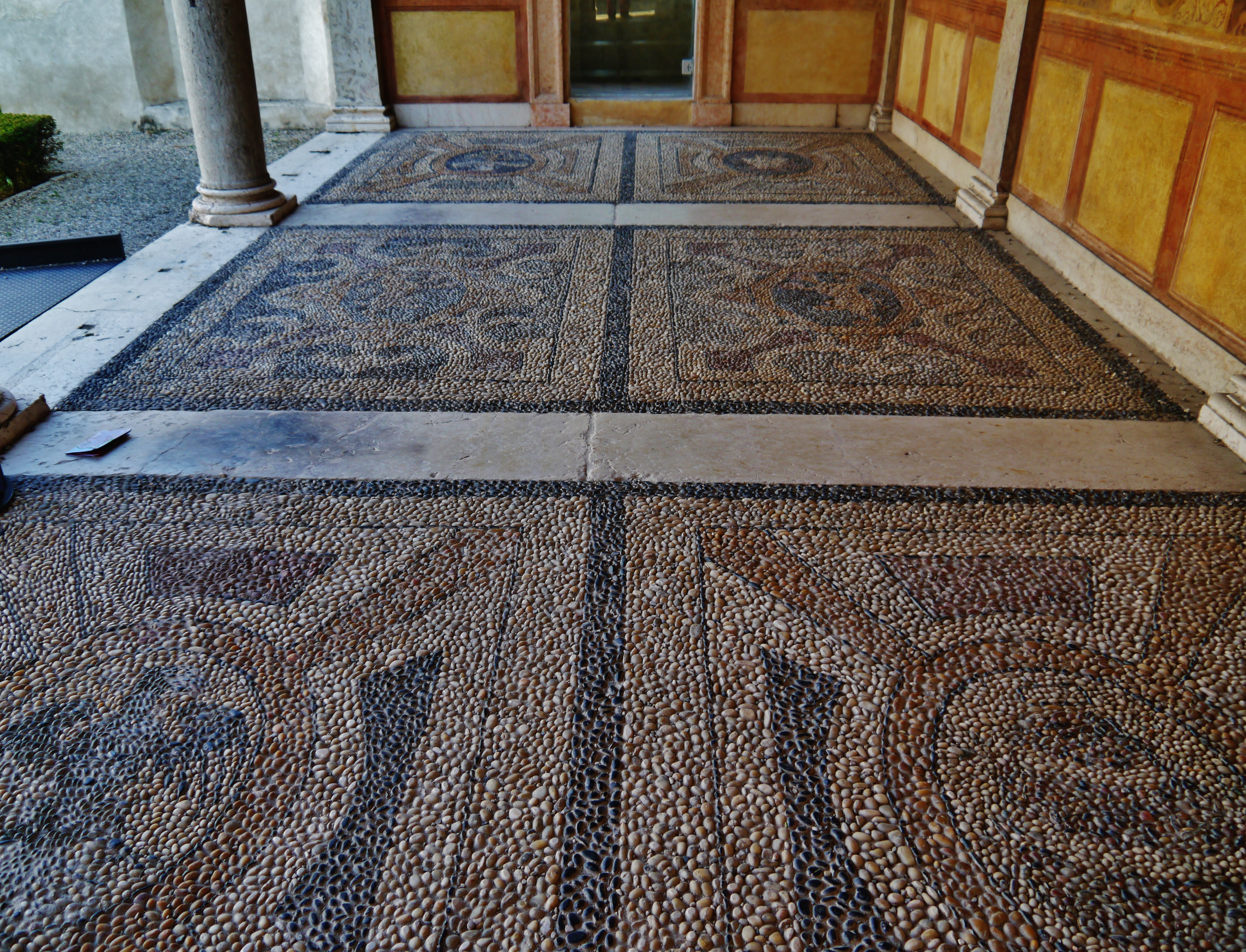
Floor of the Loggia in the Secret Garden

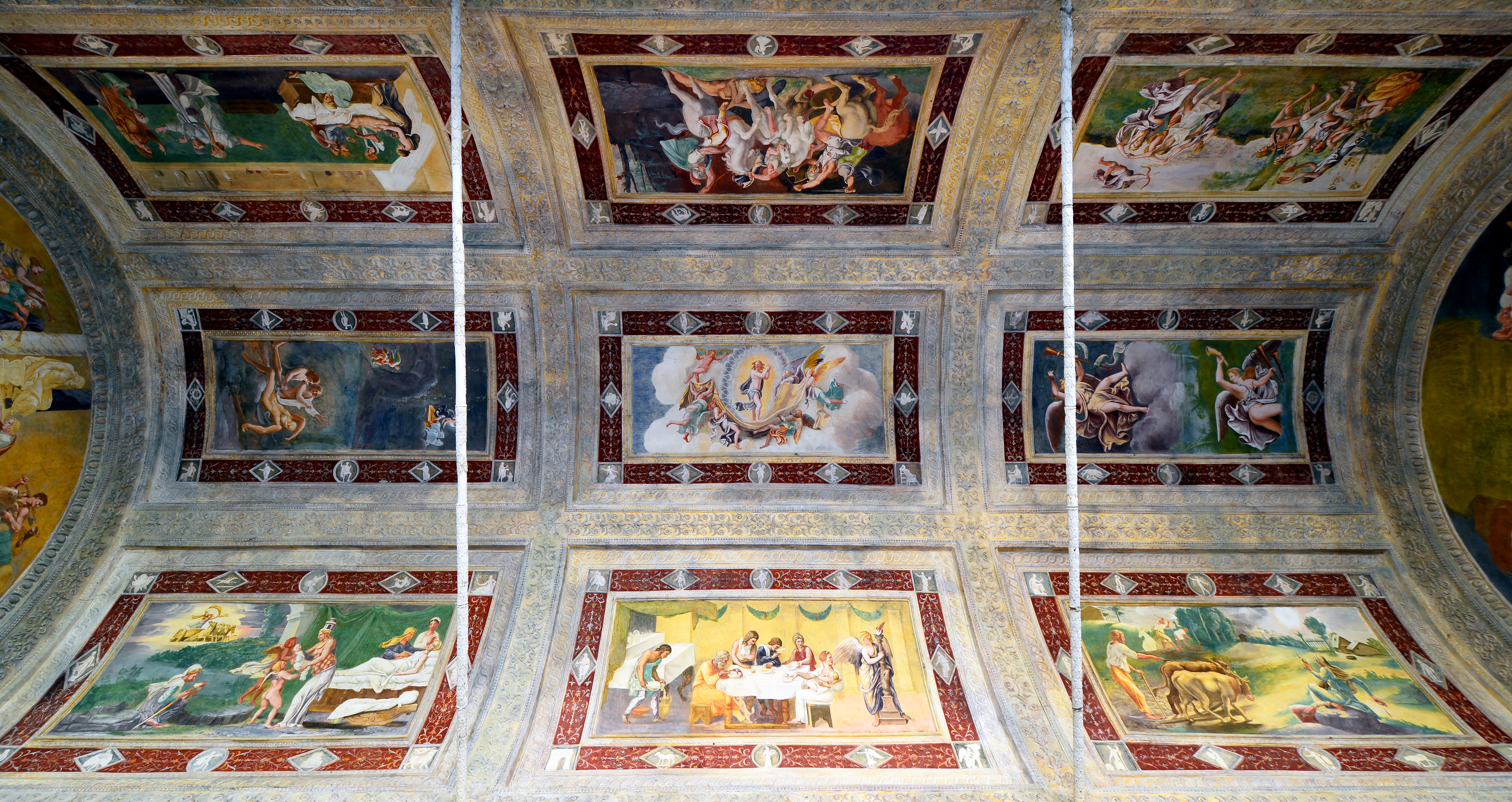
Ceiling of the loggia in the Secret Garden

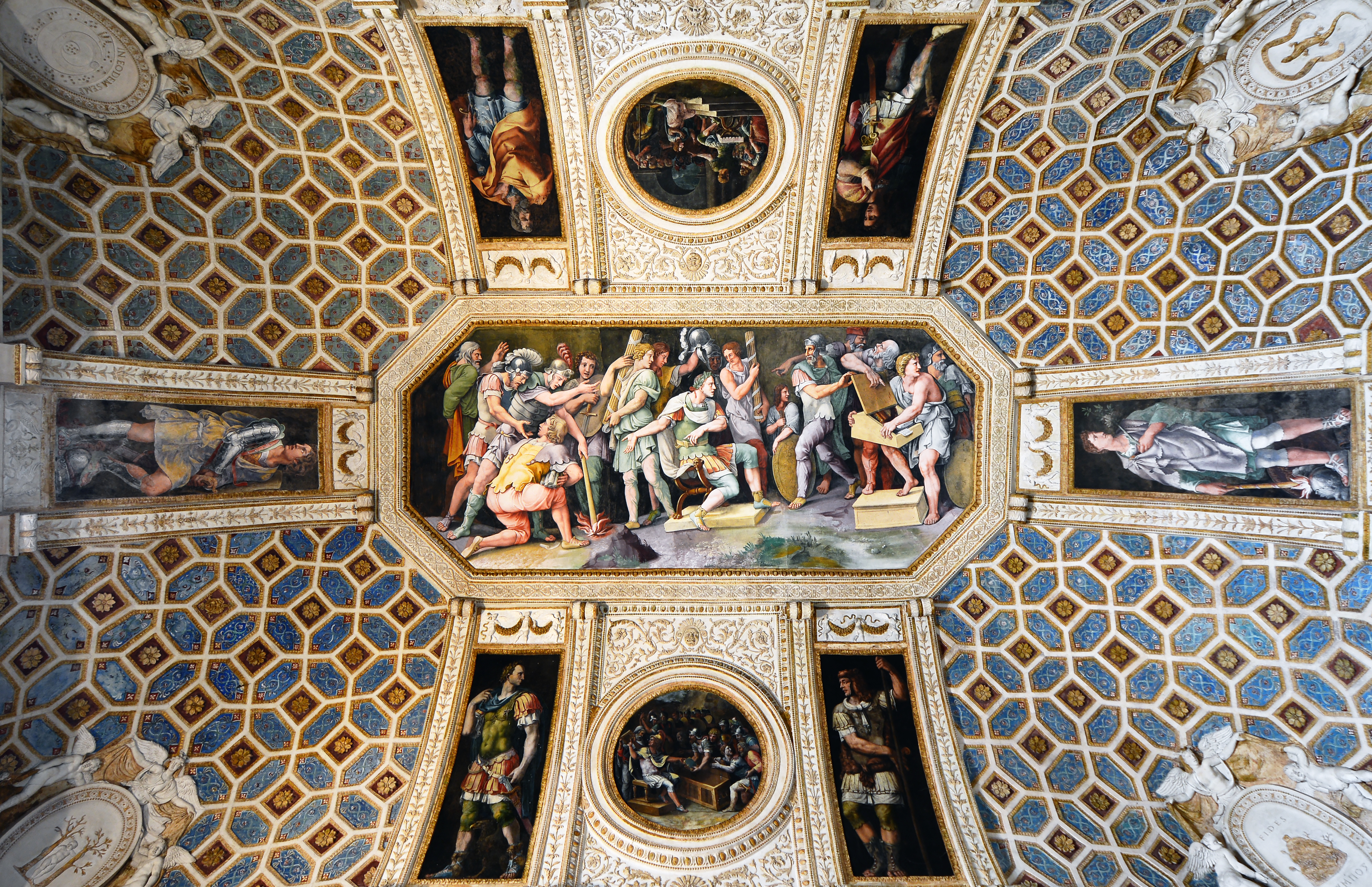
Ceiling of the Hall of the Caesars

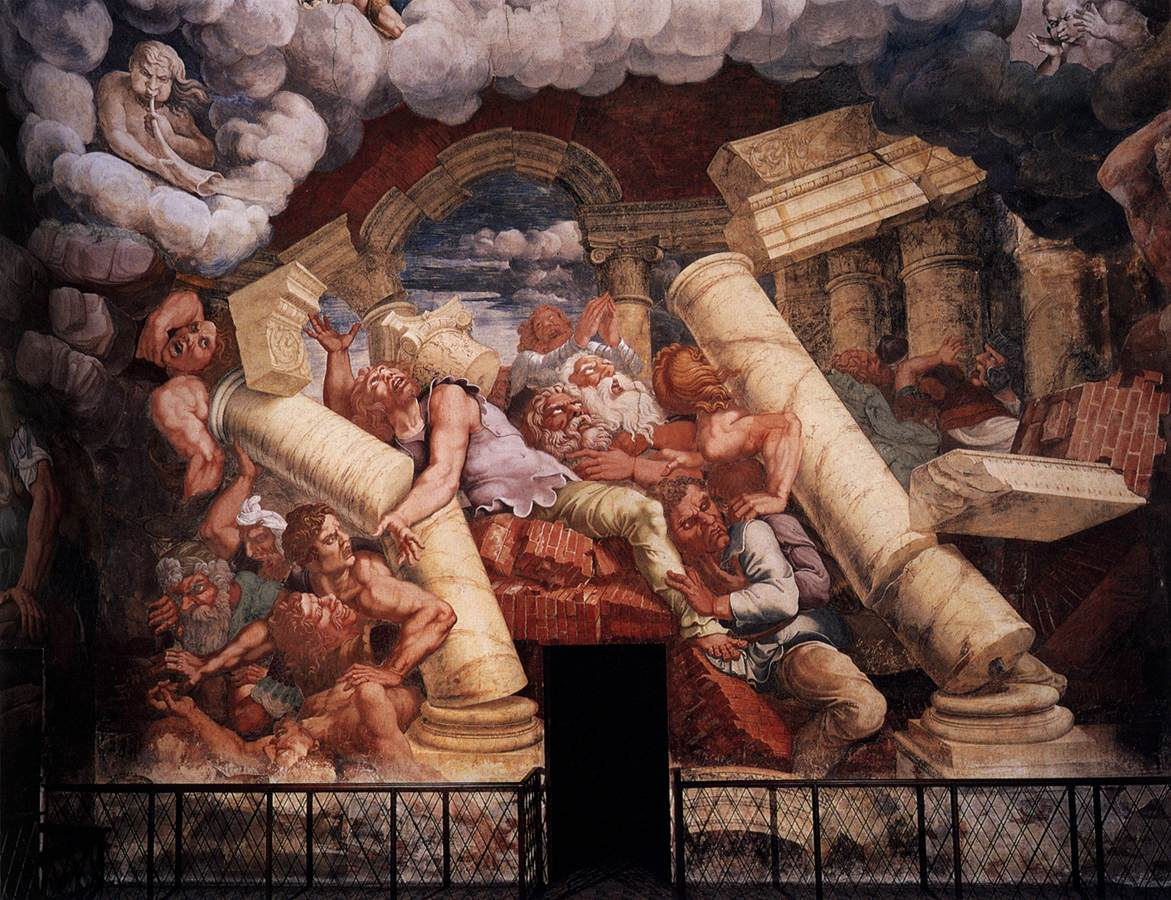
The Fall of the Giants (La Caduta dei Giganti)

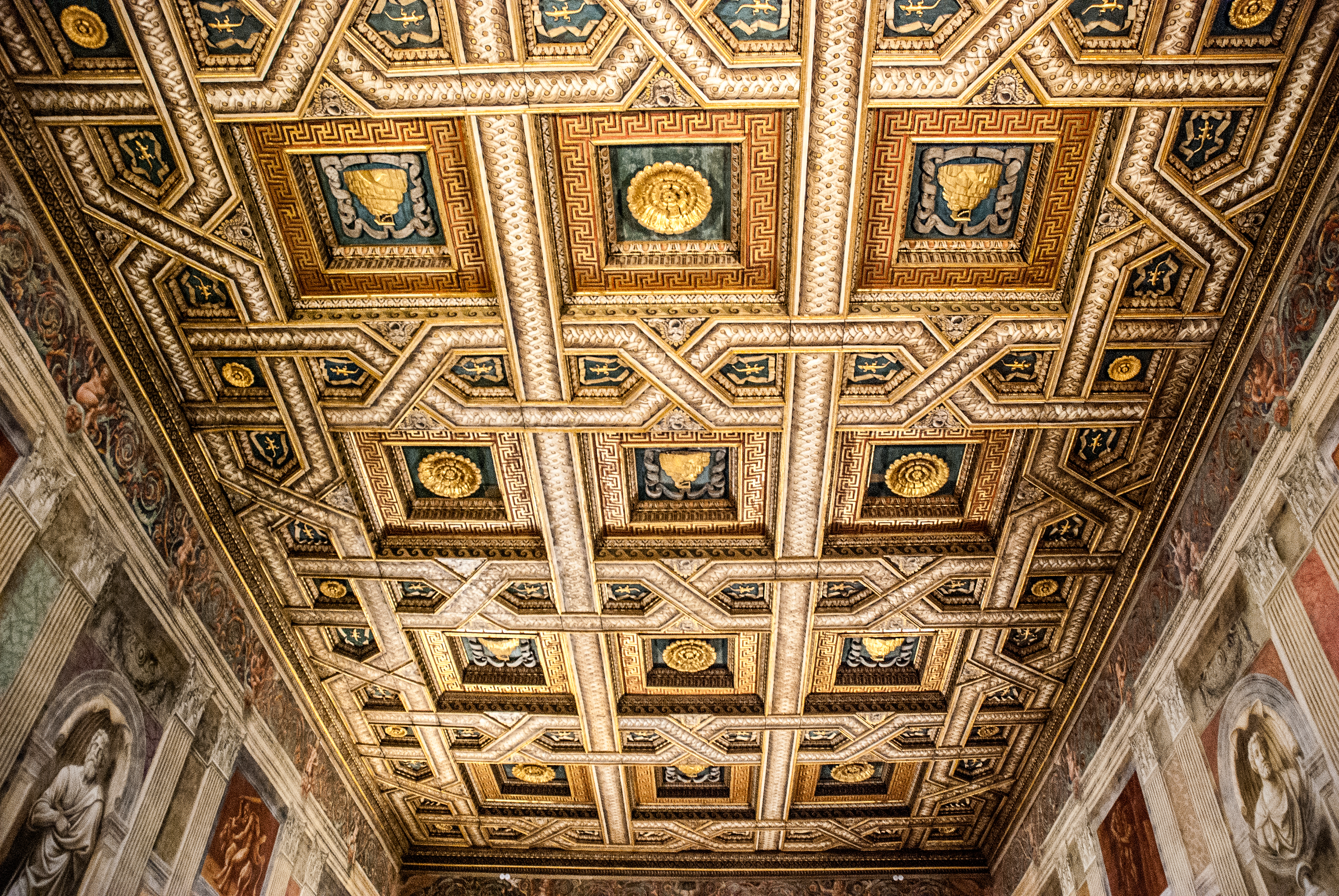
Hall of Horses (Salla dei Cavalli)

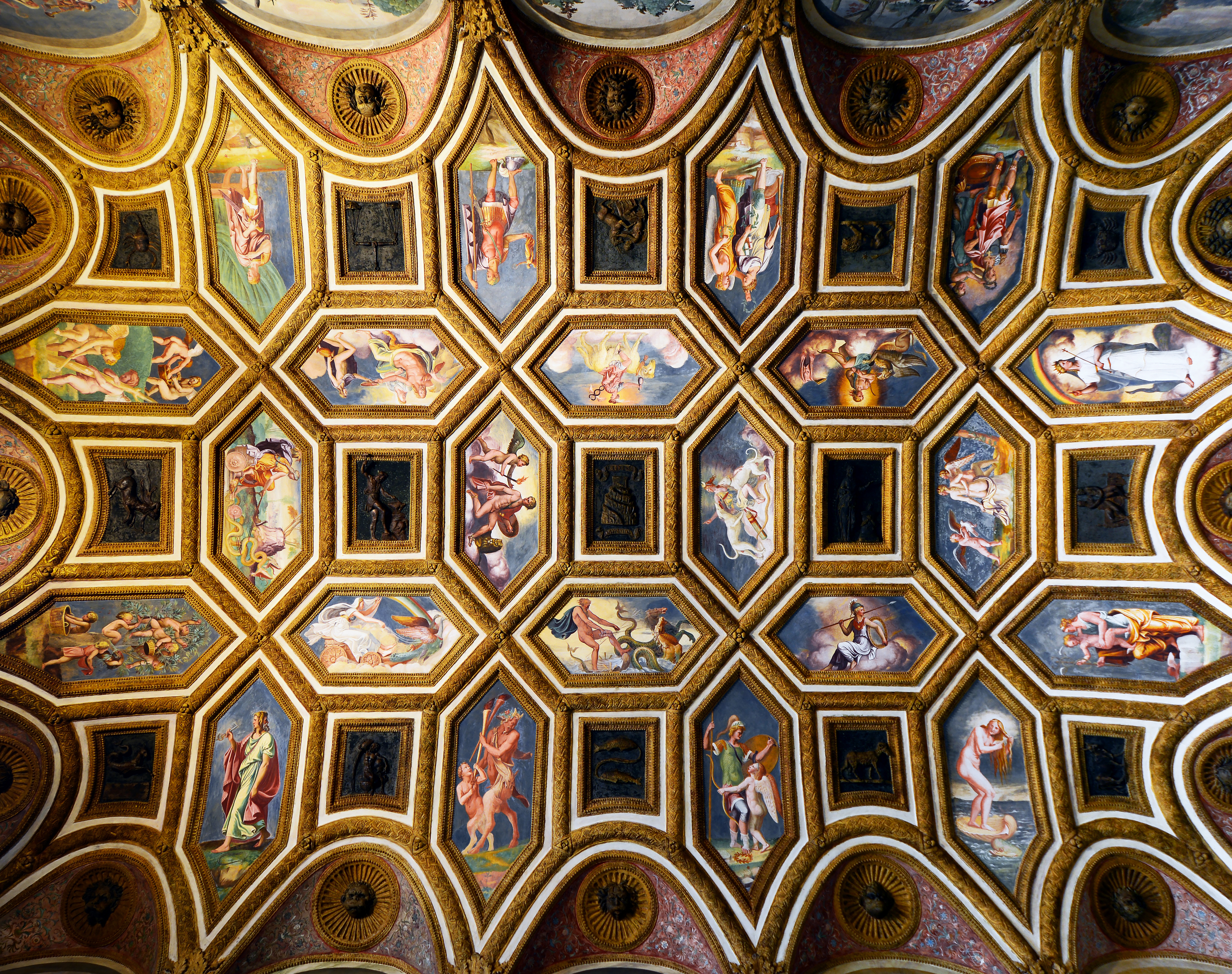
Ceiling of the Room of the Winds

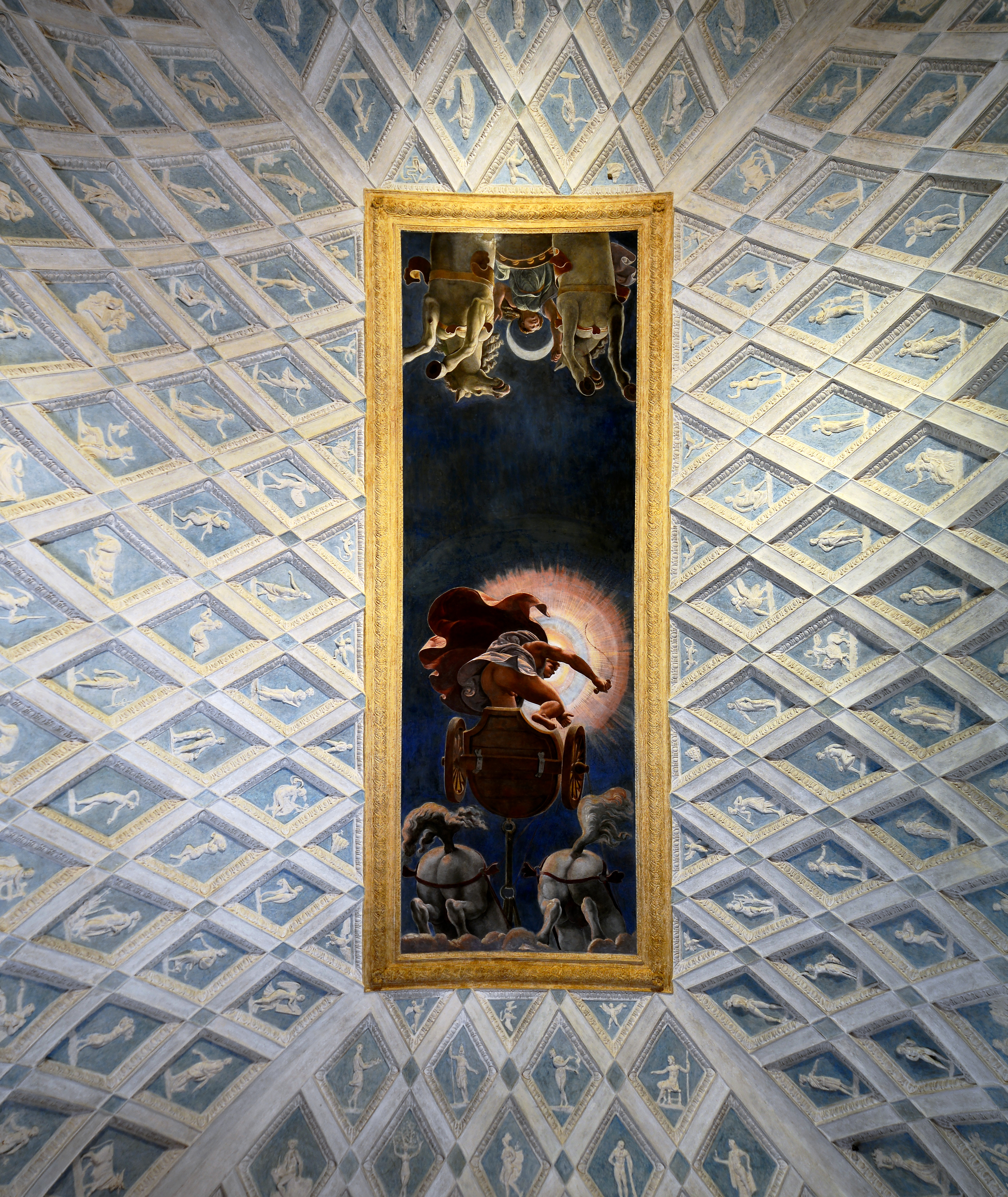
Ceiling of room of Night and Day

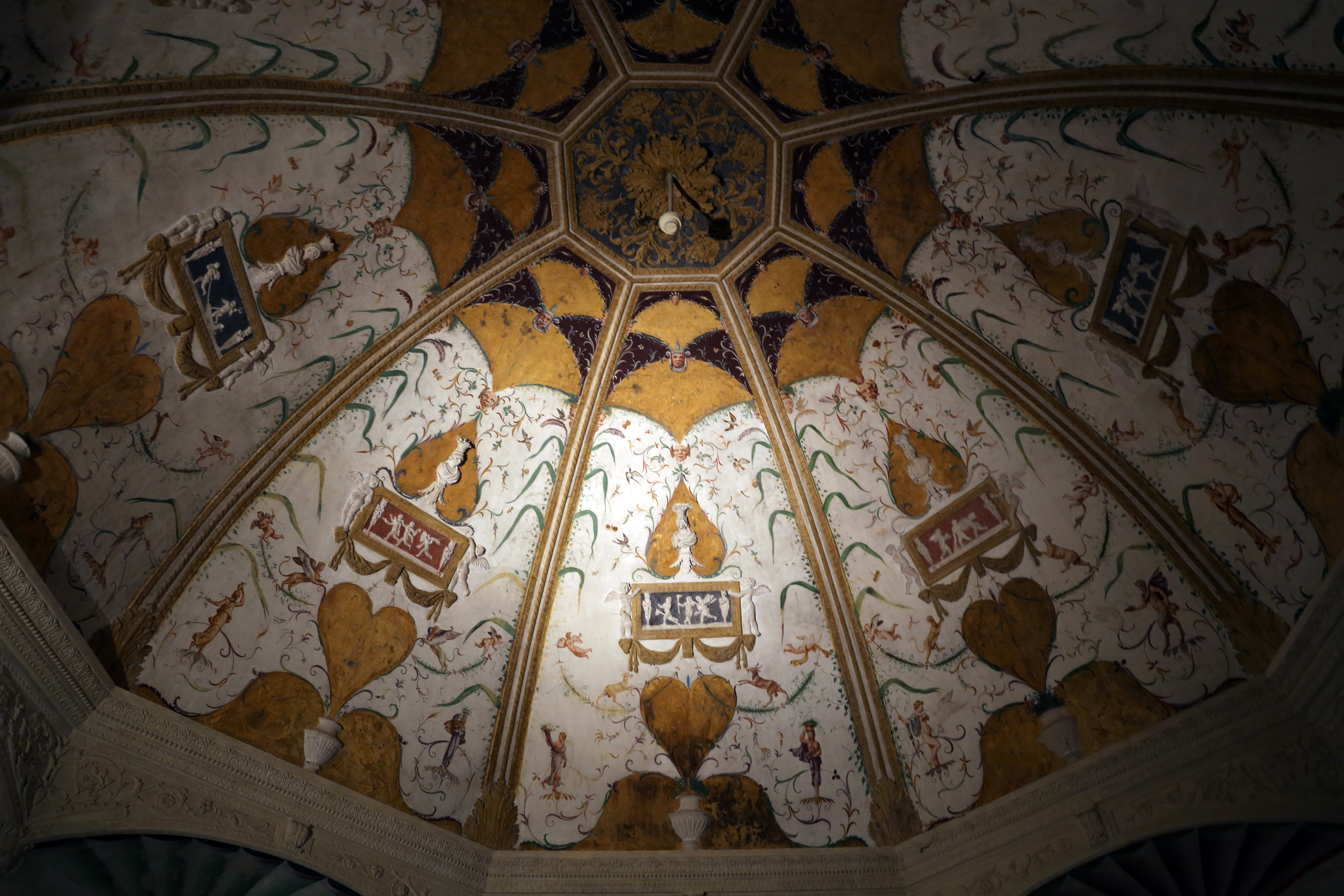
Camerino delle Grottesche: grotesque decorations by Andrea de' Conti and Luca da Faenza (1533)
