= Benedetto Pagni =

Italian painter

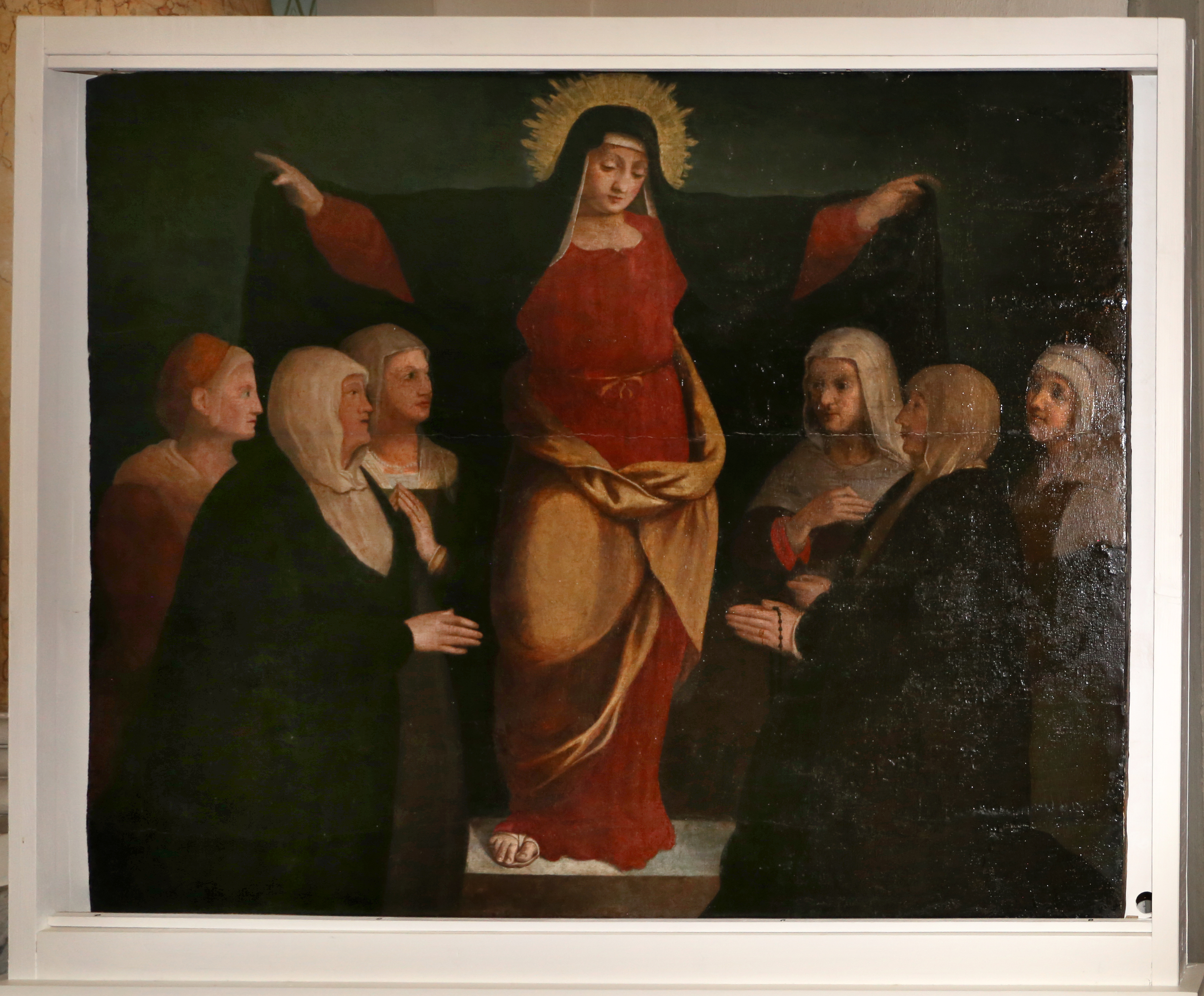
Madonna of Mercy by Benedetto Pagni da Pescia

Benedetto Pagni (died 1578) was an Italian painter of the Mannerist period, active mainly in Mantua and Pescia. He was part of the team of assistants of Giulio Romano in the decoration of the Palazzo del Te. He painted a Martyrdom of San Lorenzo for the Basilica of Sant'Andrea in Mantua. He painted a Marriage of Cana for the cathedral in Pescia.
