= Giulio Romano =

Italian painter and architect (1499–1546)

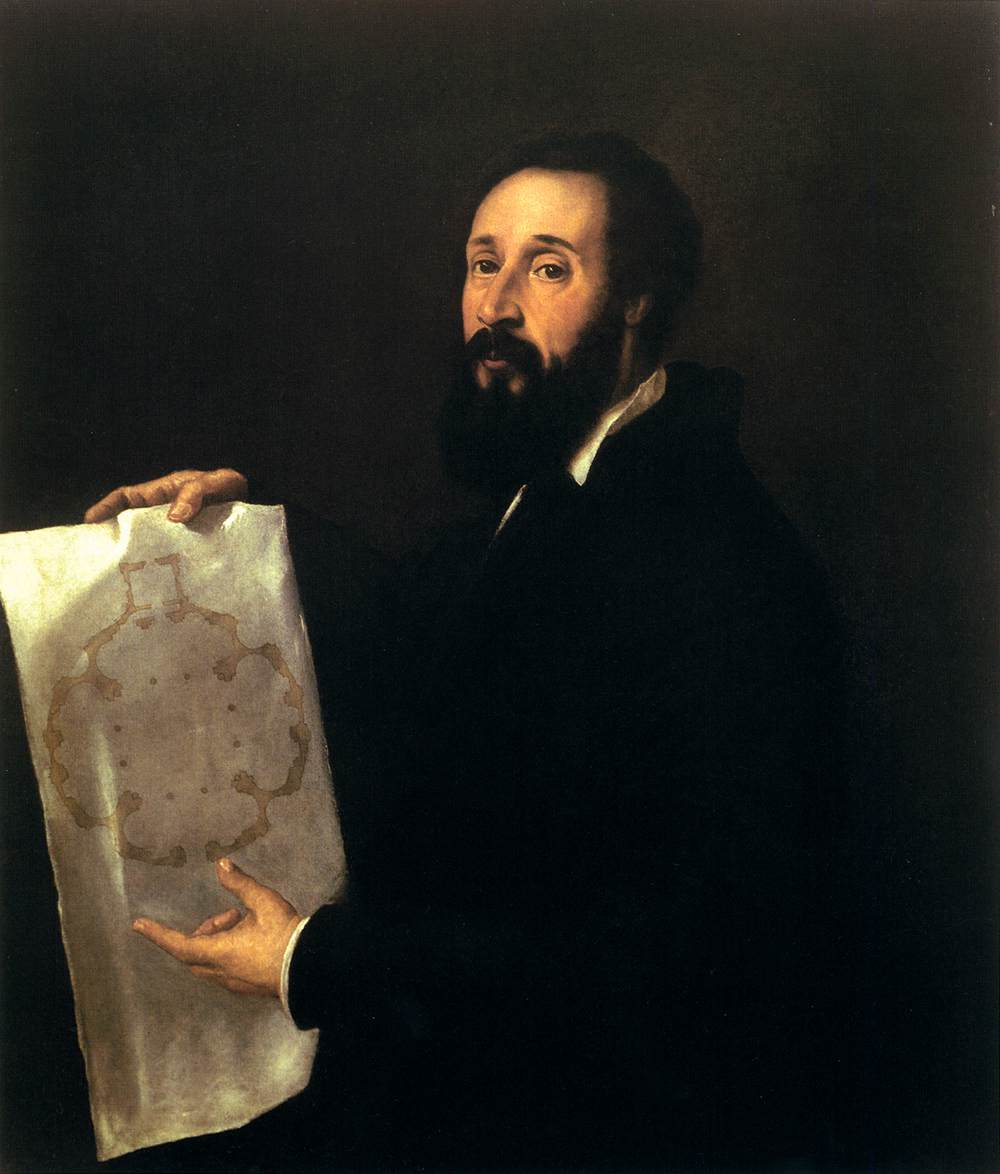
- Portrait of Giulio Romano (c. 1536), oil on canvas by Titian, 101×86 cm
- Born: Giulio Pippi c. 1499; Rome, Papal States
- Died: 1 November 1546 (aged 46–47); Mantua, Duchy of Mantua
- Known for: painting, fresco, architecture

Giulio Pippi (c. 1499 – 1 November 1546), known as Giulio Romano (US: /ˌdʒuːljoʊ rəˈmɑːnoʊ/ JOOL-yoh rə-MAH-noh( Italian: [ˈdʒuːljo roˈmaːno]) and sometimes known in French as Jules Romain, (Note: The French version of his name is sometimes incorrectly left untranslated into English documents.) was an Italian painter and architect. He was a pupil of Raphael, and his stylistic deviations from High Renaissance classicism help define the sixteenth-century style known as Mannerism. Giulio's drawings have long been treasured by collectors; contemporary prints of them engraved by Marcantonio Raimondi, were a significant contribution to the spread of sixteenth-century Italian style throughout Europe.

== Biography ==
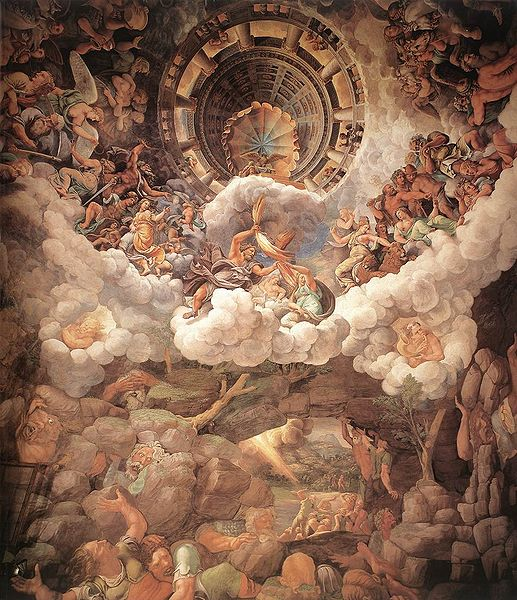
The fall of the Giants, fresco in Sala dei Giganti, Palazzo del Te, Mantua

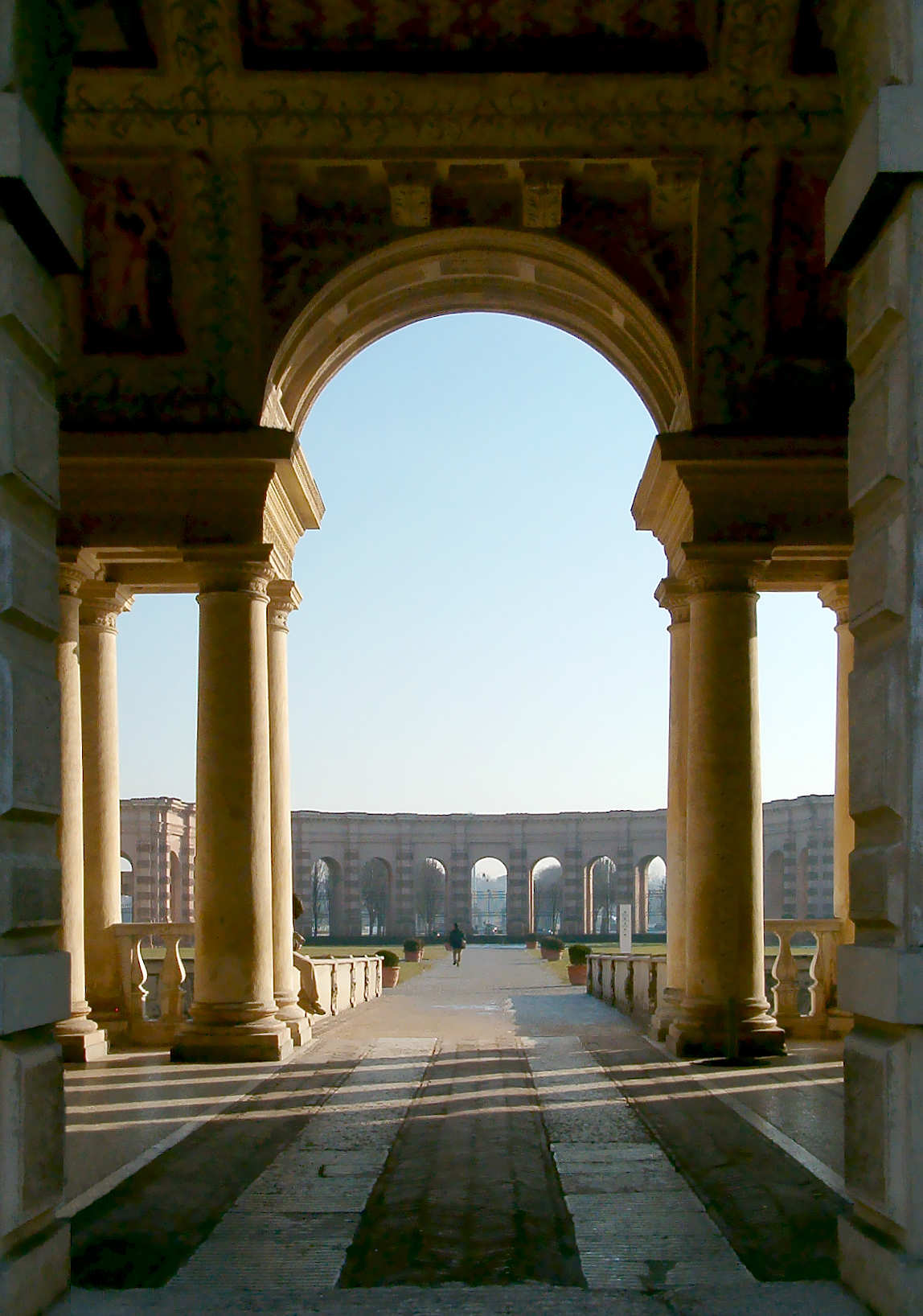
Palladian motif of the arches of the Palazzo Te, Mantua

Giulio Pippi was born in Rome, and he began his career there as a young assistant to the leading painter and architect Raphael. He became an important member of Raphael's large team working on the frescoes in the Raphael Rooms and Vatican loggias using designs by Raphael and, later, painting a group of figures in the Fire in the Borgo fresco. He also collaborated on the decoration of the ceiling of the Villa Farnesina. Despite his relative youth, he increasingly became indispensable to the master and after the death of Raphael in 1520, he took a leading role in completing the Vatican commissions, designing the frescoes of the life of Constantine as well as completing Raphael's Coronation of the Virgin and the Transfiguration in the Vatican. In Rome, Giulio decorated the Villa Madama for Cardinal Giuliano de' Medici, afterward Clement VII. The crowded frescoes he designed lack the stately and serene simplicity of his master.

On Raphael's death, Michelangelo attempted to take over completion of the commission for the Raphael Rooms at the Vatican, but along with Perino del Vaga, Giulio was able to keep it, as they had the drawings for much of the uncompleted work that was being executed under the supervision of Raphael.

From 1522 he was courted by Federico Gonzaga, ruler of Mantua, who wanted him as court artist, apparently especially attracted by his skill as an architect. The contemporaneous historian of the Renaissance, Giorgio Vasari (1511–1574), tells how Baldassare Castiglione was delegated by Gonzaga to procure Giulio to execute paintings as well as architectural and engineering projects for the duchy of Mantua. In late 1524, Giulio agreed to move to Mantua, where he remained for the rest of his life. In Mantua, rather than his given name, "Giulio Romano" was used to identify him by his geographical origin because he was not a native artist. Mantua is where he executed his most well-known work; hence that name became associated with him thereafter. His move to Mantua meant he escaped the disaster of the Sack of Rome in 1527, which hugely disrupted artistic patronage in Rome and dispersed the remainder of Raphael's workshop.

His masterpiece of architecture and fresco painting in Mantua is the suburban Palazzo Te, with its famous illusionistic frescoes (c. 1525–1535) and his use of the Palladian motif for arches used in the design. He also helped rebuild the ducal palace in Mantua, reconstructed the cathedral, and designed the nearby Church of San Benedetto Po. Giulio sculpted the figure of Christ that is positioned above Castiglione's tomb in the church of Santa Maria delle Grazie, in Curtatone, near Mantua. Sections of Mantua that had been flood-prone were refurbished under Giulio's direction and the duke's patronage and friendship never faltered. The studio he established in Mantua became a popular school of art. Giulio's annual income amounted to more than 1000 ducats.

In Italian Renaissance tradition, many works by Giulio were only temporary. According to Vasari:

When Charles V came to Mantua, Romano, by the duke's order, made many fine arches, scenes for comedies and other things, in which he had no peer, no one being like him for masquerades, and making curious costumes for jousts, feasts, tournaments, which excited great wonder in the emperor and in all present. For the city of Mantua at various times he designed temples, chapels, houses, gardens, facades, and was so fond of decorating them that, by his industry, he rendered dry, healthy and pleasant places previously miry, full of stagnant water, and almost uninhabitable.

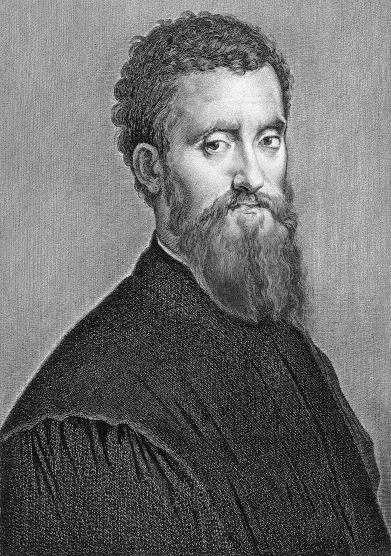
Giulio Romano selfportrait, was copied in an engraving by Jean-Louis Potrelle (1788-1824)

He travelled to France in the first half of the sixteenth century and brought concepts of the Italian style to the French court of Francis I.

Giulio designed tapestries as well. It also is rumored that he contributed to a collection of drawings upon which a group entitled, I Modi, was engraved by Marcantonio Raimondi. All of those original drawings are said to have been destroyed because the content was no longer considered socially acceptable.

Giulio Romano has the distinction of being the only Renaissance artist to be mentioned by William Shakespeare. In Act V, Scene II of The Winter's Tale, the statue of Queen Hermione that was described as coming to life during the play was identified by the bard as having been sculpted by "that rare Italian master, Julio Romano".

He died in Mantua in 1546. According to Vasari, his best pupils were Giovanni dal Lione, Raffaellino dal Colle, Benedetto Pagni, Figurino da Faenza, Giovanni Battista Bertani and his brother Rinaldo, and Fermo Guisoni.

== Architecture ==
On the whole, Giulio Romano was more influential as an architect than as a painter, and his works had an enormous impact on Italian Mannerist architecture. He learned architecture the same way he learned painting, as an increasingly trusted assistant to Raphael, who was appointed the papal architect in 1514, and his early works are very much in Raphael's style. The project for the Villa Madama outside Rome, built by the future Medici Pope Clement VII, was given to Giulio on Raphael's death. It already shows his taste for playful surprises within the style of Renaissance classical architecture. Planned on a huge scale, it was incomplete by the Sack of Rome and was never finished.

The Villa Lante al Gianicolo (1520–21) was a smaller suburban villa in Rome, with a famous view over the city. Romano made the whole building suggest lightness and elegance to exploit the ridge-top position and to overcome the rather small Roman footprint. The orders are delicate, with Tuscan or Doric columns and pilasters in pairs on the main floor, and extremely shallow Ionic pilasters above, whose presence is mainly conveyed by a different colour. Alternate loggia openings are heightened by arches above the entablature. Romano's willingness to play with the conventions of the classical orders is already in evidence; the Doric here has guttae, but no triglyphs, on its narrow entablature. The volutes of the Ionic capitals are repeated in the window surrounds between them: "The canonic orders here begin to be treated visually as independent from their structural purposes, and this liberation offered the architect new expressive possibilities."

His last building in Rome, the Palazzo Maccarani Stati (started 1522–23), was a considerable contrast, being a palazzo in the city centre, with shops on the ground floor, and a massive, imposing feel. The rustication and exaggerated size of keystones that were to be so prominent in his later buildings in Mantua are already present on the ground floor, which dispenses with any classical order, but the two upper floors have increasingly shallow orders in pilasters, somewhat in the manner of the Villa Lante.

His first building in Mantua has remained his most famous work in architecture. The Palazzo del Te was a palace of leisure outside the city that was begun around 1524 and completed a decade later. Here Giulio was able, because of the function of the building, to indulge to the full his playful inventiveness.

== Selected paintings and drawings ==
- Deesis with Saint Paul and Saint Catherine - Parma
- The Stoning of St. Stephen (Santo Stefano, Genoa): "Giulio never did a finer work than this," said Vasari. Domenico del Barbiere engraved the subject, so that it influenced designers who never saw the original in Genoa.
- Adoration of the Magi (Louvre)
- Fire in the Borgo, fresco (Raphael Rooms in Vatican City)
- Emblematic Figures, pen and brown ink and wash over graphite (Fine Arts Museum of San Francisco)
- Portrait of a Young Woman, after a design by Raphael, and later modified by Raphael (Musée des Beaux-Arts de Strasbourg)
- The Battle of the Milvian Bridge
- The Triumph of Titus and Vespasian
- Portrait of Doña Isabel de Requesens y Enriquez de Cardona-Anglesola
- Madonna of the Cat (National Museum of Capodimonte, Naples, 1522–23)
- Noli me tangere, Prado Museum, Madrid
- Adoration of the Shepherds in collaboration with Giovanni Francesco Penni, Prado Museum, Madrid
Gallery of paintings by Giulio Romano

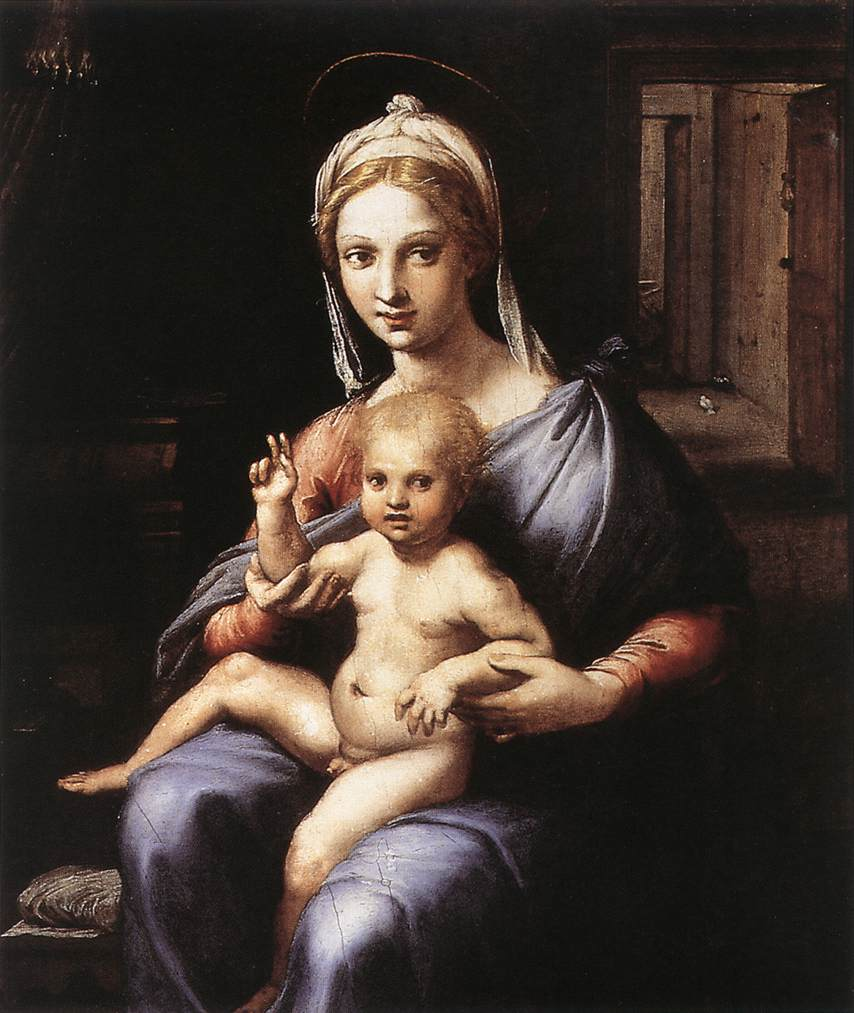
Madonna & Child, c. 1523

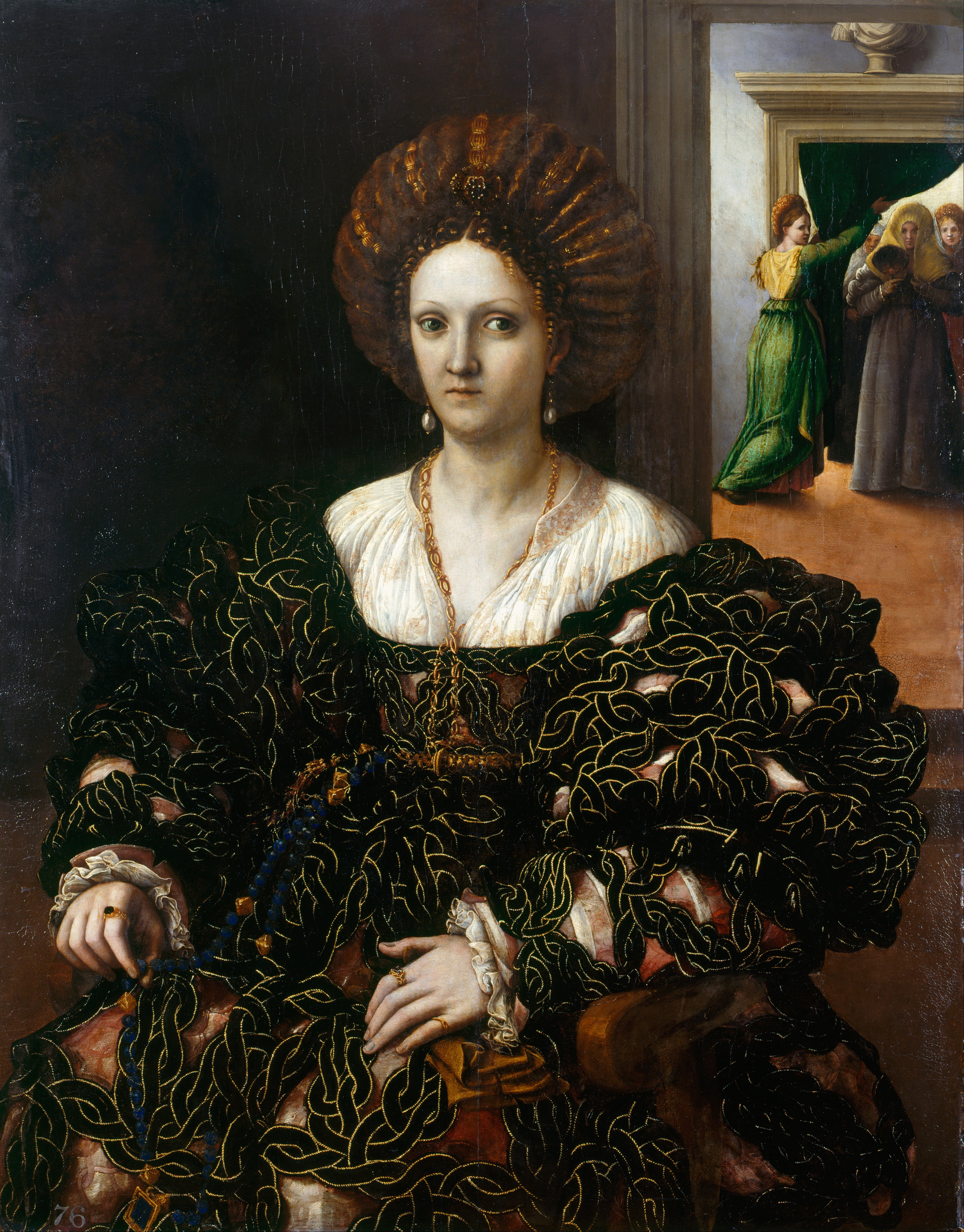
Margherita Paleologo (1510–66)

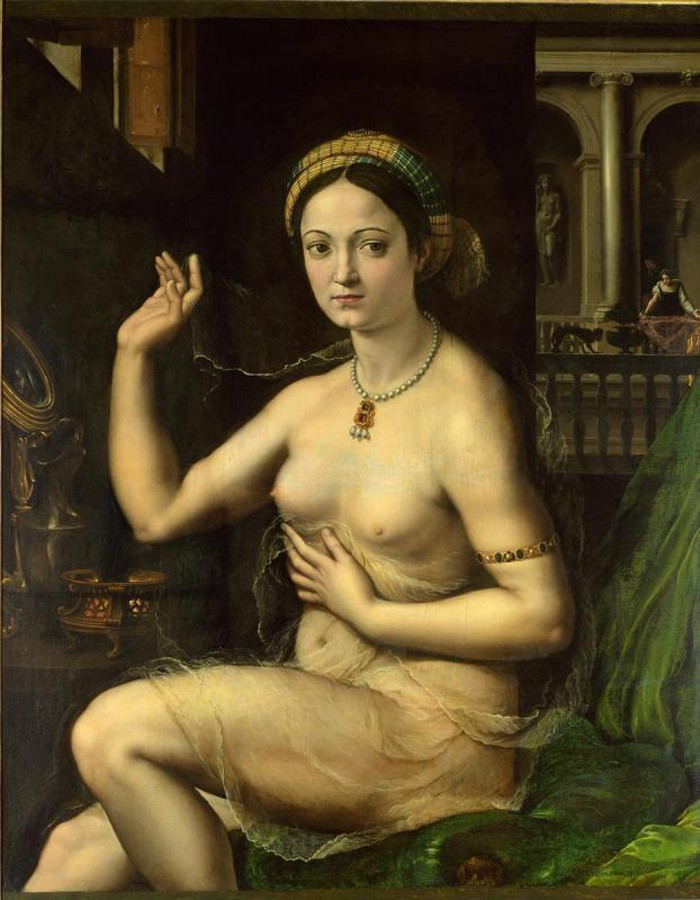
Donna alla toeletta, 1520

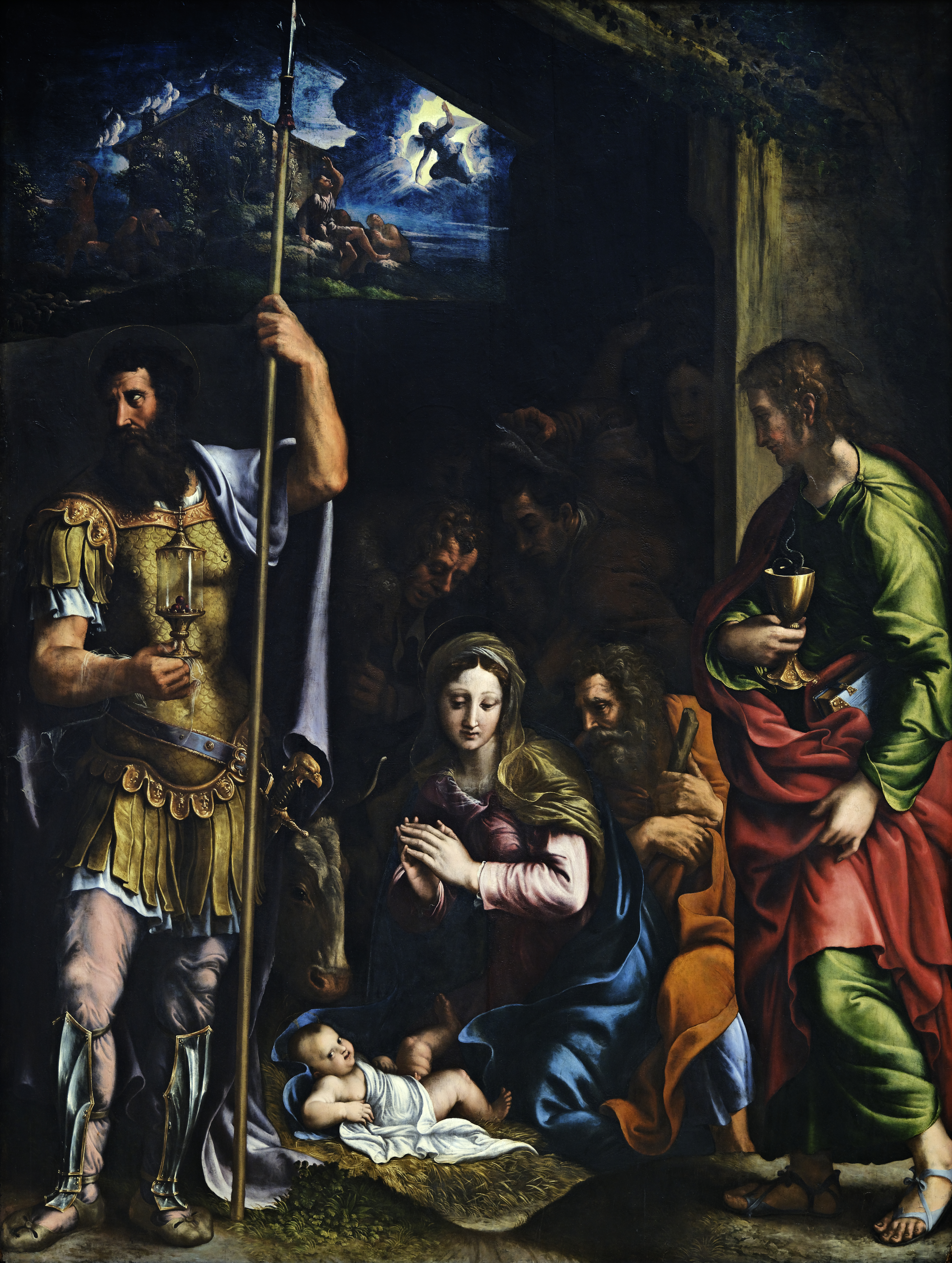
Adoration of the Shepherds

Portrait of Doña Isabel de Requesens (with the possible intervention of Raphael)

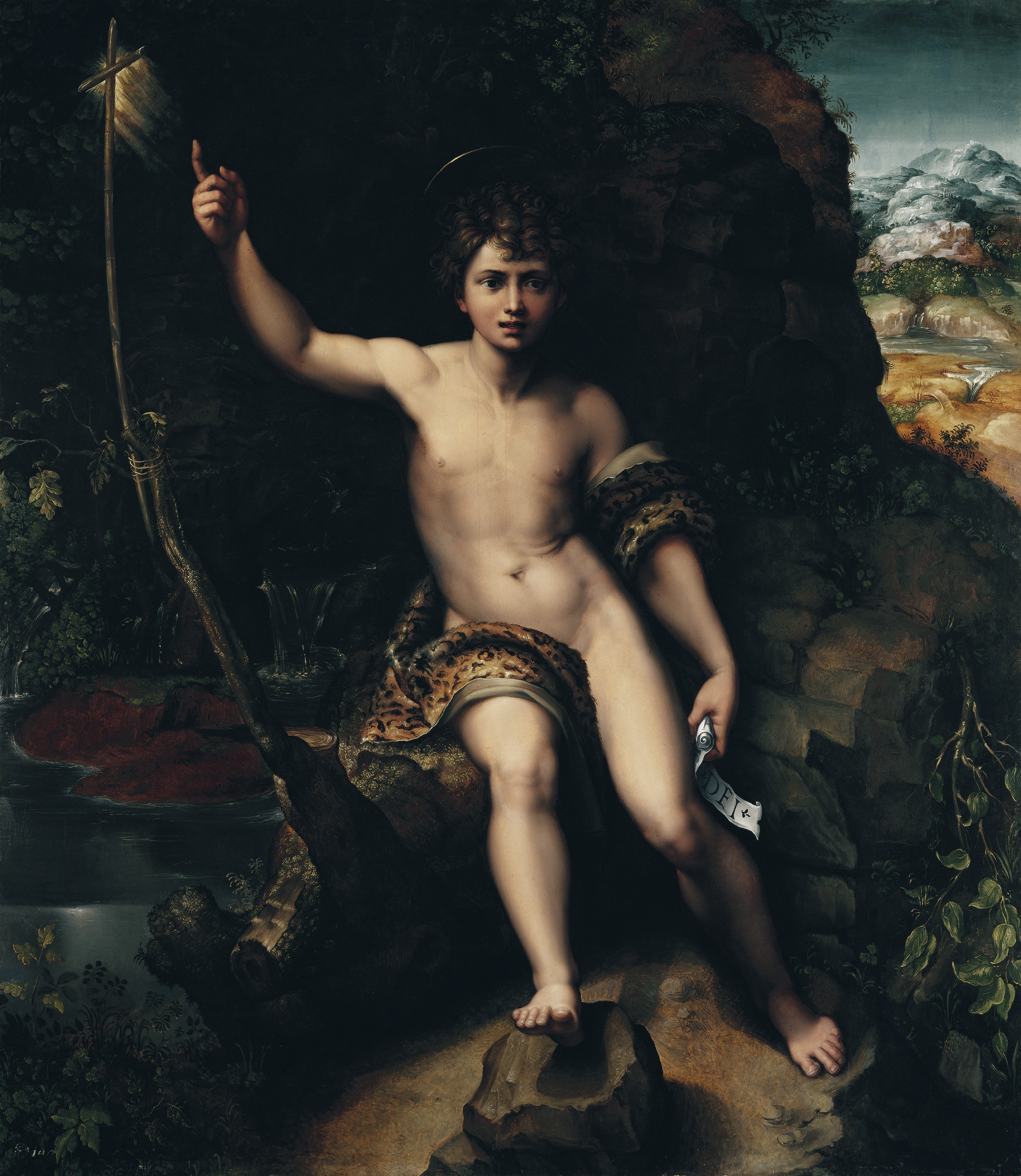
St. John the Baptist in the Wilderness

== Bibliography ==
- Talvacchia, Bette, "Giulio Romano." Grove Art Online, Oxford Art Online, Oxford University Press, accessed March 30, 2016, subscription required
