= The Lovers (disambiguation) =

The Lovers is a trump or "Major Arcana" tarot card.

The Lovers may also refer to:

== Art ==
- The Lovers (Abbasi), a 1630 painting by Reza Abbasi
- The Lovers (Daen), a 1964 public sculpture by Lindsay Daen
- The Lovers (di Suvero), a 1971 public sculpture by Mark di Suvero
- The Lovers (Friant), an 1888 painting by Émile Friant
- The Lovers (Master of the Housebook), c.1480 double portrait painting by the Master of the Housebook
- The Lovers (Giulio Romano), a 1525 painting by Giulio Romano
- The Lovers (Titian), a c. 1510 painting attributed to Titian
- The Lovers (Magritte), a series of four paintings by René Magritte

== Film and television ==
=== Film ===
- The Lovers (1946 film), an Italian film
- The Lovers (1951 film), a Mexican film
- The Lovers (1958 film) (Les Amants), a French film directed by Louis Malle
- The Lovers! (1973 film), based on the British TV series
- The Lovers (1994 film), a Hong Kong film directed by Tsui Hark
- The Lovers (2013 film), previously known as Singularity, by Roland Joffé
- The Lovers (2017 film), a comedy drama starring Debra Winger and Tracy Letts
- The Lovers (2026 film), an independent Philippine short film directed by Sophia O. Paez and Alice Mao

=== Television ===
- The Lovers (Saturday Night Live), a recurring series of Saturday Night Live sketches
- The Lovers (1970 TV series), a 1970–1971 British sitcom
- The Lovers (2023 TV series), a Sky Atlantic series
- "The Lovers" (Auf Wiedersehen, Pet), a 1984 episode
- "The Lovers" (Danger Man), a 1960 episode
- "The Lovers" (Soulmates), a 2020 episode

== Literature ==
- The Lovers (Farmer novella and novel), a 1952 novella, expanded into a 1961 novel, by Philip José Farmer
- The Lovers (West novel), a 1993 novel by Morris West
- The Lovers, a 2010 novel by Vendela Vida

== Music ==
- The Lovers (band), a UK-based French electronica/pop band
- The Lovers, a 1950s R&B duo of Tarheel Slim and Little Ann
- The Lovers (album) or the title song, by the Legendary Pink Dots, 1984
- "The Lovers" (Alexander O'Neal song), 1988
- "The Lovers", a song by Nine Inch Nails from Add Violence, 2017
- "The Lovers"/"The Lovers (Love Is the Lover)", a song by The Future Sound of London, under their Amorphous Androgynous alias, 2004/06
- The Lovers (musical), a 2022 Australian musical theatre adaptation of A Midsummer Night's Dream

== Philosophy ==
- Rival Lovers or The Lovers, a Socratic dialogue

== See also ==
- Lover (disambiguation), including uses of Lovers
- The Lover (disambiguation)
