= Hanna Levy Vroman =

Background information
- Born: October 25, 1940 (age 86); Jerusalem, Israel
- Occupations: Composer, Musical Producer, Music Teacher, Choir Conductor
- Spouse: Benjamin Levy

Hanna Levy Vroman (born 25 October 1940) is an Israeli composer, lyricist, conductor and musical producer. She was married to the artist Benjamin Levy until his passing and is a mother to 4 children.

== Biography ==
Levy Vroman was born in Jerusalem and is the daughter of Akiva Jaap Vroman, a geology professor and an Israel Prize laureate, and to Gonny DeLeo Vroman, a piano teacher, both of them born in The Netherlands. Levy Vroman started playing the piano at the age of 5. After finishing her studies in the Bialik Gymnasium in Haifa, she served her military service in the Northern Command Performance Group (Lehakat Pikud Tzafon). Levy Vroman married the artist Benjamin Levy in 1962, after finishing her studies at the music institute at Oranim College. In 1965, Levy Vroman moved to New York City with her husband, where she studied at the Dalcroze School of music education through movement and piano teaching according to the Suzuki method.

Levy Vroman was engaged in teaching music, conducting choirs, and organizing festivals at Jewish schools in New York City, including Eshi, East Side Hebrew Institute, Rodeph Shalom, Ramaz, and Kinneret. She also taught at Juilliard School and the School for Strings. Over the years, she composed and wrote numerous children's songs in Hebrew and English for her students. She also taught her songs to teachers and preschool educators during her visits to Israel and participated in workshops during the Ministry of Education's summer courses, where she learned new songs to subsequently share with music teachers in New York City. Throughout her career, she composed songs set to the lyrics of various poets as well as her own—in both Hebrew and English—in addition to creating contemporary classical vocal and instrumental works.

In 1975, the song "Lekha Dodi" was performed by Gabi Sadeh, set to a melody by Levy Vroman, at the Mizrahi (Mideastern Style) Song Festival at the International Convention Center in Jerusalm.

In 1977, the song "Gan Na'ul" was performed by Shimon Hatuka and the singer Alexandra, set to a melody by Levy Vroman, also at the International Convention Center in Jerusalm.

In 1992, Levy Vroman won a prize at a Jewish song competition in Los Angeles for her song "Ve'ahavta" ("And Thou Shall Love"), written in three languages - Hebrew, English, and Ladino - to mark the 500th anniversary of the Expulsion from Spain; the song was performed by Hedva Amrani.

During her years in New York City, Levy Vroman managed various memorial ceremonies for the Israeli Consulate in New York City, including the musical program for the Yitzhak Rabin memorial service held at Madison Square Garden, alongside Consul Colette Avital and Cultural Consul Rafi Gamzo.

For many years, Levy Vroman also directed choir festivals in Jewish schools. Her choirs performed—among other venues—on American television, at City Hall, and at the residence of the Mayor of New York City. Additionally, she directed the musical program for the annual Israeli folk dance festival held in New York City.

Nowadays, Levy Vroman continues her musical work, composing, creating, and recording. Among other things, she produced various memorial ceremonies and the 60th-anniversary celebrations for Ein Hod Artists Village, where she currently resides.

=== A partial list of the places where Levy Vroman Performed: ===
- The U.S. Capitol in Washington – In 1996, the U.S. Congress enacted an anti-terrorism law. To mark the occasion, Levy Vroman was invited to present her song "Ad Matai" (Till When), performed by the singer Shirona Laurie. The song was originally composed following the first bus bombing on Dizengoff Street.
- New York City Hall
- Gracie Mansion (Residence of the Mayor of New York City)
- Brotherhood Synagogue, New York City
- Rodeph Shalom Synagogue, New York City
- Congregation Jeshurun Synagogue, New York City
- Valley Beth Shalom Synagogue, Los Angeles
- Madison Square Garden, New York City
- Gascon Center Theater at Culver City, Los Angeles
- East Side Hebrew Institute, New York City
- Park East Synagogue, New York City
- Marriott Marquis Ballroom, New York City
- New York City Center (where Levy Vroman directed the music for Israeli folk dance festivals)
- Merkin Concert Hall, New York City
- Alice Tully Hall, New York City
- Main events celebrating Israel's Independence Day in New York and at Jewish centers across the United States
- National Arts Club, New York City
- Grand Central Station, New York
- Yehudi Menuhin Memorial Concert Hall, New Orleans
- Givatayim Theater
- Gouda Public Library (in honor of Leo Vroman), The Netherlands
- Vatican Congress Center, Jerusalem
- The film "Collecting Shards" (La'asof Resisim), featuring a soundtrack composed by Levy Vroman, screened at cinemas across Israel
- Gertrude House, Ein Hod Artists Village
- Dada Museum, Ein Hod Artists Village

== Personal Life ==
Hanna Levy Vroman and her husband, Benjamin Levy, a short while after their wedding (1962)

Levy Vroman was married to the painter and sculptor Benjamin Levy, with whom she had four children. For many years, the couple divided their time between Israel and New York, traveling for performances and exhibitions. In 2011, they returned to Israel and settled in Ein Hod Artists Village. Benjamin died in June 2022. Levy Vroman organizes exhibitions and displays of her husband's work in Israel and the U.S.—including at the Knesset (2023), the Dada Museum in Ein Hod Artists Village (2024), the Jewish Museum in New York City (2025), the Amiad Center in Jaffa (2025), and at the Ein Hod Artists Village Gallery (2026)—and established a website for his work. She continues to create and record her own work and travels to the U.S. to visit her children and grandchildren.

== Discography ==
=== Albums and Recordings ===
- "Ve'ahavta" (1992) – a song composed by Levy Vroman based on the well-known text from the Book of Leviticus, "Love thy neighbor as thyself," performed by Hedva Amrani. Written in Hebrew, English, and Ladino to mark the 500th anniversary of the Expulsion from Spain, the song won a prize at a competition for Jewish songs from across the United States held in Los Angeles.
- Eyes (1999) – an album featuring compositions and arrangements for poems by various authors—including Hayim Nahman Bialik, Nathan Zach, and Chayim Topol—as well as songs written by Levy Vroman. Performers include Chayim Topol, Nitzan Ron, Elinoar Moav, and Amal Murkus.
- Let's Build a Bridge Here (2000) – an album of children's songs. The music and lyrics were written by Levy Vroman. The songs grew out of her work in early childhood music education and helped facilitate Hebrew language learning in the United States and English language learning in Israel.
- The Bride and the Brothel (2001) – a musical based on Shalom Asch's play "God of Vengeance". It was staged at the Gascon Center Theater in Culver City, Los Angeles, in 2001, produced by Voices Carry, Inc. The music and lyrics were written in English by Levy Vroman. She also served as the musical producer and performed in the show numerous times.
- Autumn (2003) – Songs in Hebrew and in English. An album dedicated entirely to singer Edna Goren. The songs were composed to lyrics by poets Nathan Zach, Leo Vroman, Amos Ettinger, and others, including lyrics by Levy Vroman herself.
- Encounters with Peace (2009) – A work in a modern style based on texts by the Dutch poet Leo Vroman (Hannah Levy Vroman’s uncle), translated to Hebrew by Amaliya Eyal and set to music by Levy Vroman. The album includes "Peace"—written in the wake of World War II and composed as an oratorio for voices and orchestra—and ten songs Leo Vroman wrote inspired by the work of painter and sculptor Benjamin Levy (Levy Vroman’s husband) for his book *Works on Paper*. Performers: Edna Goren, Dana Mushkatblit, Guy Mannheim, and Ruth Halvani.
- Always in Place (2009) – A collection of contemporary classical instrumental and vocal works performed by cellist Inbal Megiddo, harpist Suzanna Klincharova, flute player Yevgeni Faniuk, harpsichordist Elaine Comparone and her orchestra, and singer Sharla Nafziger.
- In 2010, Levy Vroman recorded an English version of the album "Let's Build a Bridge Here", which she translated together with her daughter, Bat-Sheva. It features performances by Bat-Sheva and Levy Vroman’s grandchildren.

=== Productions, Compositions and Individual Works ===
- Lekha Dodi (1975) – Performed by Gabi Sadeh, set to a melody by Levy Vroman, at the Mizrahi (Mideastern Style) Song Festival at the International Convention Center, Jerusalm.
- Gan Na'ul (1977) – Performed by Shimon HatuKa and the singer Alexandra, set to a melody by Levy Vroman, at the International Convention Center, Jerusalm.
- Ve'ahavta (1992) – A song composed by Levy Vroman based on the well-known text from the Book of Leviticus, "Love thy neighbor as thyself," performed by Hedva Amrani. Written in Hebrew, English, and Ladino to mark the 500th anniversary of the Expulsion from Spain, the song won an award at a competition for Jewish songs from across the United States held in Los Angeles.
- Lakol Zman (There is time for everything) (1995) – A choral piece on the theme of peace, performed by the children's choirs conducted by Levy Vroman at Madison Square Garden to mark the 30th day following the assassination of Yitzhak Rabin.
- Kinah (Lament) – A work for cello and piano in memory of Yitzhak Rabin. Performed by cellist Inbal Megiddo (Levy Vroman's niece) and pianist Ana Grünberg.
- Eretz (Land) – A work for cello and piano. Performed by cellist Inbal Megiddo (Levy Vroman's niece) and pianist Ana Grünberg. Composed to mark the 50th anniversary of the State of Israel.
- HaTfilla LaElef HaBa (Prayer for the Next Millennium) (1999) – Performed by soprano singer Elinoar Moav and a string quartet.
- Holding Up the Sky (2002) – Works for cello, flute, piano, and harp, composed for a ballet performance staged in Los Angeles and produced by Voices Carry, Inc.
- Eating Rocks for Hunger (2004) – Works for piano and violin, composed for a ballet performance staged in Los Angeles and produced by Voices Carry, Inc.
- Ma'aseh HaYetzira VeHaGolem (The Act of Creation and the Golem) – A work for soloists, choir, and piano. A juxtaposition between the creation of man and the creation of the Golem.
- Songs marking the 60th anniversary of the artists' village of Ein Hod, composed specifically for the occasion. The following were performed at the Ein Hod Artists Village Amphitheater:
  - "The Hedgehog from Ein Hod" (2017) – Lyrics and music by Levy Vroman; sung by the children of Ein Hod Artists Village/
  - "Don't Waste your Despair" (2017) – Lyrics by Itche Mambush; music and lyrical arrangement by Levy Vroman; vocals by Gavri Banai and Levy Vroman.
  - "Village Song" (2017) – Lyrics and music by Levy Vroman; sung by the children of Ein Hod Artists Village.
- Levy Vroman composed the soundtrack for the film "Gathering Fragments" (2019)—a film about childhood in Jerusalem during the British Mandate and the Siege of Jerusalem during the War of Independence, created by the Farkash sisters, Ruthie Geva and Liora Kroyanker. Levy Vroman had personally experienced the siege of Jerusalem with her family.
- Levy Vroman composed the song "Gathering Fragments" (based on lyrics by Nurit Yuval, one of the participating members in the film) as a tribute to their parents, honoring their heroism and resilience under the harsh conditions under siege.
- "Gathering Fragments" – In 2021, Levy Vroman recorded an English version of the song "Gathering Fragments," translated in collaboration with her daughter, Bat-Sheva Levy.
- "Another Story" – A composition featuring versions for violin and piano, as well as a version for improv saxophone and piano.
- "Guard Her" (2022) – Lyrics and music by Levy Vroman. Written for the launch of "Life Story" books (which includes Levy Vroman's autobiography) at the Muza Hall, Hof HaCarmel.
- Witness from Hell (2023) - Levy Vroman composed and created the music for the film "Witness from Hell"; A documentary created by Ruth Farkash Geva about 3 survivors in Auschwitz concentration camp
- Nechama Poorta (A crumb of consolation) (2023) – Lyrics and music by Levy Vroman. Written in memory of Barak Amrani, a friend of the couple.
- Kvar Lo Oto Machar (No Longer the Same Tomorrow) (2023) – Lyrics and music by Levy Vroman. Recorded with saxophonist Mosh Keiner and drummer Yehonatan Bar Rashi. The song appears in the video "Carpets of Hope" (Shtichei Tikva) created by Ruti Meyuchas.
- Yamim Shel Chesed (Days of Grace) (2024) – Lyrics and music by Levy Vroman; vocals by Naama Ofir. Written while awaiting the return of the hostages during the Swords of Iron War.
- Lo Notru Milim Befinu (We Are Left Speechless) (2024) – Lyrics and music by Levy Vroman. Written in the wake of the October 7th massacre.
- Bu'ot (Bubbles) (2025) – A song Levy Vroman wrote for her granddaughters. Vocals by the grandchildren of Levy Vroman’s sister, the late Ariela Megido, Ada and Nathan Altomari Megido.
- In 2026, Levy Vroman wrote an English version titled "Bubbles," featuring the same performers as in the Hebrew version.
- Ukshehi Tavo (And When She'll Come) – Lyrics by Yesha'ayahu Ariel; music by Levy Vroman; vocals by Naama Ofir ;Cello Inbal Megiddo; Bansuri flute Tal Coleman.
- Slicha (Forgiveness) – Lyrics and music by Levy Vroman. A children's song for Yom Kippur.
- Le'an Barach HaKadur (Where Did the Ball Run Off To) (2025) – A children's song written and sung by Levy Vroman for her granddaughters. The daughter of Levy Vroman, Bat-Sheva Levy, sang an English version of a song titled "Where Is My Ball."
- Nof Yalduti (My Childhood's Landscape) (2026) – a song written by Levy Vroman over 50 years ago and recorded only in 2026.
- Simla Li V'ruda U'mistovevet (My Pink Twirling Dress) (2026) – lyrics and music by Levy Vroman. The song was inspired by Levy Vroman's granddaughter upon her turning three.
