= Ron Ben-Yishai =

Israeli journalist (born 1943)

- רוֹן בֵּן-יִשַׁי
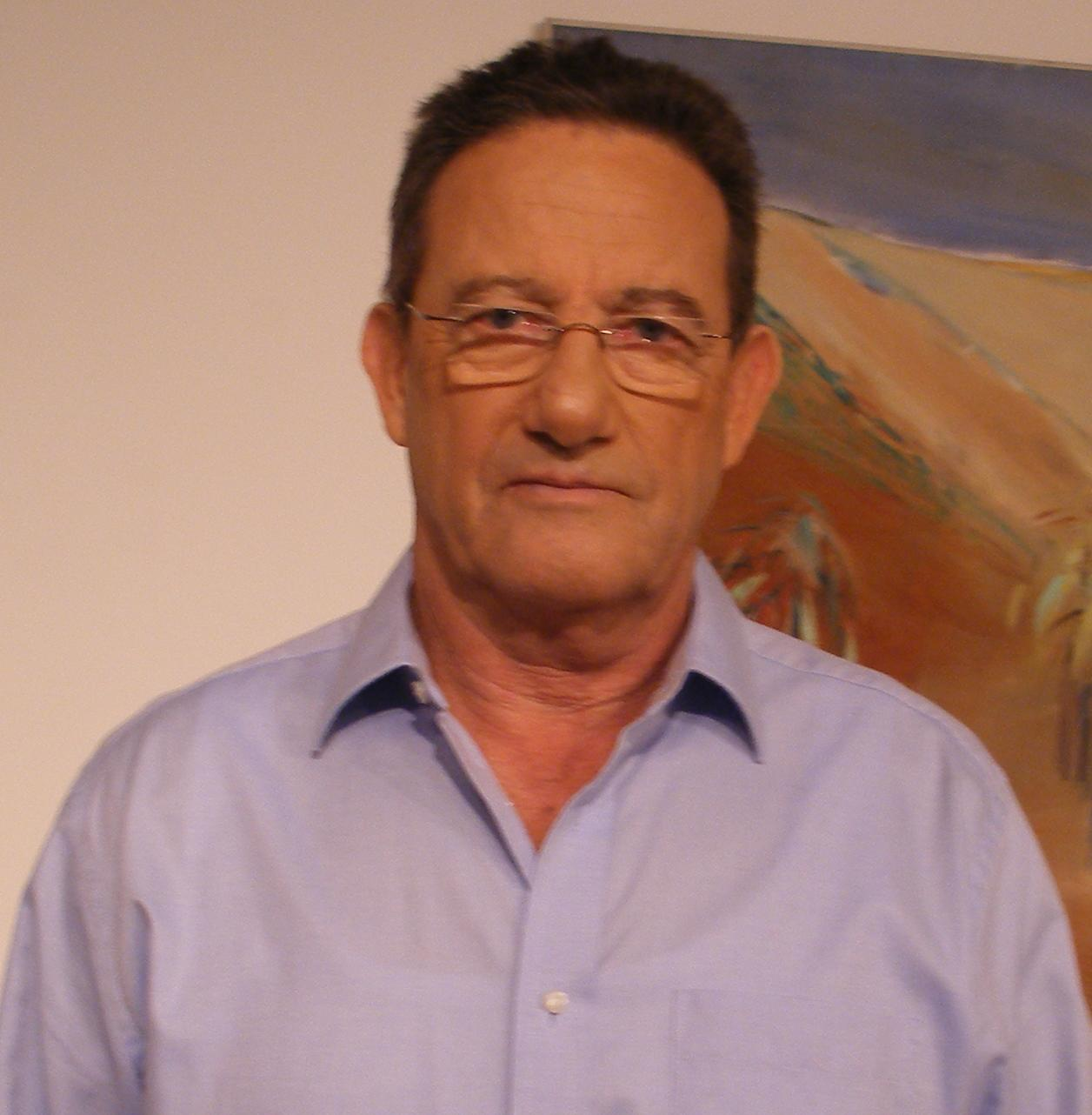
- Ben-Yishai in Givatayim Theater, 2008.
- Born: October 26, 1943 (age 82); Jerusalem, British Mandate of Palestine
- Education: B.A. in economics and geography from the Hebrew University of Jerusalem
- Occupations: Journalist, commentator, lecturer
- Notable credit(s): Israel Army Radio; Channel 1 (Israel); Time; Yedioth Ahronoth
- Children: 3
- Family: Divorced

Ron Ben-Yishai (Hebrew: רוֹן בֵּן-יִשַׁי; born October 26, 1943) is an Israeli journalist. A veteran war correspondent, Ben-Yishai has covered many military conflicts in several different regions. In 2018, he won the Israel Prize, Israel's most prestigious civic honor.

== Biography ==
Ben-Yishai was born in Jerusalem in 1943. He graduated from the military boarding school near the Hebrew Reali School in Haifa in 1961. He joined the Israel Defense Forces (IDF) and served in the Paratroopers Brigade and the Golani Brigade. He finished an infantry officers course and platoon commanders course, in addition to several command courses. He served in paratroopers field units as a reservist. He received a B.A. in economics and geography from the Hebrew University of Jerusalem in 1967.

He covered the Turkish invasion of Cyprus in 1974 and also travelled to Portugal to make a documentary about the Marranos or secret Jews. From 1978 to 1981 he was Yedioth Ahronoth's political correspondent in Washington, D.C. Meanwhile, he was a commentator for ABC. In 1981 he returned to the Israeli Television as a military correspondent. He covered the 1982 Lebanon War. In September, he informed the Israeli Minister of Defense, Ariel Sharon, of "an alleged massacre being committed by the Phalangists in the Sabra and Shatila camps in Beirut". He was the first journalist to enter the camps after the Sabra and Shatila massacre. In 2008, after winning a lifetime achievement award, he named it the most important achievement of his career.

In 1983 he was appointed commander and chief editor of the Israel Army Radio, a position he held until 1985. He covered the Israeli withdrawal from Lebanon. After leaving the Israel Army Radio, he became a commentator and reporter on military affairs for Yedioth Ahronoth, and was a correspondent for Time. He also edited and hosted, with Ram Evron, a talk show called Ze HaZman ("this is the time") on the Israeli Television from 1985 to 1987.

He covered the Soviet–Afghan War and produced a film that was later broadcast on the NBC Nightly News in 1989. In 1989 he covered the drug war in Colombia for Yedioth Ahronoth, Time magazine and Israeli Television. During the Gulf War, he was a military correspondent on the Israeli Channel 2. In 1991 he covered the Kurdish refugees in Turkey and Iraq for Yedioth Ahronoth and Channel 2. In 1992 he covered the First Nagorno-Karabakh War and the War in Yugoslavia. From 1992 to 1993 he was Yedioth Ahronoth's correspondent in Washington. During that time he covered the Israeli–Palestinian peace process. In 1993 he covered northern Iraq. From 1993 to 1994 he edited Reshet Hokeret ("Reshet investigates"), an investigative program on Channel 2. From 1994 to 1996 he reported for Yedioth Ahronoth. From June 1995 to June 1996 he was chief editor of Davar until it was shut down.

In September 1996 he became a military commentator for Yedioth Ahronoth. In 1999 he covered the War in Kosovo, where he was injured.

In 2000 he covered the Second Chechen War.

From 2001 to 2002 he was military commentator for Channel 1. In October 2002 he became a commentator for Globes. In 2002, he was sued by Mordechai Vanunu, who claimed that Ben-Yishai wrote in 1999 that Vanunu gave the Hamas know-how on bomb-making while he was in prison. Ben-Yishai said he was quoting the head of the Shin Bet, Ami Ayalon, and was to enjoy the good faith and truth defenses. The Tel Aviv Magistrate's Court accepted Ben-Yishai's claims and dismissed the case. In 2004 he was appointed spokesman for the President of Israel, Moshe Katsav. He resigned in 2005.

In 2007, after Operation Orchard, he traveled to Syria and visited Damascus. Upon his return, he was questioned by the Israeli police, due to Syria being an "enemy state".

In 2008, he was cast in Israeli filmmaker Ari Folman's animated film Waltz with Bashir, to retell his role in the 1982 Lebanon War.

== Personal life ==
He is divorced with three children and lives in Tel Aviv. He speaks Hebrew, English and German, and partly Arabic and French. He is a lecturer on media and journalism at Tel Aviv University.

== Journalism career ==
In June 1966 he began working as a financial reporter for Kol Yisrael, a position he held until June 1967. During that time he also produced various radio programs. During the War of Attrition he was Kol Yisrael's military correspondent. During that period he was injured while covering an IDF raid on a Fatah camp in Petra, after which he edited Kol Yisrael's current affairs programs. In December 1969 he joined the Israeli Television. In June 1970 he was wounded in an IDF raid in the Golan Heights, after which he became secretary of the Israeli Television's news board. From 1972 to 1976 he also reported for radio and television from Europe. He produced and edited various documentaries. In 1973 he covered the Yom Kippur War. On October 22, he accompanied an Israeli battalion near Ismailia. As he was leaving, the force was heavily bombarded and dozens of soldiers were wounded, including the paramedics. Under fire, he took the paramedics' equipment and attended the wounded. For that, he was awarded the Chief of Staff Citation by the Israeli Chief of Staff, Mordechai Gur, in September 1975.

== Awards and recognition ==
He won the Shani Award for "Best report from the Battlefield" in 1968, the CEO of Israel Broadcasting Authority Award in 1969, the Kinor David Award for Best Documentary in 1978 and Journalist of the year by the Israeli newspaper editors in 1989. In 2008 he was given a lifetime achievement award in the Eilat News Conference, along with Haim Yavin and the late Tommy Lapid.
