= The Lover =

The Lover may refer to:

== Film and television ==
- The Lover (1986 film), an Israeli film based on the A. B. Yehoshua novel (see below)
- The Lover (1992 film), a film based on the Marguerite Duras novel (see below)
- The Lover (2002 film), a Russian film directed by Valery Todorovsky
- The Lover (TV series), a 2015 South Korean television series
- "The Lover" (The Office), a 2009 television episode

== Literature ==
- The Lover (play), a 1962 play by Harold Pinter
- The Lover (Duras novel), a 1984 novel by Marguerite Duras
- The Lover (Kanafani novel), a 1987 collection of three unfinished novels by Ghassan Kanafani
- The Lover (Wilson novel), a 2004 novel by Laura Wilson
- The Lover (Yehoshua novel), a 1977 novel by A. B. Yehoshua

== Music ==
- The Lover (Sibelius) or Rakastava, Op. 14, a 1912 suite by Jean Sibelius

== See also ==
- The Lovers (disambiguation)
- Lover (disambiguation)
