= Zemel =

Zemel is a surname. Notable people with the surname include:

- Eitan Zemel, American academic
- Dvora Bochman (born 1950 as Dvora Rivka Zemel), Israeli artist, painter, and sculptor
- Louis Zemel, plaintiff in Zemel v. Rusk
