= A Late Divorce =

1984 novel by A. B. Yehoshua

- First edition
- Author: A. B. Yehoshua
- Translator: Hillel Halkin
- Language: English
- Subject: Relationships
- Published: 1984, Doubleday
- Media type: print
- Pages: 364
- ISBN: 978-0385155748
- Dewey Decimal: 892.4/36
- LC Class: PJ5054.Y42 G413

A Late Divorce is a novel written by A. B. Yehoshua, originally published in Hebrew.

== Synopsis ==
Five years after being attacked at knifepoint by his wife, Yehuda Kaminka returns to Israel from the United States in order to divorce her. The novel follows the lives of individuals in the Kaminka family, including Naomi (Yehuda's institutionalized wife), and the couple's adult children (Tsvi, Asa, and Ya'el), among others. Each of the children's lives is fraught with peril: Asa, a university lecturer in Jerusalem, is caught in a sexless marriage with the aspiring writer Dina, Tsvi spends his days in Tel Aviv lamenting over his relationship with his father and using his middle-aged homosexual lover, and Ya'el, the couple's daughter, is married to a widely disliked lawyer. The novel, like Yehoshua's debut novel The Lover, is told from a first-person point of view, with each chapter from the view of a different character, and explores themes of unfulfilled romance, Jewish diaspora, social crises, and generational estrangement.
