= Lover =

Lover or lovers may refer to a person having a sexual or romantic relationship with someone outside marriage. In this context see:

- Sexual partner
- Mistress
- Premarital sex
- Extramarital sex

Lover or Lovers may also refer to:

== Geography ==
- Lover, Wiltshire, England
- Lover, Pennsylvania, US
- Lover, frazione of the comune of Campodenno, Trentino, Trentino-Alto Adige/Südtirol, Italy
- Lővér, the Hungarian name for Luieriu village, Suseni Commune, Mureș County, Romania

== People ==
- Ed Lover or James Roberts (born 1963), American rapper, actor, musician and radio personality
- Eddy Lover or Eduardo Mosquera (born 1985), Panamanian singer-songwriter
- Latin Lover (wrestler) or Victor Manuel Resendiz Ruiz (born 1967), Mexican professional wrestler and actor
- Samuel Lover (1797–1868), Anglo-Irish songwriter, novelist and portraitist
- Seth Lover (1910–1997), American inventor of the humbucker
- Vector Lovers or Martin Wheeler, British musician

== Film and television ==
- Lover (2024 film), an Indian Tamil-language romantic drama film
- Lover (2018 film), an Indian Telugu-language film
- Lover (2022 film), an Indian Punjabi-language film
- Lovers (1927 film), an American silent film
- Lovers (1983 film), an Indian Hindi film by Bharathiraja
- Lovers (1991 film), a Spanish film noir
- Lovers (1999 film), a French film directed by Jean-Marc Barr
- Lovers (2013 film), or Another Life, a French film directed by Emmanuel Mouret
- Lovers (2014 film), an Indian Telugu-language romantic comedy film
- Lovers (2020 film), a French film directed by Nicole Garcia
- Lovers (South Korean TV series), a 2006 South Korean TV series
- Lovers (Iranian TV series), a 2018 Iranian romance drama TV series
- "Lovers", a 1994 episode of the British sitcom Men Behaving Badly

== Literature ==
- Lover (novel), by Bertha Harris, 1976
- Lovers (play), by Brian Friel, 1967
- Lovers (comic book)

== Music ==
=== Artists ===
- Lovers (band), electropop trio from Portland, Oregon

=== Albums ===
- Lover (album) or its title song (see below) by Taylor Swift, 2019
- Lover or the title song, by George Maple, 2017
- Lover, by Morris Albert, 1999
- Lover, by Noah Gundersen, 2019
- Lovers (Babyface album) or the title song, 1986
- Lovers (Cannonball Adderley album) or the title song, 1975
- Lovers (David Murray album) or the title song, 1988
- Lovers (Dufresne album), 2008
- Lovers (Hanna Pakarinen album) or the title song, 2007
- Lovers (Mickey Newbury album) or the title song, 1975
- Lovers (Nels Cline album), 2016
- Lovers (The Sleepy Jackson album), 2003
- Lovers or the title song, by Anna of the North, 2017
- Lovers, by The Royalty, 2012

=== Songs ===
- "Lover" (Rodgers and Hart song), 1932
- "Lover" (Taylor Swift song), 2019
- "Lover", by AAA from AAA 10th Anniversary Best, 2015
- "Lover", by Alter Bridge from Fortress, 2013
- "Lover", by Digital Remedy, an Australian number-one club track of 2019
- "Lover", by G Flip from About Us, 2019
- "Lover", by Hyunjin from SKZ-Replay 2026 Pt.1, 2026
- "Lover", by Pnau from Pnau, 2007
- "Lover", by Rachel McFarlane, 1998
- "Lover", by Sophie Ellis-Bextor from Read My Lips, 2001
- "Lovers" (song), by the Tears, 2005
- "Lovers (Live a Little Longer)", by Abba, 1979
- "Lovers", by Deftones, the B-side of "Hexagram", 2003
- "Lovers", by Natalie Cole from Thankful, 1977
- "Lovers", from the film House of Flying Daggers, 2004
- "Lover", by the Michael Stanley Band from Heartland, 1980

== Other uses ==
- Lover (clothing), a fashion label
- Lovers (stock characters) or Innamorati, in the commedia dell'arte theatre of 16th-century Italy
- Lovers rock, a style of reggae music

== See also ==
- The Lover (disambiguation)
- The Lovers (disambiguation)
