= Givatayim =

Givatayim גבעתיים
- City

Hebrew transcription(s)
  - Also spelled: Giv'atayim
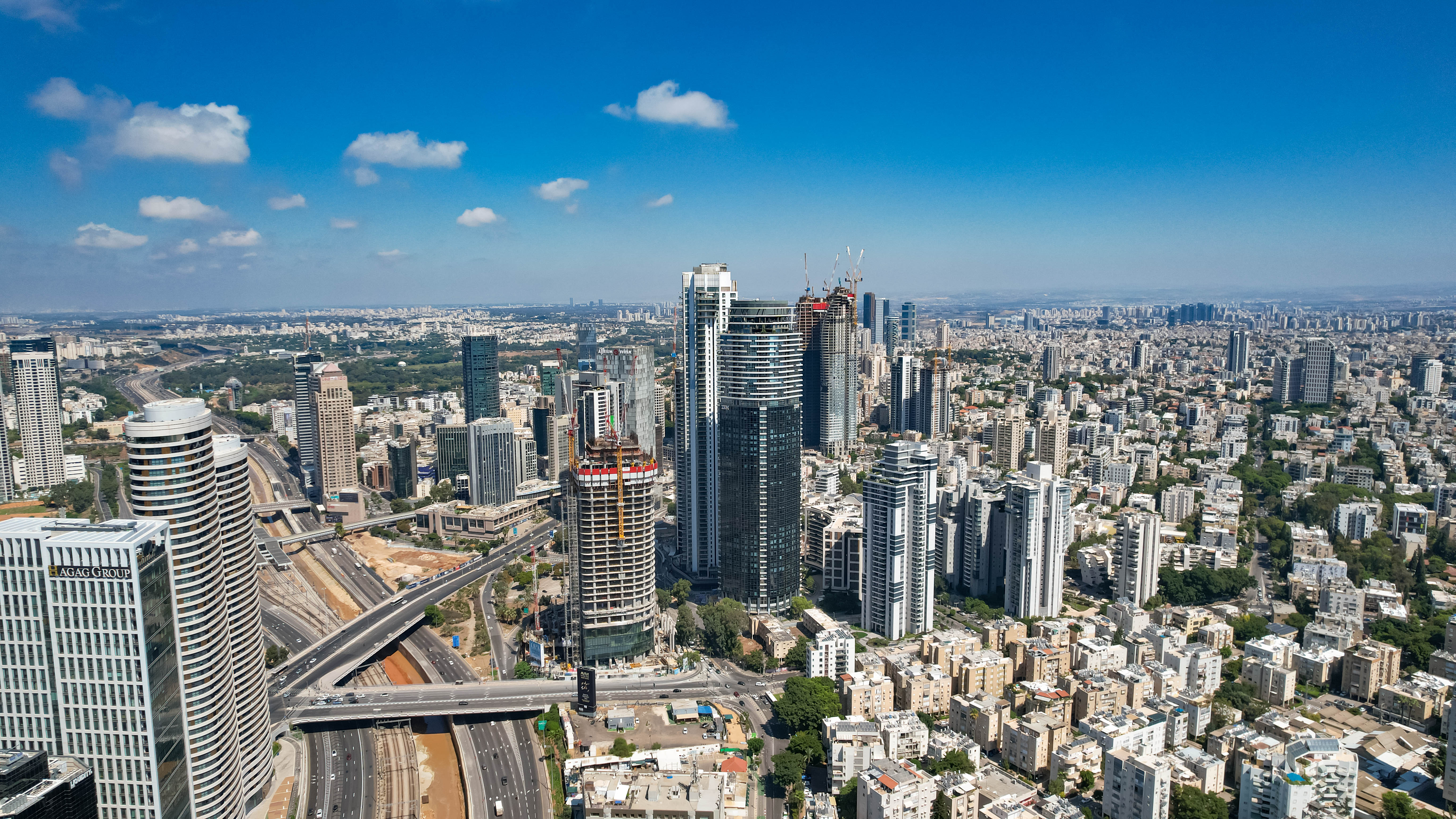
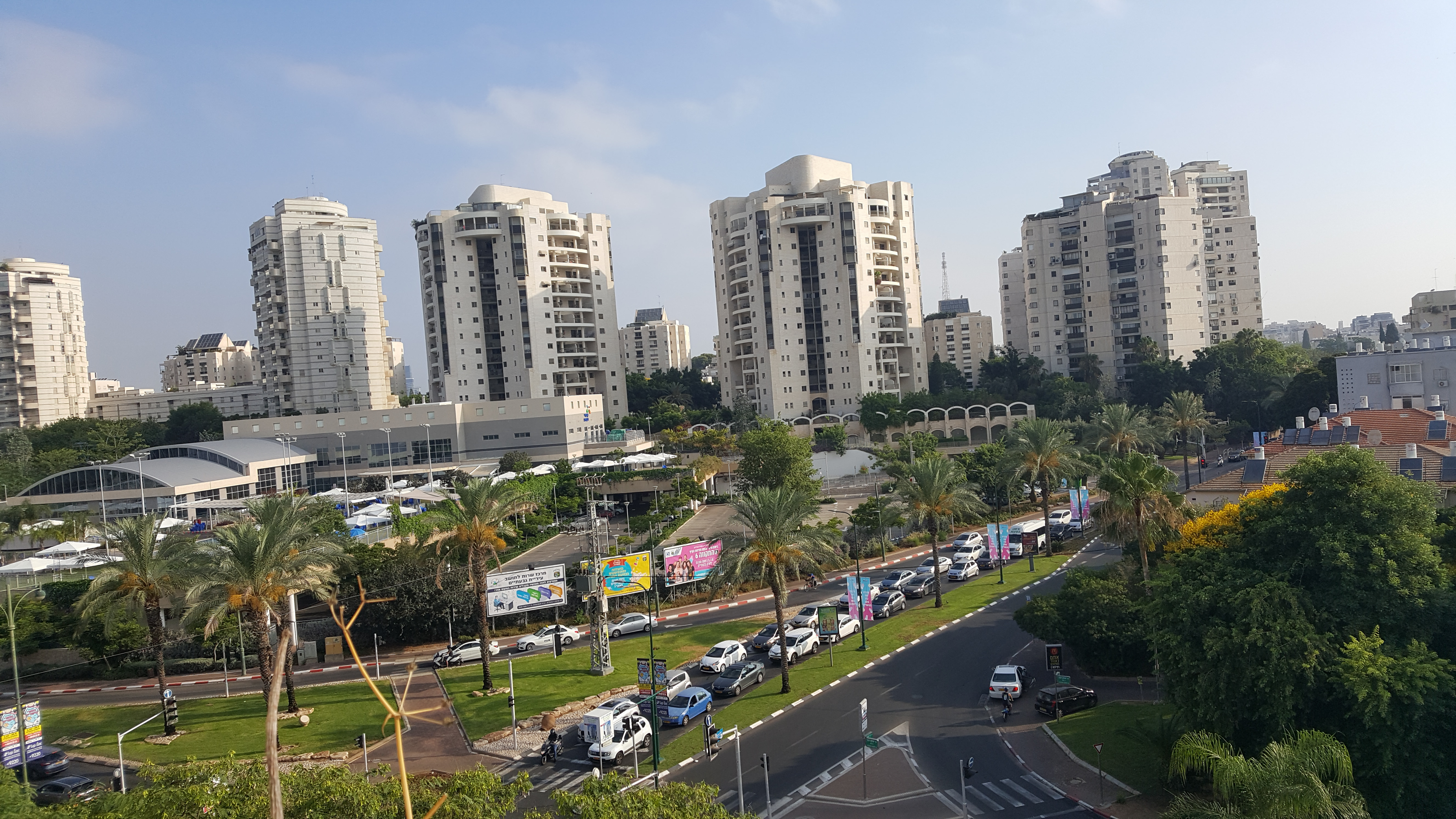
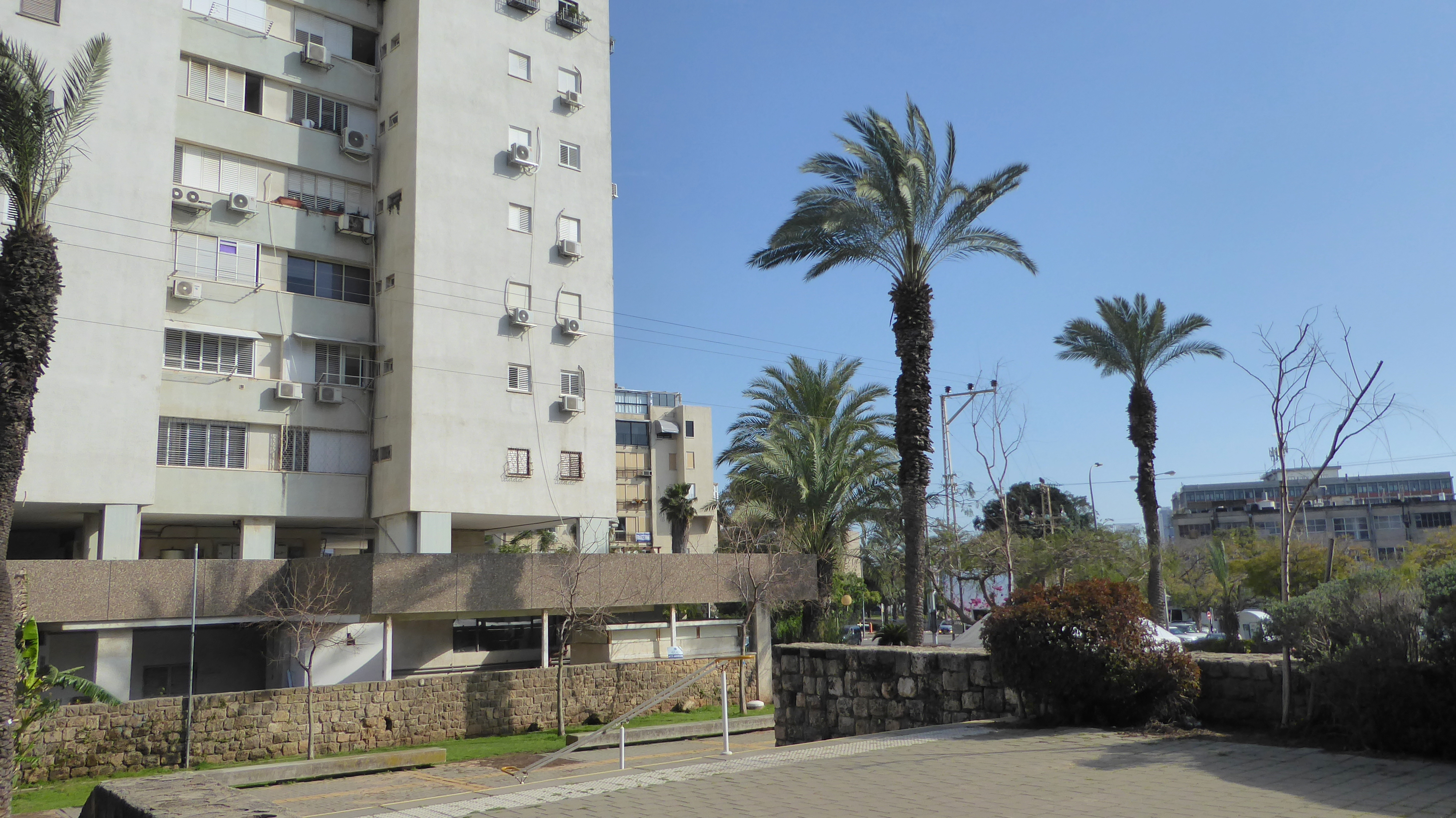
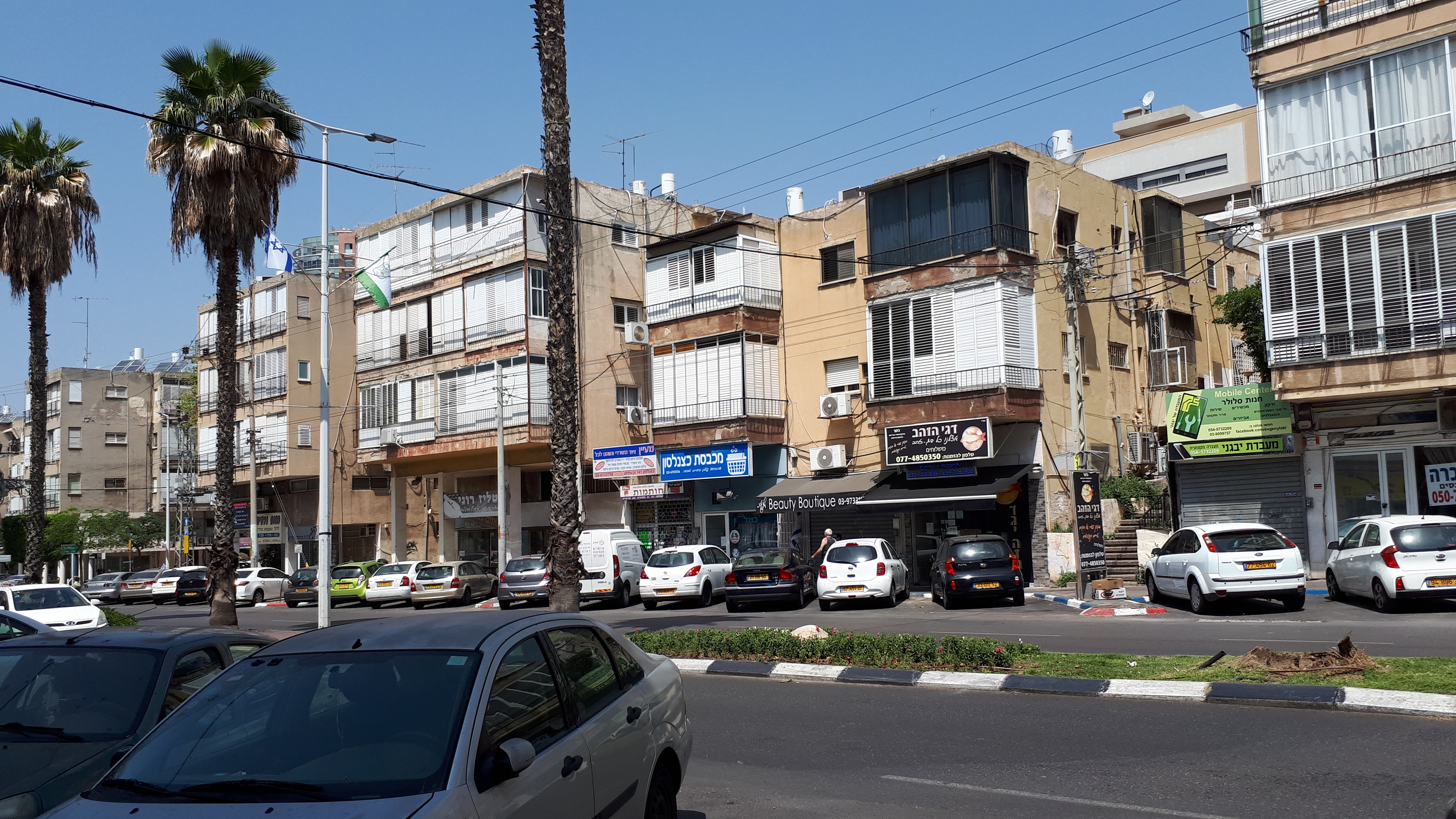
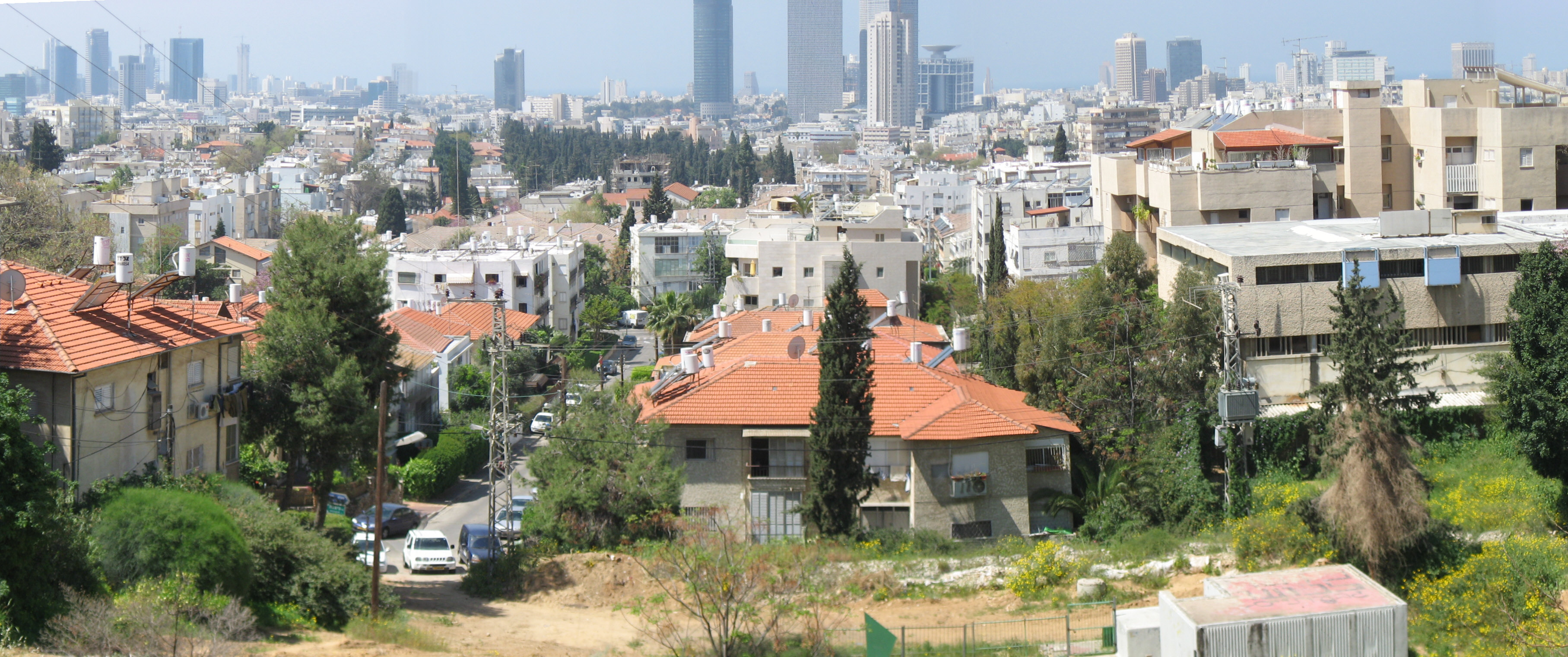

- Flag Coat of arms

- Location within Central Israel Location within Israel
- Coordinates: 32°04′17″N 34°48′36″E
- Country: Israel
- District: Tel Aviv
- Natural Region: Ramat Gan
- Founded: 1922
- City status: 1959

Government
  - Type: Mayor–council
  - Body: Municipality of Givatayim
  - Mayor: Ran Kunik

Area
  - Total: 3,211 dunams (3.211 km^{2}; 1.240 sq mi)

Population (2024)
  - Total: 58,601
  - Density: 18,250/km^{2} (47,270/sq mi)

Ethnicity
  - Jews and others: 99.9%
  - Arabs: 0.1%
- Time zone: UTC+2 (IST)
  - Summer (DST): UTC+3 (IDT)
- Name meaning: Two hills
- Website: givatayim.muni.il

Givatayim (Hebrew: גבעתיים, lit. 'Two hills') is a city in Israel east of Tel Aviv. It is part of the Gush Dan metropolitan area. Givatayim was established in 1922 by pioneers of the Second Aliyah. In 2024 it had a population of 58,601.

The name of the city comes from the "two hills" on which it was established: Borochov Hill and Kozlovsky Hill. Kozlovsky is the highest hill in the Gush Dan region at 85 metres (279 ft) above sea level. The city was expanded in the 1930s so that today it is actually situated on 4 hills, Borochov, Kozlovsky, the Poalei HaRakevet ("railroad workers"), and Rambam Hill.

Historical population
Year	Pop.	±%
1948	9,600	—
1955	19,800	+106.2%
1961	30,900	+56.1%
1972	48,600	+57.3%
1983	46,700	−3.9%
1995	49,000	+4.9%
2008	52,100	+6.3%
2010	54,000	+3.6%
2016	58,508	+8.3%
2022	58,052	−0.8%
2024	58,600	+0.9%

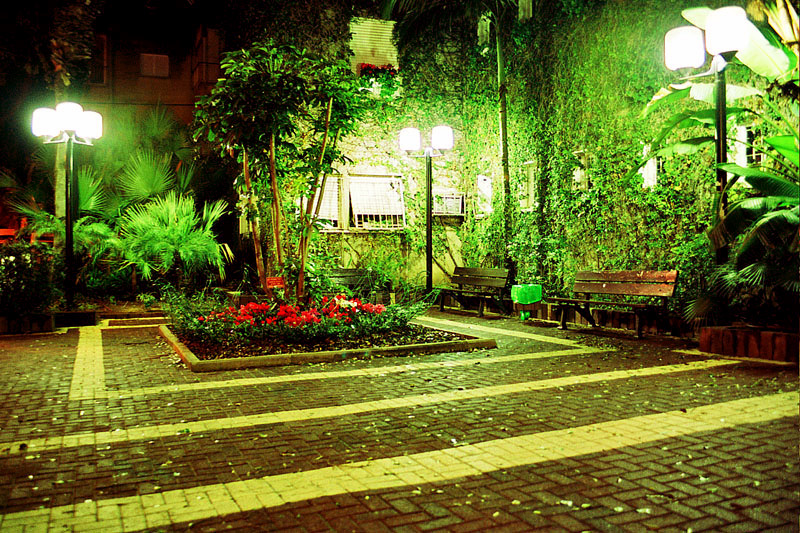
Givatayim by night

== History ==
=== Antiquity ===
Archaeological remains of a Chalcolithic settlement have been found at the site of what is now Givatayim.

=== British Mandate era ===
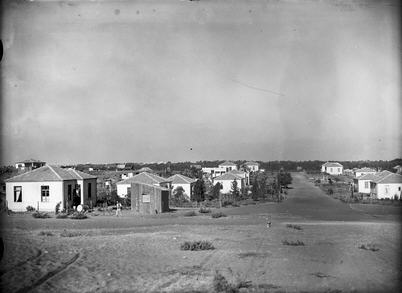
Borochov Neighbourhood (Shechunat Borochov) in 1926, photo by Samuel Joseph Schweig

The modern town was founded on April 2, 1922 by a group of 22 Second Aliyah pioneers led by David Schneiderman. The group purchased 300 dunams (300,000 square metres (3,200,000 sq ft)) of land on the outskirts of Tel Aviv that became the Borochov Neighbourhood (Shechunat/Shekhunat Borochov), the first workers' neighbourhood in the country. It was named for Dov Ber Borochov, founder of the Poalei Zion workers' party. Later, another 70 families joined the group, receiving smaller plots. The land was purchased with their private savings, but was voluntarily transferred to the Jewish National Fund, which organized Jewish settlement at the time, in keeping with the pioneers' socialist beliefs.

Shechunat Borochov is credited for a number of innovations in the early Jewish settlement movement, including establishing the first cooperative grocery store (Tzarkhaniya, "Consumer") that still functioned in the same location into the 1980s.

Shechunat Rambam was another neighborhood in what is today known as Givatayim. Rambam used to be more "bourgeois" in the eyes of Borochov's founders, who were considered socialists. Thus, the two neighborhoods used to function differently from an economic viewpoint.

Over time, more neighborhoods developed: Sheinkin (1936; named after Menahem Sheinkin), Givat Rambam (1933; named after Maimonides), Kiryat Yosef (1934; named after the biblical figure), and Arlozorov (1936; named after Haim Arlosoroff).

All these neighborhoods were merged to form a local council in August 1942.

=== State of Israel ===
Givatayim was declared a city in 1959.

== Education and culture ==
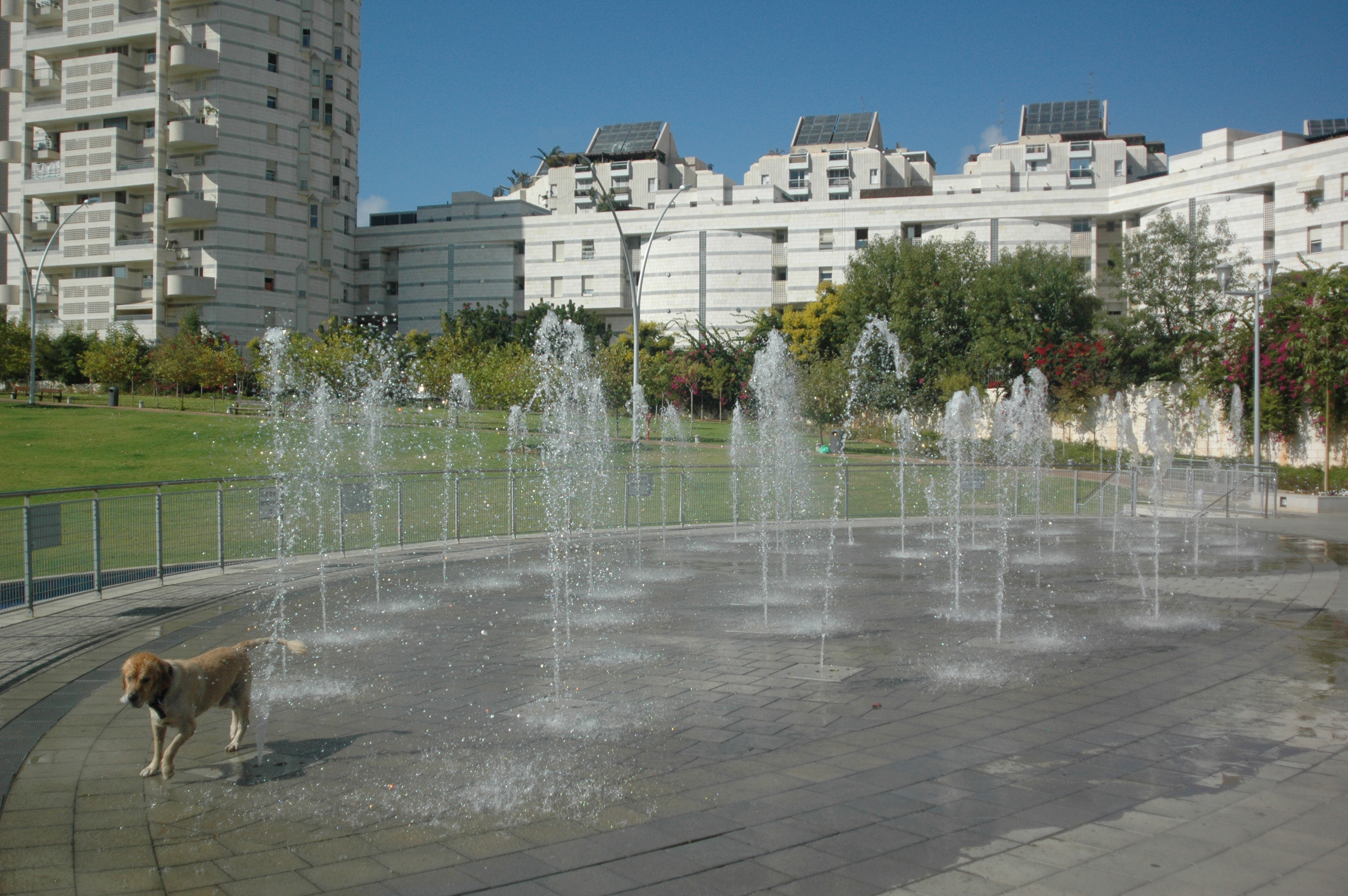
Givatayim park

Givatayim has 41 kindergartens, 9 elementary schools and 4 high schools. As of 2018, the city has one of the highest rate of secondary school matriculation in the country. Mayor Reuven Ben-Shachar initiated a special high school exam assistance program that after 3 years resulted in an 11% increase of high school test results in 2010.

Thelma Yellin High School for the Arts alumni include Mili Avital, Maya Dunietz, Shira Haas, Dikla Hadar, Ohad Knoller, Ziv Koren, Shai Maestro, Ido and Tal Mosseri, Rachel Szor, Yael Tal, Michal Yannai, and Ilanit.

== Urban development ==
Eurocom Tower is a 70-story skyscraper consisting of four apartment towers and a 50-story office building. A large square connects to surrounding areas with bridges and underground passes. The complex is near Ramat Gan and its Diamond Exchange District.

In addition to Eurocom Tower, other high-rise projects are planned for the city. According to former Givatayim mayor Reuven Ben-Shahar, the municipality's policy is to promote high-rise construction on the city's outer edges, while preserving the fabric of residential neighborhoods deeper within the city, including the city center. Current plans for the northwest of the city envision high-rise towers along Katznelson and Aliyat Hanoar Streets near the boundaries of Tel Aviv and Ramat Gan. As part of the redevelopment, Katznelson Street will be colonnaded along its length and a 2-meter-wide cycle paths are planned for both sides of the road, with one lane for buses and another for cars.

== Mayors ==
- Shimon Ben-Zvi (1941–1965)
- Kuba Kraizman (1965–1978)
- Yitzhak Yaron (1978–1993)
- Efi (Ephraim) Stenzler (1993–2006)
- Iris Avram, replaced the previous mayor due to his early resignation after he became the chairman of KKL - the Jewish National Fund (2006–2007)
- Reuven Ben-Shahar (2007–2013)
- Ran Kunik (2013–present)

Reuven Ben-Shahar was the first candidate from Kadima that won a city election and the first mayor in Givatayim that was not from the Israeli Labor Party.

== Voting Patterns ==
In the 2022 election, 75 percent of voters in Givatayim voted for the parties of the center-left coalition led by Yair Lapid, while 22 percent voted for the parties of the right-wing coalition led by Benjamin Netanyahu and 0.7 percent voted for the Arab parties.

In the 2026 election, 78 percent of voters in Givatayim voted for the parties of the center-left coalition led by Gadi Eisenkot, while 17 percent voted for the parties of the right-wing coalition led by Benjamin Netanyahu and 0.6 percent voted for the Arab parties. An additional 2.7 percent voted for the Reservists, and 1.6 percent voted for Amcha Yisrael. Voter turnout increased 11 percent from the 2022 election.

== Notable people ==
- Avi Belleli (born 1963), singer
- Dvora Bochman (born 1950), artist
- Izhar Cohen (born 1951), singer, Eurovision song contest winner
- Tal Erel (born 1996), Israel National Baseball Team player
- Oded Kattash (born 1974), basketball player and coach
- Maxim Katz (born 1984), politician and YouTuber
- Adir Miller (born 1974), actor, screenwriter and comedian
- Sjaron Minailo (born 1979), opera director
- Oren Moverman (born 1966), filmmaker
- Igal Naor (born 1958), actor
- Tzipora Obziler (born 1973), tennis player
- Mickey Rosenthal (born 1955), Labor Party Member of the Knesset
- Yuval Semo (born 1969), actor and comedian
- A. B. Yehoshua (1936–2022), novelist and public intellectual

== Twin towns and sister cities ==
Givatayim is twinned with:

- Chattanooga, United States
- Esslingen (district), Germany
- Harbin, China
- Mulhouse, France
- Oradea, Romania
- Sfântu Gheorghe, Romania
- Vác, Hungary

== See also ==
- HaShahar Tower
