= Madonna of the Cat (Romano) =

1522–1523 painting by Giulio Romano

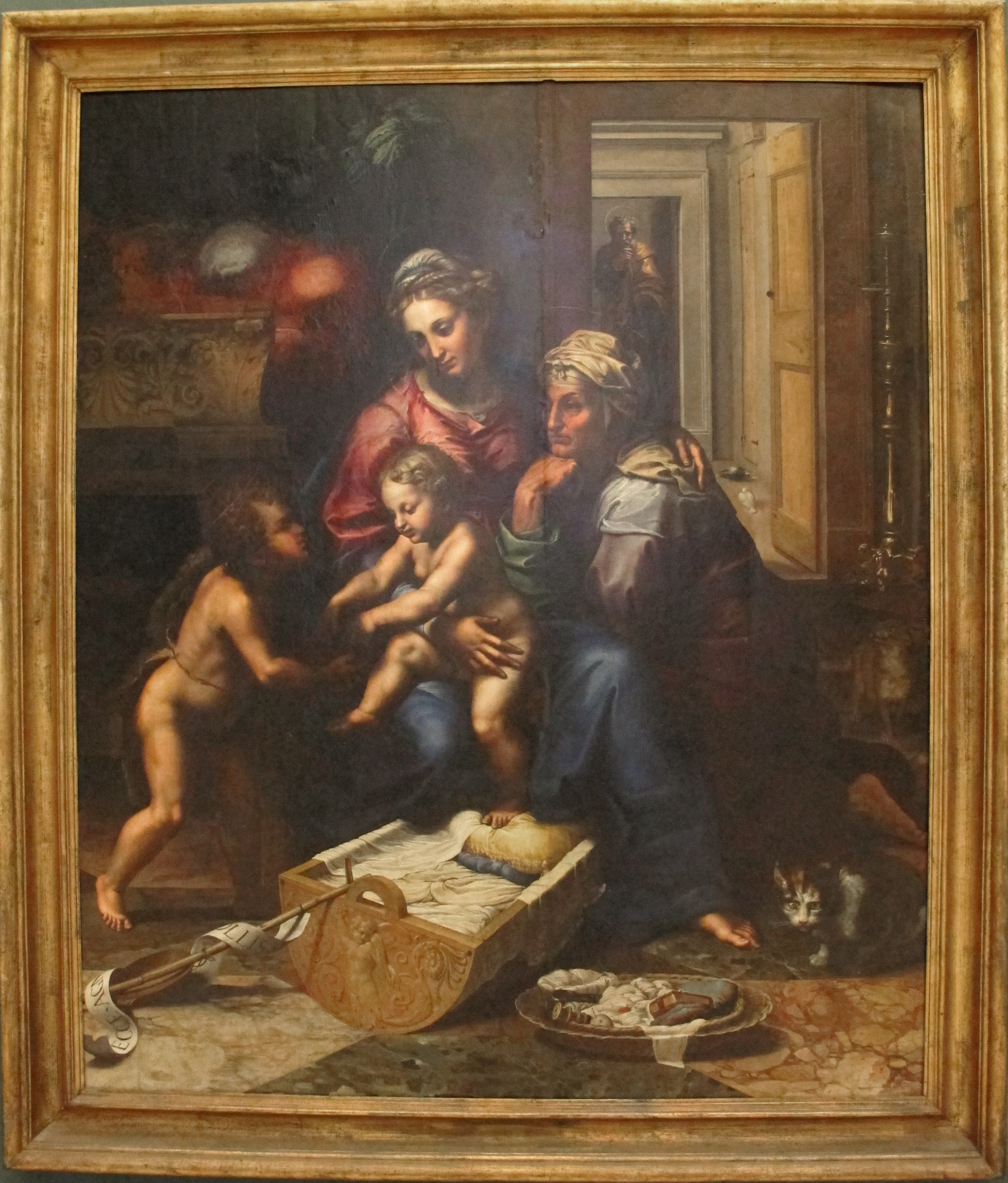
- Artist: Giulio Romano
- Year: 1522-23
- Medium: oil on wood
- Dimensions: 172 cm × 144 cm (68 in × 57 in)
- Location: National Museum of Capodimonte, Naples

Madonna of the Cat is a 1522-1523 oil on wood painting by Giulio Romano, now in the National Museum of Capodimonte in Naples.

It draws on the pyramidical compositions of Leonardo da Vinci and Raphael and takes its name from the domestic cat in the foreground, which allows it to be identified with a work known as "il quadro della gatta" (the painting of or with the cat) by Vasari, who saw it in Mantua in 1566. The same cat recurs in the artist's 1524-1525 The Lovers.

The work was probably produced for Federico Gonzaga while the artist was still in Rome and thus formed part of the Gonzaga collection for a time. In the late 16th century it is recorded in the collection of Barbara Sanseverino, a noblewoman from Parma and lover and confidant of Vincenzo I Gonzaga. The Farnese family confiscated artworks from several local nobles and thus the work entered the Farnese collection from Sanseverino's collection in 1612. It was one of the works inherited by Charles of Bourbon around 1737 and was then moved to Naples, where it remains.

== Bibliography ==
- (in Italian) Stefania Pasti, 'Giulio Romano e la Madonna della gatta: uno studio iconografico' in Storia dell'Arte n.31, 2012
