= Givatayim Theater =

Coordinates: 32°4′2.03″N 34°48′14.82″E

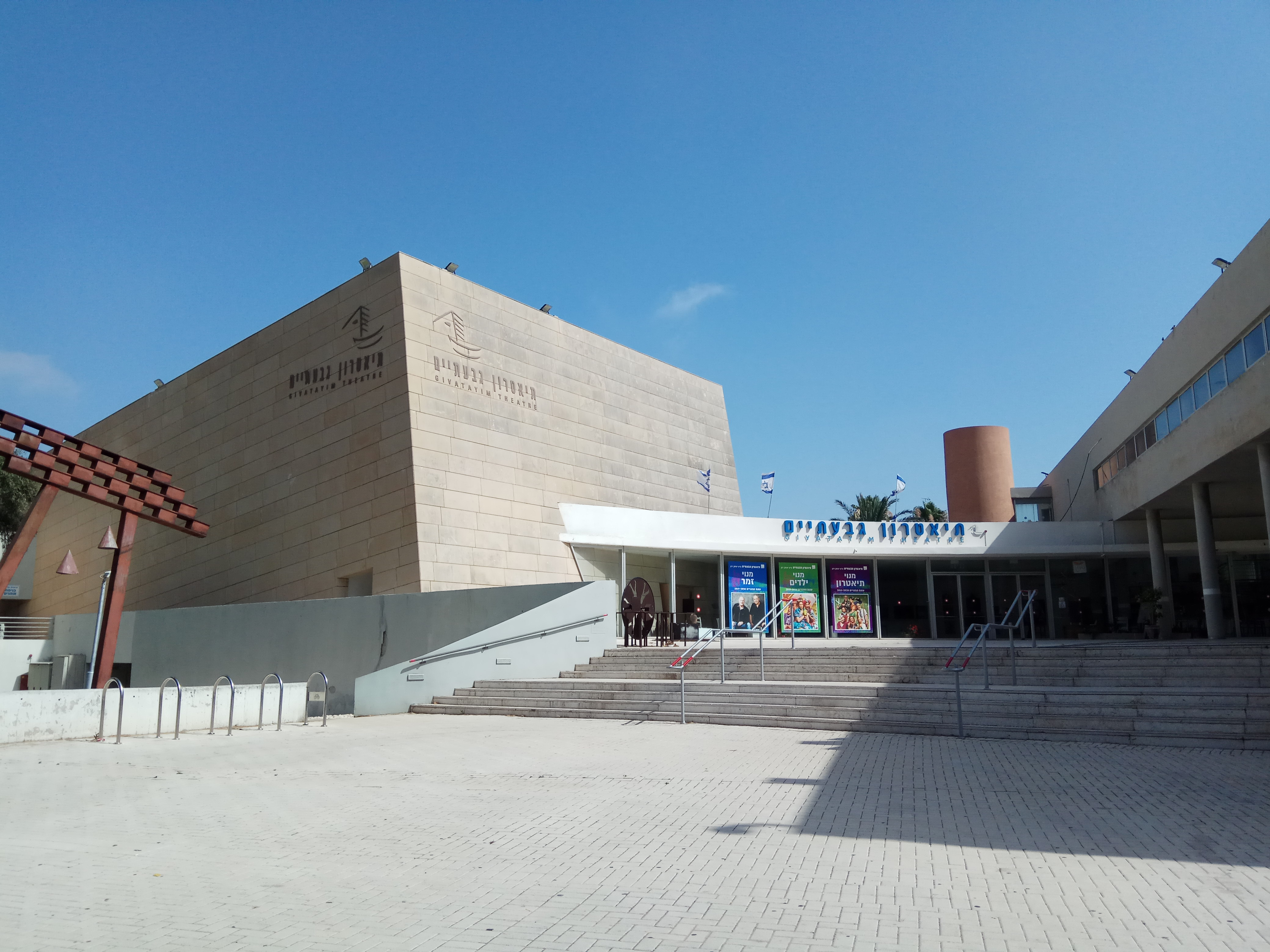
Givatayim Theater

Givatayim Theater is a theater and center for the arts in Givatayim, Israel.

== History ==
In 1996, the deconstructivist building designed by architects Bracha Chayutin and Michael Chayutin won the Israeli Rechter Prize for architecture. The building was built by Givatayim Municipality via target corporation, the Municipal Economic Company. At first it was called Communal Culture Center, as it was to be its purpose, then Beit Esslingen after the rooms on the top floor served as a hostel for a youth delegation from Esslingen, Germany, who had contributed to the construction of the building by donating money. On 23 July 1998, the building was officially renamed Givatayim Theater.

At the beginning of 2014, David Kigler was appointed substitute director of the theater, after the theater had fallen into debt of 1.5 million shekels. Public and political criticism arose due to the fact that Kigler held the seventh place under the mayor Ran Kunik's political party "Our Givatayim".

The theater is named in honor of Yitzhak Yaron.

The theater has a large central hall, a smaller space named for Arbelli Almozalino (which also displays dolls from her collection) and a theater club. The theater also has a cafe, a guesthouse and a sculpture garden. A storytellers festival takes place there on an annual basis.
