= The Lovers (Daen) =

Public art work by Lindsay Daen

Coordinates: 43°10′31.0″N 87°56′10.5″W

- Artist: Lindsay Daen
- Year: 1964
- Type: bronze
- Location: Lynden Sculpture Garden; Milwaukee, Wisconsin
- Owner: Bradley Family Foundation

The Lovers is a public art work by artist Lindsay Daen located at the Lynden Sculpture Garden near Milwaukee, Wisconsin. The sculpture depicts two elongated figures walking hand in hand; it is installed on the lawn.
