= The Lovers (Giulio Romano) =

Painting by Giulio Romano

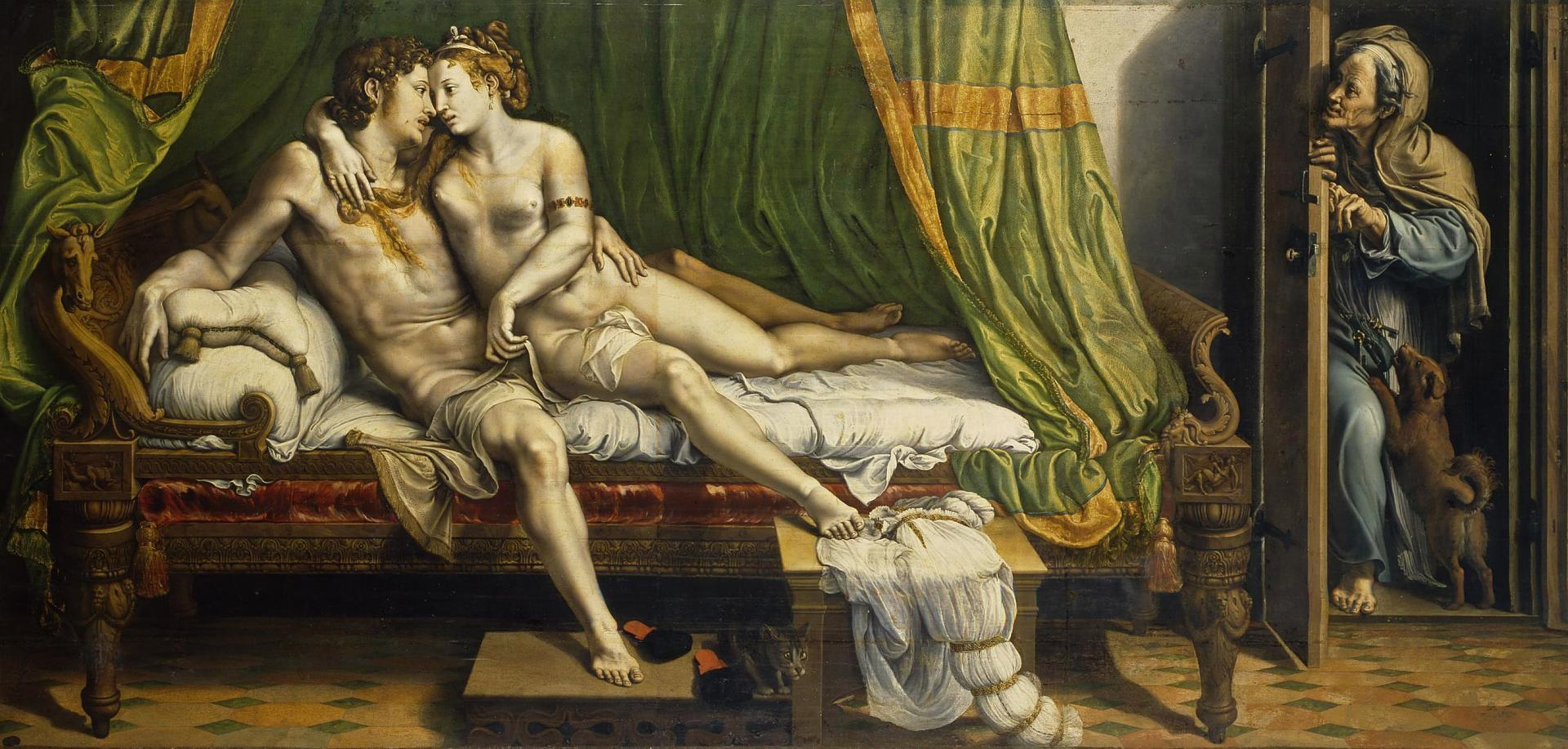
The Lovers (1524–1525) by Giulio Romano

The Lovers, Two Lovers or Love Scene is an oil painting by Giulio Romano, painted in 1524–1525 on panel and later transferred to canvas by A Mitrokin in 1834. Since it was poorly stored and kept off public display because of its subject matter until 1920, it has significant damage, including three large breaks in the canvas sealed with coarse plasters on the reverse and other damage to the paint and varnish layer both before and after the transfer It is now in the Hermitage Museum.

Its title is tentative and it has also been known by several others:

- 1773 Hermitage catalogue - "Gallant Scene"
- EK Lipgart - "Scene from Boccaccio"
- during a restoration between 1800 and 1850 - "Mars and Venus"
- 1958 Hermitage catalogue - "Alexander and Roxane"
- Neverov - "Zeus and Alcimene"
- Hart - "Maid Warning an Unfaithful Wife of her Husband's Return"
- Thornton - "Courtesan Receiving a Client"

The work was produced in 1524–1525 at an unknown location, since the artist left Rome in 1524 and arrived in Mantua the following year, where he was mainly occupied with major commissions. It may have been commissioned by Federico Gonzaga and seems to have been painted just before the artist left Rome for Mantua. It shows a naked man and woman embracing on a bed decorated with two small erotic bas-reliefs of satyrs having sex with a goat and a woman respectively. Under the bed is a cat which also appears in his Madonna and Child with Cat (Capodimonte Museum), produced in 1522–1523 in Rome. An elderly female servant watches from a doorway to the right.

A painting on this subject by Romano is mentioned by Vasari as being owned by Vespasiano I Gonzaga. On publishing Vasari's evidence in 1880, Milanese identified this with a version then in the Berlin Museum with the figures in the middle-ground rather than the foreground, since he was then unable to see the Hermitage version, still off public display "due to the indecency of its subject". On first being exhibited to the public in 1920 at the First Hermitage Exhibition, the catalogue instead identified the Hermitage work as the original and the Berlin one as a copy. That Berlin version was moved to the Sanssouci Palace in 1930 and recorded in Schloss Reinsberg in 1942, but presumed lost later in the Second World War.

Johann Friedrich Reiffenstein bought the work from Thomas Jenkins in London for Catherine the Great. In a letter to Thomas Pitt dated 8 September 1780, Gavin Hamilton reported that Jenkins had sold Catherine many works but that "the Giulio Romano [i.e. The Lovers] is, I think, the best in the collection".
