= A. B. Yehoshua =

Israeli novelist, essayist, and playwright (1936–2022)

- אברהם ב. יהושע
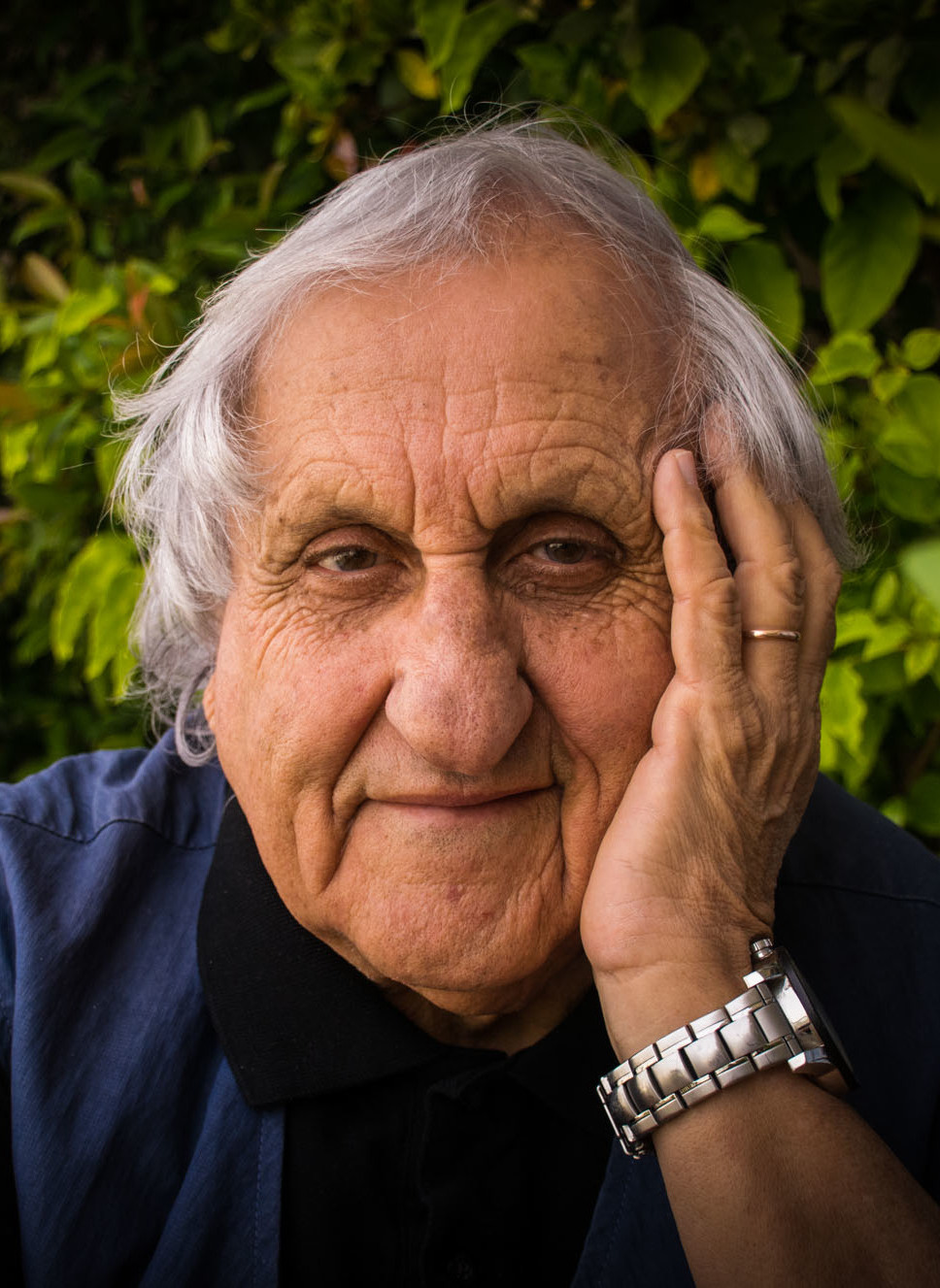
- Yehoshua in 2017
- Born: Avraham Gabriel Yehoshua; December 9, 1936; Jerusalem, Mandatory Palestine
- Died: June 14, 2022 (aged 85); Tel Aviv, Israel
- Education: Hebrew University of Jerusalem (BA, 1961); Teachers College (1962); Sorbonne (MA, French Literature)
- Occupations: Novelist; essayist; short story writer; playwright
- Spouse: Rivka Kirsninski (m. 1960; died 2016)
- Writing career
- Notable works: Mr. Mani (1990); The Lover (1977); "Facing the Forest"
- Notable awards: ACUM Prize; 1961; National Jewish Book Award; 1990, 1993; Israel Prize for Literature; 1995; Los Angeles Times Book Prize; 2006 A Woman in Jerusalem
- Movement: Israeli "New Wave"
- Yehoshua's voice recorded April 2017

Avraham Gabriel "Boolie" Yehoshua (Hebrew: אברהם גבריאל "בולי" יהושע; December 9, 1936 – June 14, 2022) was an Israeli novelist, essayist, and playwright. The New York Times called him the "Israeli Faulkner". Underlying themes in Yehoshua's work are Jewish identity, the tense relations with non-Jews, the conflict between the older and younger generations, and the clash between religion and politics.

== Biography ==
Avraham Gabriel ("Boolie") Yehoshua was born to a third-generation Jerusalem family of Sephardi origin from Salonika, Greece. His father Yaakov Yehoshua, the son and grandson of rabbis, was a scholar and author specializing in the history of Jerusalem. His mother, Malka Rosilio, was born and raised in Mogador, French Morocco, and emigrated to Jerusalem with her parents in 1932. Avraham grew up in Jerusalem's Kerem Avraham neighbourhood.

He attended Gymnasia Rehavia municipal high school in Jerusalem. As a youth, Yehoshua was active in the Hebrew Scouts. After completing his studies, Yehoshua was drafted to the Israeli army, where he served as a paratrooper from 1954 to 1957, and participated in the 1956 Sinai War. After studying literature and philosophy at the Hebrew University of Jerusalem, he began teaching. He lived in Jerusalem's Neve Sha'anan neighborhood.

From 1963 to 1967, Yehoshua lived and taught in Paris and served as the General Secretary of the World Union of Jewish Students. From 1972, he taught Comparative and Hebrew Literature at the University of Haifa, where he held the rank of Full Professor. In 1975 he was a writer-in-residence at St Cross College, Oxford. He has also been a visiting professor at Harvard (1977), the University of Chicago (1988, 1997, 2000); and Princeton (1992).

Yehoshua was married to Rivka, a clinical psychologist and psychoanalyst, until her death in 2016. He died of esophageal cancer, on June 14, 2022, in Tel Aviv Sourasky Medical Center.

== Literary career ==
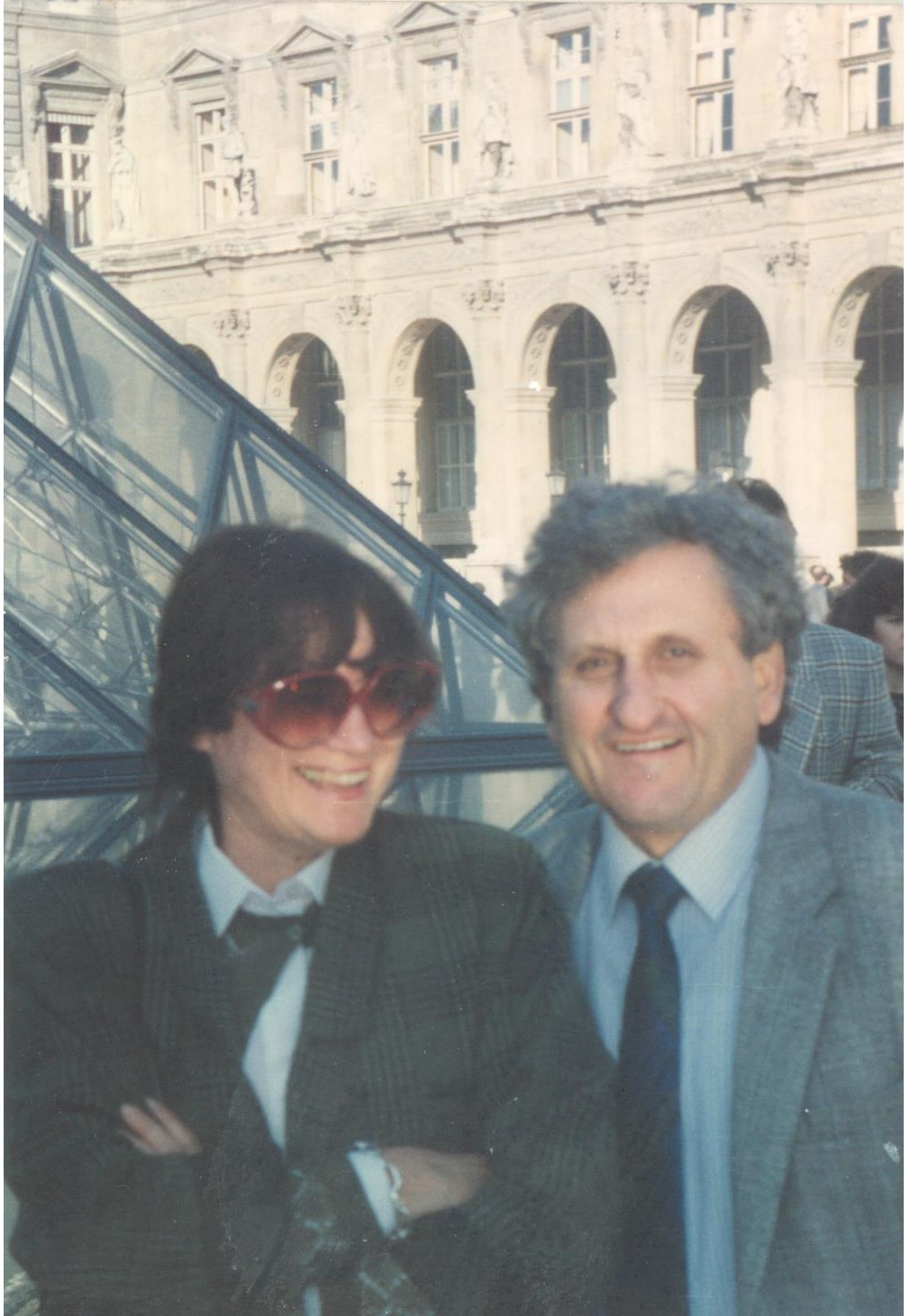
Yehoshua with his wife, Rivka, in Paris (1990s)

From the end of his military service, Yehoshua began to publish fiction. His first book of stories, Mot Hazaken (The Death of the Old Man), was published in 1962. He became a prominent figure in the "new wave" generation of Israeli writers, who differed from their predecessors in focusing more closely on individual and interpersonal concerns, rather than on the psychology of a group. Yehoshua named Franz Kafka, Shmuel Yosef Agnon, and William Faulkner as formative influences. Harold Bloom wrote an article about Yehoshua's A Late Divorce in The New York Times, mentioning the work again in his The Western Canon.

A.B. Yehoshua has a vivid and enthusiastic storytelling style. He is the author of twelve novels, three books of short stories, four plays, and four collections of essays, including Ahizat Moledet (Homeland Lesson, 2008), a book of reflections on identity and literature. His best-received novel, Mr Mani, is a multigenerational look at Jewish identity and Israel through five conversations that go backwards in time to cover over 200 years of Jewish life in Jerusalem and around the Mediterranean basin. It was adapted for television as a five-part multilingual series by director Ram Loevy. As do many of his works, his eighth novel, Friendly Fire, explores the nature of dysfunctional family relationships in a drama that moves back and forth between Israel and Tanzania. His works have been translated and published in 28 countries; many have been adapted for film, television, theatre, and opera.

== Views and opinions ==
Yehoshua was an Israeli Peace Movement activist. He set out his political views in essays and interviews and attended the signing of the Geneva Accord. Yehoshua was both a long-standing critic of the Israeli occupation and also of Palestinian political culture.

He and other intellectuals mobilized on behalf of the dovish New Movement before the 2009 elections in Israel.

According to La Stampa, before the 2008–2009 Israel-Gaza conflict he published an appeal to Gaza residents urging them to end the violence. He explained why the Israeli operation was necessary and why it needed to end: "Precisely because the Gazans are our neighbours, we need to be proportionate in this operation. We need to try to reach a cease-fire as quickly as possible. We will always be neighbours, so the less blood is shed, the better the future will be." Yehoshua added that he would be happy for the border crossings to be opened completely and for Palestinians to work in Israel as part of a cease-fire.

Yehoshua was criticized by the American Jewish community for his statement that a "full Jewish life could only be had in the Jewish state." He claimed that Jews elsewhere were only "playing with Judaism." "Diaspora Judaism is masturbation," Yehoshua told editors and reporters at The Jerusalem Post. In Israel, he said, it is "the real thing."

== Awards and recognition ==
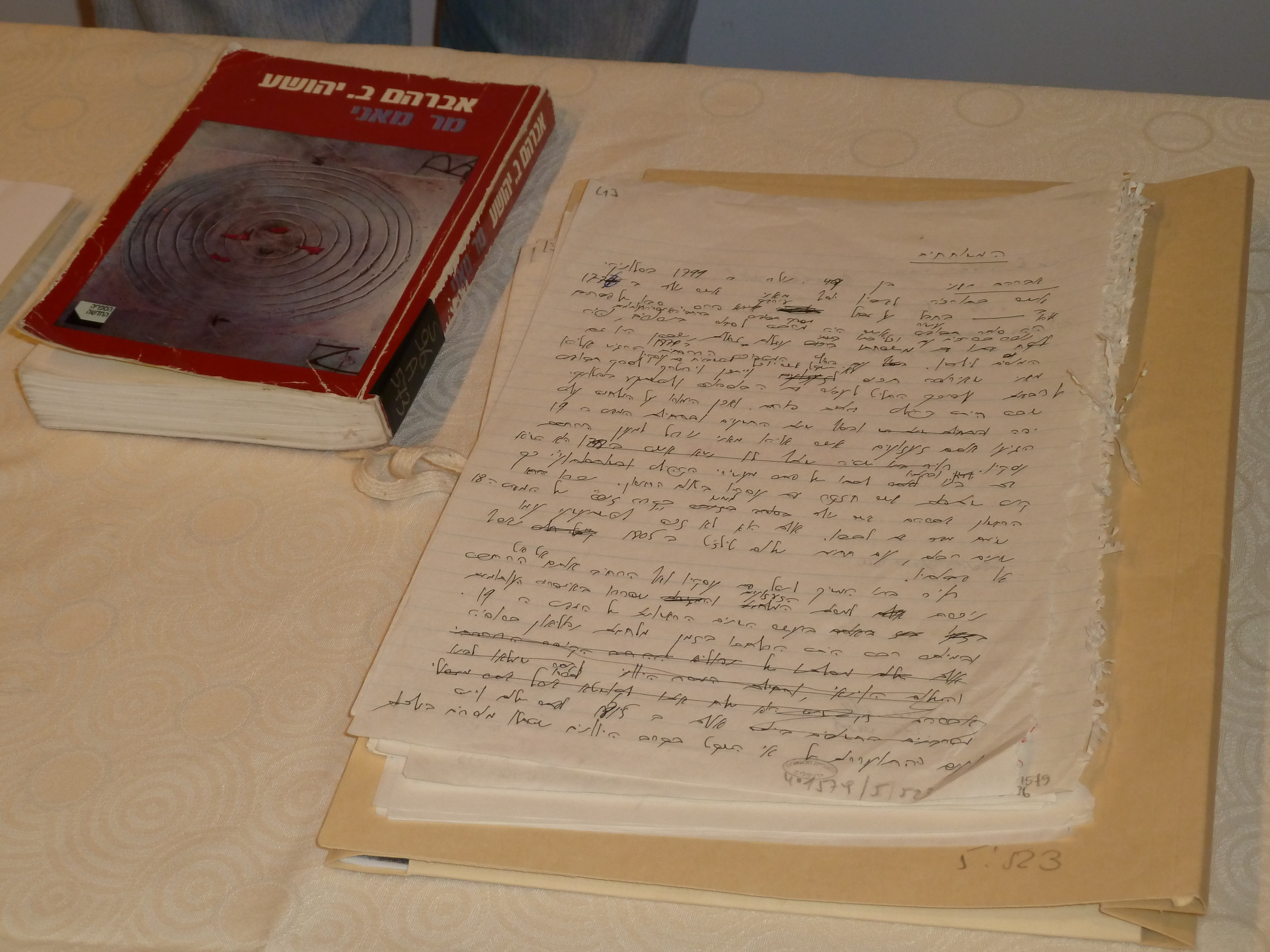
Mr. Mani manuscript, National Library of Israel, Jerusalem

- In 1972, Yehoshua received the Prime Minister's Prize for Hebrew Literary Works.
- In 1983, he was awarded the Brenner Prize.
- In 1986, he received the Alterman Prize.
- In 1989, he was a co-recipient (jointly with Avner Treinin) of the Bialik Prize for literature.
- In 1995, he was awarded the Israel Prize for Hebrew literature.
- He has also won the National Jewish Book Award for Five seasons in 1990 and the Koret Jewish Book Award in the U.S.
- Yehoshua was shortlisted in 2005 for the first Man Booker International Prize.
- In 2006, "A Woman in Jerusalem" was awarded the Los Angeles Times Book Prize.
- In Italy, he received the Grinzane Cavour Award, the Flaiano Superprize, the Giovanni Boccaccio Prize, and the Viareggio Prize for Lifetime Achievement. In 2003, his novel The Liberated Bride won both the Premio Napoli and the Lampedusa Literary Prize. Friendly Fire won the Premio Roma in 2008.
- He received honorary doctorates from Hebrew Union College (1990), Tel Aviv University (1998), Torino University (1999), Bar-Ilan University (2001), and Scuola Normale Superiore di Pisa (2012).
- In November 2012, Yehoshua received the Prix Médicis étranger for his novel חסד ספרדי (English: The Retrospective; French: Rétrospective).
- In 2017 he received the Dan David Prize Award.

== Quotes ==
- "[Diaspora Jews] change [their] nationalities like jackets. Once they were Polish and Russian; now they are British and American. One day they could choose to be Chinese or Singaporean...For me, Avraham Yehoshua, there is no alternative... I cannot keep my identity outside Israel. [Being] Israeli is my skin, not my jacket.
- "I ask myself a question that must be asked: What brought the Germans and what is bringing the Palestinians to such a hatred of us? ... We have a tough history. We came here out of a Jewish experience, and the settlements are messing it up."
- "We are not bent on killing Palestinian children to avenge the killing of our children. All we are trying to do is get their leaders to stop this senseless and wicked aggression, and it is only because of the tragic and deliberate mingling between Hamas fighters and the civilian population that children, too, are unfortunately being killed. The fact is that since the disengagement, Hamas has fired only at civilians. Even in this war, to my astonishment, I see that they are not aiming at the army concentrations along the border but time and again at civilian communities"
- "It’s possible that there will be a war with the Palestinians. It’s not necessary, it’s not impossible. But if there is a war, it will be a very short one. Maybe a war of six days. Because after we remove the settlements and after we stop being an occupation army, all the rules of war will be different. We will exercise our full force. We will not have to run around looking for this terrorist or that instigator—we will make use of force against an entire population. We will use total force. Because from the minute we withdraw I don’t even want to know their names. I don’t want any personal relations with them. I am no longer in a situation of occupation and policing and B’Tselem [the human rights organization]. Instead, I will be standing opposite them in a position of nation versus nation. State versus state. I am not going to perpetrate war crimes for their own sake, but I will use all my force against them. If there is shooting at Ashkelon, there is no electricity in Gaza. We shall use force against an entire population. We shall use total force. It will be a totally different war. It will be much harder on the Palestinians. If they shoot Qassam missiles at Ashkelon, we will cut electricity to Gaza. We shall cut communications in Gaza. We shall prevent fuel from entering Gaza. We will use our full force as we did on the Egyptian [Suez] Canal in 1969. And then, when the Palestinian suffering will be totally different, much more serious, they will, by themselves, eliminate the terror. The Palestinian nation will overcome terrorism itself. It won’t have any other choice. Let them stop the shooting. No matter if it is the PA [Palestinian Authority] or the Hamas. Whoever takes responsibility for the fuel, electricity and hospitals, and sees that they do not function, will operate within a few days to stop the shooting of the Qassams. This new situation will totally change the rules of the game. Not a desired war, but definitely a purifying one. A war that will make it clear to the Palestinians that they are sovereign. The suffering they will go through in the post-occupation situation will make clear to them that they must stop the violence, because now they are sovereign. From the moment we retreat I don’t want to know their names at all. I don’t want any personal relationship with them, and I am not going to commit war crimes for their own sake."

== Works in English translation ==
=== Novels ===
- The Lover [Ha-Me'ahev, 1977]. Garden City N.Y., Doubleday, 1978 (translated by Philip Simpson). Dutton, 1985. Harvest/HBJ, 1993. ISBN 978-0-15-653912-8. London, Halban Publishers, 2004, 2007. ISBN 1870015-91-6.
- A Late Divorce [Gerushim Meuharim, 1982]. London, Harvill Press, 1984. Garden City N.Y., Doubleday, 1984. London, Sphere/Abacus Books, 1985. New York, Dutton, 1985. San Diego, Harcourt Brace, 1993. ISBN 978-0-15-649447-2. London, Halban Publishers 2005. ISBN 187-0-01-5959.
- Five Seasons [Molcho, 1987]. New York, Doubleday, 1989. New York, Dutton Obelisk, 1989. London, Collins, 1989. Harmondsworth, Penguin Books, 1990. London, Fontana, 1990, ISBN 978-1-870015-94-3. London, Halban Publishers, 2005, ISBN 1870015-94-0.
- Mr. Mani [Mar Mani, 1989]. New York, Doubleday, 1992. London, Collins, 1992. London, Peter, 1993, 2002 ISBN 1-870015-77-0. San Diego, Harvest/HBJ, 1993. London, Phoenix/Orion Books, 1994. ISBN 978-1-85799-185-7.
- Open Heart [Ha-Shiv`a Me-Hodu (The Return from India), 1994]. Garden City N.Y., Doubleday, 1995. London, Halban Publishers, 1996, ISBN 978-1-87-001563-9. San Diego, Harvest/HBJ, 1997. ISBN 978-0-15-600484-8.
- A Journey to the End of the Millennium [Masah El Tom Ha-Elef, 1997]. New York, Doubleday & Co., 1999. London, Peter Halban, 1999. ISBN 1-870015-71-1.
- The Liberated Bride [Ha-Kala Ha-Meshachreret, 2001]. London, Peter Halban, 2003, 2004, 2006. ISBN 1-870015-86-X.
- A Woman in Jerusalem [Shlihuto Shel Ha-memouneh Al Mashabei Enosh (The Human Resources Supervisor's Mission), 2004]. London, Halban Publishers, 2006, 2011. ISBN 978-1-905559-24-4. New York, Harcourt, 2006. ISBN 978-0-15-101226-8.
- Friendly Fire: A Duet [Esh Yedidutit, 2007] London, Halban Publishers, 2008, ISBN 978-1-905559-19-0. New York, Harcourt 2008, ISBN 978-0-15-101419-4.
- The Retrospective [חסד ספרדי]. New York, Houghton Mifflin Harcourt, 2013. ISBN 978-0-547496-96-2. London, Halban Publishers, 2013. ISBN 978-1-905559-56-5.
- The Extra, 2014
- The Tunnel, New York, Houghton Mifflin Harcourt The Tunnel, 2020 August 4 ISBN 978-1-328622-55-6. London, Halban Publishers The Tunnel, 2020 February 27 ISBN 978-1-912600-03-8.
- The Only Daughter, New York, Harper Via, 2023. ISBN 978-0-35-867044-5

=== Short stories ===
- Early in the Summer of 1970 [Bi-Thilat Kayitz, 1970, 1972]. Garden City N.Y., Doubleday, 1977. London, Heinemann, 1980. New York, Berkley Publishing, 1981. London, Fontana Paperbacks, 1990. ISBN 978-0-385-02590-4
- Three Days and a Child [Shlosha Yamim Ve-Yeled, 1975]. Garden City N.Y., Doubleday, 1970. London, Peter Owen, 1971. ISBN 978-0-7206-0161-9
- The Continuing Silence of a Poet. London, Peter Halban, 1988, 1999, ISBN 1-870015-73-8. London, Fontana Paperbacks, 1990. London, New York, Penguin, 1991. Syracuse, N.Y., Syracuse University Press, 1998. ISBN 978-0-8156-0559-1

=== Essays ===
- Israel. London, Collins, 1988. New York, Harper & Row, 1988. Jerusalem, Steimatzky/Collins Harvill, 1988.
- Between Right and Right [Bein Zechut Le-Zechut, 1980]. Garden City N.Y., Doubleday, 1981. ISBN 978-0-385-17035-2
- The Terrible Power of a Minor Guilt [Kocha Ha-Nora Shel Ashma Ktana, 1998]. New York, Syracuse University Press, 2000. ISBN 978-0-8156-0656-7
- "An Attempt to Identify the Root Cause of Antisemitism", Azure (Spring 2008).

=== Plays ===
- A Night in May [Layla Be-May, 1975]. Tel Aviv, Institute for the Translation of Hebrew Literature, 1974.
- Possessions [Hafatzim, 1986]. Portsmouth, Heinemann, 1993.
- Journey to the End of the Millennium, libretto for opera with music by Yosef Bardnaashvili. Premiered at Israeli Opera, May 2005.
- A Tale of Two Zionists. A play of 1934 meeting of Vladimir Jabotinsky and David Ben-Gurion 2012

== See also ==
- List of Israel Prize recipients
- List of Bialik Prize recipients

== Book articles ==
1. Horn, Bernard. "Sephardic Identity and Its Discontents: The Novels of A. B. Yehoshua" in Sephardism: Spanish Jewish History and the Modern Literary Imagination, Ed. Yael Halevi-Wise (Stanford University Press, 2012).
2. Halevi-Wise, Yael. "A. B. Yehoshua’s Mr. Mani and the Playful Subjectivity of History,” in Interactive Fictions: Scenes of Storytelling in the Novel. Westport, CT & London: Praeger, 2003. 132–145.
3. Morahg, Gilead. Shading the Truth: A. B. Yehoshua's 'Facing the Forests' IN: Cutter and Jacobson, History and Literature: New Readings of Jewish Texts in Honor of Arnold J. Band. Providence, RI: Program in Judaic Studies, Brown University; 2002. pp. 409–18
4. Feldman, Yael. Between Genesis and Sophocles: Biblical Psychopolitics in A. B. Yehoshua's Mr. Mani IN: Cutter and Jacobson, History and Literature: New Readings of Jewish Texts in Honor of Arnold J. Band. Providence, RI: Program in Judaic Studies, Brown University; 2002. pp. 451–64
5. Morahg, Gilead. A Story of Sweet Perdition: Mr. Mani and the Terrible Power of a Great Obsession. IN: Banbaji, Ben-Dov and Shamir, Intersecting Perspectives: Essays on A. B. Yehoshua’s Oeuvre. Hakibbutz Hameuchad (Tel Aviv, 2010), pp. 213–225.
