= The Lovers (Friant) =

1888 painting by Émile Friant

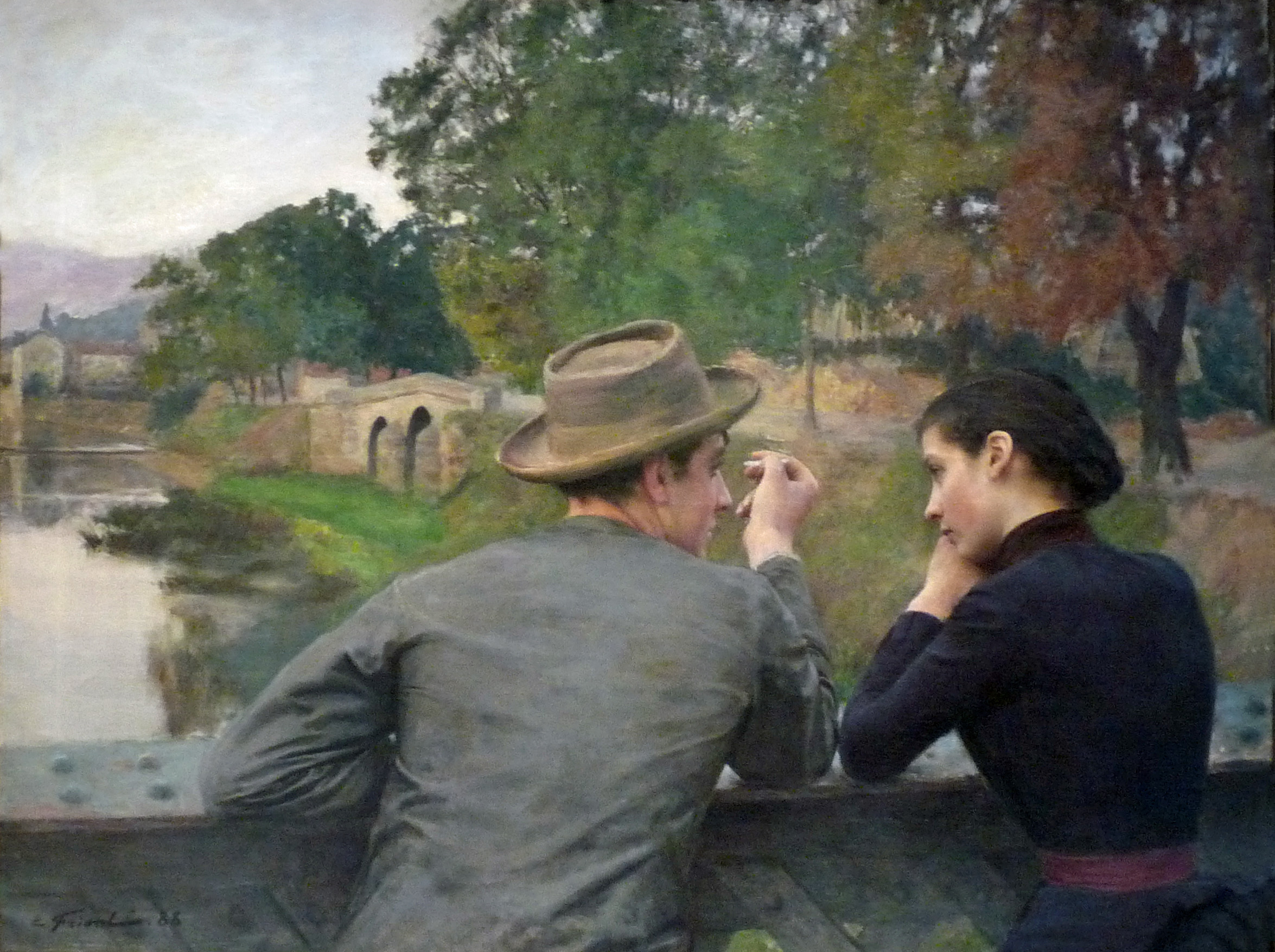
The Lovers (1888) by Émile Friant

The Lovers, also known as Idyll on a Bridge or Autumn Evening, is an 1888 oil-on-canvas painting by French artist Émile Friant (1863–1932). It is now in the Musée des beaux-arts de Nancy.
