= Dvora Bochman =

Israeli artist (born 1950)

Dvora Bochman דבורה בוצ'מן
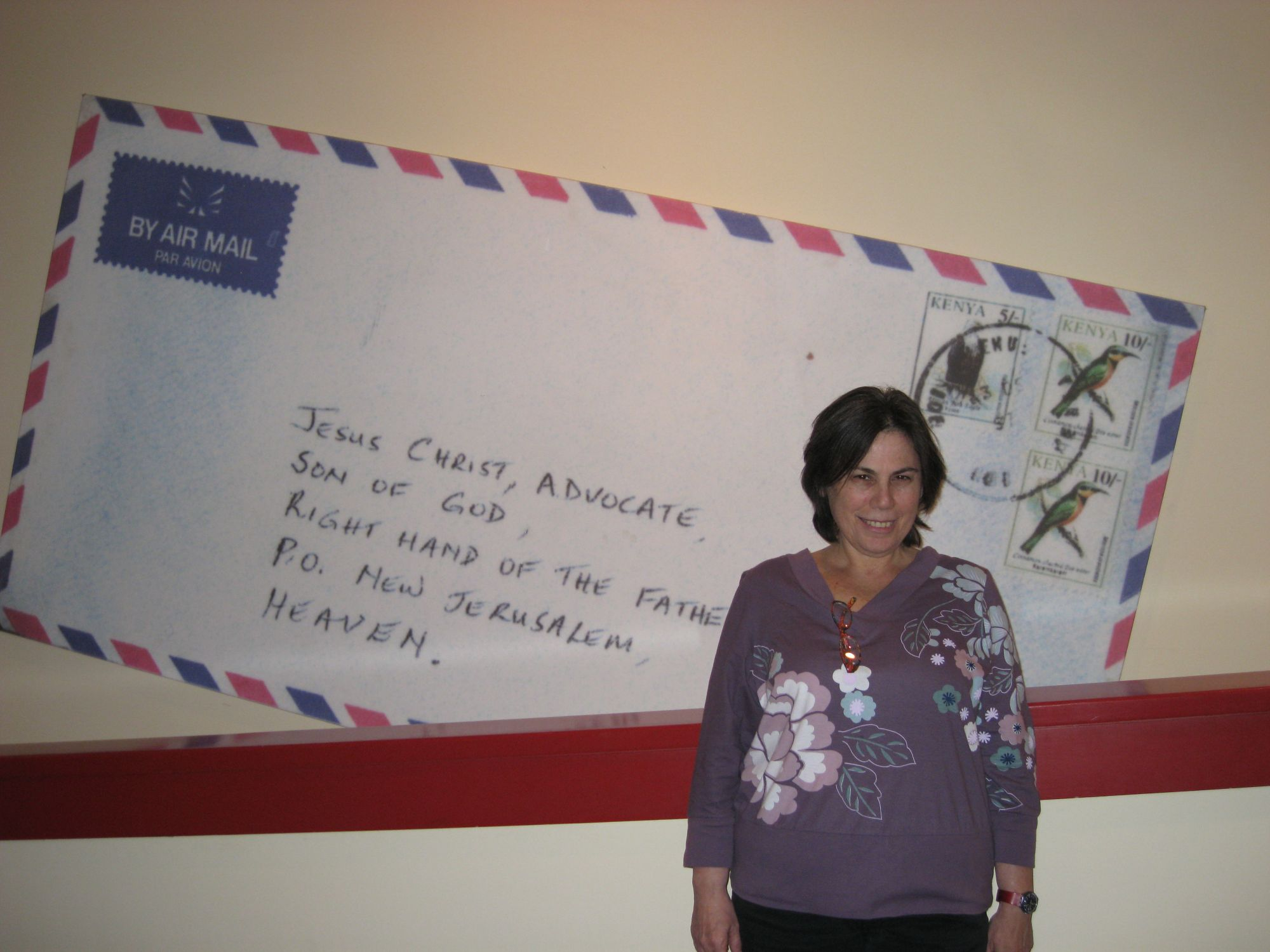
- Dvora Bochman at Eretz Israel Museum
- Born: 1950 (age 75–76); Tel Aviv, Israel
- Known for: Painting

Dvora Bochman (Hebrew: דבורה בוצ'מן; born 1950) is an Israeli artist, painter, sculptor, graphic designer and art educator.

== Early life and education ==
Dvora Bochman was born in 1950 as Dvora Rivka Zemel, to Shoshana Zemel and Arye Zemel. Bochman completed her art and education studies at Hamidrasha College for Arts in 1972. In 1972 she married Zvi Bochman and moved to Givatayim.

== Art career ==
In 1984, Bochman relocated to Nairobi, Kenya. During this time, she was involved in the local arts. She volunteered as a docent at the National Museum of Kenya where she attended training courses at the National Museums of Kenya in 1982. She assisted local theatrical companies by painting theatrical backgrounds for play and ballet productions, which included the Hurlington Players production of the Canterbury Tales, the National Theatre, and the Nairobi Ballet. She also took on commercial engagements including work for the Kenyan Postal Authority and murals. In the 1990s, Bochman was involved in producing stamps and other philatelic materials for post offices in Kenya and Israel. She also created some large scale compositions.

In 1992, Bochman returned to Israel and resumed her university education. She continued her artistic activities, accepting commercial commissions from the Israeli and Kenyan postal authorities as well as participating in art exhibitions.

In 2003 Bochman relocated to Budapest, Hungary. She volunteered as a docent in the Budapest Museum of Fine Arts and made several exhibitions. She joined many programs of the Museum of Fine Arts, where she was active as an art information scientist, setting up the digital library and instructing on better presentation skills.

As of 2012, she is a member of Israel Miniature Art Society (IMAS) and painters and sculptors association Givatayim Ramat-Gan.

== Works ==
Bochman has worked with oil paints and acrylics on canvas and plywood. More recent works include mixed media on a papier-mâché foundation, embedding of small objects and often featuring multi-chromatic glazing.

One of the notable works by Bochman was painted on a wooden wall and commissioned by Vamos & Partners Architects for the UNEP Headquarters in Nairobi. Another mural was a more abstract composition called Maasai Necklaces at the entrance of the Ya-Ya Centre in Nairobi.

== Scholarships ==
- 1968: a citation from the Department of Education Municipality Tel Aviv in jewelry design
- 1971: a score respect and scholarship from Sharet Foundation for young artists in Tel Aviv
- 1997: a scholarship from Beit-Berl for her B.A. studies in computer science

== Philatelic materials ==
Philatelic materials by Bochman
Year	Type	Subject	Location	Notes
1990	Stamps	Mushrooms	Nairobi Kenya	A series of mushroom stamps was made as the previous illustrator's work was visually unconvincing. The issue featured wild and cultivated mushrooms featuring Agaricus bisporus, Shiitake, and Termitomyces, which are notable for their symbiotic relationship with termites.
1991	Commemorative stamps	Zoo Animals	Jaffa, Israel	The series of dtamps of animals from the Jerusalem Biblical Zoo got an article on the first page of Linn's Stamp News. The lion stamp went on to represent Israel at the World philatelic competition of 1995 in Singapore and won an award. This series features the Asian lion, the Persian leopard, the chimpanzee and the Asian elephant.
1992	Commemorative Stamps	Vintage Motor Cars	Kenya	Zvi helped with the questionnaire that was sent to the collectors of cars. The information about each car was attached in the first day envelope of the series.
1992	Commemorative stamps	Big Five	Kenya	The big five in Kenya refers to the elephant, the lion, the water buffalo, the leopard and the black rhinoceros, which were the subject of this issue.
1994	Commemorative stamps	Orchids of Kenya	Kenya	In Kenya there are many species of orchids. Due to their tiny size they are hard to find.
1996	Commemorative stamps	Red Cross Society	Kenya	One of these stamps was used in the 2001 film Nowhere in Africa, which was mostly filmed in Kenya.
1996	Commemorative stamps	Lions International Kenya	Kenya	Lions is a charitable organization that helps the sick and underprivileged.

Philatelic materials produced for 1991-3 are included in the permanent collection of the Alexander Museum of Postal History and Philately, and near the entrance to the Eretz Israel Museum.

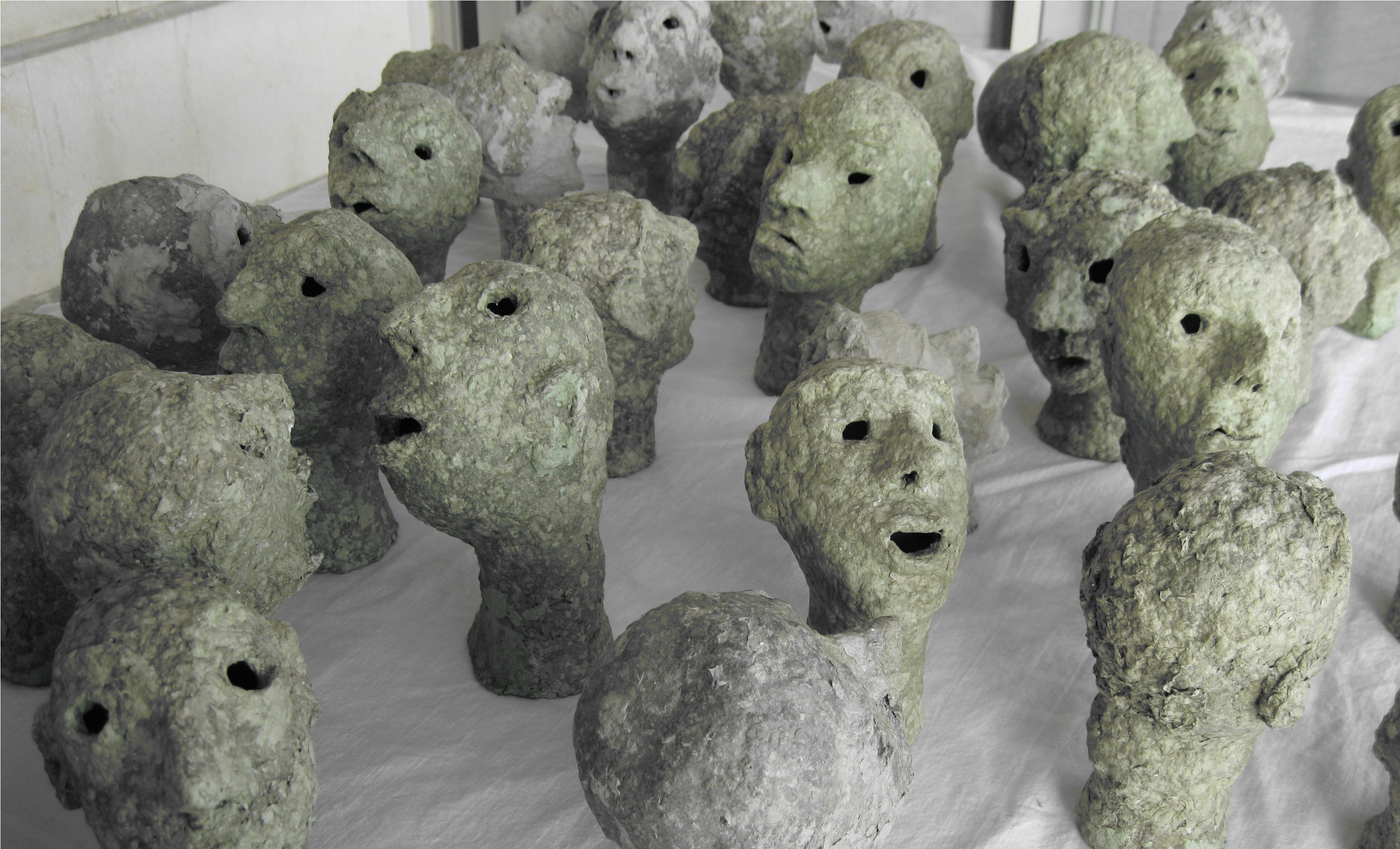
Bust, 2011, papier-mâché

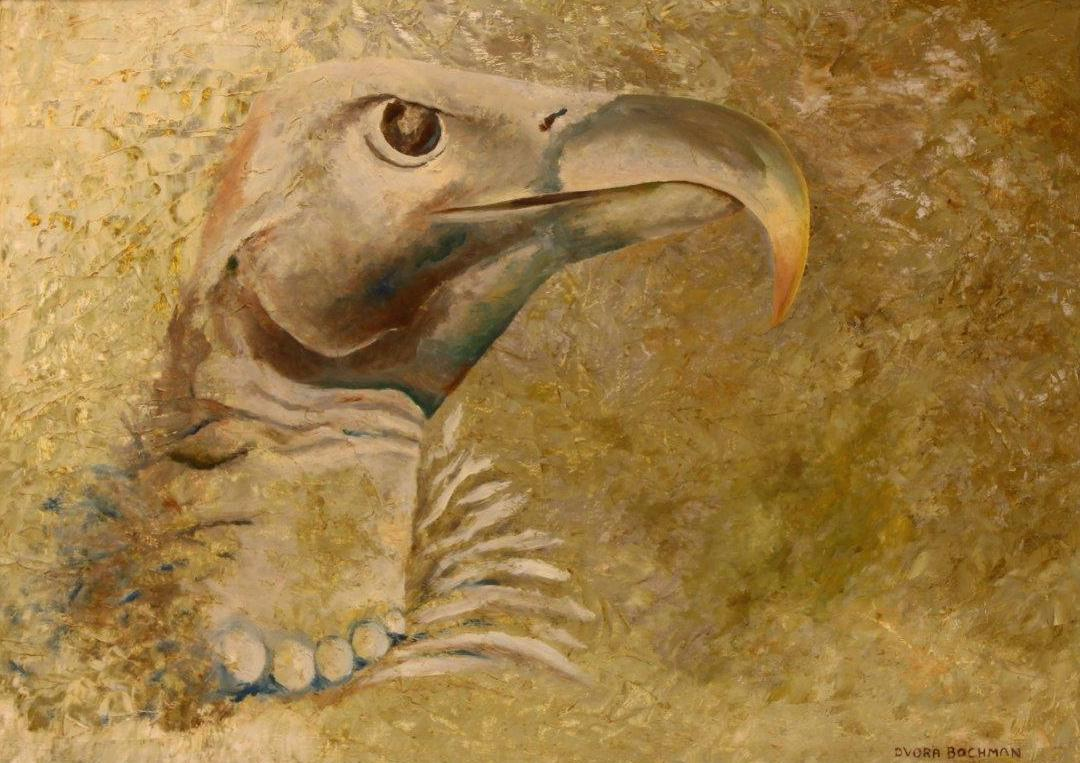
Oil on canvas, 2004

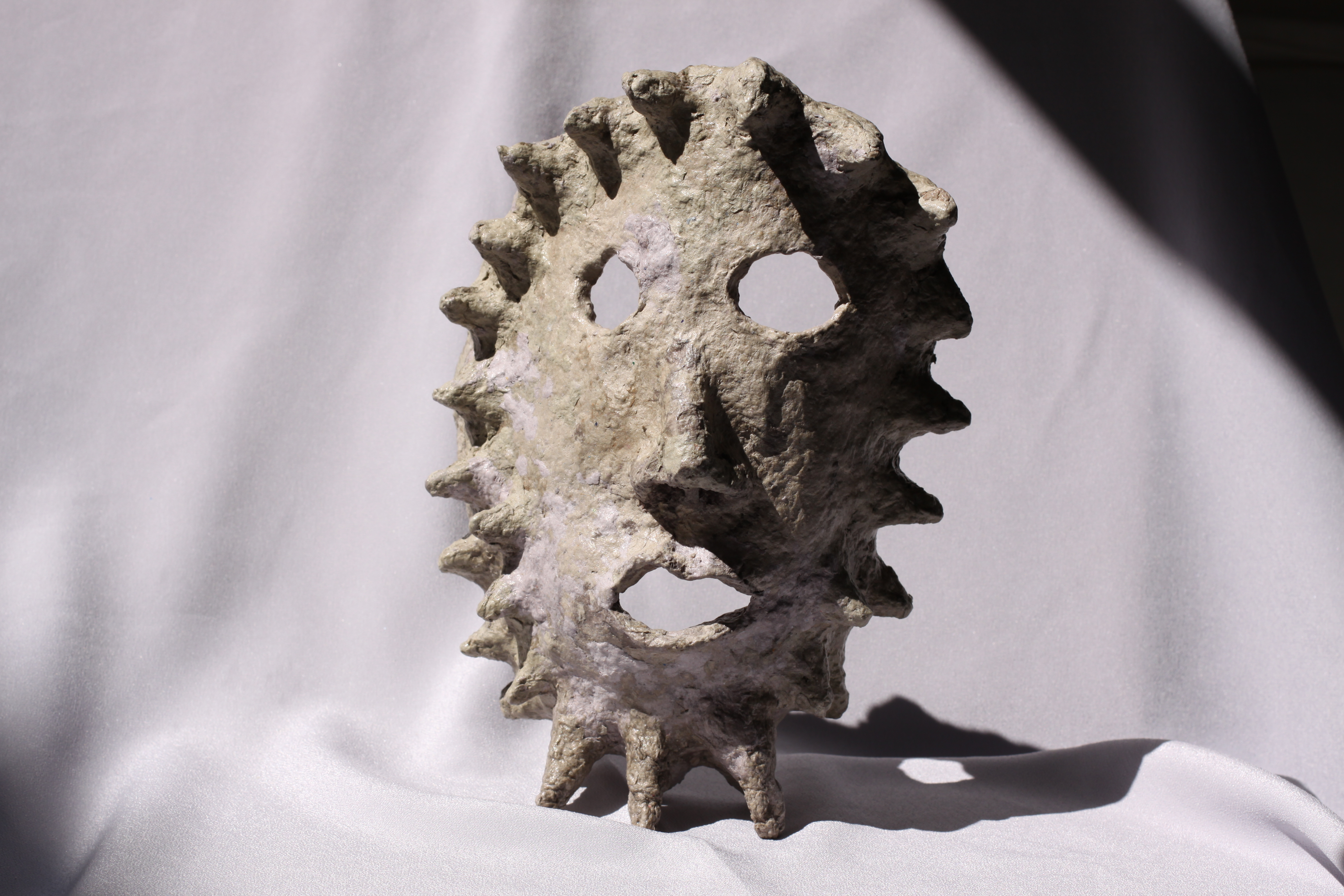
Papier-mâché mask, 2009

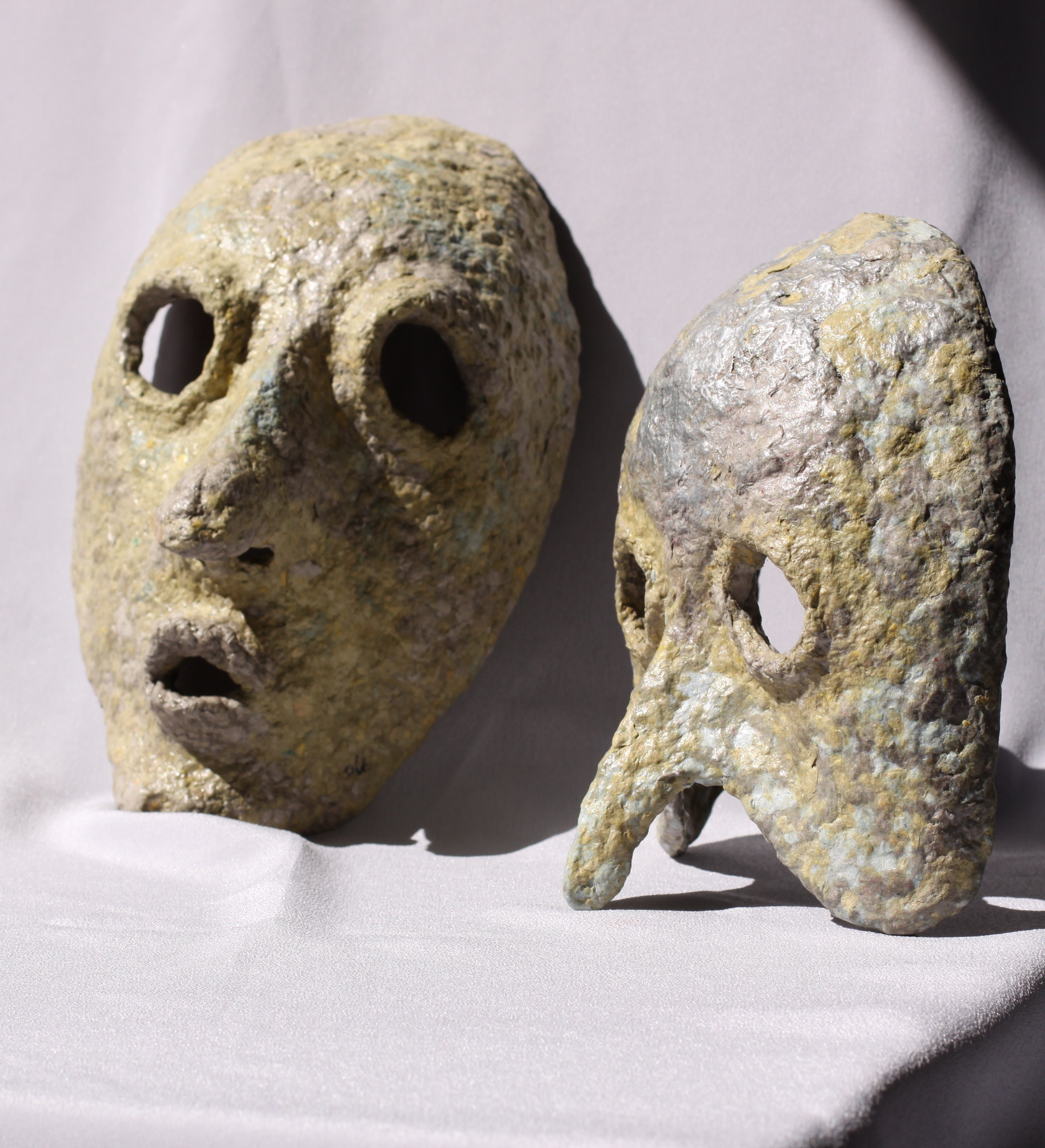
Papier-mâché masks, 2010

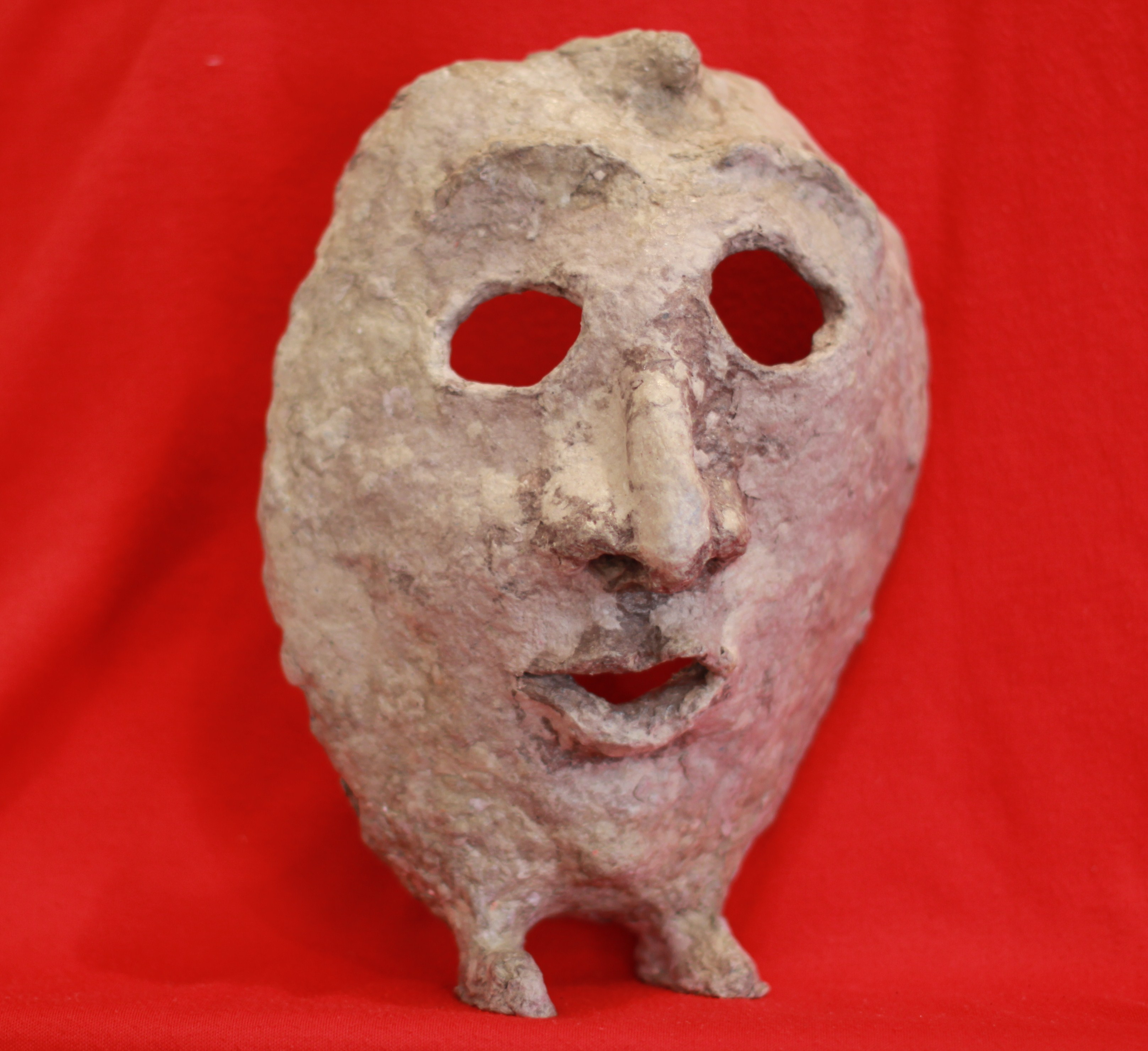
Papier-mâché mask, 2009

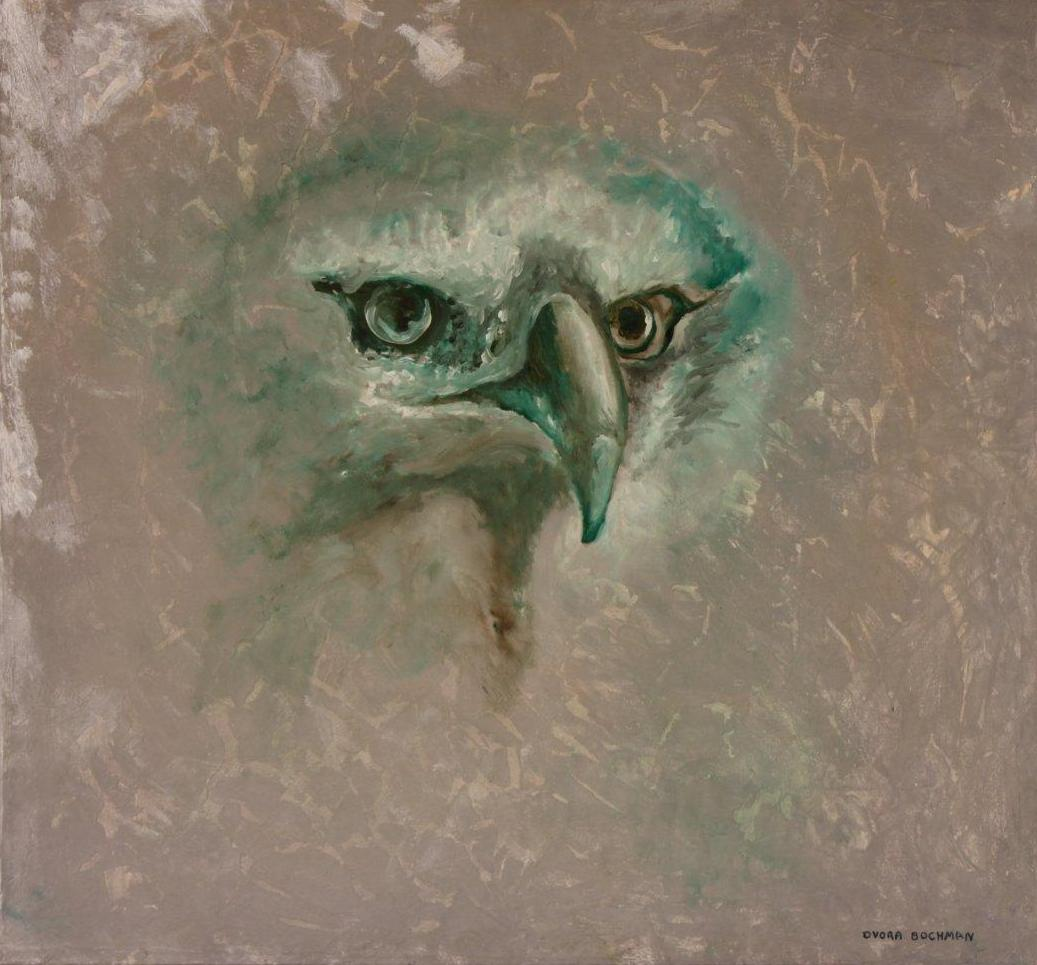
Oil on canvas, 2005

== Solo exhibitions ==
- 1979 Beit Sokolov (House of journalists) — Tel Aviv, Israel
- 1980 Beit-Emmanuel — Ramat-Gan, Israel
- 1984 French Cultural Center — Nairobi, Kenya
- 1985 Goethe Cultural Institute — Nairobi, Kenya – Fantastic Realism
- 2009 MadeByYou — Budapest, Hungary
- 2009 Rumbach Old Synagogue — Creation – in the 2012 Summer Festival Of Tolerance – Budapest, Hungary
- 2010 Bible House Museum — Tel Aviv, Israel

== Selected group exhibitions ==
- 2009 Biennale Venice – ScalaMata Gallery — Venice, Italy

== Exhibitions as curator ==
- 2012 CCA — Tel Aviv, Israel – “Mágia(r) kocka” – Hungarian Magic Cube – video exhibition of Hungarian artists

== See also ==
- Eretz Israel Museum
- Israel Museum
- Museum of Fine Arts (Budapest)
- National Museum of Kenya
