= Lindsay Daen =

New Zealand artist (1923–2001)

- Born: April 7, 1923; Dunedin, New Zealand
- Died: April 24, 2001 (aged 78); Sarasota, Florida, United States
- Occupation: Sculptor

Lindsay Daen (1923–2001), was a New Zealand sculptor and artist who worked and resided in Puerto Rico. Daen created landmark sculptures in Puerto Rico, Australia and the United States. He was a member of the Royal Art Society in Sydney, whose art work was exhibited worldwide. He was known for his early workings in 1934.

== Biography ==
Lindsay Daen was born in Dunedin, New Zealand in 1923 of Australian parents. He arrived in Australia aged six months. At age 16 he became a Sydney newspaper reporter.

During World War II he served in the Australian Army. From 1945 to 1948 Daen studied at East Sydney Technical School and the School of Arts in Adelaide, South Australia, where he concentrated in sculpture. His early ceramic sculptures were influenced by the aboriginal drawings and Melanesian carvings exhibited at the Sydney Art Museum. At the age of 25, he was elected into the Royal Art Society in Sydney. In late 1949, Daen, accompanied by his first wife, sailed for the United States, becoming permanent residents in 1951, though he retained his Australian citizenship.

In 1953, Daen moved to New Orleans, Louisiana, and settled into the French Quarter. There his career flourished with shows at the New Orleans Museum of Art, the Houston Museum of Fine Arts and the Whitney Museum of American Art in New York City.

Following the exhibition of his work at the Whitney, he accepted an invitation by the Puerto Rican Government in 1955 to bring the first major show of sculpture to the island. For the next 40 years, he resided in Old San Juan. He cast primarily in bronze at Codina Art Foundry in Madrid. Major works include La Rogativa (San Juan), The Journeyer (Philadelphia), Queen Adelaide (Adelaide), and Jemmy Morril and the Brolgas (Brisbane). His late works and installations are located in prominent public spaces and include Juan Bobo and the Basket, Joven con Pajaros (both located in San Juan) and The Lovers installed in the main plaza in the town of Isabela, Puerto Rico. During the last 17 years of his life, Daen collaborated and worked with his third wife Laura Ross Daen.

== Major works ==
Major public sculptures and monuments include:

- La Rogativa (1971) - bronze sculpture in Old San Juan, Puerto Rico commissioned for the 450th anniversary of the founding of the city
- The Journeyer (1975) - bronze sculpture in West Fairmount Park in Philadelphia, commissioned by the U.S. Bicentennial Commission
- Queen Adelaide (1980) - bronze sculpture in Adelaide's Town Hall
- Jemmy Morrill and the Brolgas (1983)- bronze sculpture in Brisbane's Botanical Gardens
- Juan Bobo and the Basket/Juan Bobo y la Canasta (1998) - bronze sculpture and fountain at the Antonia Quiñones Park in the El Condado district of San Juan.

== References and sources ==
- "Lindsay Daen: The Man and the Sculptures" Compiled by Laura Daen, UPR Press, ISBN 0-8477-2121-3
