= Ran Kunik =

Israeli mayor (born 1968)

- רן קוניק

6th Mayor of Givatayim
- Incumbent
- Assumed office 2013
- Preceded by: Reuven Ben-Shahar

Personal details
- Born: July 20, 1968 (age 58) Givatayim, Israel
- Party: Labor Party, Our Givatayim

Ran Kunik (Hebrew: רן קוניק; born July 20, 1968) is an Israeli politician, former table tennis player and former chairman of the Israel Table Tennis Association. A member of the Labor Party, he has been mayor of the Israeli city of Givatayim since 2013.

== Biography ==
Kunik was born, raised and educated in Givatayim. He began to play table tennis when he was 9 years old. He joined the table tennis club Hapoel Ramat Gan, and played there until his retirement in 1994.

In the 2008 municipal elections Kunik ran as the chairman of the "Our Givatayim" party, which won two seats on the city council. He also serves on the Board of Directors in the municipality's economic and planning and building committee and the committee treatment of Holocaust survivors living in the city. During the Municipal elections held on 22 October 2013 Kunik was elected mayor with 50.6% of the vote.

Political offices
Preceded by Reuven Ben Shachar	Mayor of Givatayim; 2013–present	Succeeded by Incubament
