= The Lover (Yehoshua novel) =

1977 novel by A. B. Yehoshua

- First edition (Hebrew)
- Author: A. B. Yehoshua
- Original title: המאהב
- Translator: Philip Simpson
- Language: English
- Published: 1977 שוקן
- Publication place: Israel
- Media type: print
- Pages: 352
- ISBN: 0156539128
- Dewey Decimal: 892.4/36
- LC Class: PJ5054.Y42 M413 1993

The Lover is the debut novel by A. B. Yehoshua, originally published in Hebrew in 1977. The book has been translated into 23 languages, and has been adapted for the screen twice. Written from the point of view of each of the six main characters, the book explores themes of adultery, war, Israeli national identity, and diaspora.

== Synopsis ==
Gabriel Arditi, an Israeli living in France, returns to Israel penniless in order to retrieve his dead grandmother's belongings, only to find out that she, though in a coma, has not yet died. Bringing his grandmother's dilapidated blue 1947 Morris to a nearby garage, he finds himself unable to pay for the repairs. Adam, the garage owner, takes Gabriel back to his home to work as a translator for his wife, Asya, in order to pay off the debt. Soon, Asya and Gabriel begin an affair. At the outbreak of the Yom Kippur War, Adam urges Gabriel to visit the recruitment office in order to avoid arrest, but once registering for service, Gabriel goes missing.

Adam begins to obsessively search for Gabriel, consulting army offices and visiting the hospital where Gabriel's grandmother, Veducha, lays comatose. Recruiting Na'im, an Arab boy who works in his garage, the two begin to search for the blue Morris under the guise of running a nighttime towing service. As the novel progresses, Na'im and Adam break into Veducha's apartment, only to find that she had awoken from her coma and returned in the days prior. Promising Veducha that they will locate Gabriel, Adam pays Na'im to be her live-in caretaker and continues his overnight towing operations. Na'im and Adam are soon joined by Adam's daughter, Dafi, and the two children begin a romantic relationship.

Losing hope, and with his daughter facing expulsion at school, Adam receives an urgent phone call from Dafi's school principal who has been involved in an accident. Upon arrival to the scene, Adam discovers that the black car that had collided with him was a repainted blue 1947 Morris, and suspects that the driver was Gabriel. He manages to locate the car in an ultra-Orthodox neighbourhood and finds Gabriel in disguise. Gabriel reveals that, having been sent to war, he was visited by a group of Orthodox Jews who had accidentally left behind a jacket. Growing out his sideburns and beard, Gabriel used the jacket to disguise himself as an ultra-Orthodox Jew and returned to civilian life by repainting his grandmother's car, which he had been using for work as a chauffeur for his adopted Haredi community ever since.

As Adam and Gabriel reconcile Gabriel's reappearance, Dafi is expelled from school. Asya brings Gabriel and Adam back to Haifa, and Na'im finds that Veducha is on the brink of death. Fearing that he, as an Arab, will be held responsible for her death, he flees to Dafi's house, and the two make love. Arriving home, Adam kicks Na'im out of the house and takes him to Veducha, where they find her dead. Adam, hesitant of the relationship between Na'im and his daughter, sends Na'im across the border to his home village. Deported and unwelcome, Na'im nonetheless finds himself euphoric and hopeful about his relationship with Dafi.

== Characters ==
Adam - A prosperous but emotionally detached garage owner.

Asya - A teacher completely devoted to her work, the emotionally divorced wife of Adam and mother to Dafi.

Dafi - A 15 year old girl and the daughter of Asya and Adam. Born to her parents after the death of their first child, she is neglected and lonely in her relationships, and rebellious at school.

Na'im - A teenage Arab boy and worker in Adam's garage. He finds himself bitter about his lack of education, but is highly intelligent and can recite Bialik poems from memory.

Gabriel - A former Israeli-turned-Frenchman, he lacks a livelihood and has drifted aimlessly since being hospitalized for mental health issues. Despising Israel, he reluctantly returns to collect his grandmother's inheritance only to find that she is still alive.

Veducha - Gabriel's sickly grandmother. Awaking from her coma, she finds herself needing to cope with her failing health and reconcile her anti-Arab racism with her new housemate, Na'im.
