= Luigia Cattaneo-Gentile (Van Dyck) =

Portrait by Anthony van Dyck

- A Noblewoman from Genoa
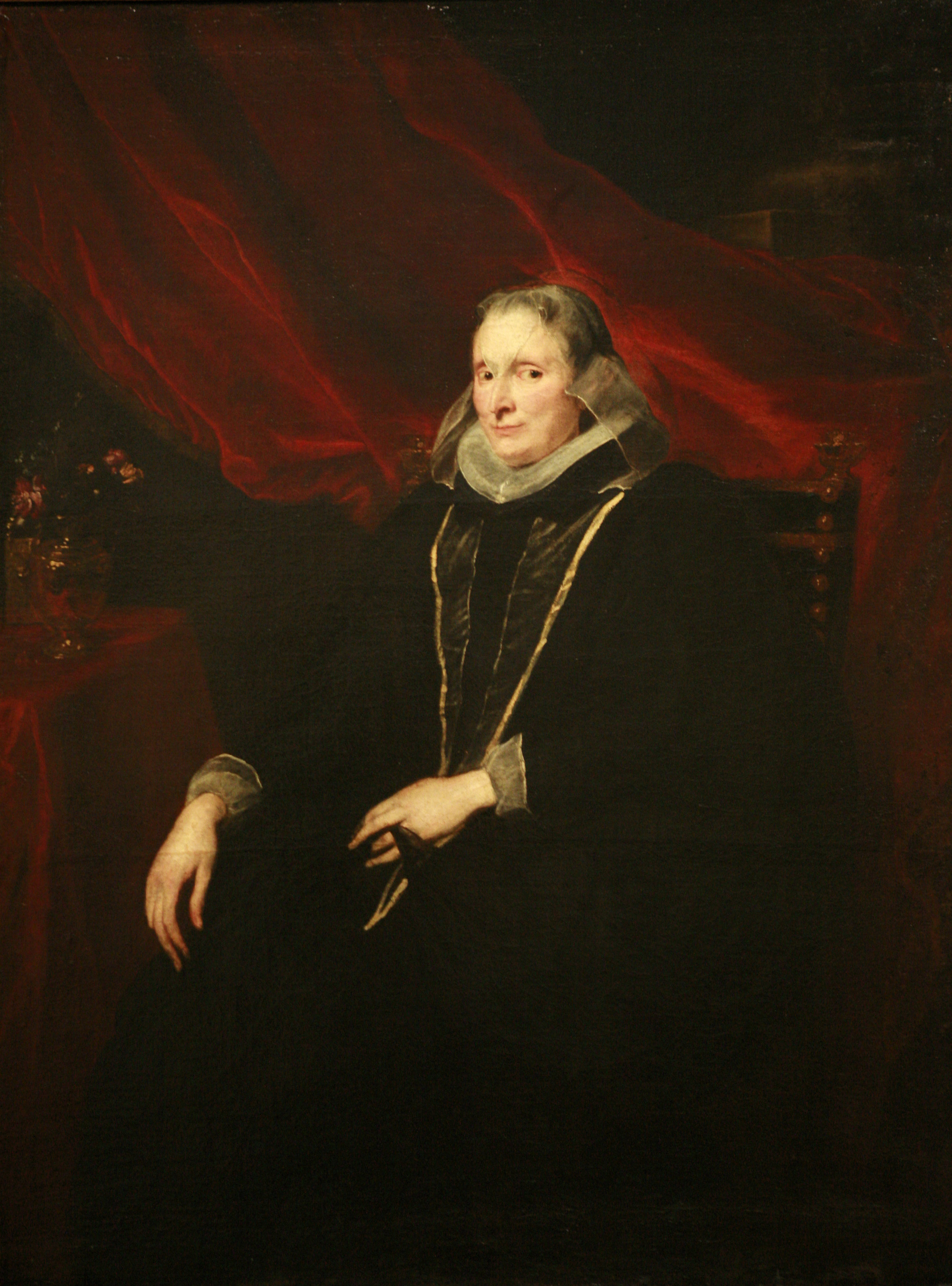
- Artist: Anthony van Dyck
- Year: circa 1622
- Medium: oil painting on canvas
- Movement: Baroque painting Portrait painting
- Subject: Portrait of an elderly woman from an aristocratic Northern Italian family
- Dimensions: 147 cm × 112 cm (58 in × 44 in)
- Location: Musée des Beaux-Arts, Strasbourg
- Accession: 1890

Luigia Cattaneo-Gentile, also known as A Noblewoman from Genoa, is a portrait painting by the Flemish Baroque painter Anthony van Dyck. It is on display in the Musée des Beaux-Arts of Strasbourg, France. Its inventory number is 200.

The portrait was most likely painted in 1622, during van Dyck's lengthy stay in Genoa, where he became the official portraitist of the members of the Genoese aristocracy. Luigia Cattaneo-Gentile was bought from the Durazzo family by Wilhelm von Bode in 1890 and was long thought to represent a marchesa from the House of Durazzo. The identification with the House of Cattaneo-Gentile instead, while already hypothesized in 1890, was only confirmed in 1986 by the van Dyck specialist, Susan J. Barnes.

From 1929 to 1965, the painting was attributed to Peter Paul Rubens, which was testament to its superior pictorial qualities, until the Rubens specialist Justus Müller-Hofstede determined that it was definitely an early masterpiece by a young Anthony van Dyck.

== See also ==
- List of paintings by Anthony van Dyck
