= Charles-Édouard Chaise =

French painter

Charles-Édouard Chaise (1759, Paris – 1798, Fontainebleau) was a French neoclassical painter.

== Life ==
His father was a painter, art dealer and member of the Académie de Saint-Luc. Charles-Edouard studied under Jean Bonvoisin in 1775, then under Jean-Jacques Lagrenée, before winning second prize in the 1778 prix de Rome with David condemning to death the Amalekite bringing him Saul's diadem.

== Surviving works ==
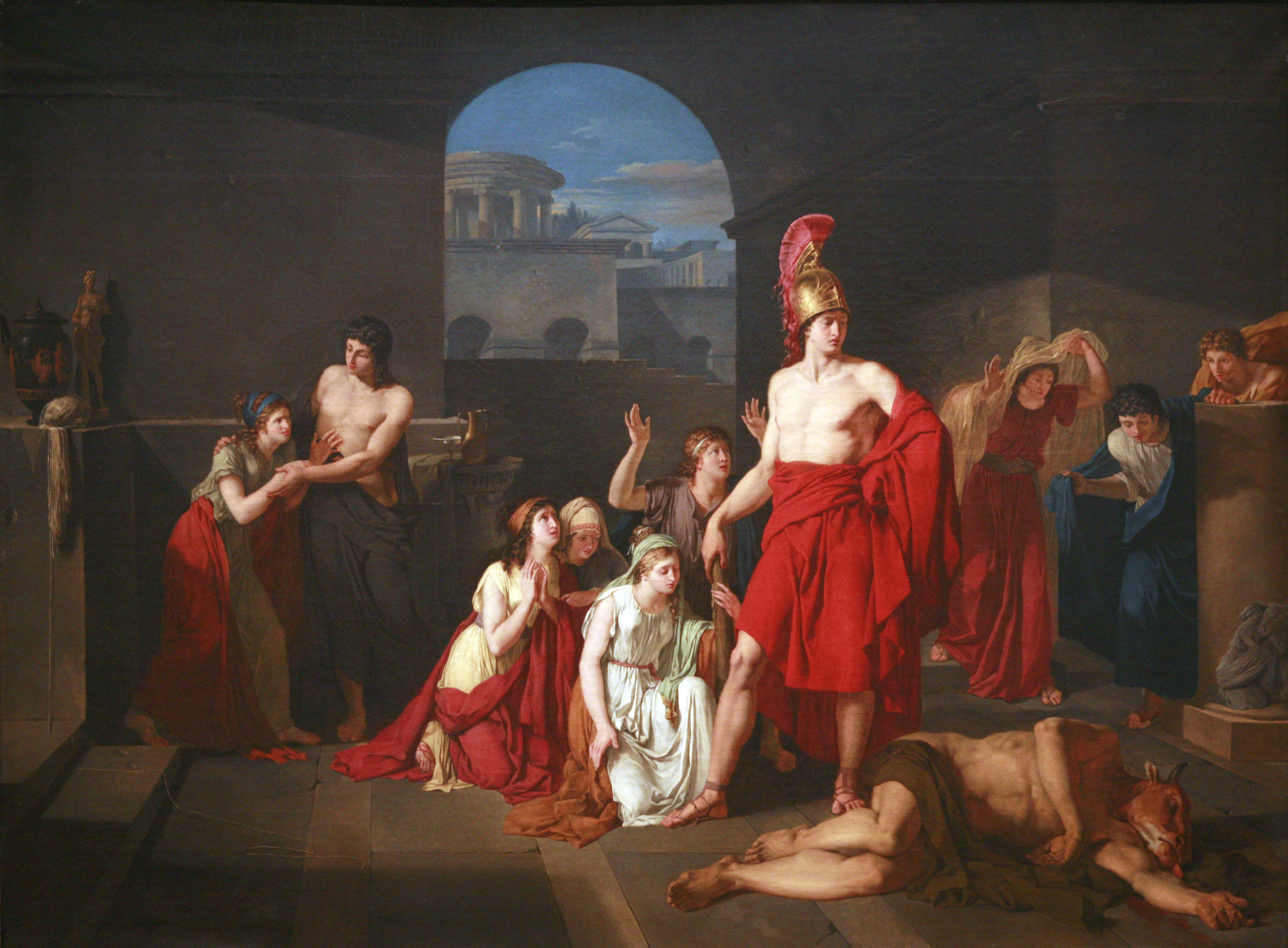
Theseus, defeater of the Minotaur, 1791

- Nancy, Musée des Beaux-Arts, Herminie mourning for Tancred, drawing, 1792.
- Reims, Musée des Beaux-Arts, Pelias's daughters demanding that Medea rejuvenate their father, oil on canvas.
- Strasbourg, Musée des Beaux-Arts, Theseus, defeater of the Minotaur, oil on canvas

== Salons ==
1783, Salon de la Correspondance

- XXII, A Vestal offering a sacrifice.
- XXIII, Another [Vestal] who reverses the altar on which the sacred flame burns
- XXIV, The Prodigal Son.
- LIX, A painting representing Hope consoling Love
- LX, A sketch representing Innocence seduced by Love

1791, Salon de la Société des Amis des Arts

- n° 61, Sketch for his painting of Oedipus discovered by Shepherds
- n° 62, Sketch for his painting of the death of Diogenes
- n° 63, Crayon drawing in three colours, historical subject
- n° 95, Prudence sleeping.

Salons (of the ex-académie Royale)

1791

- n° 128, Young woman making an offering to the god Pan
- n° 647, Prudence sleeping.
- n° 724, Shepherds of Arcadia.
- n° 733, Pelias's daughters demanding that Medea rejuvenate their father, Musée de Reims.
- n° 764, Festival to Bacchus.

1793

- n° 23, Two young people at a window.
- n° 260, Septimius Severus reproaching his son for having wished to assassinate him.
- n° 266, Young woman at her toilette

== Bibliography ==
- (in French) Dominique Jacquot, «À propos de Thésée vainqueur du Minotaure du musée des Beaux-Arts de Strasbourg. Jalons pour Charles-Édouard Chaise.» La Revue des Musées de France. Revue du Louvre, 1 February 2007, pages 55–60
