= La Belle Strasbourgeoise =

Painting by Nicolas de Largillière

- English: The Beautiful Strasbourg Woman
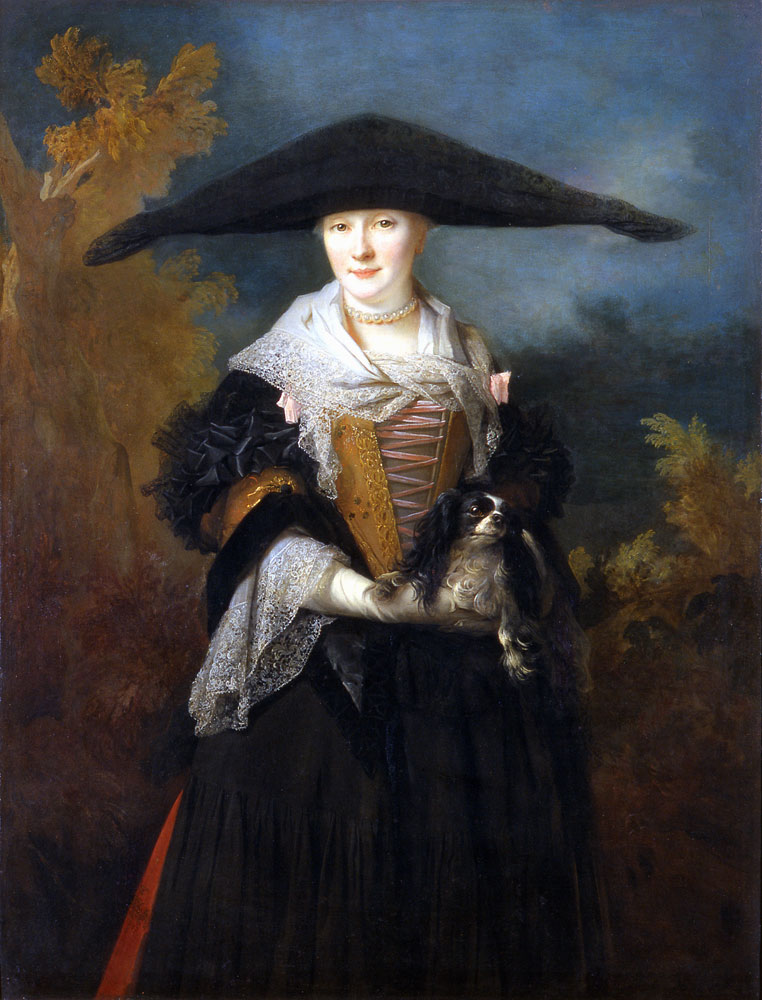
- Artist: Nicolas de Largillière
- Year: 1703
- Medium: oil painting on canvas
- Movement: Baroque painting Portrait painting Animal painting
- Subject: A young woman with an Alsatian costume holding a Cavalier King Charles Spaniel
- Dimensions: 138 cm × 106 cm (54 in × 42 in)
- Location: Musée des Beaux-Arts, Strasbourg
- Accession: 1963

La Belle Strasbourgeoise (The Beautiful Strasbourg Woman) is a 1703 painting by the French painter Nicolas de Largillière. It is now in the Musée des Beaux-Arts of Strasbourg, France. Its inventory number is 2146.

== Description and history ==
La Belle Strasbourgeoise is the most famous of the circa 1,500 portrait paintings by Largillière, and arguably the most iconic work in the Strasbourg museum. The identity of the depicted woman is unknown: she may be someone from the Strasbourg bourgeoisie, or a young Parisian in disguise (Strasbourg had become part of France only 22 years prior, in 1681), or the painter's own sister, Marie Elisabeth de Largillière. The costume she is wearing was fashionable in the Strasbourg patriarchy between 1688 and 1730.

The painting had always enjoyed the highest esteem. The list of its former owners is prestigious: it had belonged to Ange Laurent Lalive de Jully, then to César Gabriel de Choiseul, and later to François Coty; in the interval, it had also hung in the Château de Bussy-Rabutin. The Strasbourg museums tried to acquire it in 1936, but did not succeed; in 1963, a second effort, with the help of Cécile de Rothschild (1913–1995), and a public subscription, was successful.

The painting was bought at Sotheby's in London on 3 July 1963 for the then very considerable sum of 145,000 British pounds (equivalent to £3,835,171 in 2023), or 1,999,000 French francs at the time. The museum finally paid 1,725,500 French francs, thanks to a deduction agreed by the owner, Violet Leah Fitzgerald, and Sotheby's. It was still the highest price paid by a French museum for the purchase of a work of art until that date. Not everybody in Strasbourg was enthusiastic – Robert Heitz, a local politician who was also a noted painter, called it "a fake masterpiece", "the too beautiful and too costly Strasbourg Woman", "a sugary painting with the elegance of a retouched photo, mostly suited for the taste of nouveaux riches", etc. In 1967, Heitz painted a bitter parody of the portrait, called La Vieille Strasbourgeoise (The Old Strasbourg Woman).

== Second version ==
A second and almost identical version of the painting, probably painted at the same time, was sold on 15 September 2020 at Christie's in Paris for 1,570,000 Euro, well above the estimated price. The canvas had belonged to Paul-Louis Weiller, who had bought it in London in 1967. The new private owner is said to be "from Asia".

== See also ==
- La Belle Strasbourgeoise (beer)
