= Portrait of Marguerite de Sève =

1729 painting by Nicolas de Largillière

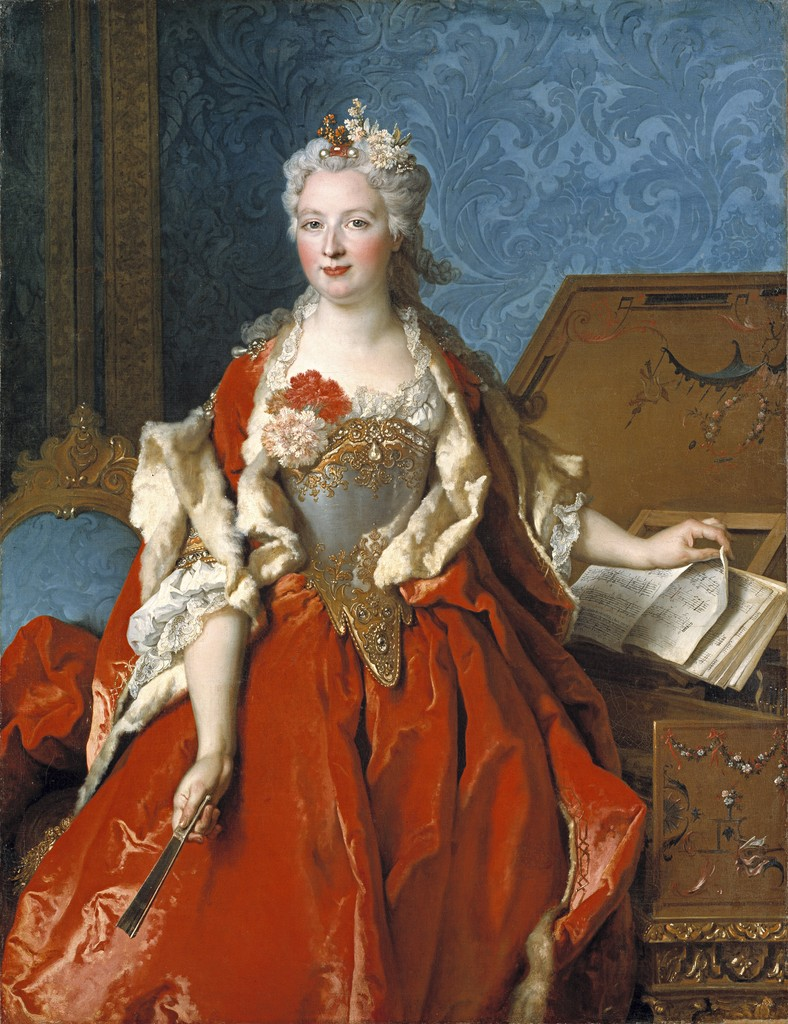
- Year: 1729
- Medium: oil on canvas
- Dimensions: 38.4 cm × 106.4 cm (15.1 in × 41.9 in)
- Location: Timken Museum of Art, San Diego, California, U.S.

Portrait of Marguerite de Sève is a 1729 oil painting on canvas by Nicolas de Largillière. It is held at the Timken Museum of Art, in San Diego. Largillière painted a matching portrait of Sève's husband, Portrait of Barthélemy-Jean-Claude Pupil, the same year, and two are considered a pair.
