= Nicolas de Largillière =

French painter (1656–1746)

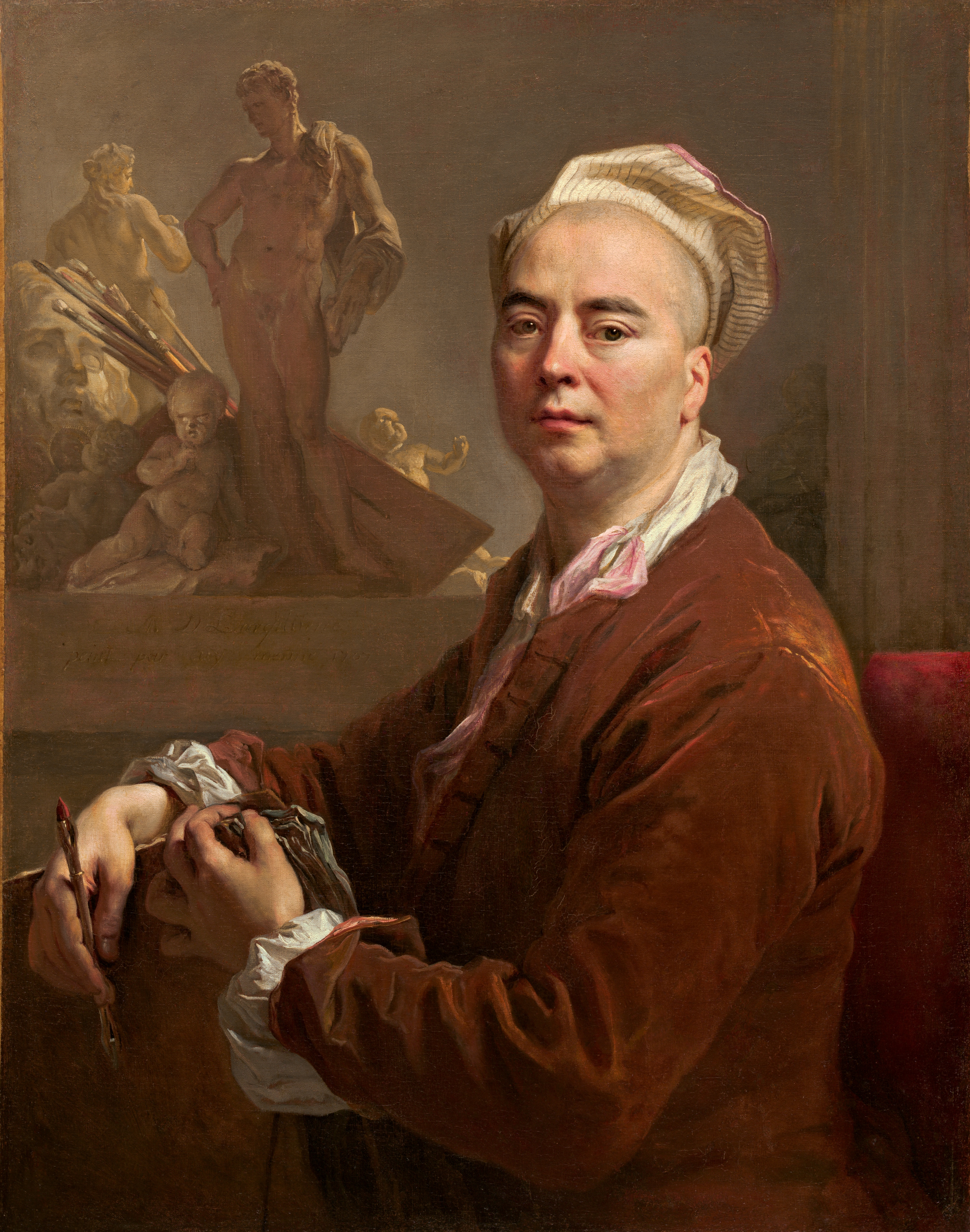
- Self-portrait from 1707
- Born: Paris, Kingdom of France
- Baptised: 10 October 1656
- Died: 20 March 1746 (aged 89); Paris, Kingdom of France
- Resting place: Church of Saint-Merri
- Education: Anton Goubau, Peter Lely, Antonio Verrio
- Known for: Painter
- Notable work: Self-portraits; La Belle Strasbourgeoise (1703)
- Movement: Baroque
- Spouse: Marguerite Élisabeth Forest

Director of the Académie de Peinture et de Sculpture
- In office 1733–1735 (Note: The directorship of the Académie was shared until February 1735 between Largillière and the three other rectors: Hyacinthe Rigaud, Claude-Guy Hallé, and Guillaume Coustou)
- Monarch: Louis XV
- Preceded by: Louis de Boullogne
- Succeeded by: Guillaume Coustou
- In office 1738–1742
- Preceded by: Guillaume Coustou
- Succeeded by: René Frémin

Nicolas de Largillière (French: [nikɔla də laʁʒijiɛʁ]; baptised 10 October 1656 – 20 March 1746) was a French painter and draughtsman. From 1733 until 1735, he was director of the Académie de Peinture et de Sculpture.

== Biography ==
=== Early life ===
Largillière was baptised at the Church of Saint-Barthélemy in Paris on 10 October 1656. The son of a merchant hatmaker, his family moved to Antwerp when Largillière was around three years old. Following a trip to London, Largillière's father apprenticed him to the Flemish painter Anton Goubau. However, he left at the age of eighteen and again went to England, where he was befriended and employed by Sir Peter Lely for four years at Windsor, Berkshire. While there, Largillière also worked under the direction of Italian painter Antonio Verrio.

=== Painting career ===
==== Early career ====
His painting caught the attention of Charles II, who wished to retain Largillière in his service, but the controversy aroused by the Rye House Plot against Roman Catholics alarmed Largillière. He left for Paris, where he was well received by the public as a painter.

Upon ascending to the throne in 1685, James II requested Largillière to return to England. James II offered Largillière the office of keeper of the royal collections, but he declined due to being uneasy about Rye House Plot. However, during a short stay in London, he painted portraits of the king, the queen Mary of Modena, and the prince of Wales James Francis Edward Stuart. The portrait of the Prince of Wales could not have been painted during Largillière's stay in London because the prince was not born until 1688. The three portraits painted by Largillière of the prince in his youth must have been executed in Paris, where he returned sometime before March 1686. The portrait of King James II was painted in 1686. King James is portrayed in golden armor with a white cravat and is positioned in front of a watercolour-like background set in a round frame.

==== French Academy ====
In 1686, Largillière produced a portrait of the painter Charles Le Brun for admittance to the Académie royale de peinture et de sculpture. The portrait shows Le Brun, then the chairman of the academy, at work on an entombment, surrounded by classical busts and figurines scattered upon the floor and table within the picture. Le Brun, impressed by Largillière's portrait, accepted him to the academy. In 1690, Largillière was documented by the French Academy as a historical painter, which was a prominent artistic trend of the academy.

In 1693, Largillière painted the Governor of Arras, Pierre de Montesquiou, to celebrate his promotion to brigadier in 1691.

In 1694, Largillière's made a multi-figure work that is displayed in the church of Saint-Étienne-du-Mont.

In 1709, Largillière painted the royal family portrait of The Family of Louis XIV. This portrait shows King Louis XIV, Madame de Ventadour (governess of the children of the Duke of Burgundy), the 3-year old Louis, Duke of Brittany, Louis, Grand Dauphin and Louis, Duke of Burgundy, future dauphin. The King displays a sense of slight uneasiness unlike the other figures especially. In the painting, Largillière used the Renaissance technique of structured disposition.

Charles LeBrun (1686)

A year later, Largillière painted a self-portrait which also contained two female members of his family.

Following the death of directeur Louis de Boullogne on 28 November 1733, the painter Hyacinthe Rigaud proposed that the four rectors of the Académie, Largillière, Claude-Guy Hallé, Guillaume Coustou, and himself, rotate the post. This oligarchy would persist until the election of Coustou as sole director on 5 February 1735. Largillière became director in 1738 and remained in that position until 1742.

==== Later career ====
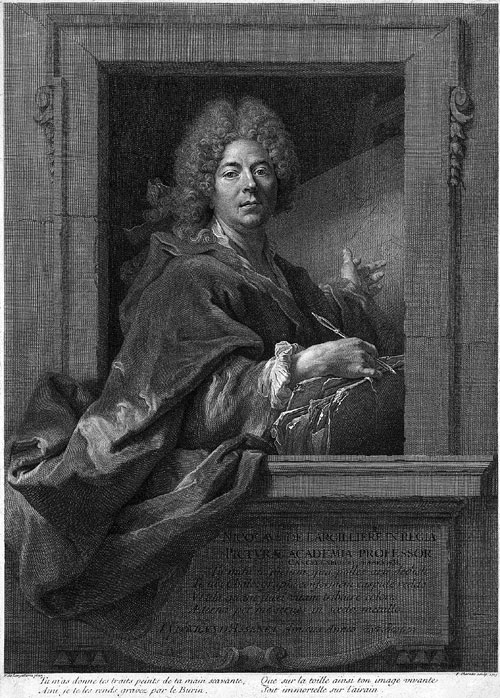
Self-portrait of Nicolas de Largillierre. Engraving by François Chereau (1715).

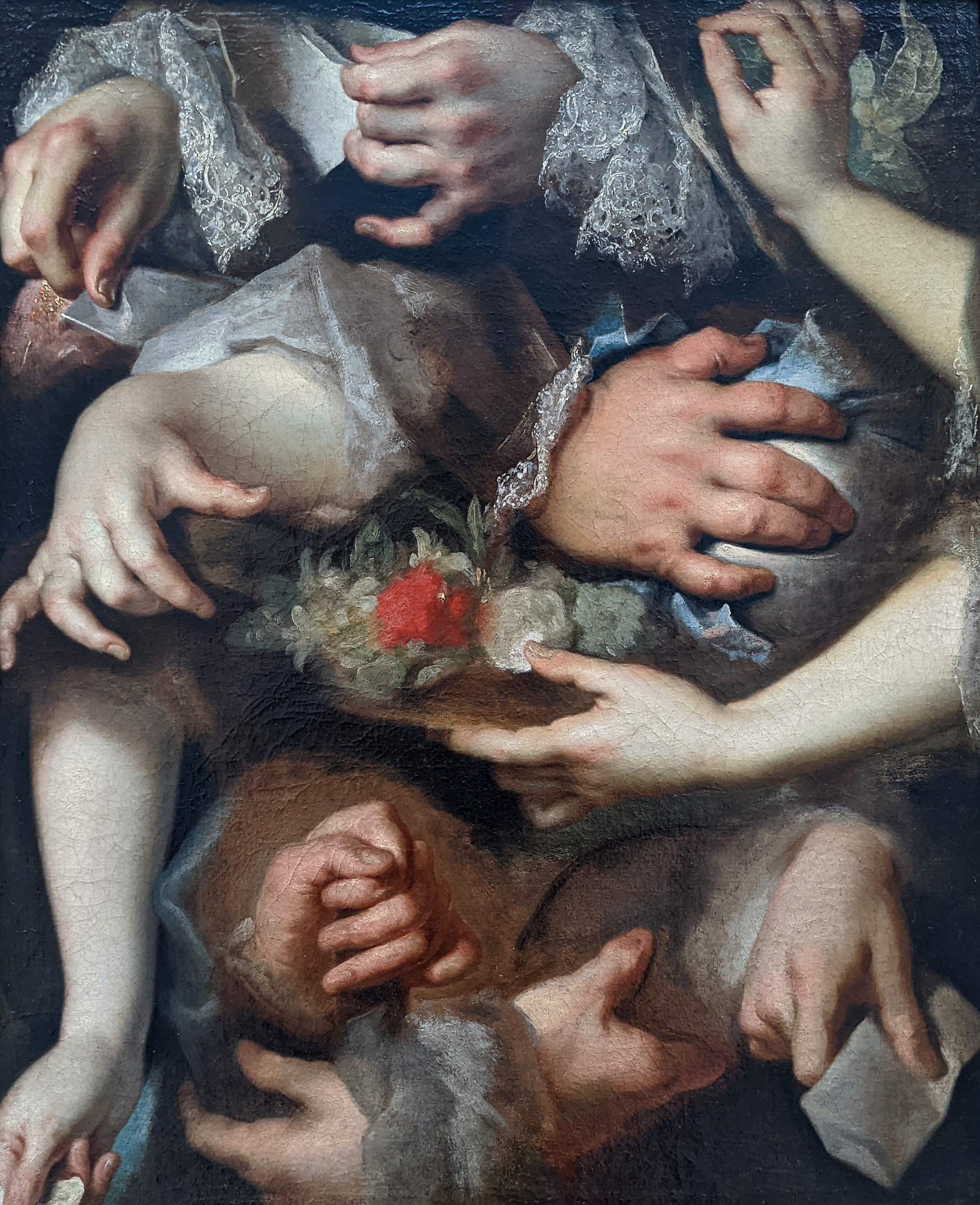
Study of hands (Musée du Louvre)

Towards the end of his life, Largillière painted a repetition of anonymous male portraits of Parisian nobles. One example was painted in 1710, of a man standing with spread fingers that conceal a letter held in the other hand. Another portrait from about 1715 shows a frontal three quarter view of a man dressed in similar clothes and wig with a Doric column in the background.

In 1714, Largillière painted King Augustus II the Strong of Poland. Largillière also painted the artist Jacques-Antoine Arlaud in a red robe in a similar fashion to Largillière's portrait of the painter Charles Le Brun, as well as the sculptor Nicolas Couston. Around the next year, Largillière painted The Study of Different Types of Hands, which currently resides in the Louvre.

In 1718, Largillière painted the French poet and essayist Voltaire.

The Entry of Christ into Jerusalem was a landscape painting that Largillière painted in 1720.

Largillière made his last self-portrait in 1725. This portrait displays the artist at his easel staring toward the audience.

Largillière was appointed as chancellor of the French Academy in 1743.

=== Death ===
Nicolas de Largillière died on 20 March 1746 at the age of 89. Upon his death, he donated to France several small landscapes and still life pictures he had created.

=== Legacy ===
The Ashmolean Museum (University of Oxford), the Fitzwilliam Museum (University of Cambridge), the Metropolitan Museum of Art (New York City), the Honolulu Museum of Art, the Louvre, the National Gallery of Art (Washington D.C.), the Nelson-Atkins Museum of Art (Kansas City, Missouri), the Musée des Beaux-Arts de Strasbourg and Pinacoteca di Brera (Milan), Calouste Gulbenkian Museum, Museu Nacional de Arte Antiga (Lisbon), Museum de Fundatie (Zwolle), the Detroit Institute of Arts (Detroit) and the Speed Art Museum (Louisville) are among the public collections holding works by Nicolas de Largillière.

Jean-Baptiste Oudry and Jacob van Schuppen, Largillière's pupil and nephew respectively, were also rococo painters.

== Gallery ==
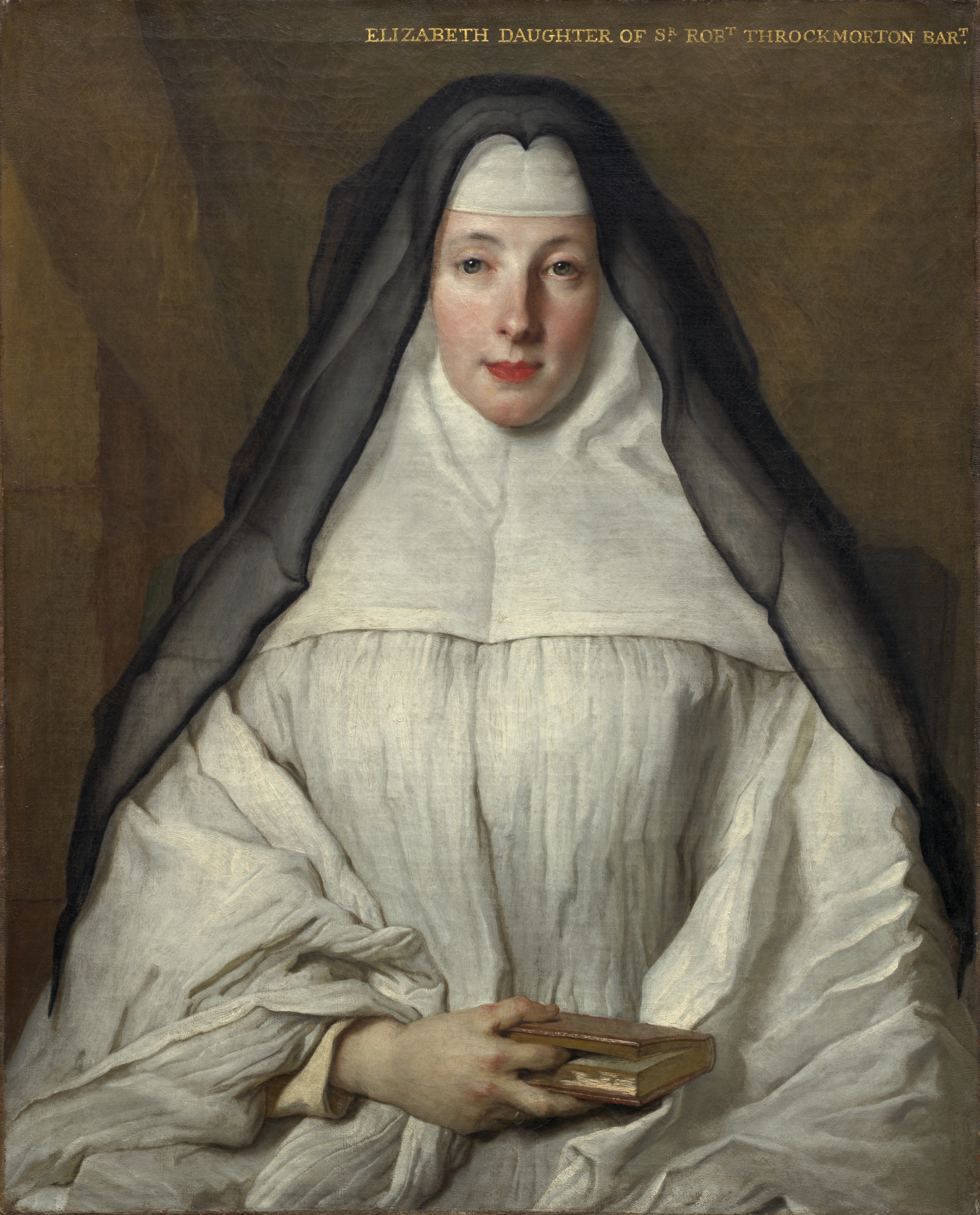
Portrait of Elizabeth Throckmorton

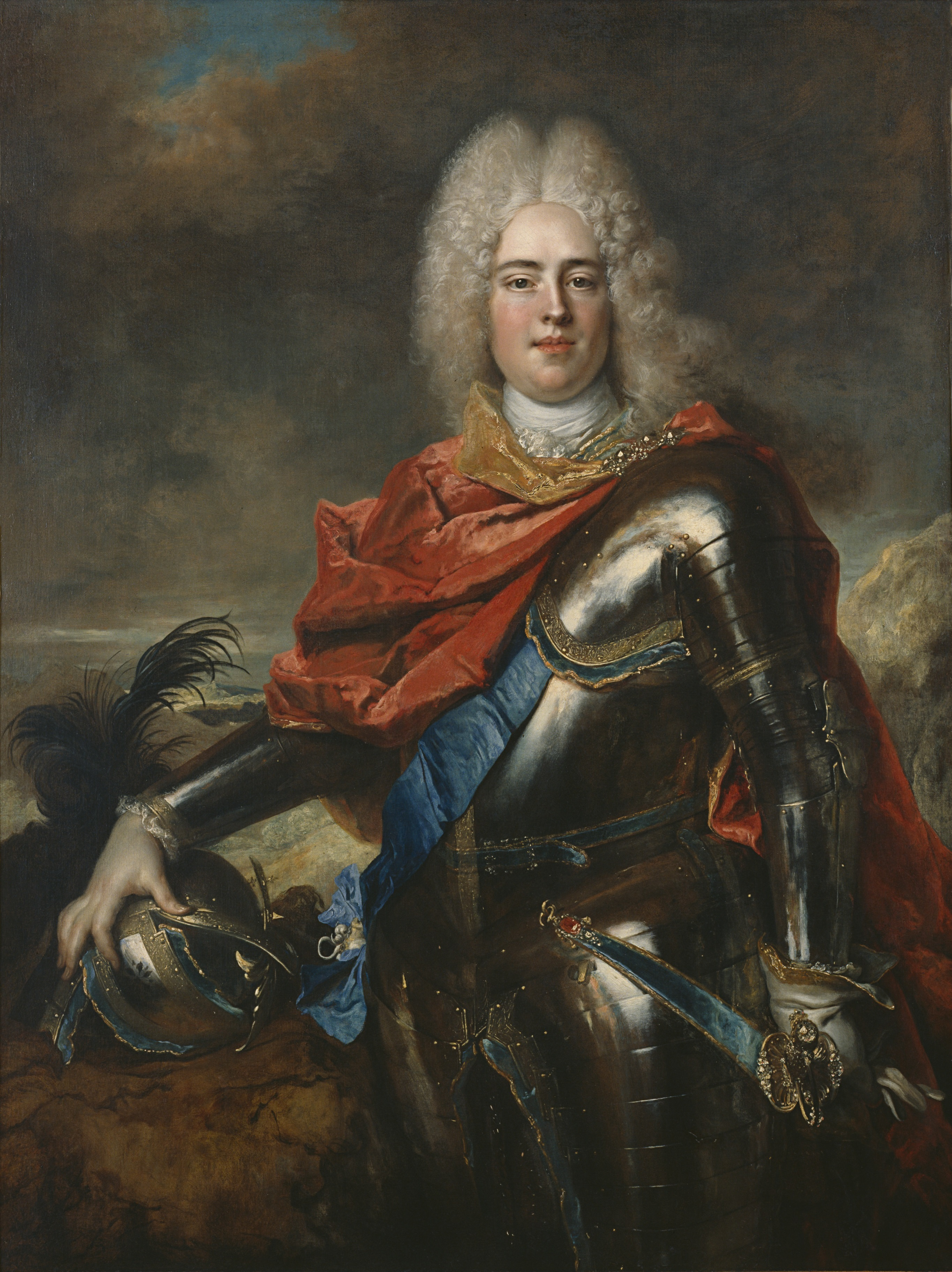
Portrait of Augustus III of Poland

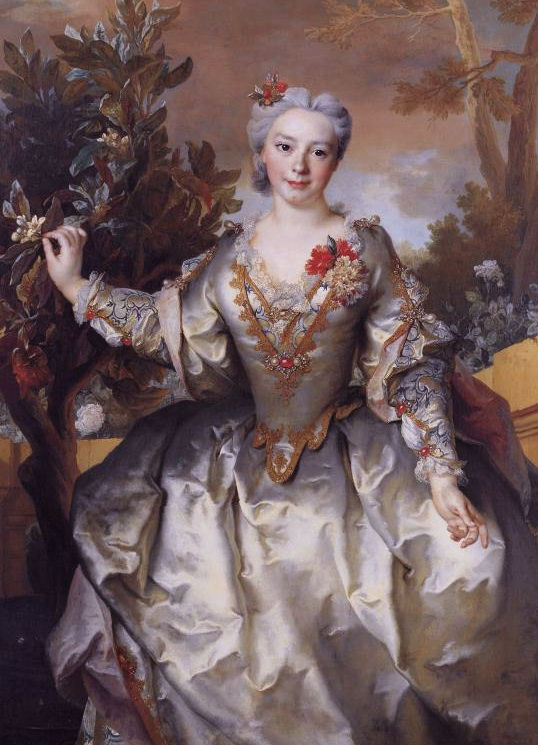
Portrait of Louise-Madeleine Bertin, Countess of Montchal

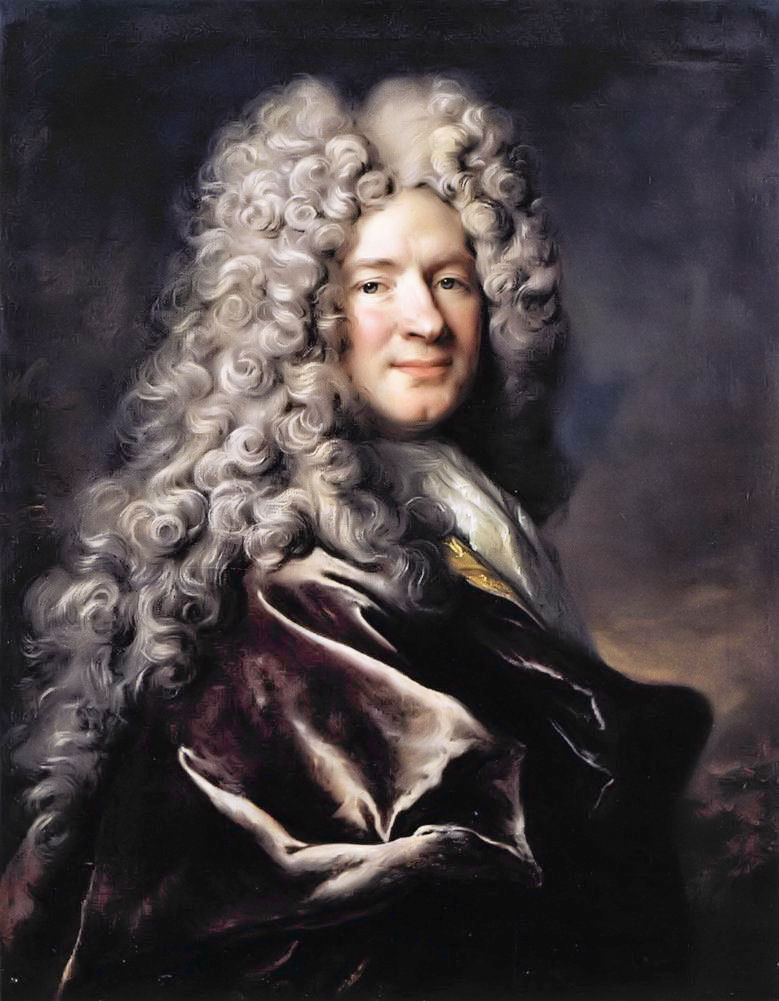
Portrait of a Man in a Purple Robe

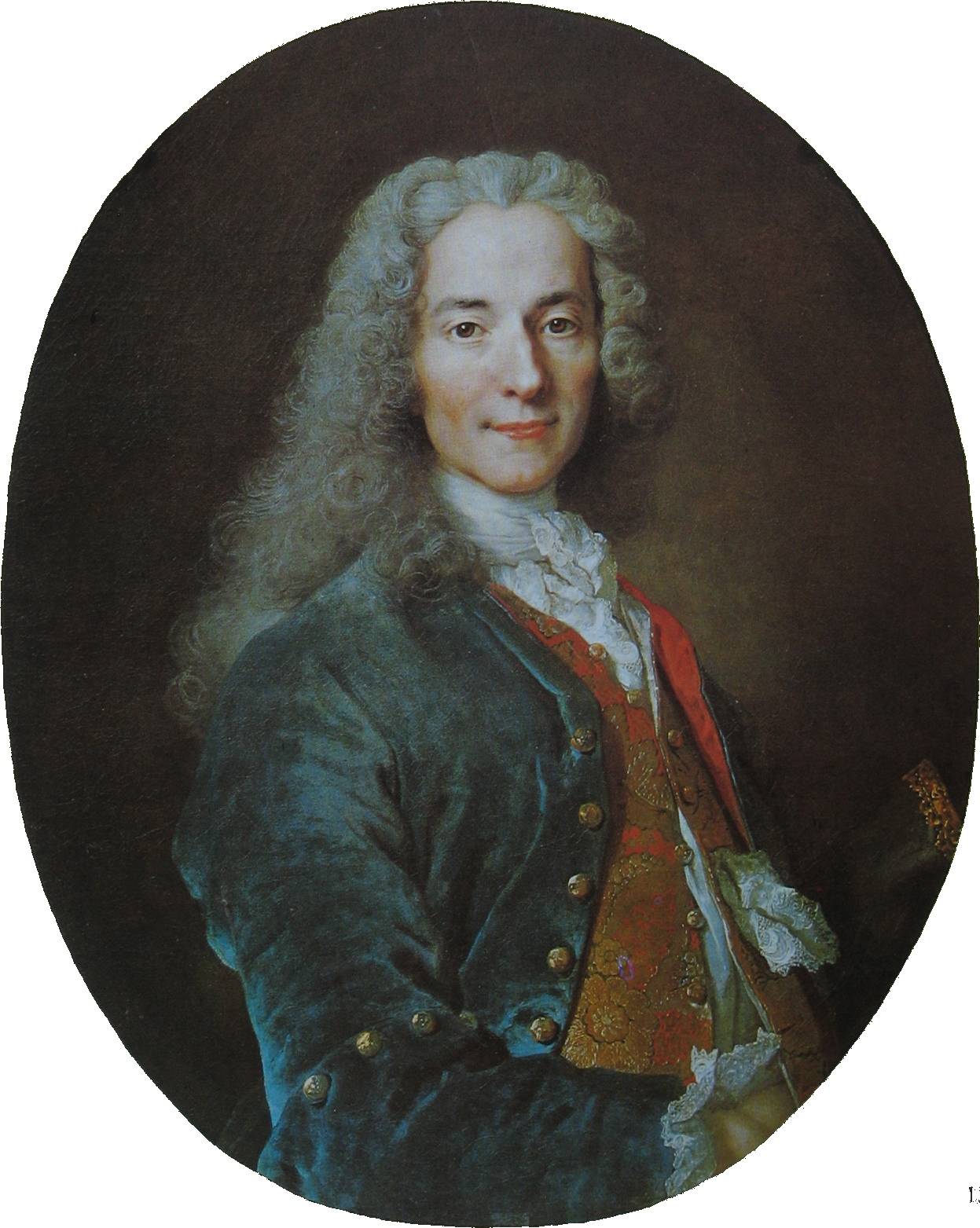
Portrait of Voltaire

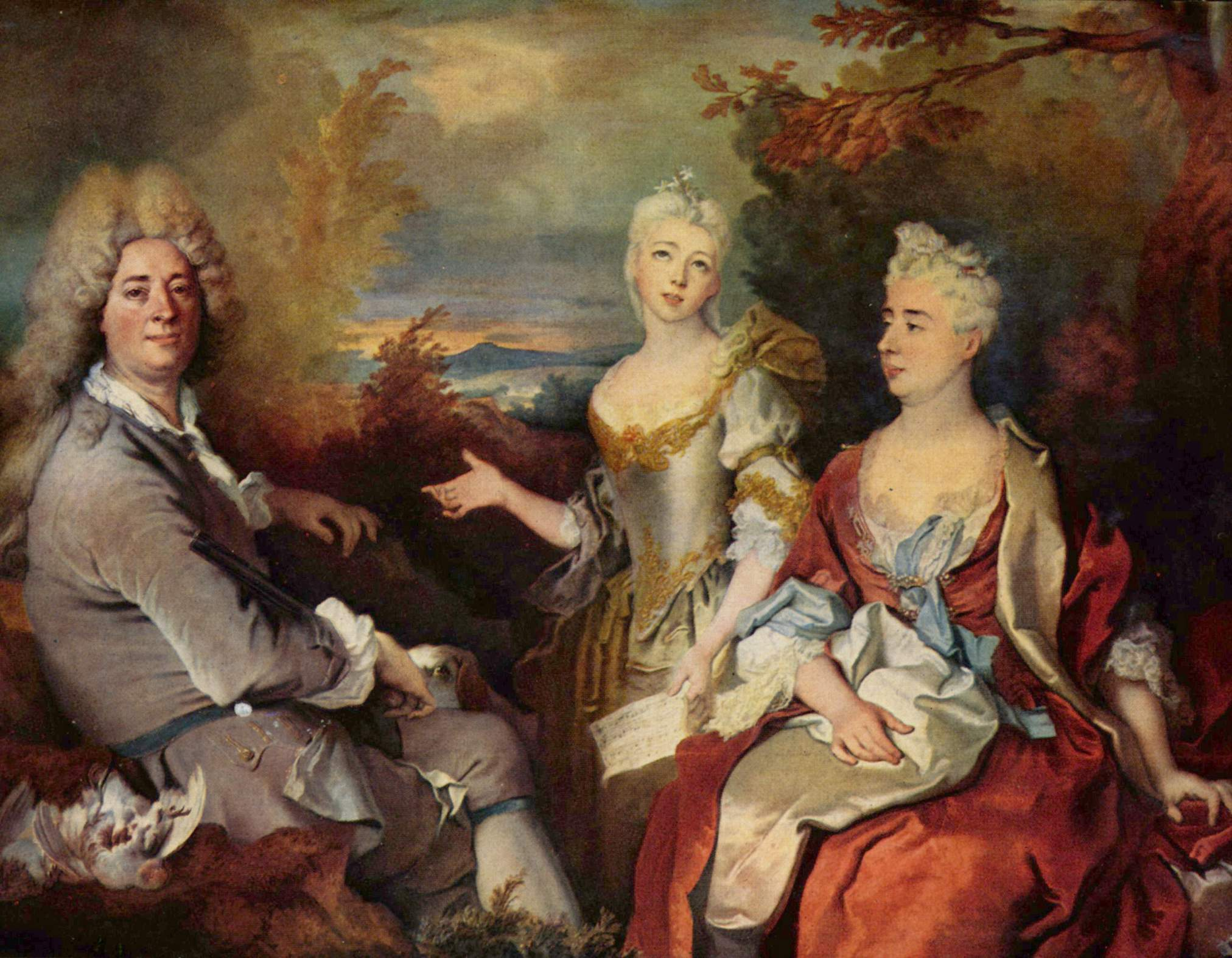
Self-portrait with family

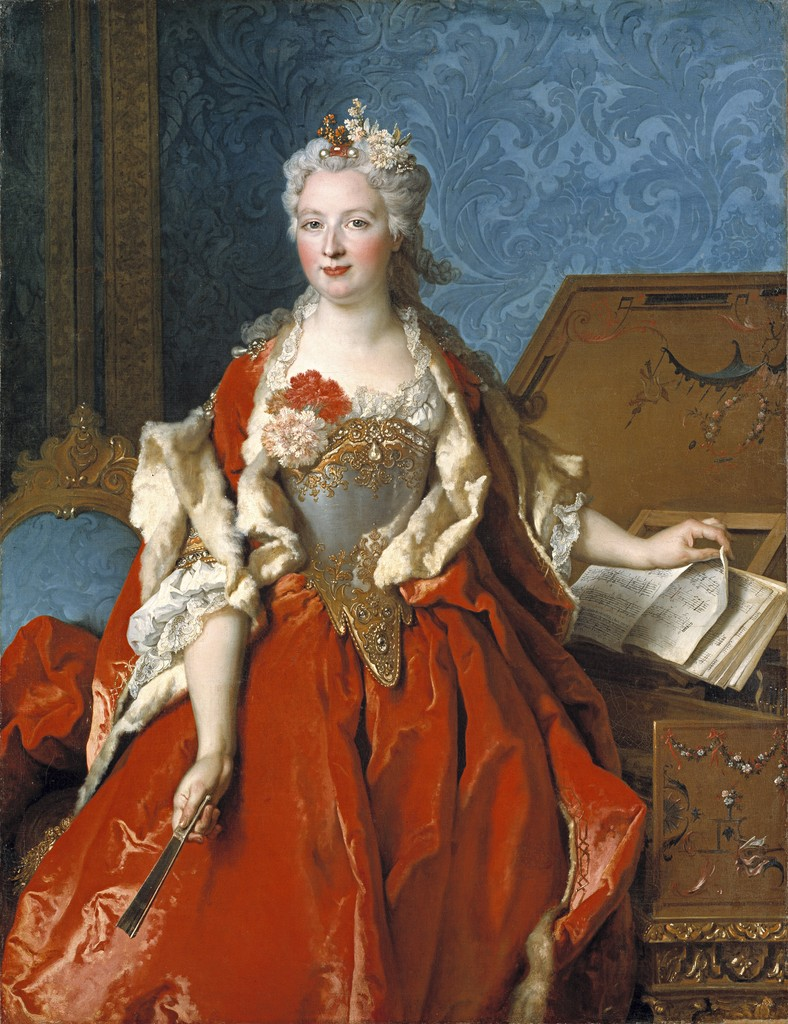
Portrait of Marguerite de Sève

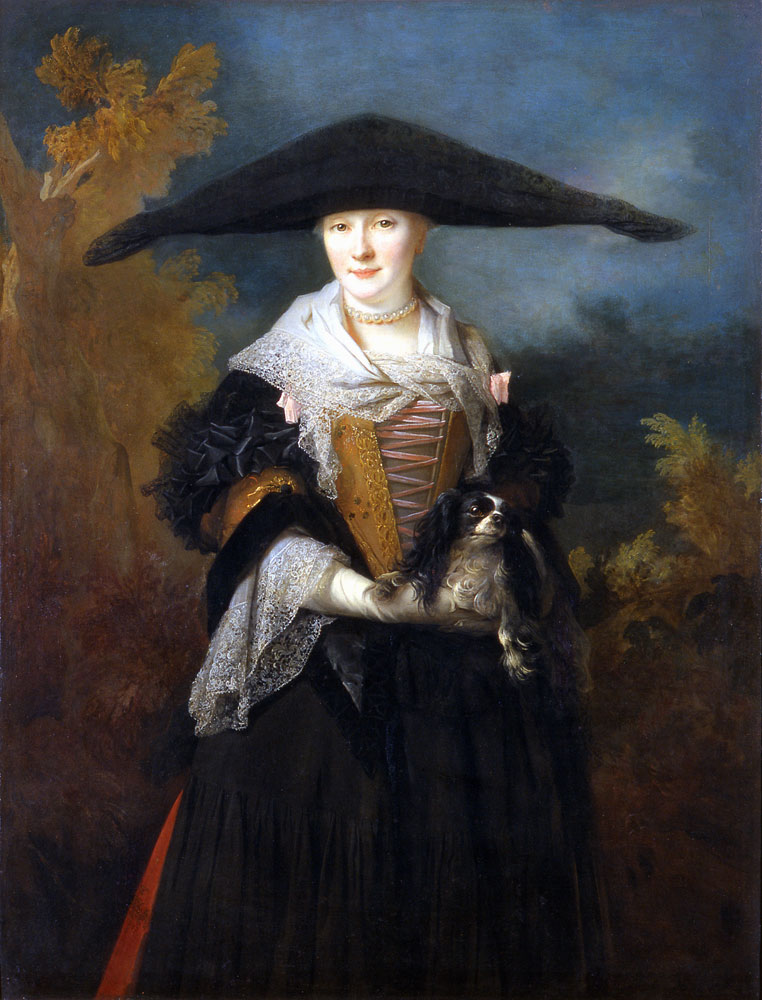
La belle Strasbourgeoise (1703)

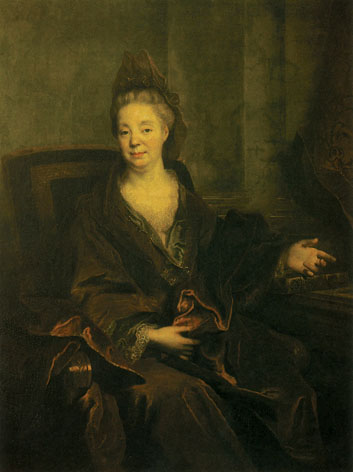
Portrait of Marguerite Bécaille

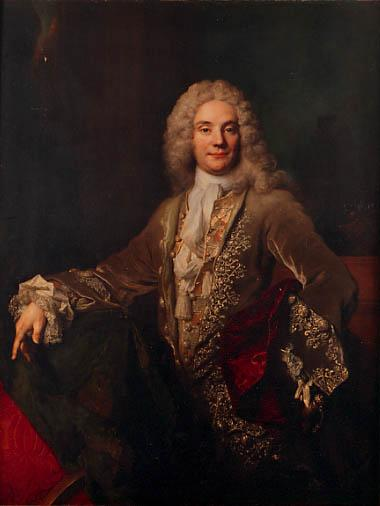
Portrait of Pierre-Joseph Titon de Cogny

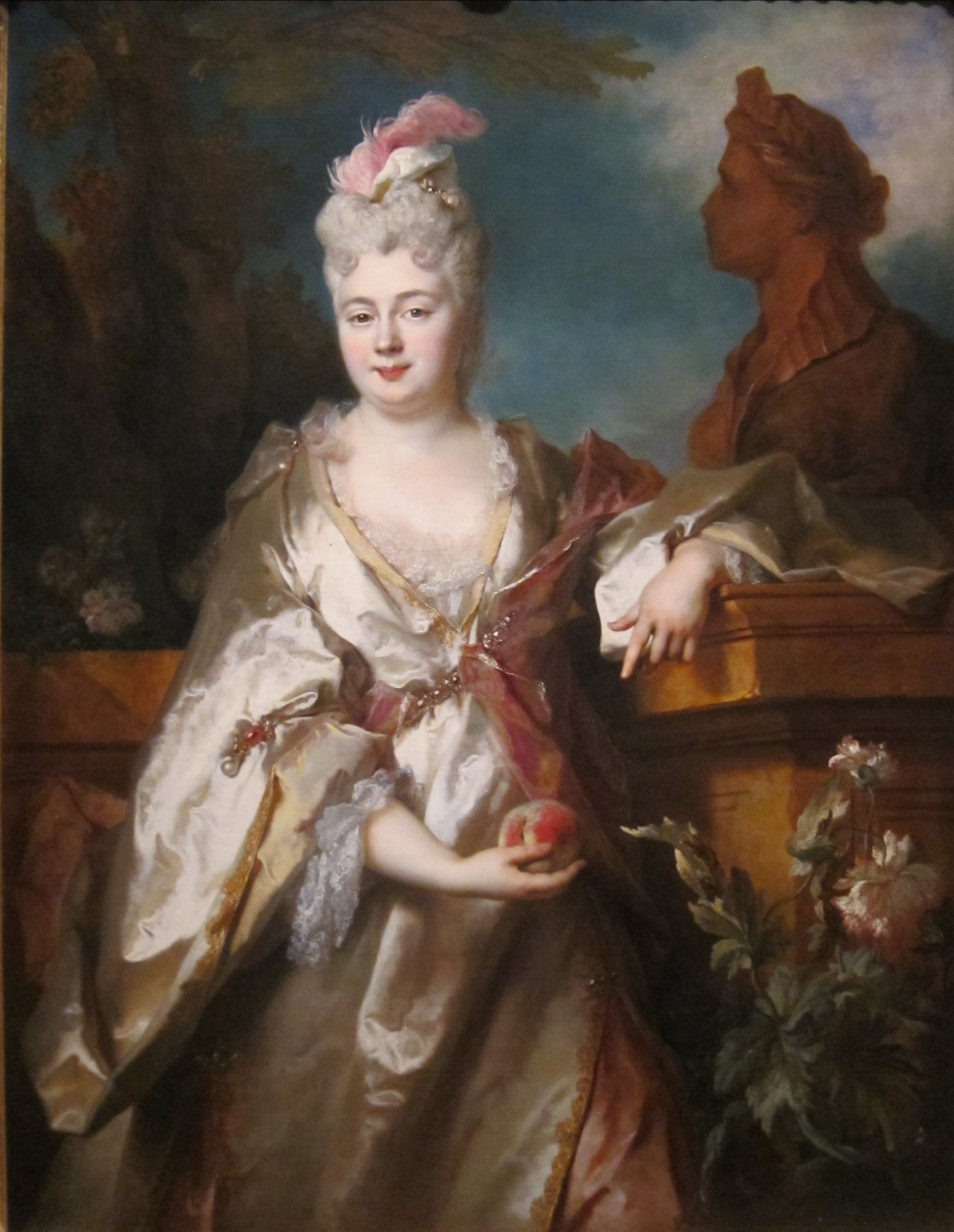
Portrait of Jeanne-Cécile Le Guay de Montgermon

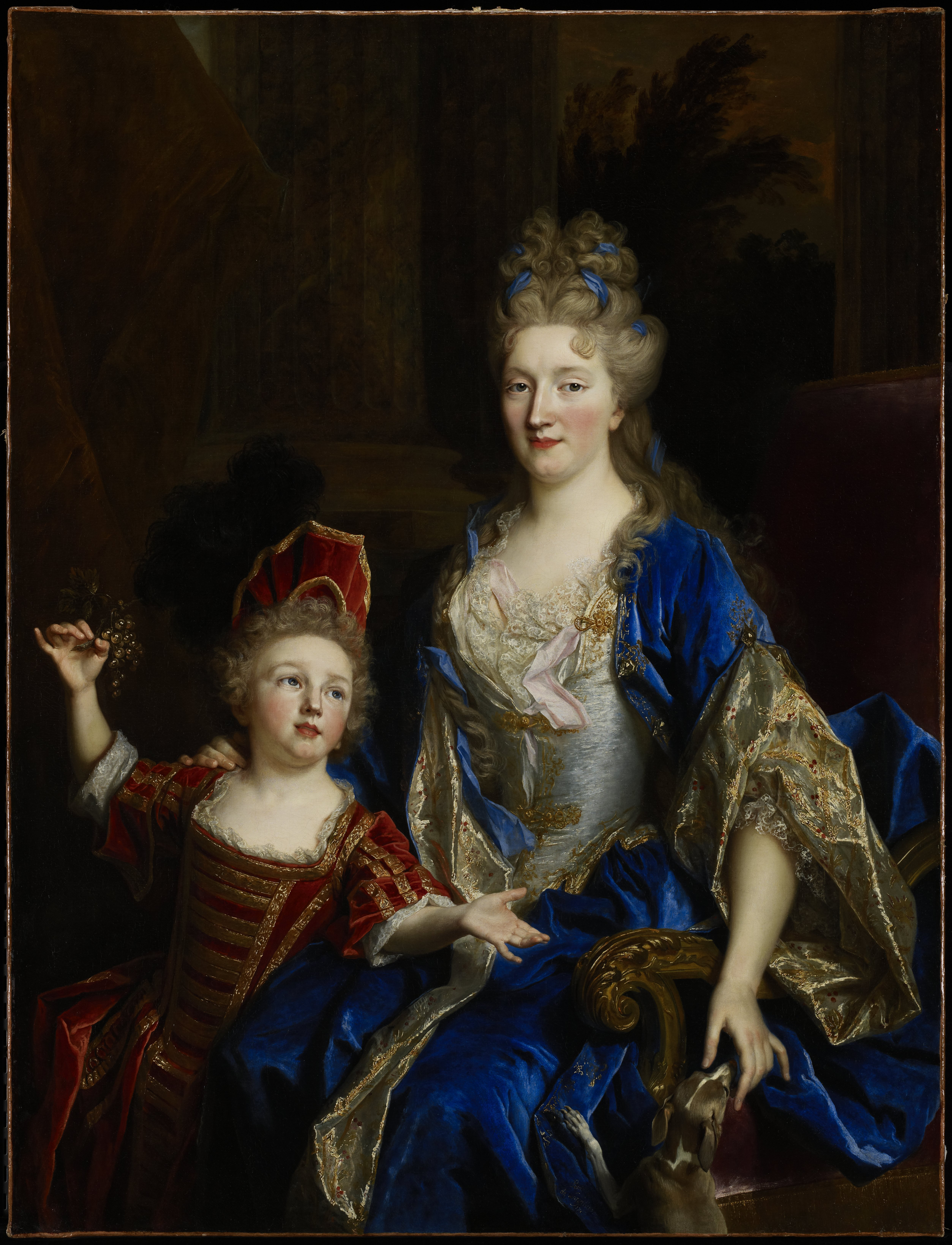
Portrait of Catherine Coustard with her son Léonor, Minneapolis Institute of Arts

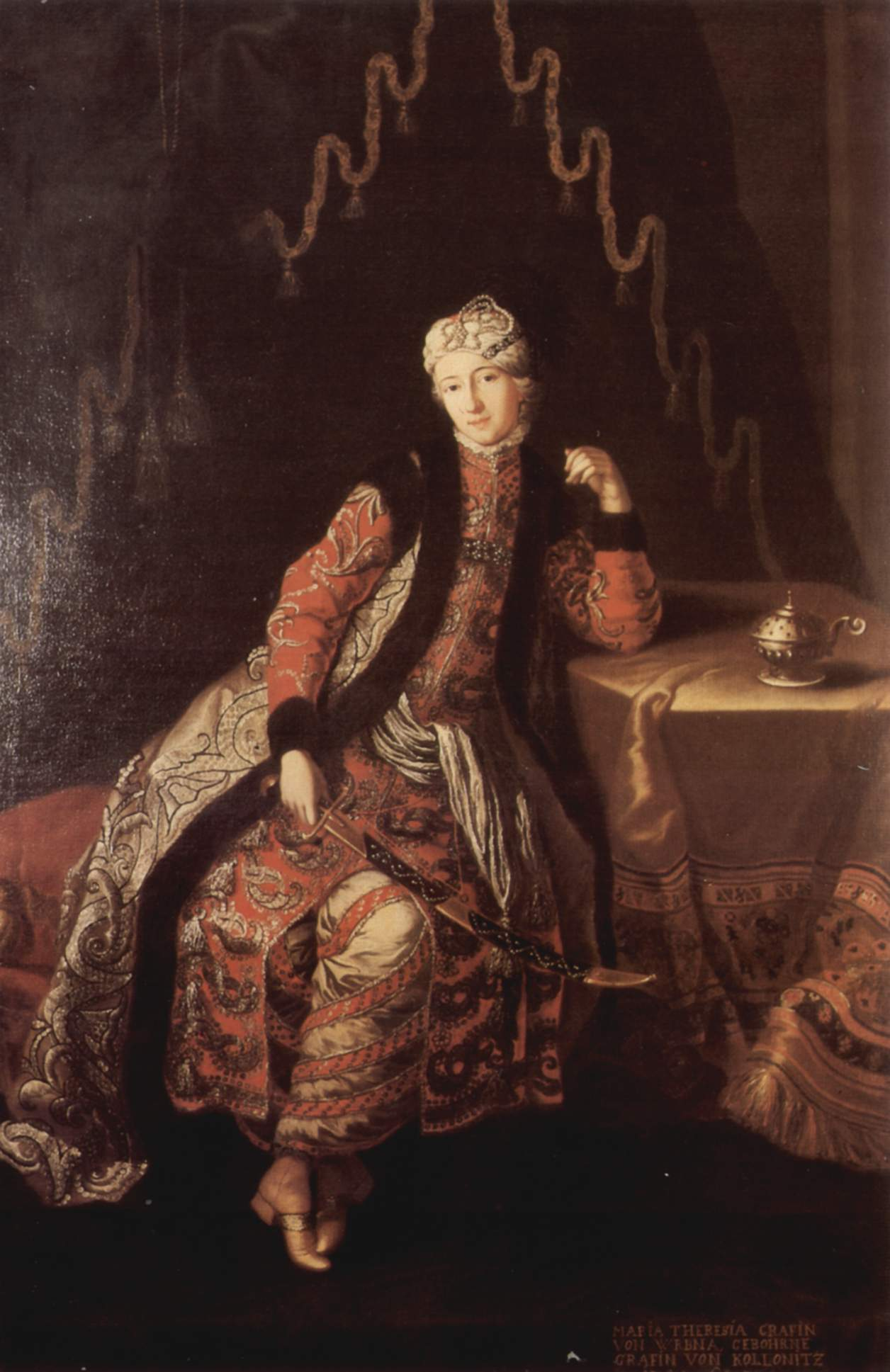
Portrait of Maria Theresia Countess of Wrbna born Countess of Kollonitz, often wrongly descripted as a portrait of French jeweller Jean-Baptiste Tavernier

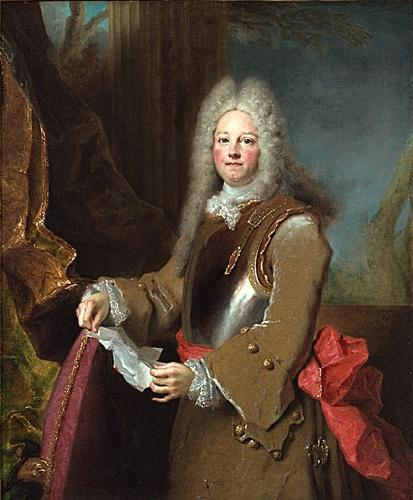
Portrait of an officer, oil on canvas, 1714–15, Art Gallery of New South Wales

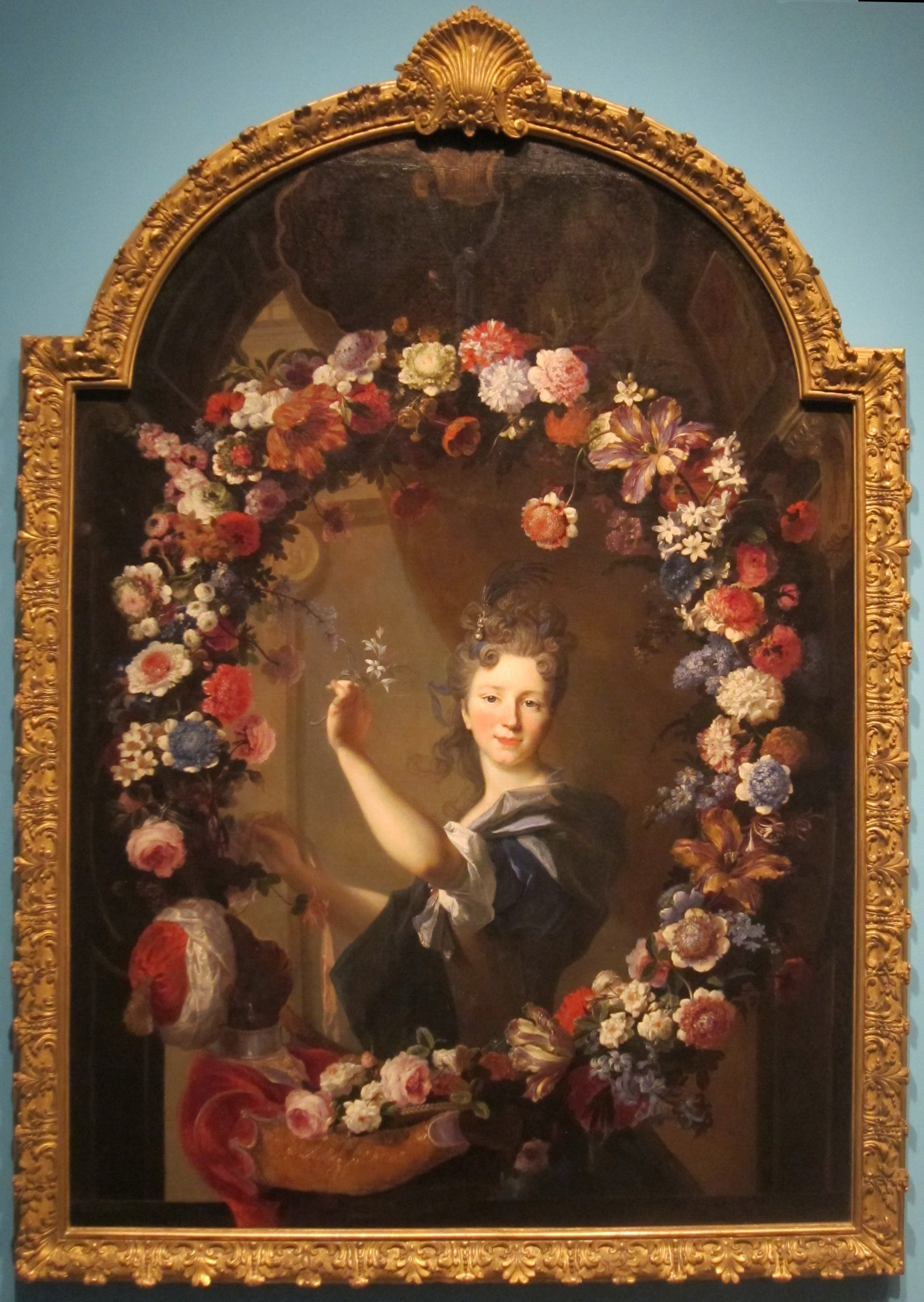
Oil on canvas portrait of Helene Lambert de Thorigny by Nicolas de Largillière (portrait) and Jean-Baptiste Belin (flowers), c. 1696–1700, 63 × 45 in., Honolulu Museum of Art

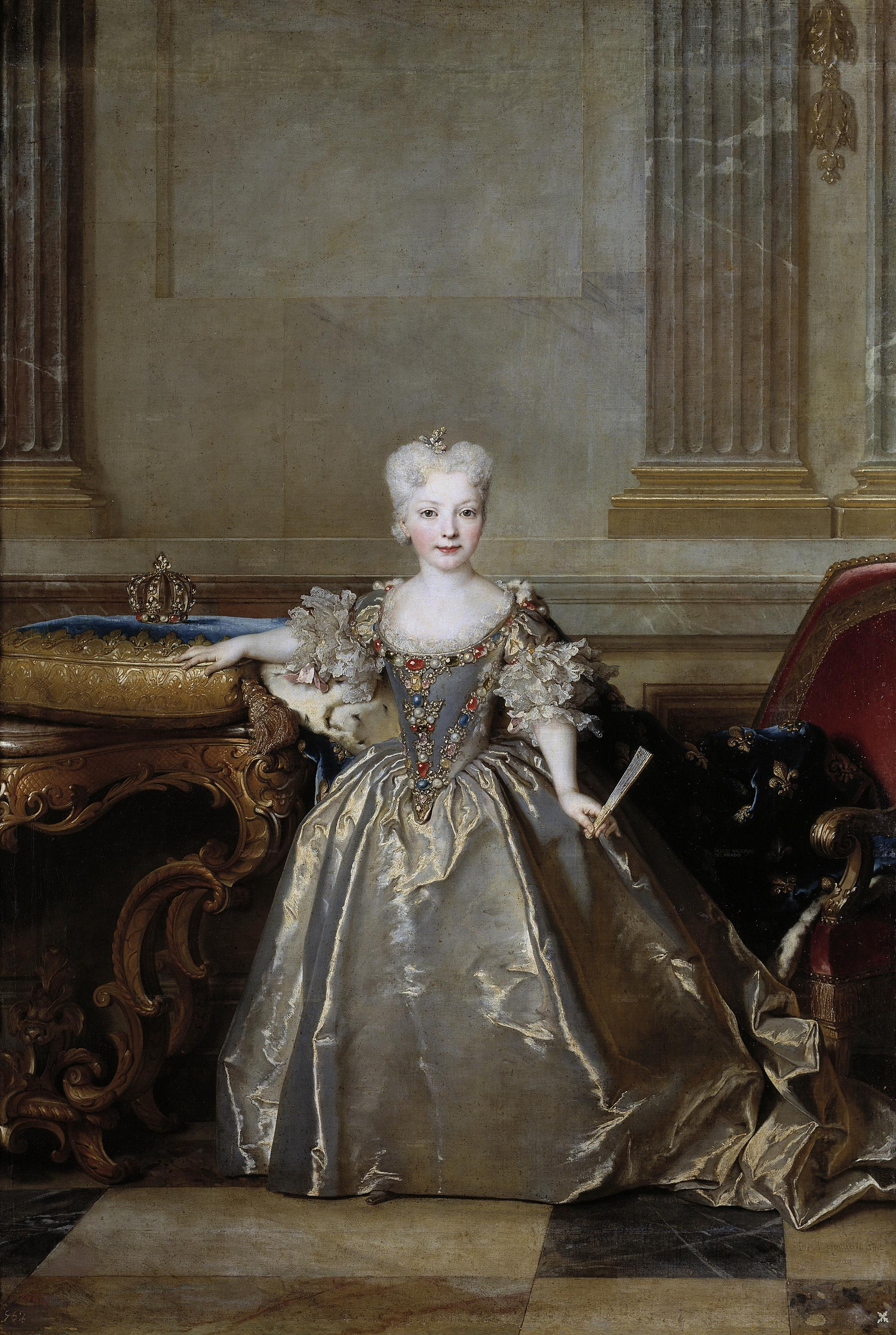
Infanta Mariana Victoria of Spain, one-time fiancée of Louis XV

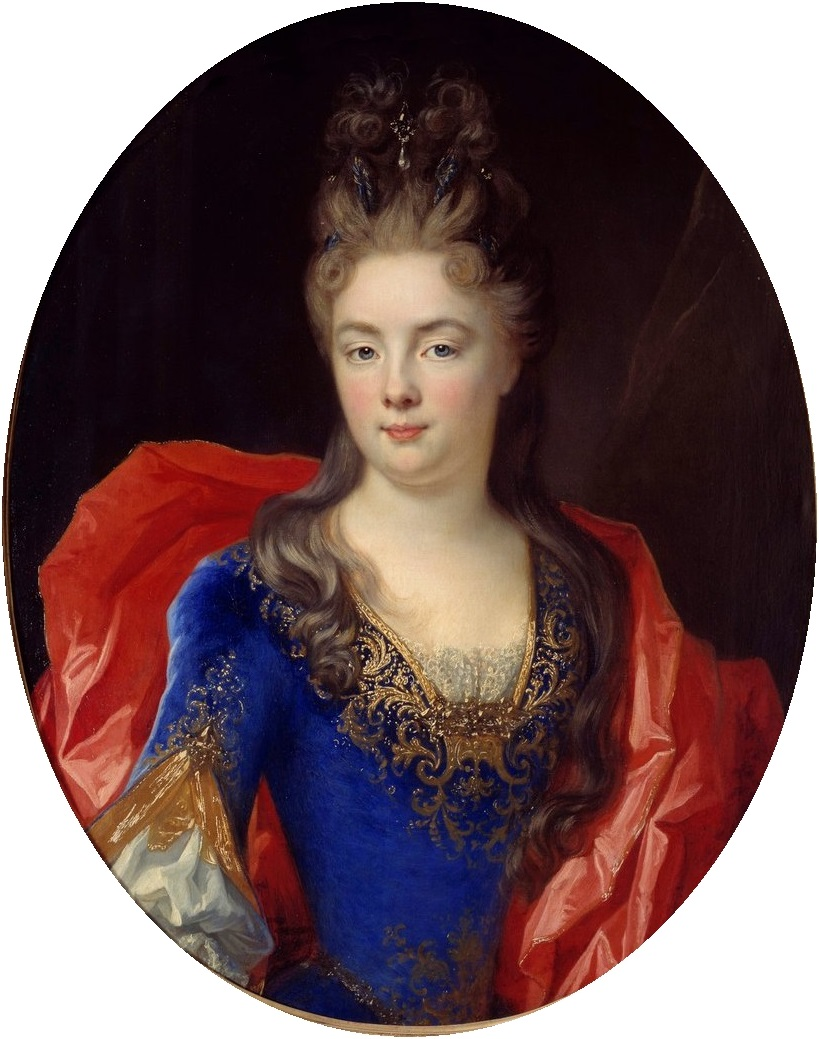
Anne Geneviève de Lévis, duchessede Rohan-Rohan by marriage and only daughter of Madame de Ventadour

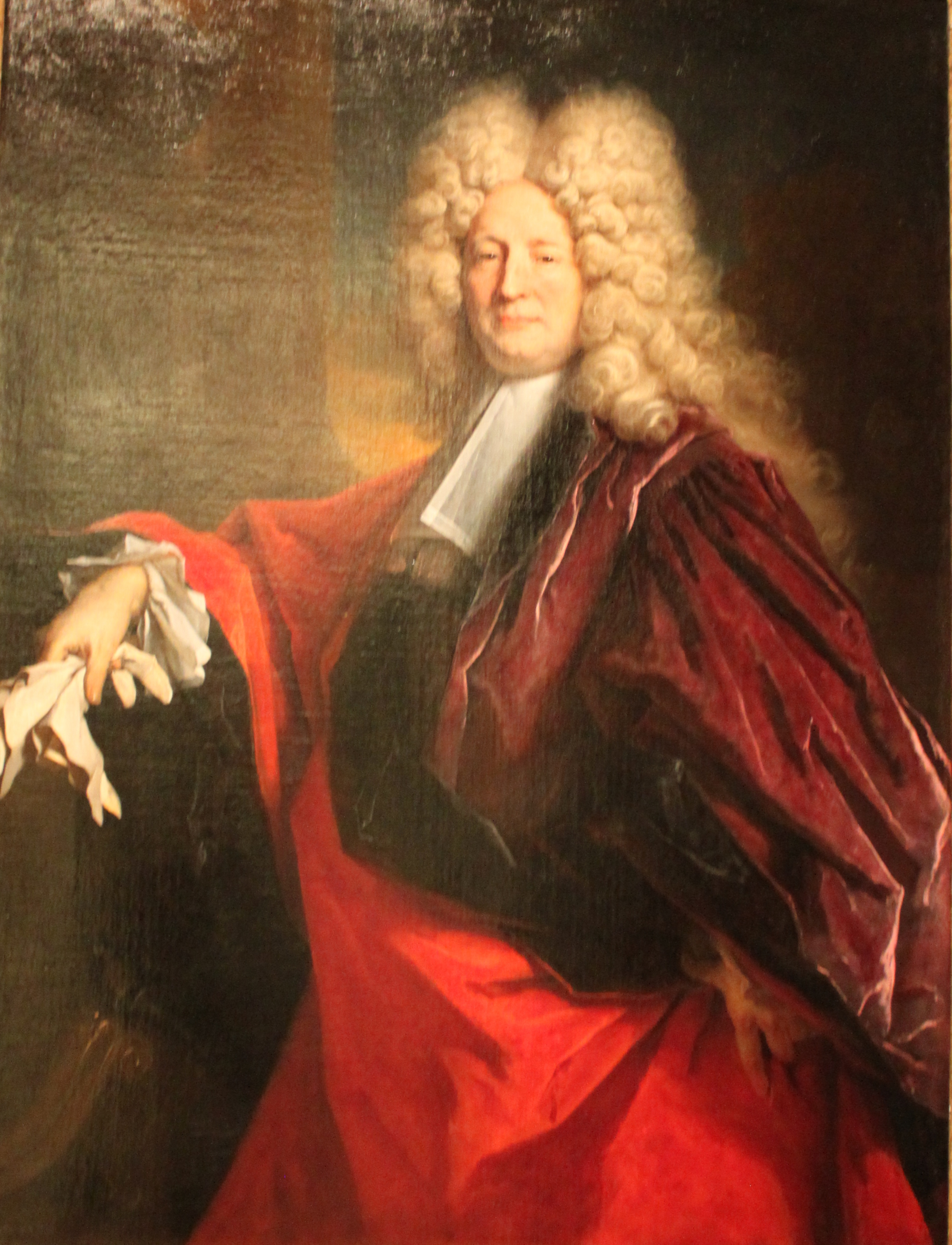
An Alderman of Paris, 1703, oil on canvas, The Detroit Institute of Arts

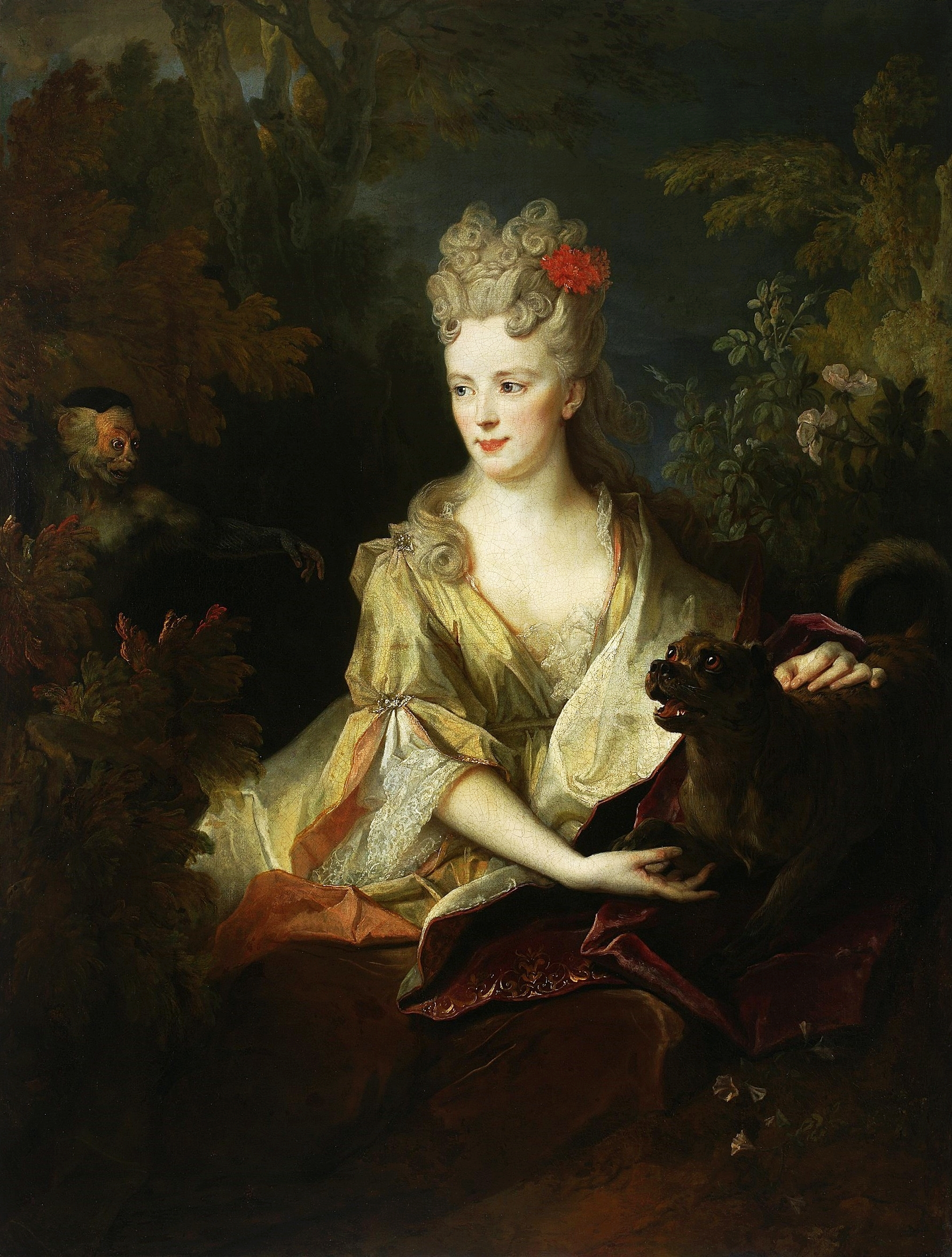
Portrait of a lady with a dog and a monkey (1700–1710)

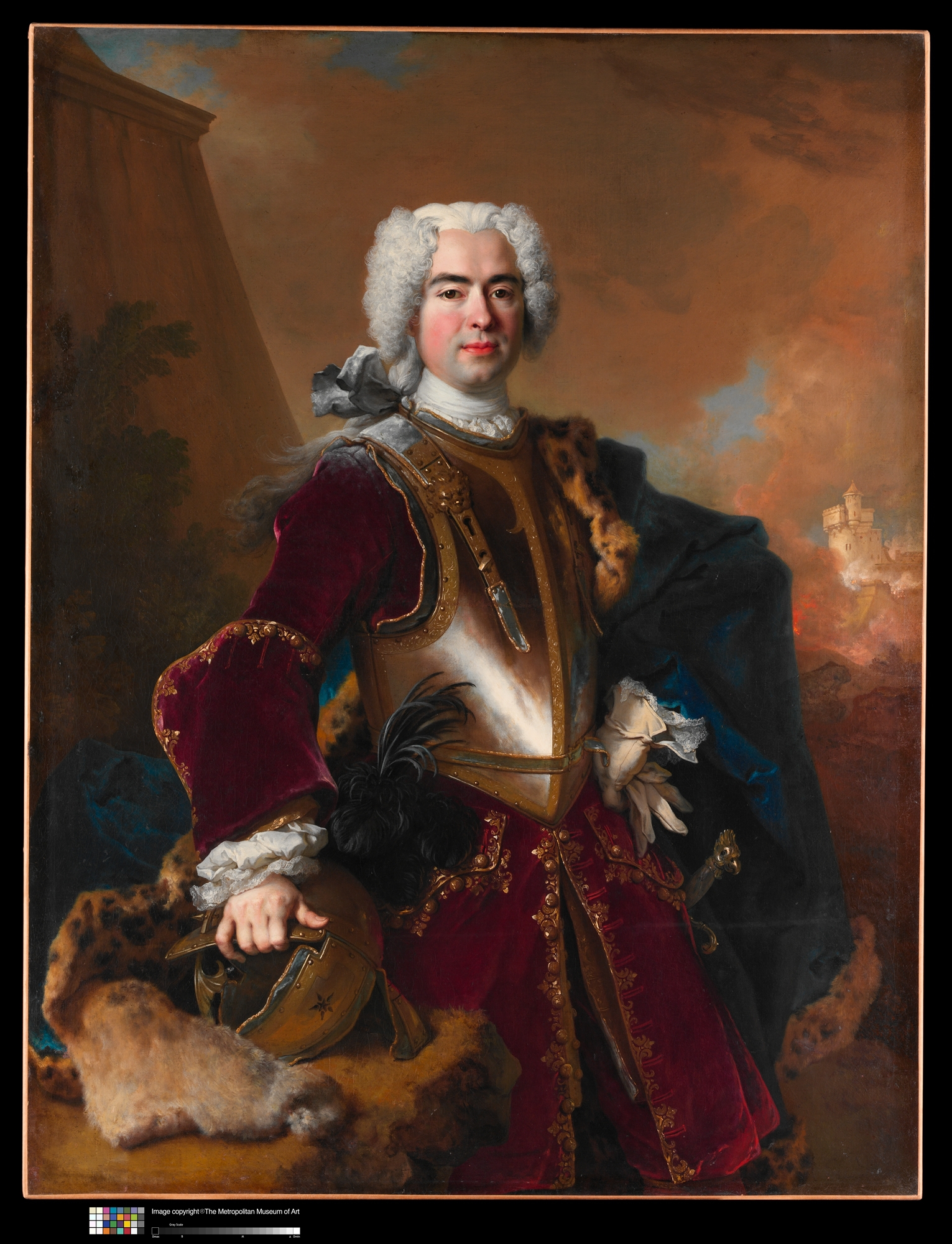
André François Alloys de Theys d'Herculais (1692–1779), in the Metropolitan Museum of Art

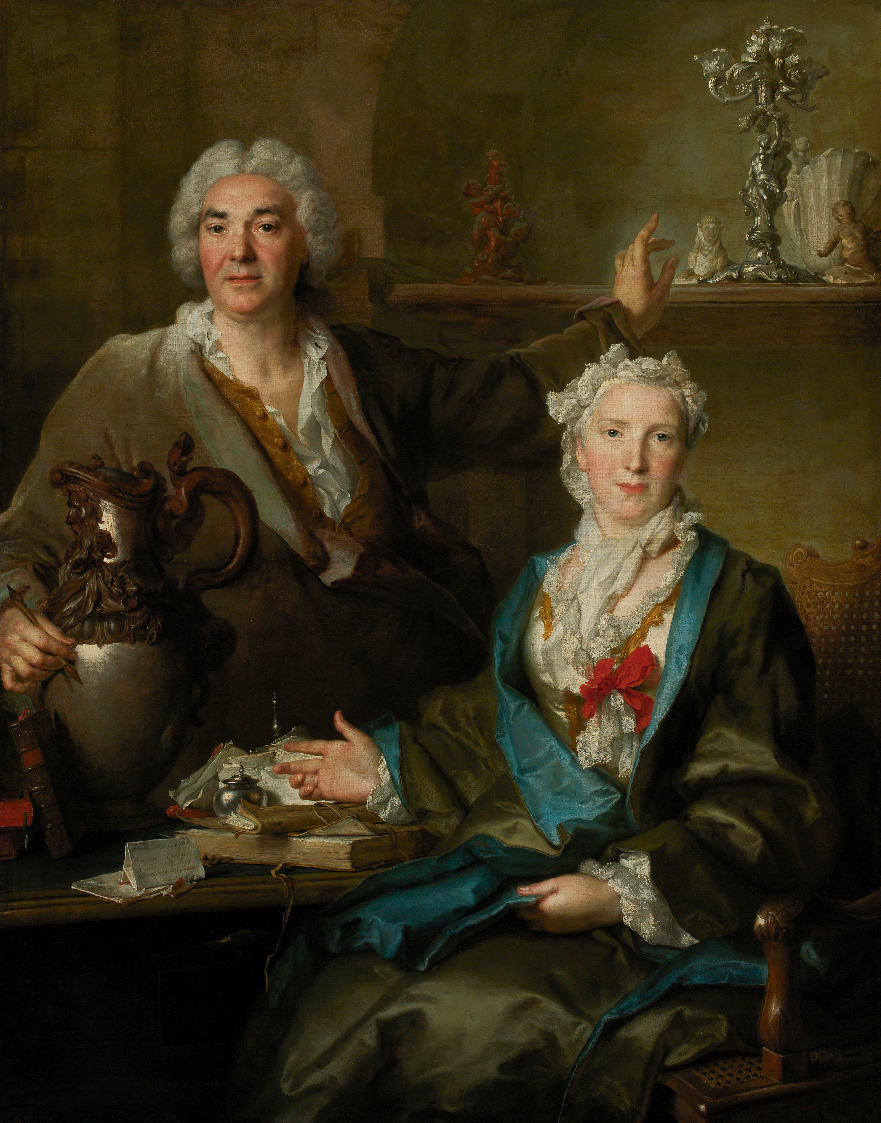
Portrait of Thomas Germain and his wife Anne-Denise Gauchelet in 1736

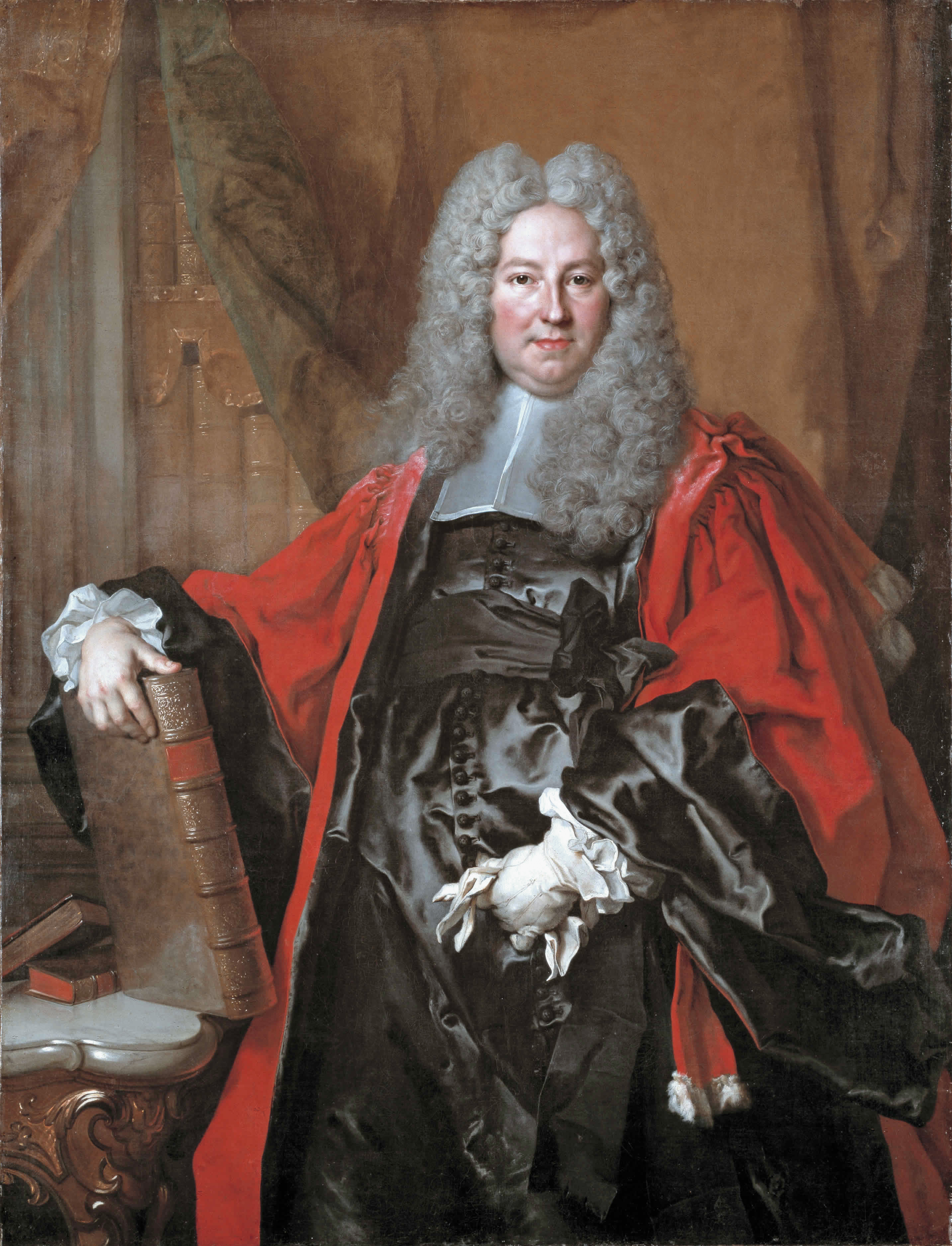
Portrait of Barthélemy-Jean-Claude Pupil, 1729, Timken Museum of Art, San Diego

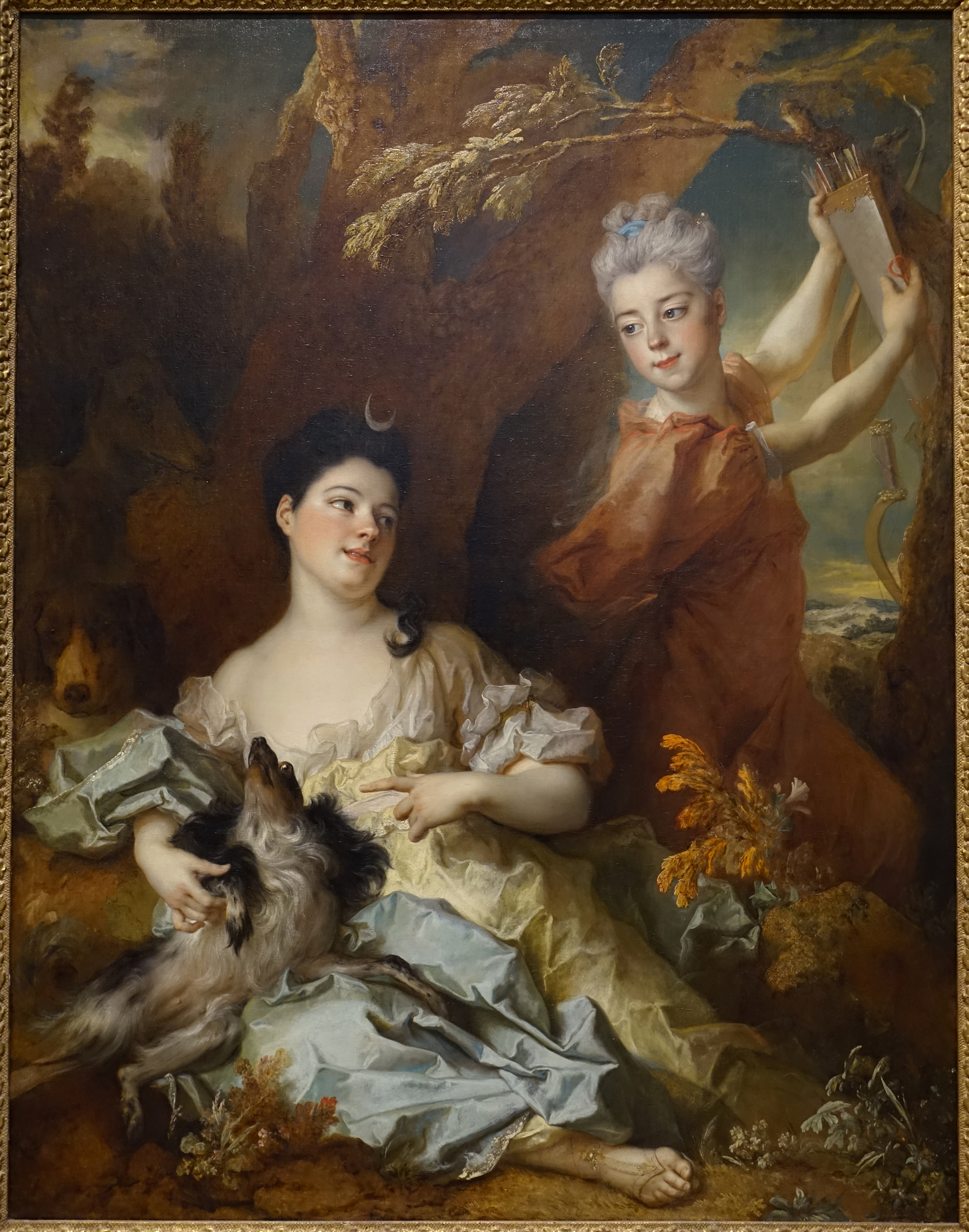
Portrait of the Comtesse de Montsoreau and her sister as Diana and an attendant, 1714, in the Dallas Museum of Art
