= Musée des Beaux-Arts de Strasbourg =

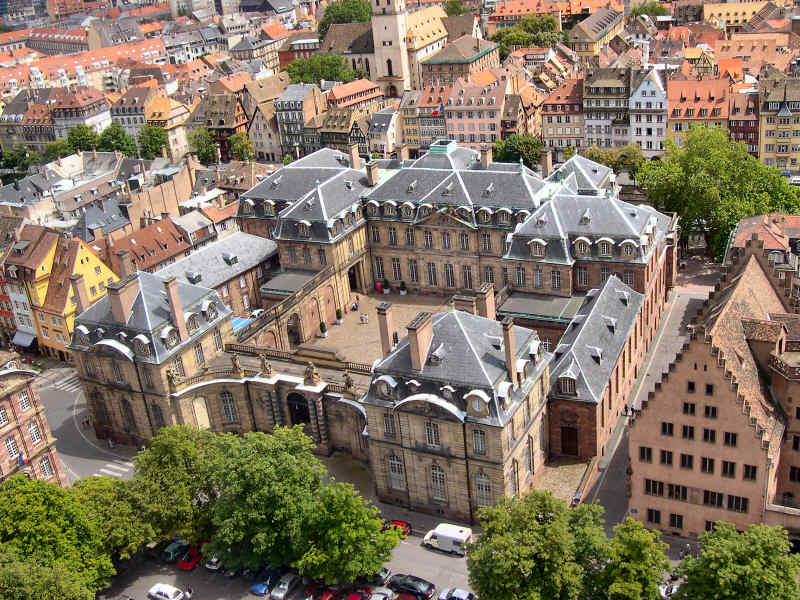

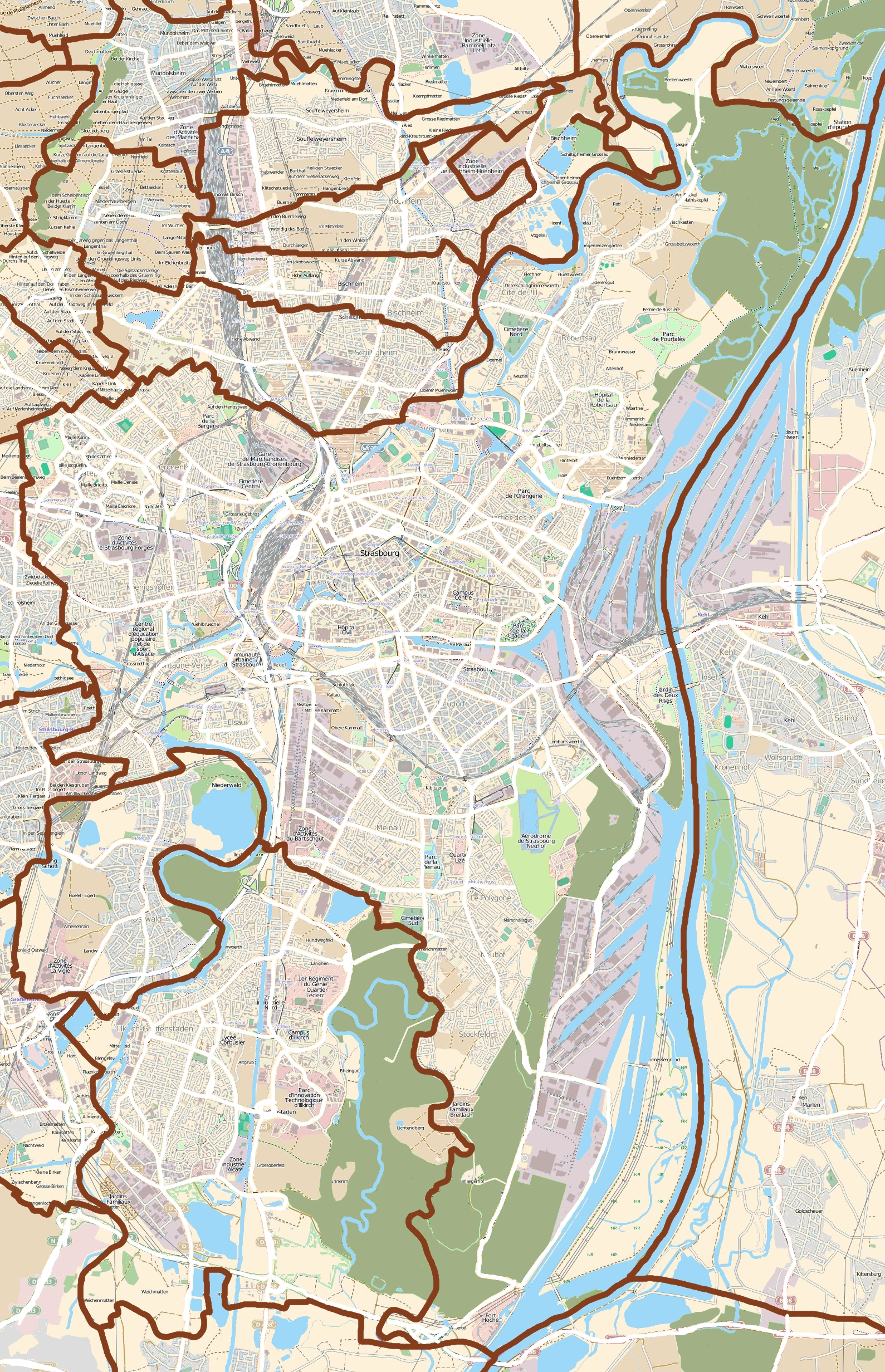
- Location within Strasbourg
- Established: 1890
- Coordinates: 48.581111°N 7.752222°E
- Type: Fine arts museum
- Collection size: paintings, sculptures
- Website: en.musees.strasbourg.eu/museum-of-fine-arts

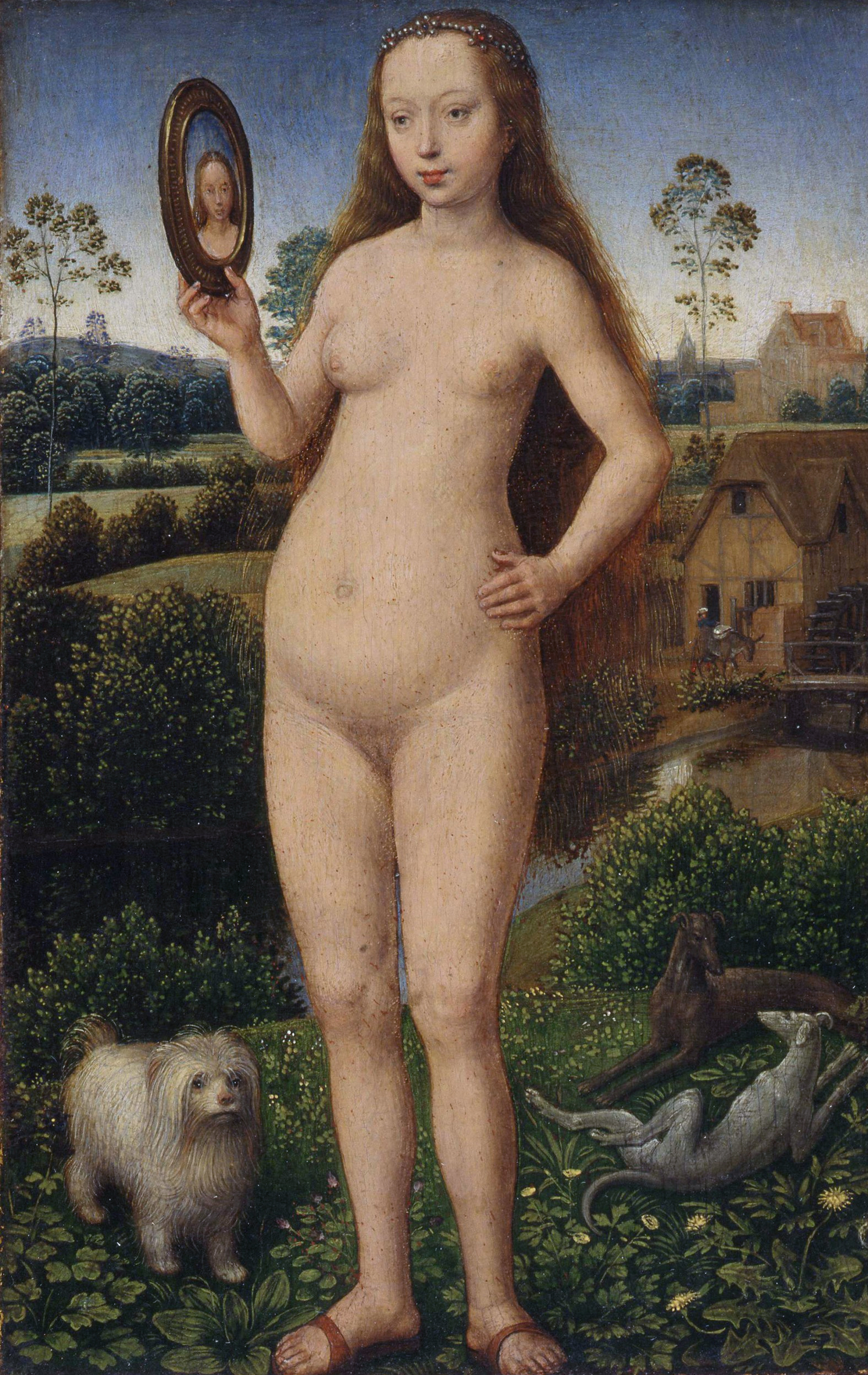
"Vanity, or Luxuria", by Hans Memling (detail from a polyptych)

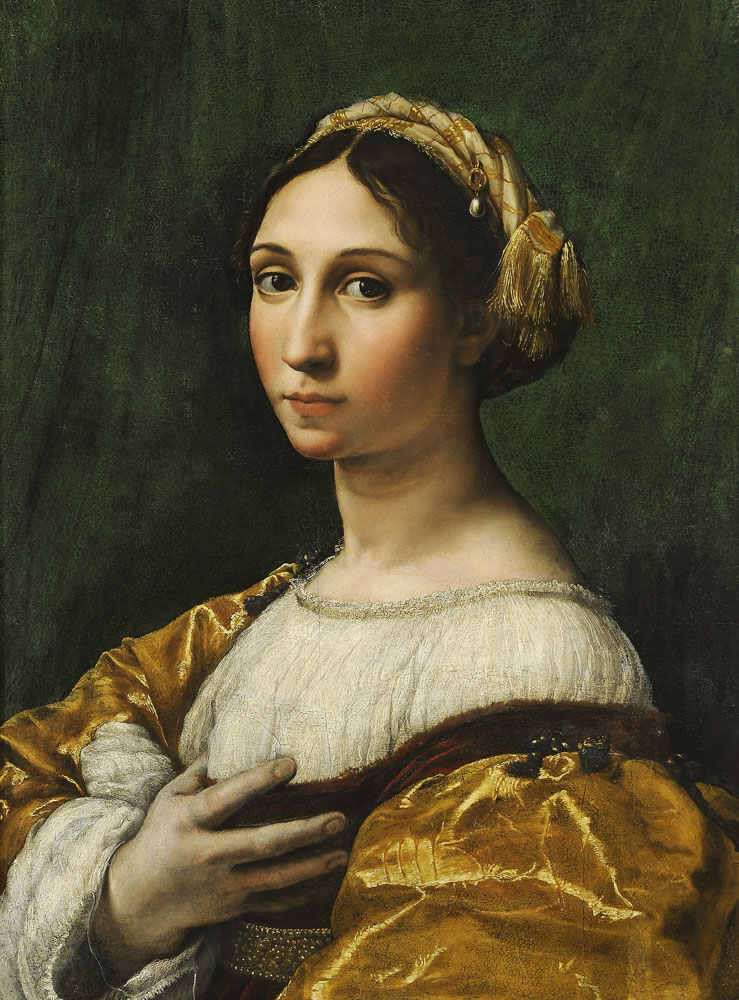
"Portrait of a young Lady", by Raphael and Giulio Romano

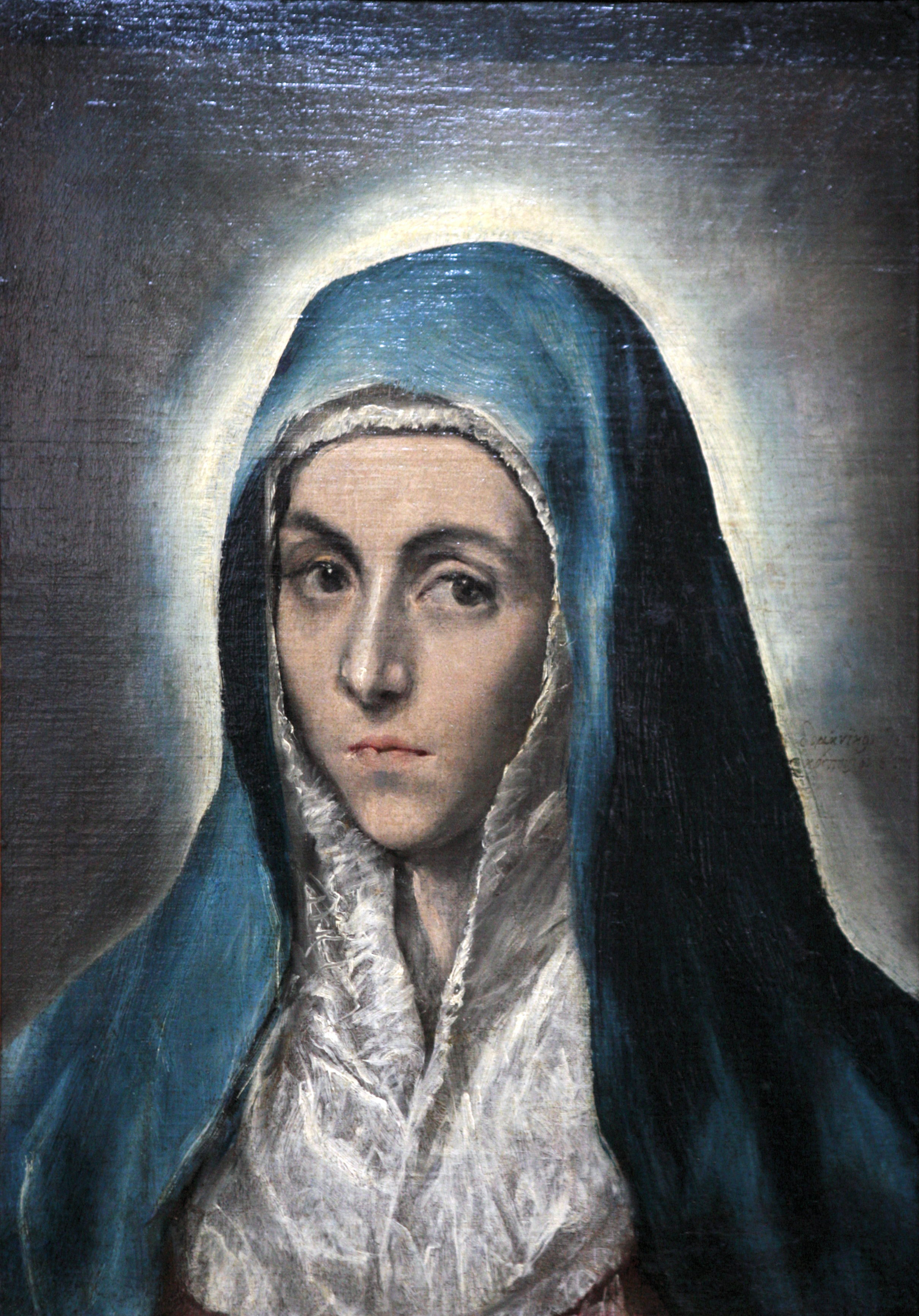
"Mater Dolorosa", by El Greco

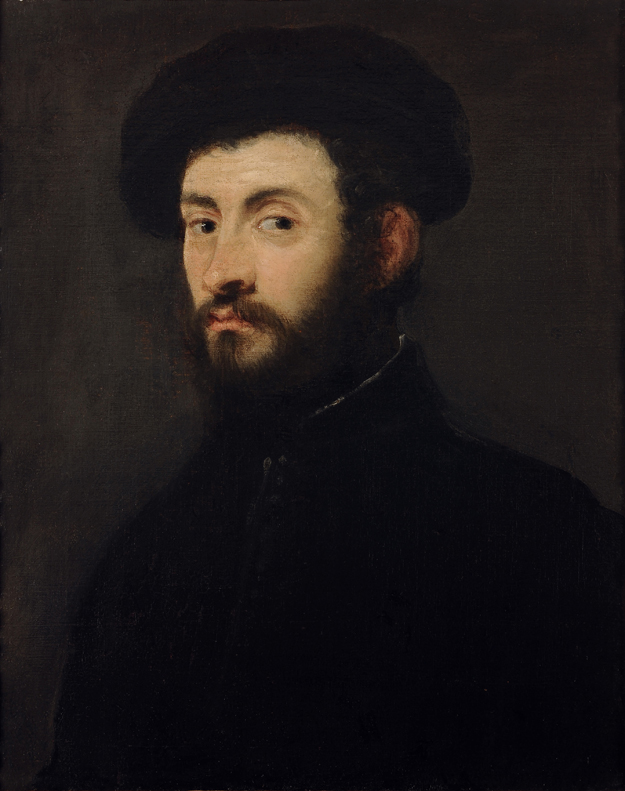
"Portrait of a bearded man" by Tintoretto

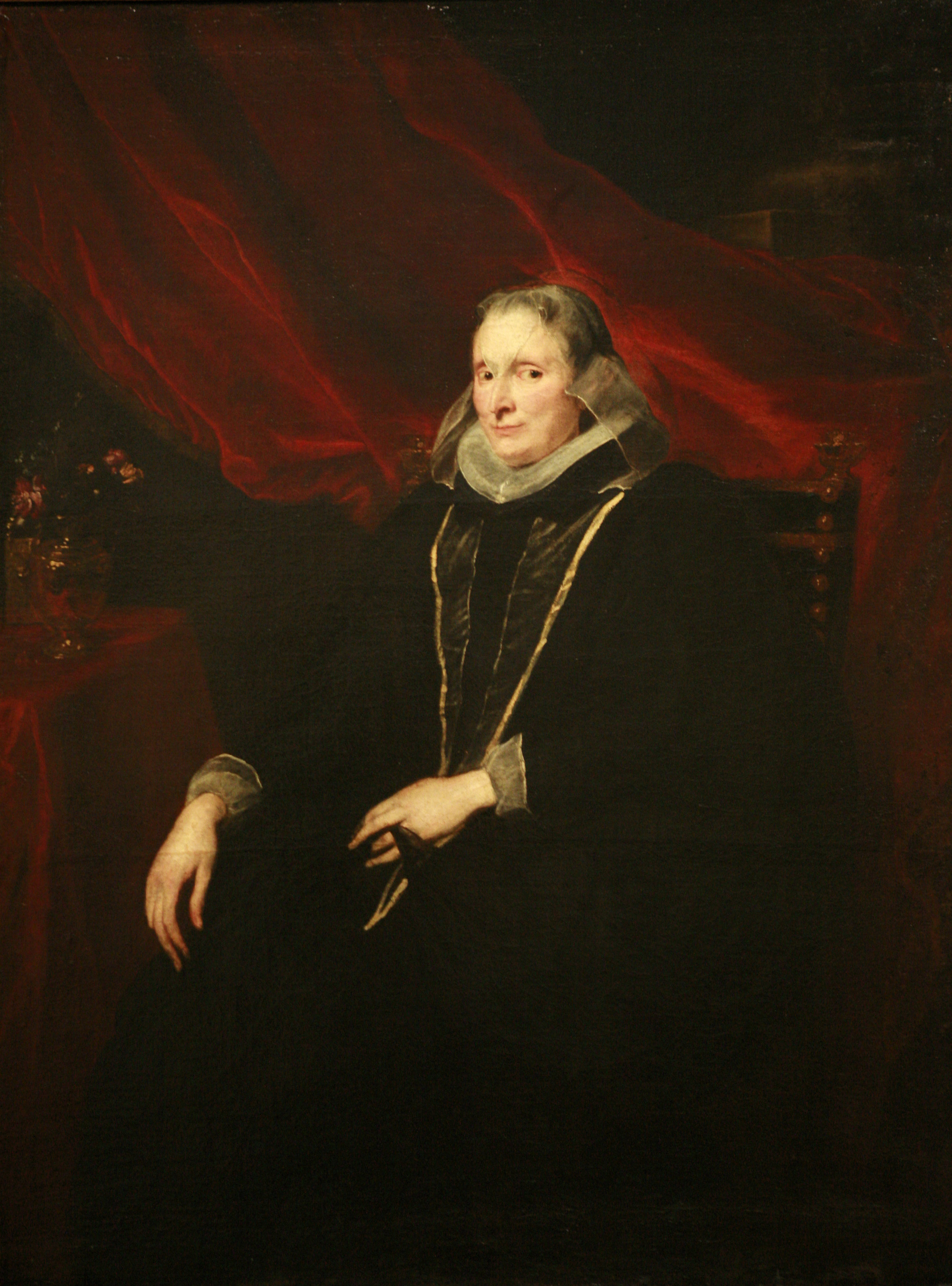
"Portrait of Luigia Cattaneo-Gentile" by Anthony van Dyck

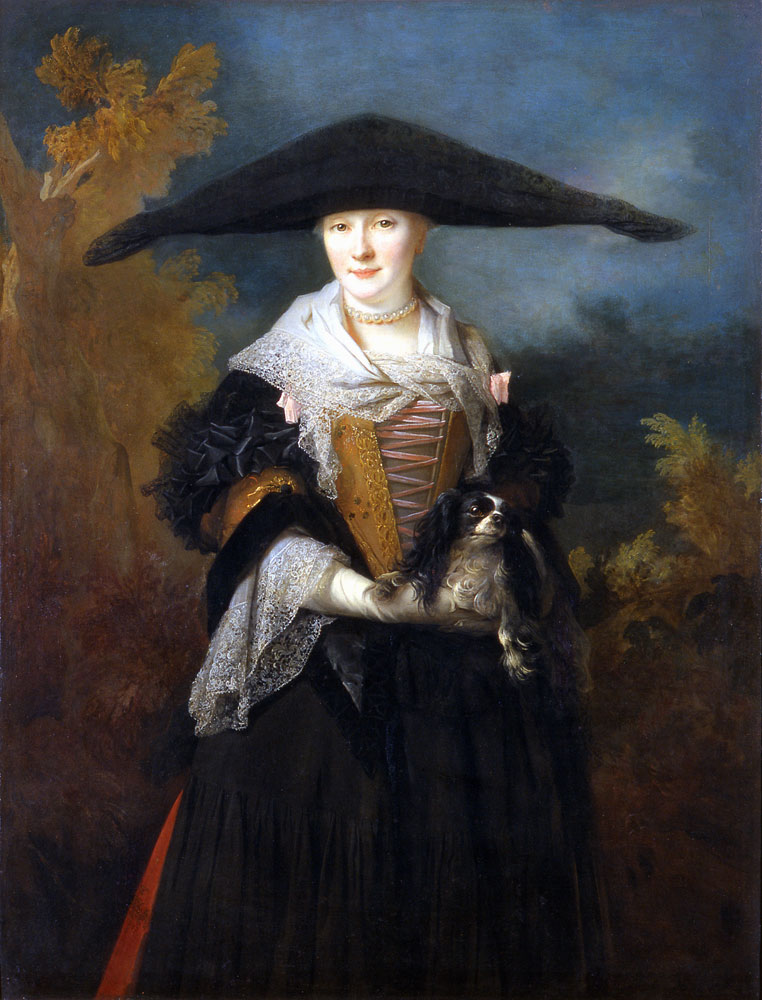
"The Beautiful Strasbourg Woman" by Nicolas de Largillière

The Musée des Beaux-Arts de Strasbourg (Museum of Fine Arts of Strasbourg) is the old masters paintings collection of the city of Strasbourg, located in the Alsace region of France. The museum is housed in the first and second floors of the baroque Palais Rohan since 1898. The museum displays works by non-Upper Rhenish artists from between the 14th century and 1871 and by Upper Rhenish artist from between 1681 and 1871. The museum owned 1,934 works as of 31 December 2015, this number has substantially increased since (see below). The old masters from the upper-Rhenish area until 1681 are exhibited in the neighboring Musée de l’Œuvre Notre-Dame.

== Historical overview ==
The first municipal art collection of the city of Strasbourg was the result of the French Revolution, and was a consequence of the expropriation of churches and cloisters. Through the years, the collection, which was founded in 1801, grew by private donations, as well as government loans from the inventory of the Louvre. On August 24, 1870, the museum, which was housed in the Aubette on Place Kléber, was set on fire by Prussian artillery fire and completely destroyed. After the end of the Franco-Prussian War, it was resolved to re-establish the museum, and the imperial art historian Wilhelm von Bode was commissioned with the task in 1889. In 1890, the museum was launched and was re-stocked since that time by acquisitions and gifts. In 1931 under the leadership of Hans Haug (1890–1965), the collection of medieval art and upper-Rhenish painting (Konrad Witz, Hans Baldung, Sebastian Stoskopff) was transferred to the newly founded Musée de l’Œuvre Notre-Dame. The collection of modern art went to the Musée d’Art Moderne et Contemporain de Strasbourg (Museum of Modern and Contemporary Art of Strasbourg). Haug's superior during the German occupation from 1940 to 1944 was Kurt Martin.

On August 13, 1947, fire destroyed part of the re-established collection, including works by Francesco Guardi, Thomas de Keyser, Antonio del Pollaiuolo and Lucas Cranach the Elder. However, with the money from the insurance, it was possible to acquire other artistically valuable paintings. Apart from regular purchases on the art market, the collection of the museum is also regularly being expanded by substantial donations, notably in 1987 and 1994 by collectors Othon Kaufman and François Schlageter (Italian paintings), in 2004 by collectors Roger and Elisabeth Eisenbeth (Dutch paintings), in 2009 by the collector Ann L. Oppenheimer (Italian, Flemish and Dutch paintings), and in 2019 by the collectors Jeannine Poitrey and Marie-Claire Ballabio (mostly Italian and Dutch paintings).

In 2005 the museum reached a settlement with the heirs of Bernhard Altmann over a Canaletto that had been looted by the Nazis from its Jewish owner.

== Painters exhibited (selected) ==
=== Italian ===
Giotto di Bondone
Sano di Pietro
Sandro Botticelli
Cima da Conegliano
Carlo Crivelli
Filippino Lippi
Piero di Cosimo
Cima da Conegliano
Raphael
Correggio
Veronese
Tintoretto
Guercino
Canaletto
Giambattista Tiepolo
Salvator Rosa
Alessandro Magnasco
Giuseppe Maria Crespi

=== Flemish and Dutch ===
Simon Marmion
Hans Memling
Lucas van Leyden
Gerard David
Maarten van Heemskerck
Peter Paul Rubens
Jacob Jordaens
Salomon van Ruysdael
Pieter de Hooch
Anthony van Dyck
Willem Kalf
Pieter Claesz
Christiaen van Couwenbergh
Cornelis Engelsz

=== Spanish ===
Jusepe de Ribera
Francisco de Zurbarán
Francisco de Goya

=== Greek ===
El Greco

=== French ===
Philippe de Champaigne
Claude Lorrain
Nicolas de Largillière
François Boucher
Simon Vouet
Antoine Watteau
Jean Siméon Chardin
Philip James de Loutherbourg
Jean-Baptiste-Camille Corot
Théodore Chassériau
Gustave Courbet
Théodore Rousseau
Edgar Degas
Charles-Eduard Chaise

== Sculptors exhibited ==
Baccio Bandinelli
Alessandro Algardi
Alessandro Vittoria
François Girardon
Jean-Antoine Houdon
Jean-Baptiste Carpeaux
Antoine-Louis Barye
Théodore-Charles Gruyère
François Joseph Bosio
Adolf von Hildebrand

== See also ==
- Category:Paintings in the Musée des Beaux-Arts de Strasbourg

== Bibliography ==
- Le musée des Beaux-Arts de Strasbourg - Cinq siècles de peinture, Éditions des Musées de Strasbourg, May 2006, ISBN 2-901833-78-0 in French
- Peintures flamandes et hollandaises du Musée des Beaux-Arts de Strasbourg, Éditions des Musées de Strasbourg, February 2009, ISBN 978-2-35125-030-3
- Les Peintures italiennes du Musée des Beaux-Arts, xvie, xviie et xviiie siècles, Éditions Le Seuil, 1996, ISBN 978-2-901833-30-7
- Les Primitifs italiens du Musée des Beaux-Arts de Strasbourg, Éditions Le Seuil, 1993, ISBN 978-2-901833-14-7
