= Portrait of a Young Woman (Raphael, Strasbourg) =

Painting by Raphael and Giulio Romano

Portrait of a young Woman
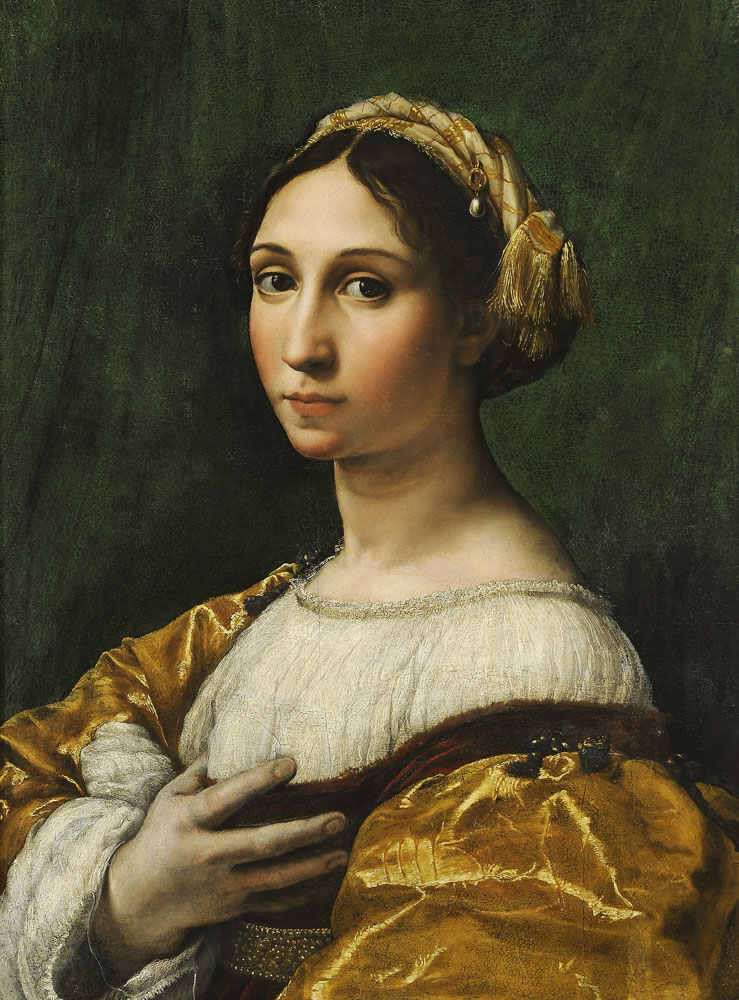
- Artist: Raphael; Giulio Romano
- Year: between 1516 and 1520
- Medium: oil on panel (poplar)
- Movement: Portrait painting Italian Renaissance; Cinquecento
- Subject: A young brunette woman at bust length
- Dimensions: 60 cm × 44 cm (24 in × 17 in)
- Location: Musée des Beaux-Arts, Strasbourg
- Accession: 1890

Portrait of a Young Woman is a c.1518-1519 oil on panel painting by Raphael and Giulio Romano, now in the Musée des Beaux-Arts in Strasbourg, for which it was acquired by Wilhelm von Bode, who bought it in London in 1890. It was previously recorded in London in the Acton collection. Its inventory number is 175.

== Authorship ==
Traditionally attributed to the School of Raphael, the removal of 19th-century repainting and X-ray examination have shown that the hand, sleeves and chemise were later additions. The most widely accepted hypothesis is that Giulio Romano painted the head, neck and bust after a design by Raphael, and that Raphael then added the hand and the sleeves, and covered the young woman's cleavage. The identity of the sitter remains unknown; although there is a typological likeness, she is not the same person as La Fornarina: her nose, for instance, has a different shape.

== See also ==
- List of paintings by Raphael
