= Jacques-Antoine Arlaud =

Genevan miniature painter

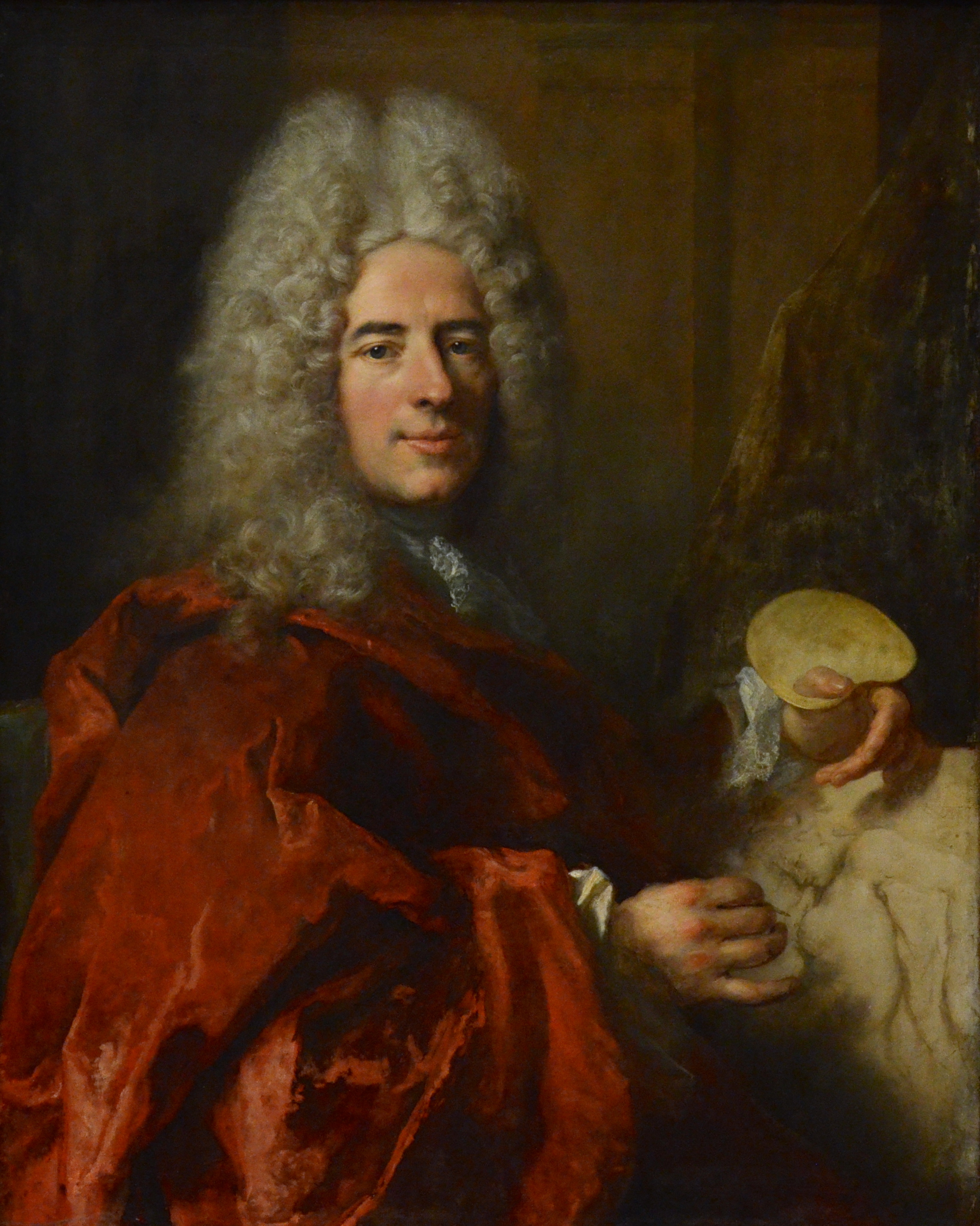
Portrait by Nicolas de Largillière, 1714

Jacques Antoine Arlaud (1668–1743) was a Genevan miniature painter.

== Life ==
Arlaud was born in Geneva in 1668. His father was a watchmaker from the Auvergne. He began his artistic career painting small ornamental miniatures for the jewellers at Dijon. He also attempted some portraits, which proved sufficiently successful to encourage him to move to Paris, at the age of about twenty. It was not long before he distinguished himself in the city, and his pleasing style of painting portraits and fancy subjects recommended him to the patronage of the Duke of Orleans, who, being fond of the art, became his pupil, and accommodated him with apartments in the palace of St. Cloud.

He was also favoured with the protection of the Princess Palatine, who presented him with her portrait, set in diamonds, when he expressed a desire to visit England, gave him, in 1721, a letter of recommendation to the Princess of Wales, afterwards Queen Caroline, whose portrait he had the honour of painting. He returned to Paris, where he remained for a few years, and having acquired an ample fortune, he settled in 1729 at Geneva, where he died in 1743. Works by him are in the Library and Museum of that city. His own portrait is in the Uffizi, Florence.

His brother was Benjamin Arlaud (1670-1731).
