= Portrait of Barthélemy-Jean-Claude Pupil =

1729 painting by Nicolas de Largillière

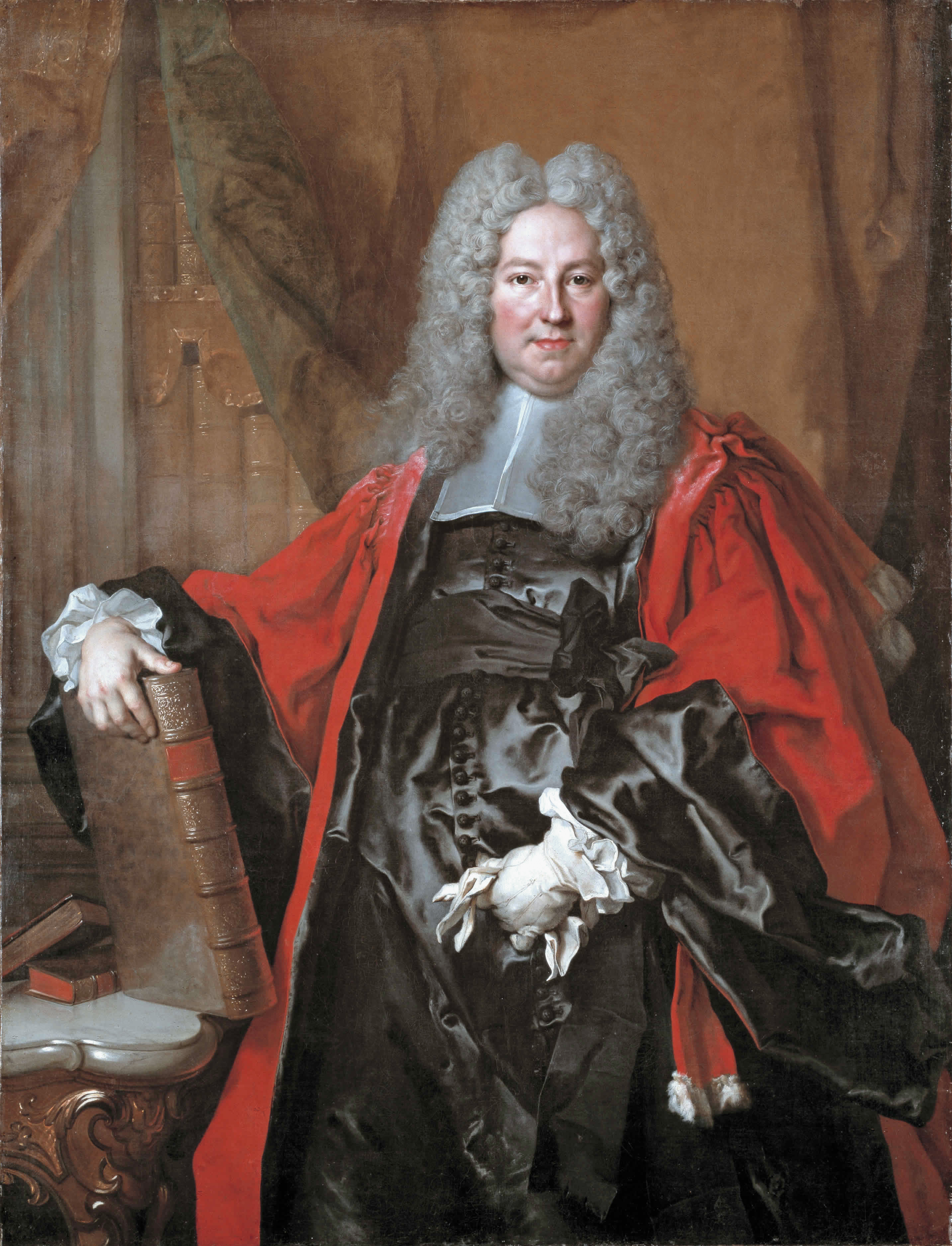
- Artist: Nicolas de Largillière
- Year: 1729
- Dimensions: 138.4 cm × 106.4 cm (54.5 in × 41.9 in)
- Location: Timken Museum of Art, San Diego, California, U.S.

Portrait of Barthélemy-Jean-Claude Pupil is a 1729 oil painting on canvas by Nicolas de Largillière. It is held at the collection of the Timken Museum of Art, in San Diego. A matching painting of Pupil's wife, Portrait of Marguerite de Sève, was painted at the same time, and the two paintings are considered a pair.
