= Jupiter and Io =

Painting by Antonio da Correggio

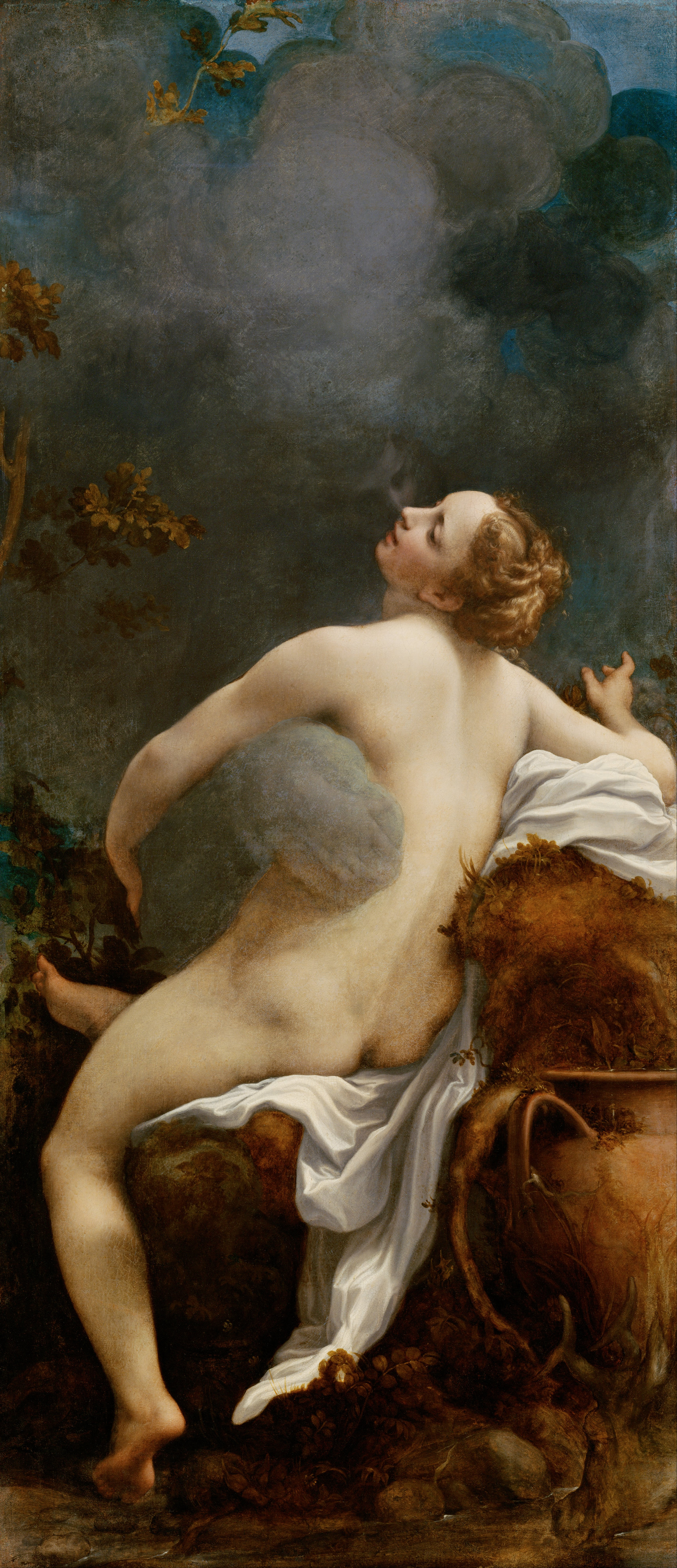
- Artist: Antonio da Correggio
- Year: c. 1532–1533
- Medium: Oil on canvas
- Dimensions: 163.5 cm × 70.5 cm (64.4 in × 27.8 in)
- Location: Kunsthistorisches Museum; Vienna

Jupiter and Io is a painting by the Italian High Renaissance artist Antonio da Correggio around 1530. It now hangs in the Kunsthistorisches Museum in Vienna, Austria.

== History ==
The series of Jupiter's Loves was conceived after the success of Venus and Cupid with a Satyr. Correggio painted four canvasses in total, although others had been programmed perhaps.

In the first edition of his Lives, late Renaissance art biographer Giorgio Vasari mentions only two of the paintings, Leda and the Swan (today at the Gemäldegalerie, Berlin) and one Venus (presumably the Danae currently in the Borghese Gallery of Rome), although he knew them only from descriptions provided by Giulio Romano. Vasari mentions that the commissioner, Duke Federico Gonzaga II of Mantua, wanted to donate the works to emperor and King of Spain Charles V: that the other two works, Ganymede Abducted by the Eagle and Jupiter and Io, were in Spain during the 16th century implies that they were part of the same series. British art historian Cecil Gould suggested that Federico had commissioned the Io and Ganymede for himself, and that they were ceded to Charles V only after the duke's death in 1540, perhaps on occasion of the marriage of the king's son, Philip; other hypothesized that Federico ordered them for the Ovid room in his Palazzo Te.

The canvas was in Vienna since as early as the 1610s, when it is mentioned in the Habsburg imperial collections together with Ganymede.

== Description ==
The scene of Jupiter and Io is inspired by Ovid's classic Metamorphoses. Io, daughter of Inachus, the first king of Argos, is seduced by Jupiter (Zeus in Greek), who hides behind the dunes to avoid hurting the jealous Juno (Hera in Greek). Jupiter was often tempted by other women and took on various disguises in order to cover his various escapades, one time taking the form of a swan, another time of an eagle, and in this painting he is not becoming something else so much as enveloping himself in a dark cloud, even though it is bright daylight. He is embracing the nymph, his face barely visible above hers. She is pulling Jupiter's vague, smoky hand towards herself with barely contained sensuality; this is a sensual painting, depicting one of the many loves of the god. Indeed, the Duke of Mantua, Federico Gonzaga, wanted to place the painting and its companion pieces in a room dedicated to the loves of Jupiter.

Noteworthy is the contrast between the evanescent figure of the immaterial Jupiter, and the sensual substance of Io's body, shown lost in an erotic rapture which anticipates the works of Bernini and Rubens.

== Sources ==
- Adani, Giuseppe (2007). Correggio pittore universale. Correggio: Silvana Editoriale. ISBN 978-88-366-0977-2.
