= Leda and the Swan (Correggio) =

Painting by Antonio da Correggio

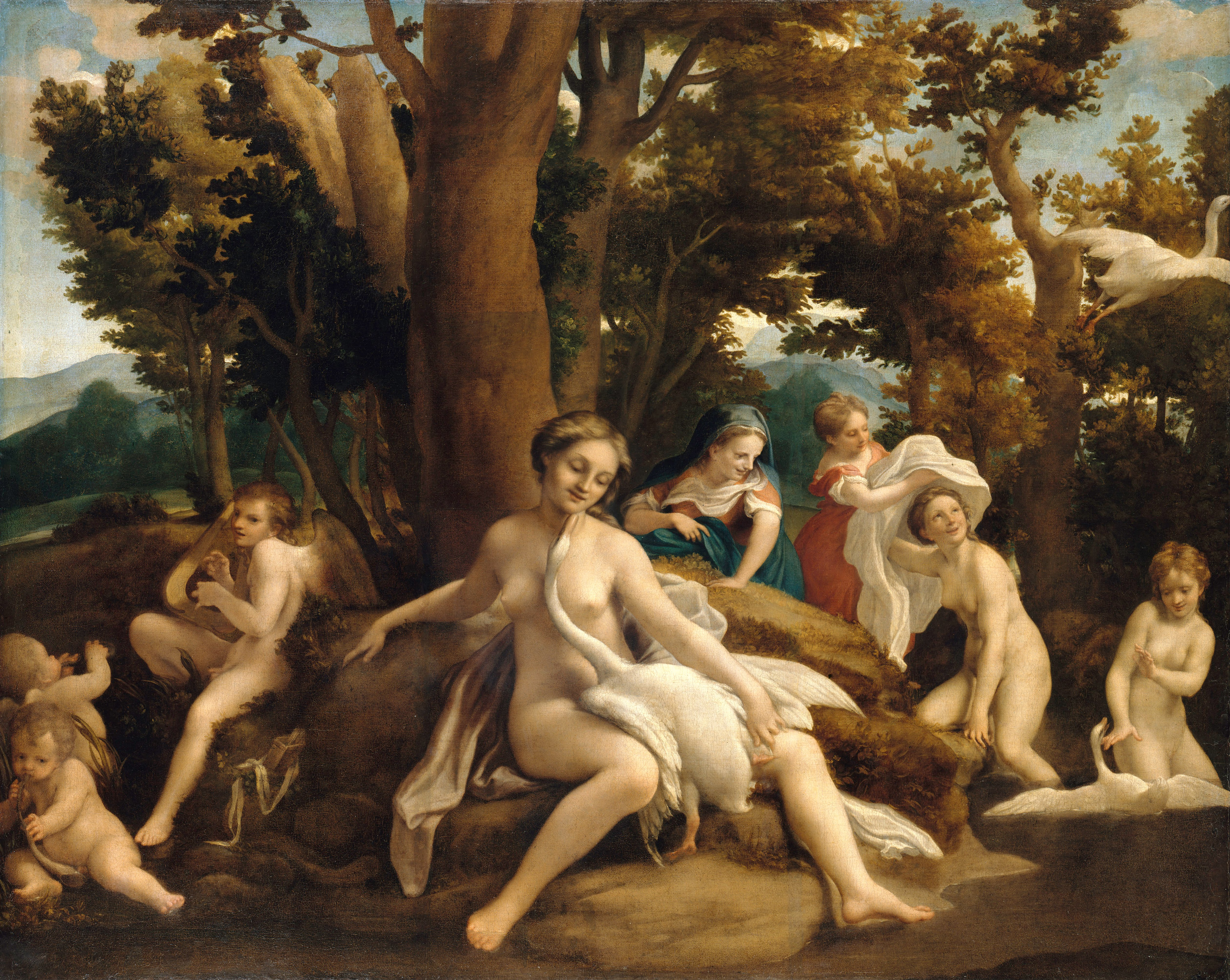
- Artist: Antonio da Correggio
- Year: c. 1532 (Julian)
- Medium: oil on canvas
- Dimensions: 152 cm (60 in) × 191 cm (75 in)
- Commissioner: Federico II Gonzaga of Mantua
- Accession: 218

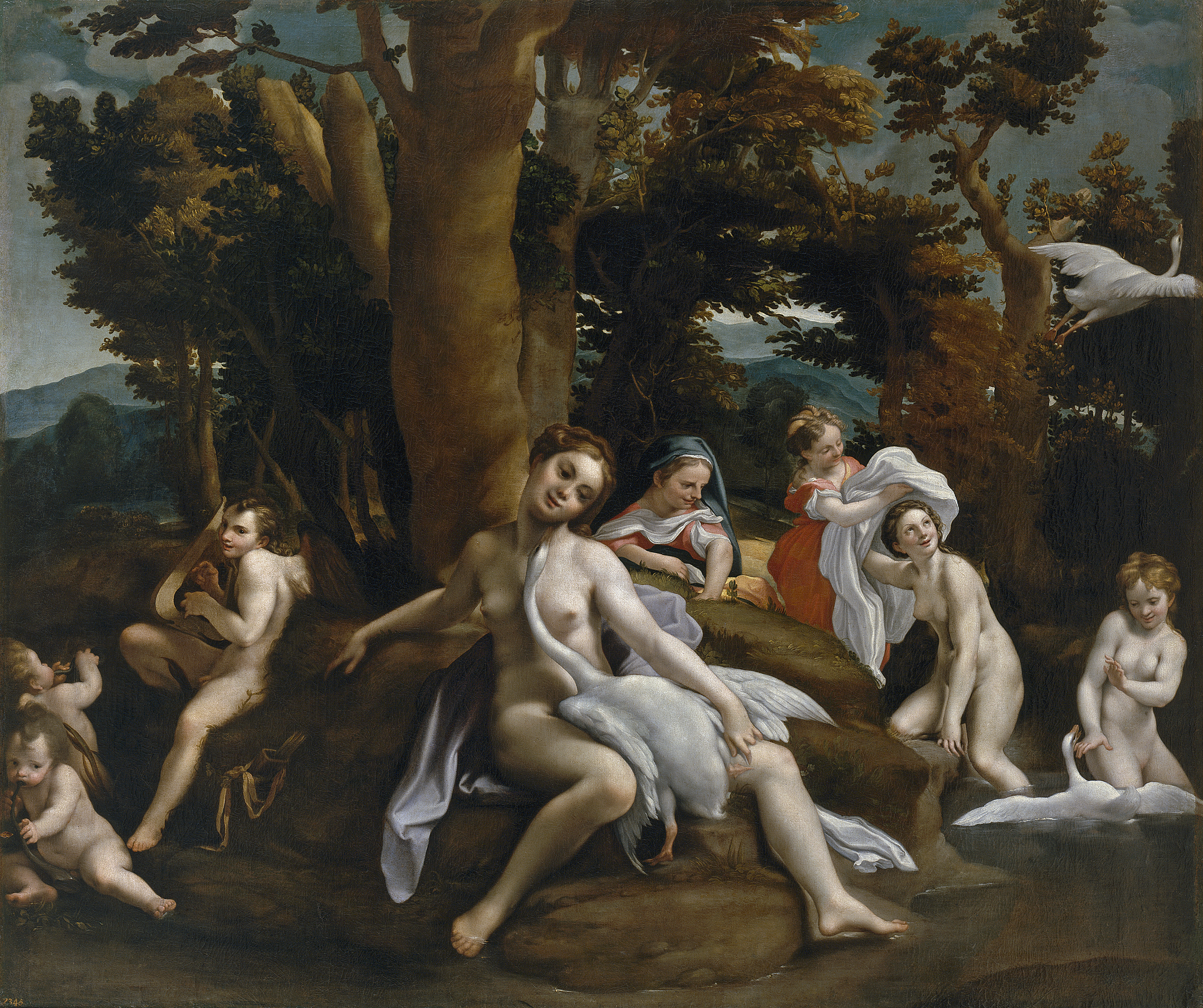
The 1604 copy by Eugenio Cajés before the painting left Spain, showing the original's state before it was damaged and restored (Museo del Prado, Madrid).

Leda and the Swan (known in Italian as Leda) is an oil on canvas painting from 1530–31 by the Italian painter Correggio, now in the Gemäldegalerie in Berlin. It shows three scenes of Leda's seduction by Jupiter who has taken the form of a swan. Their first meeting is shown on the right hand side and their lovemaking in the centre, where Leda sits with the swan between her thighs, guiding him with her left hand. They are accompanied to their left by Cupid with his bow and two cupids with flutes. The third scene (again on the right hand side) is the swan flying away whilst Leda gets dressed. Leda and the Swan was a common subject in 16th-century art.

== History ==
Correggio conceived a series of works entitled Amori di Giove or Love Affairs of Jupiter after the success of Venus and Cupid with a Satyr. The series eventually consisted of two pairs of works, each pair having the same dimensions, though he may have planned for there to be more. The precise order of the four works is still debated, though their main importance lies in their contribution to the development of secular and mythological painting via its new and extraordinary balance between naturalist rendering and poetic transfiguration. Correggio had made a study of Michelangelo's Leda and the Swan.

According to Vasari's Lives of the Artists, the Leda and a Venus (i.e. Danaë) were commissioned by Federico II Gonzaga, Duke of Mantua as a gift for Charles V, Holy Roman Emperor. This is supported by the theory that Jupiter was flying out of the right hand side of Leda in swan form and into the left hand side of Danaë in golden-shower form. However, one more recent study suggests that all the paintings in the amori di Giove series were produced for the Sala di Ovidio (Ovid Room) in Mantua (meant for the duke's lover Isabella Boschetti) and only moved to Spain after Federico II's death in 1540, perhaps on the infante Philip's marriage to Maria Emanuela d'Aviz (1543).

In 1601 Ganymede Abducted by the Eagle and 1603 this painting were still in the Spanish royal collections – and were both acquired that year by Rudolf II and taken to Prague. The paintings' later owners were similar to those of Danaë – it moved to Sweden during the Thirty Years War and Christina of Sweden gave it to cardinal Decio Azzolini; it was later in the famous Orleans Collection owned by Philippe II, Duke of Orléans. However, his devout son Louis found the painting too licentious and attacked it with a knife, irreparably damaging Leda's face.

What was left of the painting was given to Charles-Antoine Coypel, first painter to the king, who painted a replacement head. Still in pieces, the painting was sold in 1753 to the collector Pasquier, who commissioned the painter Jacques-François Delyen to paint a new replacement head – in 1755 the count of Epinaille bought it on behalf of Frederick the Great, who hung it in his summer palace of Sanssouci. It was confiscated by Napoleon and restored again by Pierre-Paul Prud'hon before being returned to Germany in 1814 and placed in the Berlin museums in 1830 – there Jakob Schlesinger painted a third replacement for Leda's head. However, the 1604 copy shows that even this restoration censored Correggio's original composition, giving Leda a chaste rather than orgasmic expression and removing the backwards twist of her head that Correggio had originally intended (similar to that of Io in his Jupiter and Io).

== See also ==
- 100 Great Paintings, 1980 BBC series

== Bibliography ==
- (in Italian) Giuseppe Adani, Correggio pittore universale, Silvana Editoriale, Correggio 2007. ISBN 978-88-366-0977-2
