= Portrait of a Lady (Correggio) =

C. 1517–c. 1520 painting by Correggio

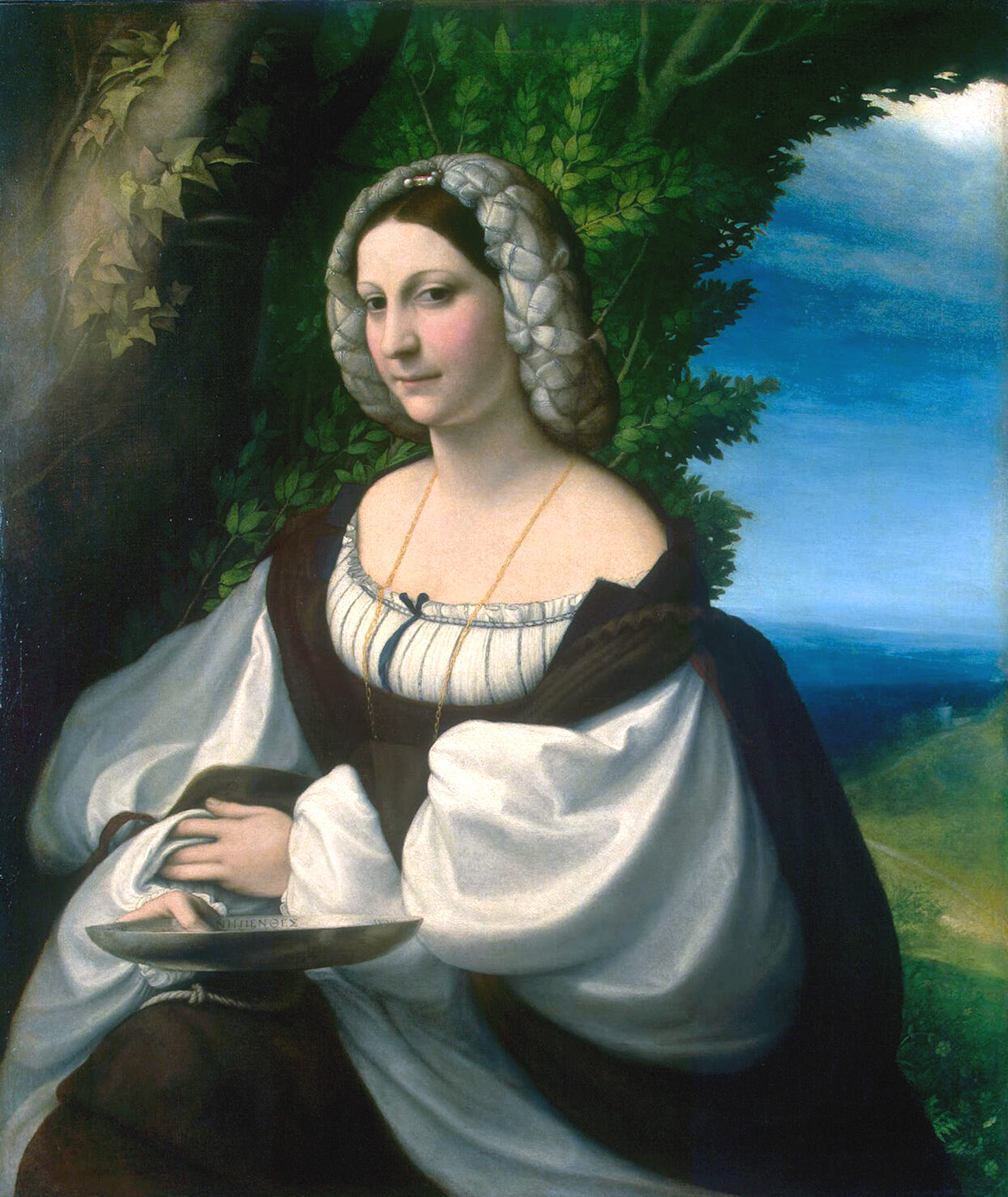
- Artist: Antonio da Correggio
- Year: c. 1517–c. 1520
- Medium: Oil on canvas
- Dimensions: 103 cm × 87.5 cm (41 in × 34.4 in)
- Location: Hermitage Museum, Saint Petersburg

Portrait of a Lady is an oil on canvas painting by Correggio, dated c. 1517–c. 1520. The painting is currently held at the Hermitage Museum in Saint Petersburg.

== History ==
The early history of the painting is unknown. It has been in the possession of the Hermitage Museum since 1925. The style of the painting suggests it was created around the same time as the Camera di San Paolo frescoes. The painting is often compared with Caravaggio's Madonna of the Stairs.

This painting was formerly attributed to Lorenzo Lotto, but has been attributed to Corregio based on a signature on the tree trunk to the left.

== Description ==
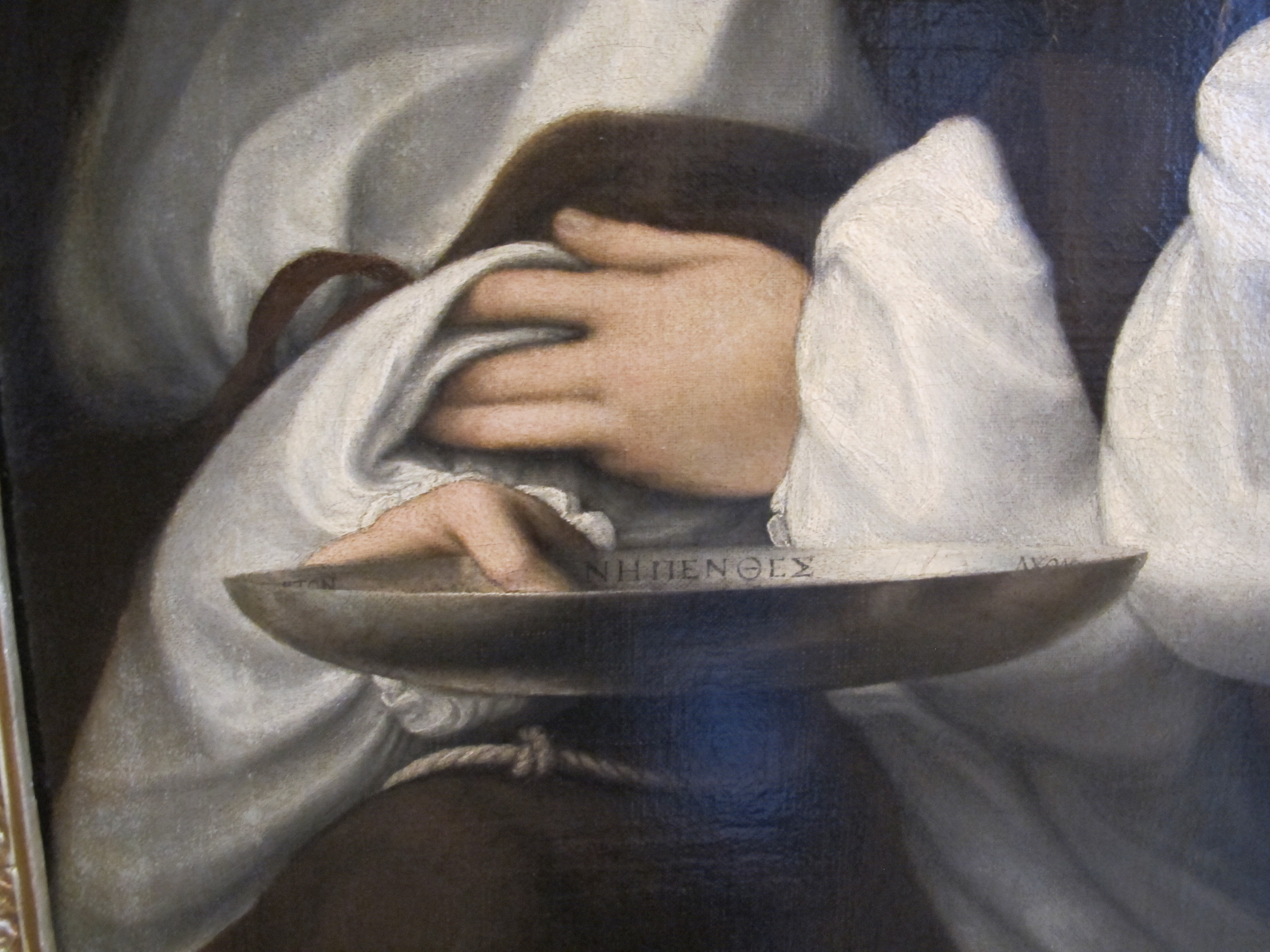
Detail of the figure's hand and cup

The Portrait of a Lady is a large painting, 103cm by 87.5cm. It shows a three-quarter length portrait of a woman against a backdrop of a leafy tree (the trunk of which is covered in ivy) and a distant landscape on the right, which is dominated by a deep blue sky. The woman portrayed is facing to the left of the image, with her face tilted to the viewer. She is wearing a low-cut black and white robe. She has an elaborate hairstyle kept in place by a brooch. She also wears a gold necklace. In the woman's hand there is a cup with a Greek inscription; The inscription is a quotation from Homer's Odyssey ("NHΠENΘΕΣ", or Nepenthe). Underneath this cup there is a rope on the woman's leg.

== Analysis ==
Although it is not known who the client was, the inscription from Homer's Odyssey suggests that they were a member of the educated class with an interest in classical literature. The specific quotation, "NHΠENΘΕΣ", or nepenthe, could be labelling the contents of the cup; in the Odyssey, nepenthe is a drug used as a grief antidote. The woman's clothes, jewels and elaborate hairstyle also suggest that the woman was of high social class. The rope on the woman's leg is symbolic of the Franciscans.
