= Adoration of the Christ Child (Correggio) =

Painting by Corregio

Adoration of the Child
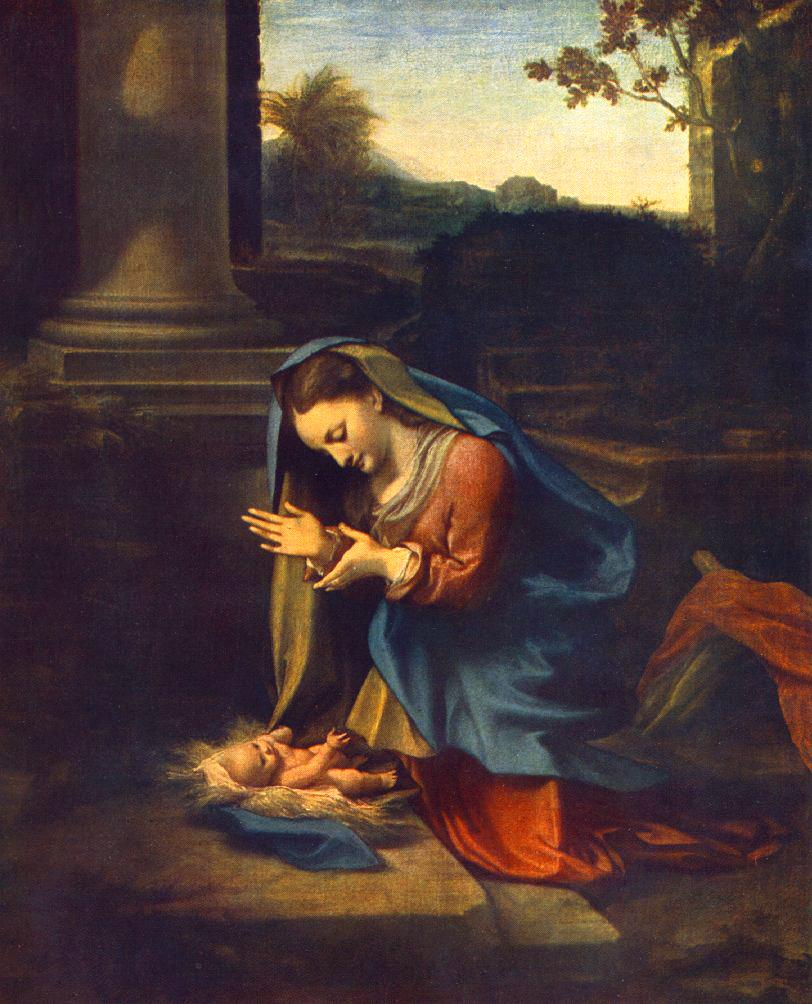
- Artist: Correggio
- Year: c. 1526
- Medium: Oil on canvas
- Dimensions: 81 cm × 67 cm (32 in × 26 in)
- Location: Uffizi Gallery, Florence

Adoration of the Christ Child is an oil on canvas painting by the Italian Renaissance artist Correggio, dating from around 1526 and housed in the Uffizi Gallery of Florence, Italy.

== History ==
The work was donated by Francesco I Gonzaga, duke of Mantua, to Cosimo II de' Medici of Tuscany in 1617. The Medici exhibited it in the Uffizi Tribune, where it remained until 1634. The original commission of the painting is however unknown, although some identify it with that mentioned by late Renaissance art biographer Giorgio Vasari and which had been brought to Reggio Emilia from Genoa by Luca Pallavicino.

The dating of the work is based on stylistic elements: the 1524-1526 dating derives from similarities with the Deposition and the Martyrdom of Four Saints. Copies of the painting were executed by Johan Zoffany and Giovan Battista Stefaneschi.

== Sources ==
- Adani, Giuseppe (2007). Correggio pittore universale. Correggio: Silvana Editoriale.
