= Holy Family with Saints Elizabeth and John the Baptist (Correggio, Pavia) =

Painting sometimes attributed to Antonio da Correggio

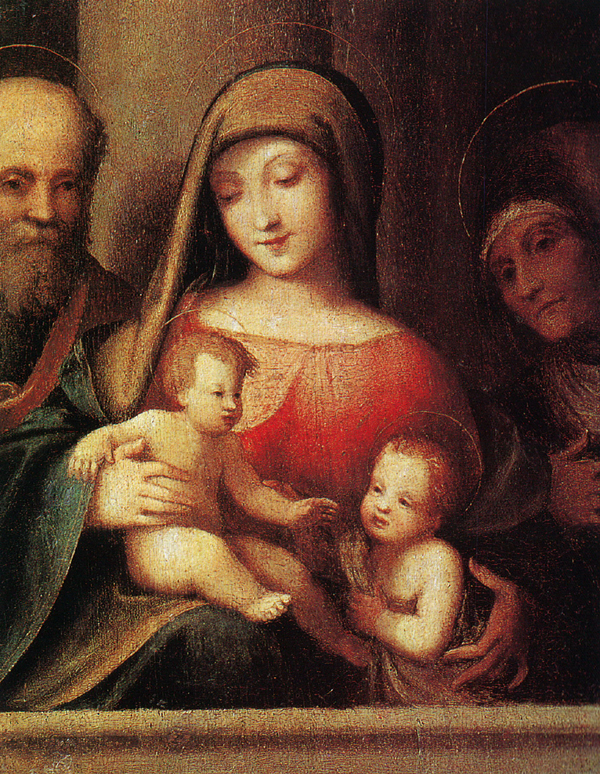
Holy Family

Holy Family with Saints Elizabeth and John the Baptist is an oil on panel painting, dating to around 1510, sometimes attributed to Correggio. It measures 28 by 21.5 cm and is now in the Pinacoteca Malaspina in Pavia.

== Life ==
Before arriving in the Pinacoteca collection it belonged to marchese Luigi Malaspina - it was recorded in his 1833 will as a work by Francesco Francia, a painter from Bologna. It was re-attributed to Correggio by Giovanni Morelli in 1880, with whom most later art historians have agreed. It was exhibited at the first major retrospective of Correggio's work in Parma in 1884. More recently, however, it has been suggested that it be re-attributed to the Orombelli Master, an anonymous Mantuan painter. David Ekserdjian has also expressed doubts about the work being by Correggio.

The painting seems to be too low quality to be by Correggio, unless it is a very early work by him. Comparison with definite Corregios from the 1520s, such as Madonna and Child with the Infant John the Baptist, also suggests it is not by him. However, its poor state of conservation makes a definite attribution difficult - Gustavo Frizzoni already complained in 1901 of inappropriate restorations and it was also damaged during restorations in 1914 by Luigi Cavenaghi and in 1948 by Mario Rossi.
