= Madonna and Child with the Infant John the Baptist (Correggio, Madrid) =

1518 painting by Antonio da Correggio

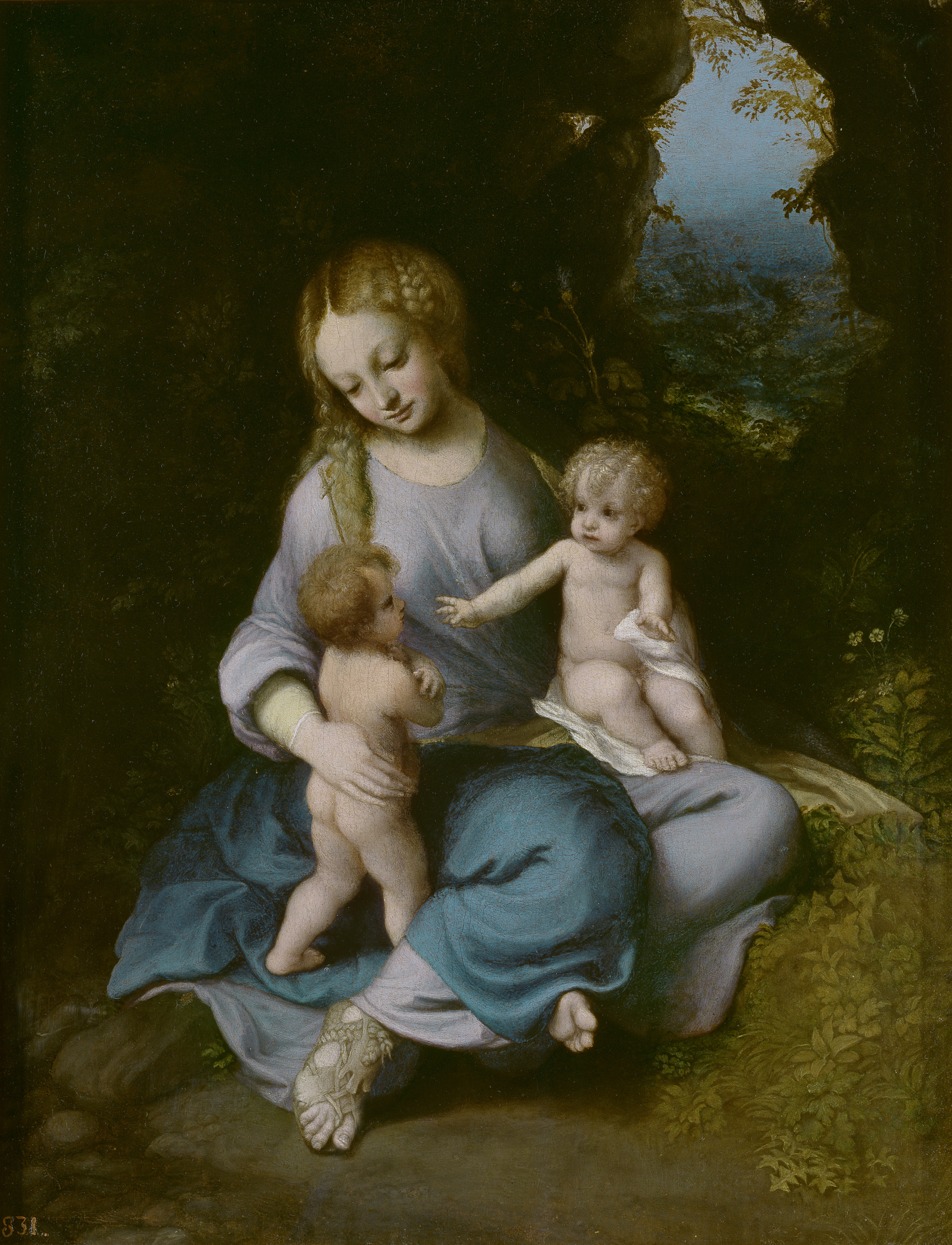
- Artist: Antonio da Correggio
- Year: c.1516
- Type: oil paint on panel
- Dimensions: 48 cm × 37 cm (19 in × 15 in)
- Location: Museo del Prado; Madrid

The Madonna and Child with the Infant John the Baptist (previously also known as The Virgin of the Sandal) is a 1518 oil-on-panel painting by the Italian painter Antonio da Correggio.

Stylistically it is closest to the frescoes Correggio produced for the Camera di San Paolo and the fact that it was a model for Michelangelo Anselmi suggests that Correggio painted it in Parma. It is the work in which Leonardo da Vinci's influence on Correggio is most obvious – it forms a free variation on Leonardo's The Virgin of the Rocks.

It was brought from Parma to Madrid by Isabella Farnese on her second marriage to Philip V of Spain. It was registered among her goods at La Granja in 1746 and now hangs in the Prado Museum.

== Sources ==
- Giuseppe Adani, Correggio pittore universale, Silvana Editoriale, Correggio 2007. ISBN 9788836609772
- http://www.correggioarthome.it/SchedaOpera.jsp?idDocumentoArchivio=2504
- http://www.museodelprado.es/en/the-collection/online-gallery/on-line-gallery/obra/the-virgin-and-christ-child-with-saint-john/
