= Judith and Her Maidservant (Correggio) =

Painting by Correggio

- Judith and Her Maidservant with the Head of Holofernes
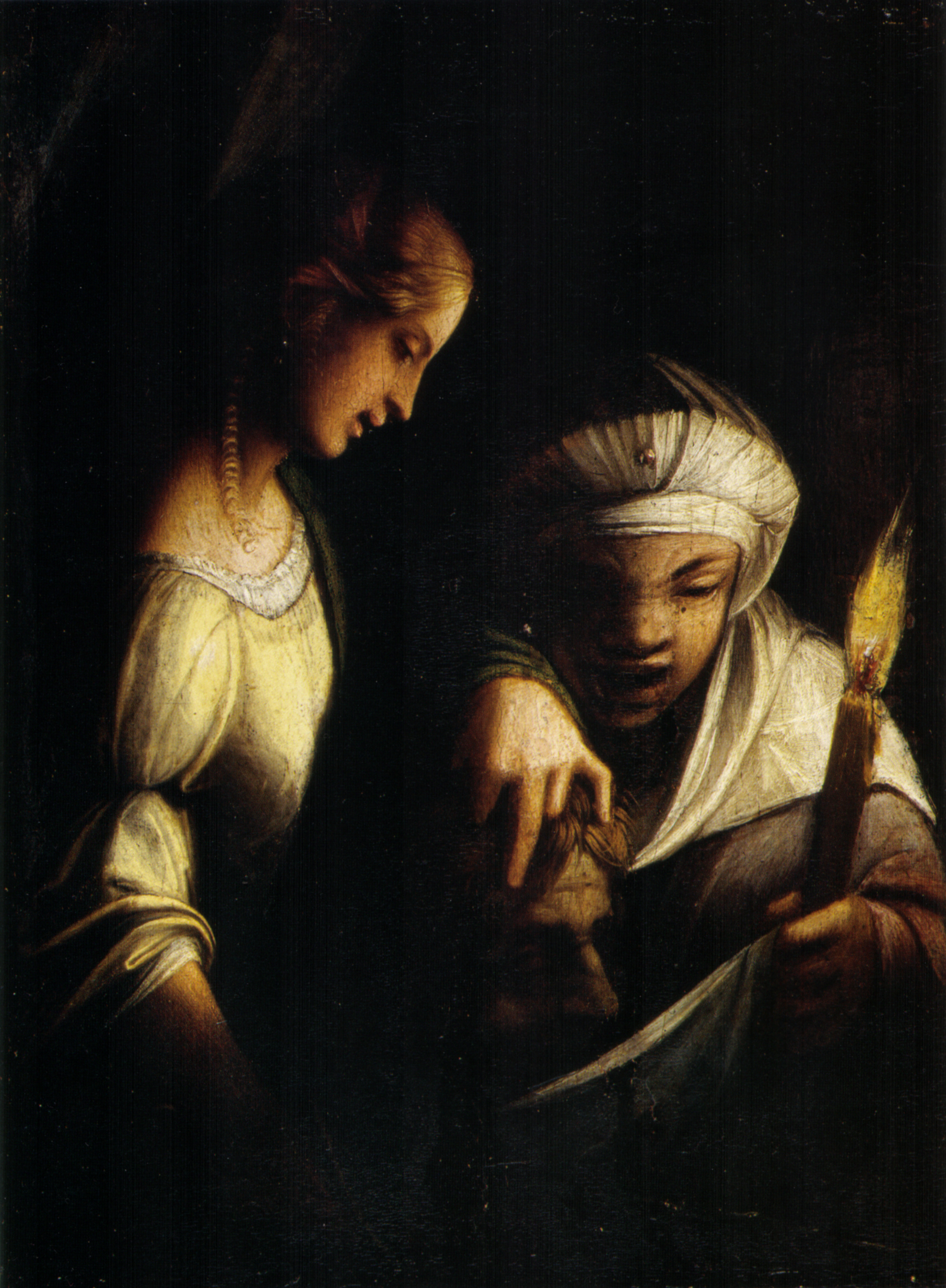
- Artist: Correggio
- Year: between 1510 and 1514
- Medium: oil on panel (poplar)
- Movement: Italian Renaissance; Cinquecento; History painting
- Subject: Judith beheading Holofernes
- Dimensions: 30 cm × 22 cm (12 in × 8.7 in)
- Location: Musée des Beaux-Arts, Strasbourg
- Accession: 1892

Judith and Her Maidservant or Judith and Her Maidservant with the Head of Holofernes is an oil painting on panel executed circa 1510–1514 by the Italian Renaissance painter Correggio, now in the Musée des Beaux-Arts of Strasbourg, France. Its inventory number is 252.

Details such as Judith's hairstyle date the work to Correggio's early period. Its subject matter was often painted by Correggio's master Mantegna, whilst its chiaroscuro effect laid the foundations for the noted "nocturnes" by Caravaggio.

Its first definite appearance in the historical record dates to 1892, when Wilhelm von Bode bought it for its present owner. It was soon attributed to Correggio. There is a reference to a "half-length" Judith "in mock-night" in a Gonzaga inventory of 1627 which may be identifiable with the work, as may a number of mentions of a Correggio "Herodias", possibly a mistake for Judith in the c.1510 work.
