= Mystic Marriage of Saint Catherine (Correggio, Paris) =

C.1527 painting by Correggio

Mystic Marriage of Saint Catherine of Alexandria with Saint Sebastian
- Mystic Marriage of Saint Catherine
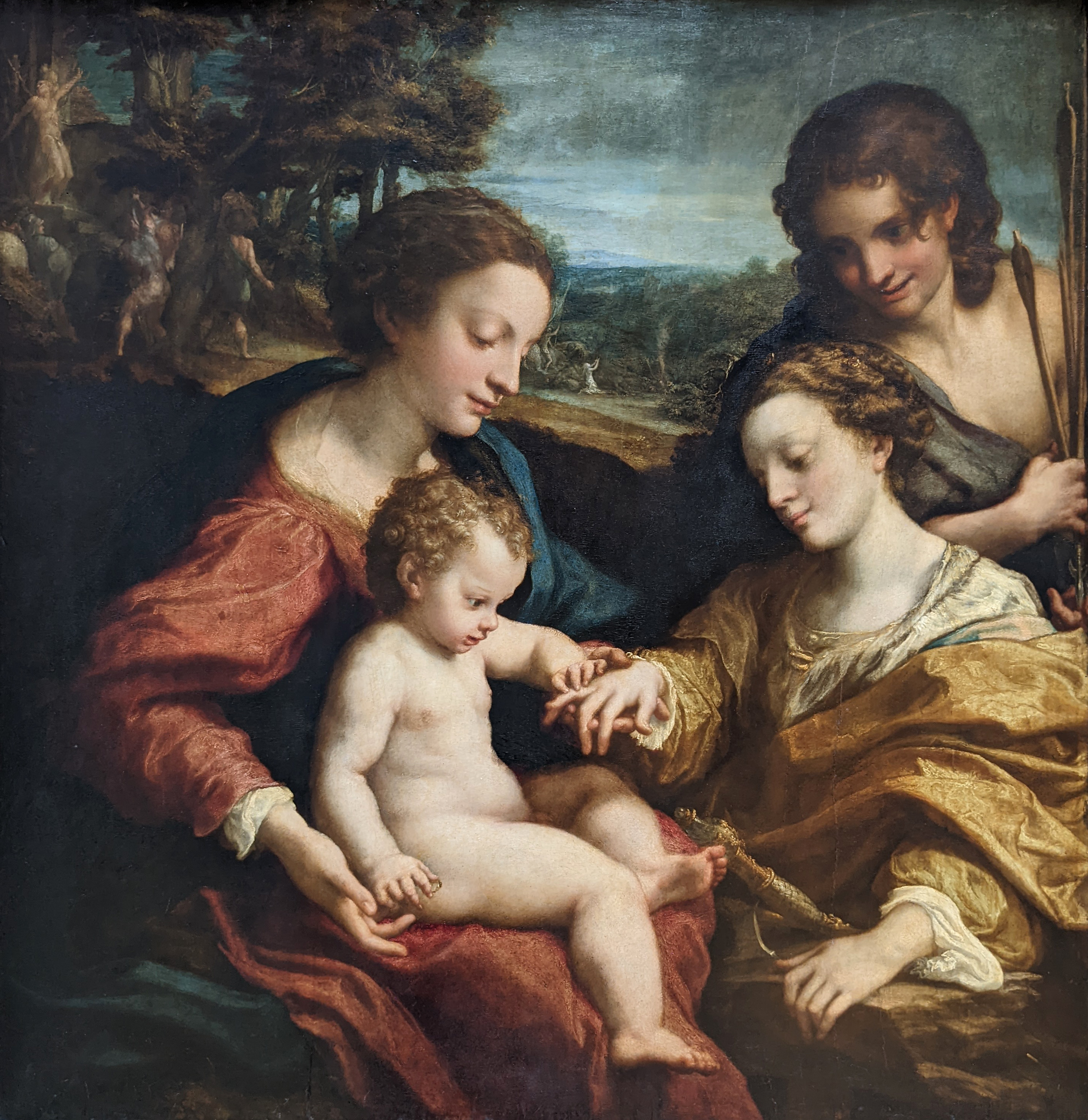
- Artist: Antonio da Correggio
- Year: c. 1527
- Dimensions: 105 cm (41 in) × 102 cm (40 in)

The Mystic Marriage of Saint Catherine (or Mystical) is a painting by Correggio dating about the mid-1520s currently held and exhibited at the Louvre in Paris, France.

== History ==
The history of this picture can be traced right back to the beginning. Giorgio Vasari mentions it as being in the house of a Modenese doctor, Francesco Grillenzoni; in 1582 Cardinal Luigi d'Este bought it, and presented it to Caterina de' Nobili Sforza, Countess of Santa Fiora and grand-niece of Pope Julius III. It was still in her possession in 1595.

In 1614 the panel was in Rome, the property of Cardinal Francesco Sforza, who had no doubt inherited it. It was subsequently owned by Scipione Borghese, and then by Cardinal Antonio Barberini; the latter gave it to Cardinal Mazarin in c. 1650. Louis XIV bought it from Mazarin's heirs in 1661, for 15000 livres.

Correggio first depicted this subject in another painting originally held in Naples (and not universally accepted as his work). The Louvre picture dates from the early 1520s, and it shows clear signs of Leonardo's influence (esp. lips, hands, visage), to which Correggio was particularly susceptible in his endeavour to convey a soft and graceful effect.

A number of replicas of this painting have been made, many of which still survive. It has often been a source of inspiration to artists: in the 19th century it was copied by Louis Gustave Ricard, and several times by Fantin-Latour.

== See also ==
- Correggio
- Renaissance art
- Mystical Marriage of Saint Catherine
- Mystical marriage
