= Mystic Marriage of Saint Catherine (Correggio, Washington) =

C. 1510–1511 painting by Correggio

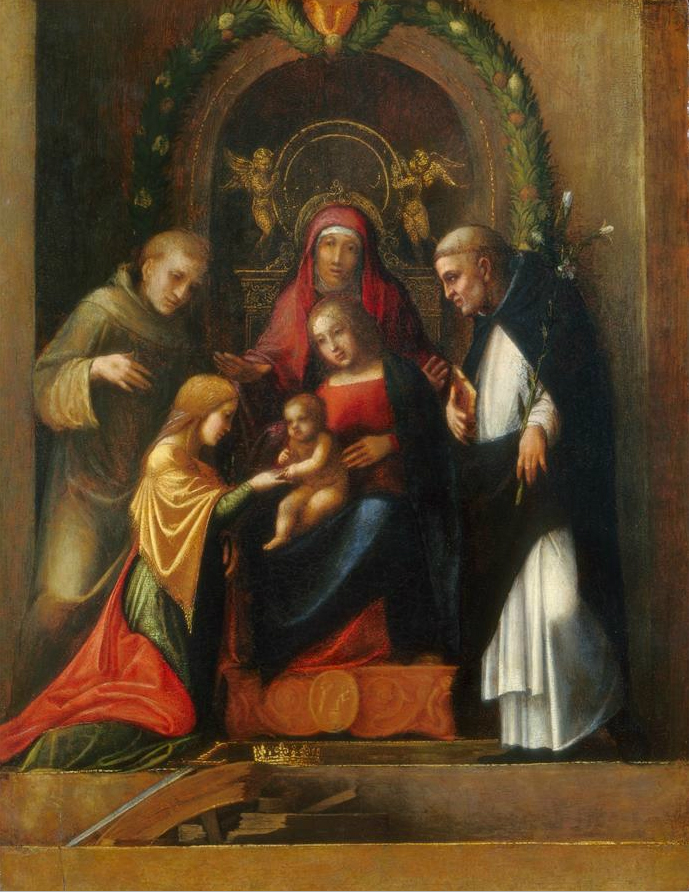

Mystic Marriage of Saint Catherine or Mystic Marriage of Saint Catherine with Saints is a c.1510–1511 oil on canvas painting by Correggio, now in the National Gallery of Art in Washington. Its central group is a Metterza, with Catherine of Alexandria kneeling before them and saints Francis of Assisi and Dominic to either side.

The work first appears in the written record as part of the collection of count Giovanni Battista Costabili Containi (m. 1841) in Ferrara and it remained in the hands of his heirs until at least 1858. The attribution to Correggio was first popularised by Giovanni Morelli, who saw the work in 1875 while it was still in Ferrara, though local scholars had already made such an attribution, placing it in the artist's youth. Damage to the paint surface, especially in the area of the mantle and the faces of the Virgin Mary and Saint Anne, was already mentioned in the late 19th century.

It was recorded as owned by doctor Gustavo Frizzoni in Milan in 1877 before passing through the hands of various heirs. In the 1930s it was bought from the engineer Bonomi by Alessandro Contini Bonacossi, who in 1932 sold it to Samuel H. Kress, who finally gave it to its present owner in 1939.
