= Madonna and Child with the Infant John the Baptist (Correggio, Chicago) =

Painting by Correggio (1513–14)

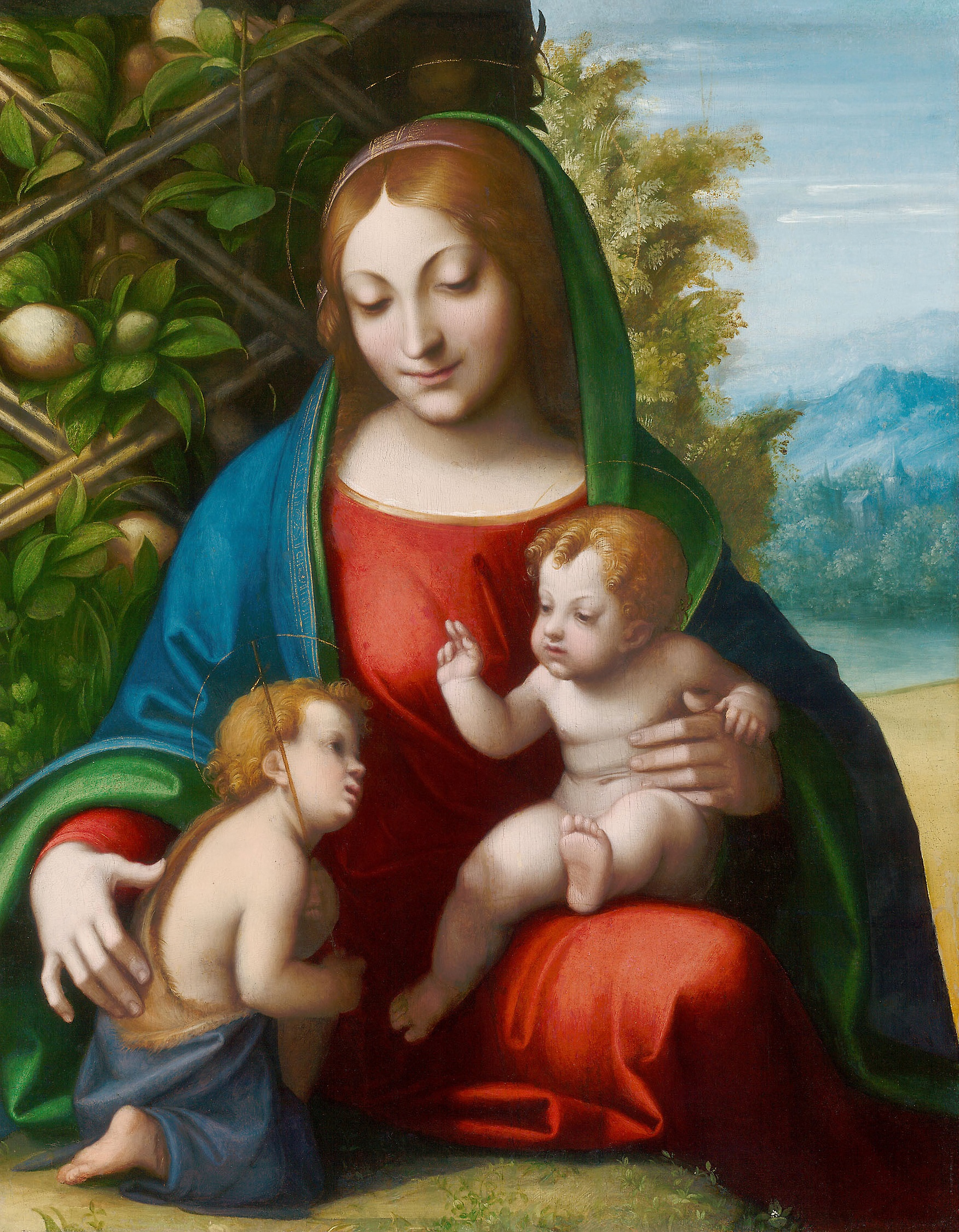
- Artist: Antonio da Correggio
- Year: c.1515
- Type: oil paint on panel
- Dimensions: 64 cm × 60 cm (25 in × 24 in)
- Location: Art Institute of Chicago; Chicago

The Madonna and Child with the Infant John the Baptist is a 1513–1514 painting by the Italian artist Correggio.

It was painted by a young Correggio in the city of Parma, remote from the immediate influences of traditional Renaissance art, although aspects of its style are reminiscent of Raphael, Leonardo da Vinci and the burgeoning Dutch masters.

Correggio's use of sfumato and chiaroscuro creates softness in the features of the Virgin, Christ Child, and Infant St. John the Baptist– reminiscent of the stylization of Leonardesque pieces– and representing an emotional response between the figures.

After passing through a number of hands it was bought by Wildenstein & Co. for the Art Institute of Chicago in 1965. Although stolen shortly afterwards, it was soon recovered and still hangs there.
