= Danaë (Correggio) =

Painting by Antonio da Correggio

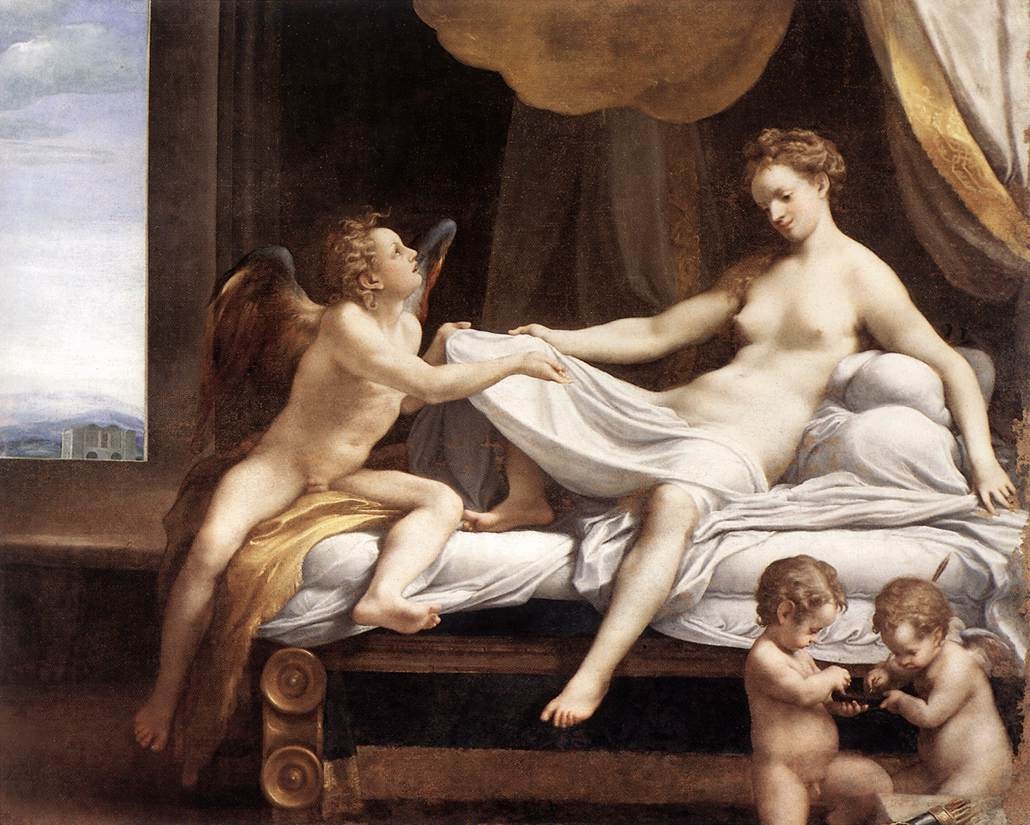
- Artist: Correggio
- Year: c. 1531
- Medium: Oil on canvas
- Dimensions: 161 cm × 193 cm (63 in × 76 in)
- Location: Galleria Borghese; Rome

Danaë is a painting by the Italian Renaissance artist Correggio, executed around 1531 and now in the Galleria Borghese in Rome.

== History ==
The work was commissioned by the Duke of Mantua Federico II Gonzaga, as a part of a series portraying Jupiter's loves, perhaps destined to the Ovid Hall in the Palazzo Te of Mantua. After Federico's death it went to Spain.

In 1584 the painter Giovanni Paolo Lomazzo mentions the canvas in Milan, as part of sculptor Leone Leoni's collection. His son Pompeo Leoni sold it to Emperor Rudolph II (1601–1603); later, together with Correggio's Leda and the Swan, it was brought from Prague to Stockholm as war booty by King Gustavus Adolphus of Sweden. His daughter Christina, after abdicating, brought the canvas with her to Rome. After her death, it was inherited by Cardinal Decio Azzolino, being subsequently owned by Livio Odescalchi, Duke of Bracciano, then by the French regent Philippe II, Duke of Orléans.

Together with most of the Orleans Collection, in 1792 it was sold to England, where it was owned by the Duke of Bridgewater and Henry Hope, until, in 1827, it was acquired in Paris by Prince Camillo Borghese for his Roman collection.

== Analysis ==
The painting portrays the Greek mythological figure Danaë, the daughter of Acrisius, king of Argos. After an oracle forecast that Acrisius would be killed by her son, he had her jailed in a bronze tower. However, as told by the Roman poet Ovid in his Metamorphoses, Jupiter reached her in the form of a gold rain, impregnated her, and made her mother to Perseus.

Correggio portrays Danaë lying on a bed, while a child Eros undresses her as gold rains from a cloud. At the foot of the bed, two putti are testing gold and lead arrows against a touchstone.

== See also ==
- Danaë (Rembrandt painting)
- Danaë (Klimt painting)
- Danaë (Titian series)
