= Martyrdom of Four Saints =

C.1524 painting by Correggio

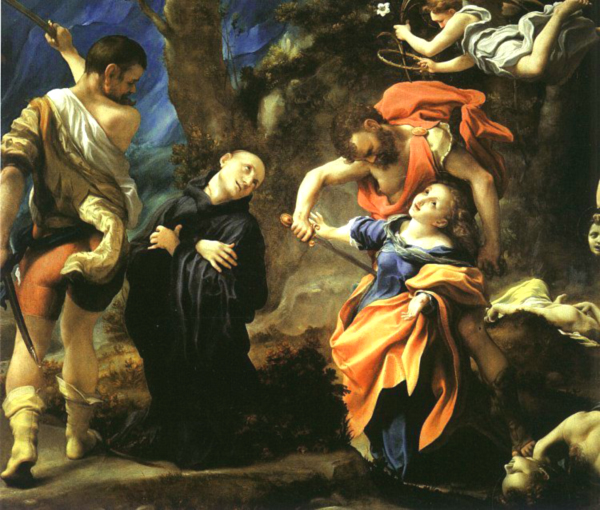
- Artist: Correggio
- Year: c. 1524
- Medium: Oil on canvas
- Dimensions: 160 cm × 185 cm (63 in × 73 in)
- Location: Galleria Nazionale, Parma

The Martyrdom of Four Saints is an oil on canvas painting by the Italian Renaissance artist Correggio, dating from around 1524 and housed in the Galleria Nazionale of Parma, Italy.

== History ==
The work is one of the canvasses commissioned by Parmesan noble Placido Del Bono for a chapel in the church of San Giovanni Evangelista in Parma. They are mentioned (although wrongly assigned to the city's cathedral) by late Renaissance art biographer Giorgio Vasari in the first edition of his Lives (1550).

The subject of the painting, rather rare in western religious art, is the martyrdom of Placidus and his sister Flavia (who had allegedly lived in the 4th century) and, behind them, that of two earlier Roman siblings, Eutychius and Victorinus, who appear to have been already beheaded. An angel flies above them and holds the palm of martyrdom.

== Sources ==
- Adani, Giuseppe (2007). Correggio pittore universale. Correggio: Silvana Editoriale.
