= Camera di San Paolo =

Room in the monastery of San Paolo, Italy

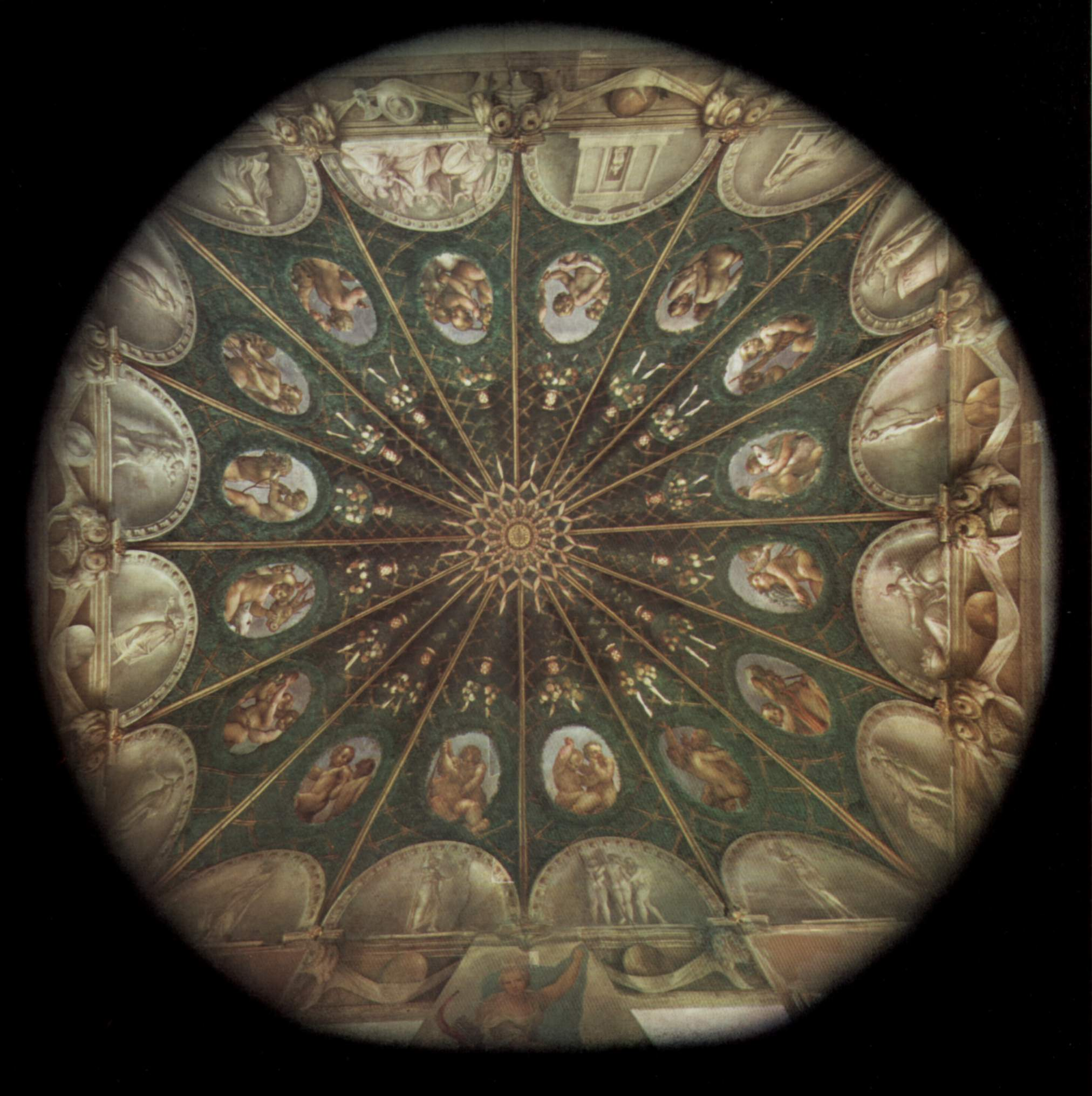
Overview of the vault frescoes.

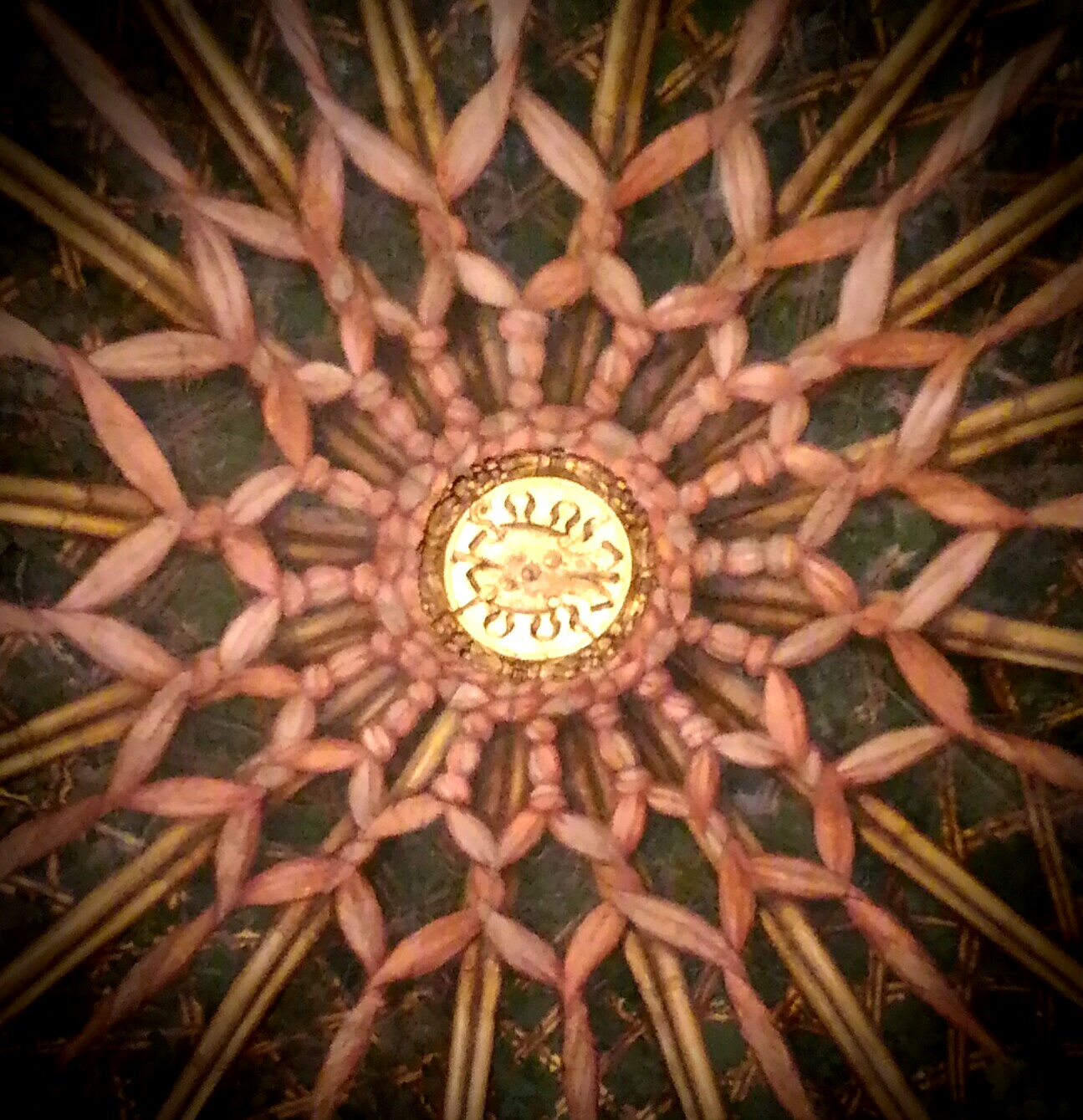
Coat of arms of abbess Giovanna.

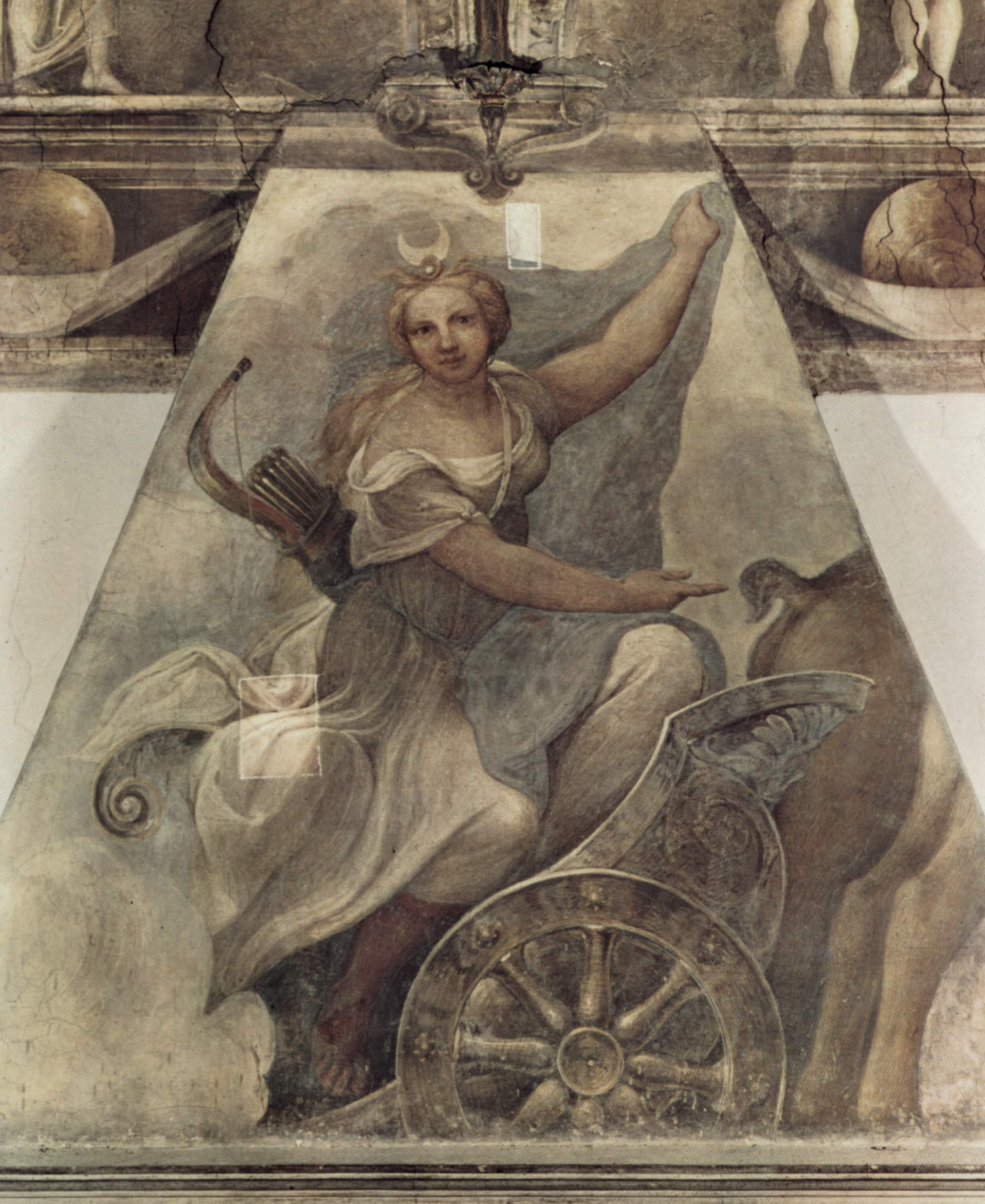
The fresco of Diana in the fireplace.

The Camera di San Paolo (Italian: "Chamber of St. Paul) or Camera della Badessa (Italian: "Abbess' Chamber") is a room in the former Monastery of San Paolo, in Parma, northern Italy. It is painted with frescoes by Correggio in the vault (697x645 cm) and over the fireplace.

== History ==
In the early 16th century the Benedictine monastery of Saint Paul was one of the wealthiest and most influential religious institutions in Parma. Giovanna Piacenza, in her first decade as abbess, ordered improvements and decorations. In 1514, the vault of her private apartment was decorated by Alessandro Araldi, with biblical and mythological subjects. This, a few years later, led to a similar but more up-to-date project for the adjacent chamber, this time assigned to Correggio, who had moved to Parma around 1519. It is not known how the painter and Giovanna came into contact, although Correggio at the time had familiarity with another Benedictine monastery, that of San Benedetto Po in what is now the province of Mantua.

The work shows influence from the contemporary Romean Renaissance painting style, in particular the Raphael Rooms in the Vatican Palace, and perhaps Mantegna's Belvedere Chapel, now lost, although no visit to Rome by Correggio is documented. There are also some affinities with Leonardo da Vinci's style, such as that in the Sala delle Asse, which can be explained by a voyage (again undocumented) by the artist to Milan.

The decoration, completed in 1520, began a period for Correggio as one of the most celebrated painters in Italy, with works such as the domes in Parma Cathedral and San Giovanni Evangelista. The work itself became an immediate landmark in illusionistic painting, influencing local artists such as Parmigianino, in particular in his work in the Rocca of Fontanellato.

In 1524 an enclosure rule was forced on the convent, preventing male visitors, and for some two centuries the existence of the chamber's decoration remained unknown. In 1774 the painter and art historian Anton Raphael Mengs analyzed the work, which thenceforth became known as an important example of late Renaissance painting in Italy. The iconography of the frescoes has been the subject of debate, and at present has not yet been conclusively explained.

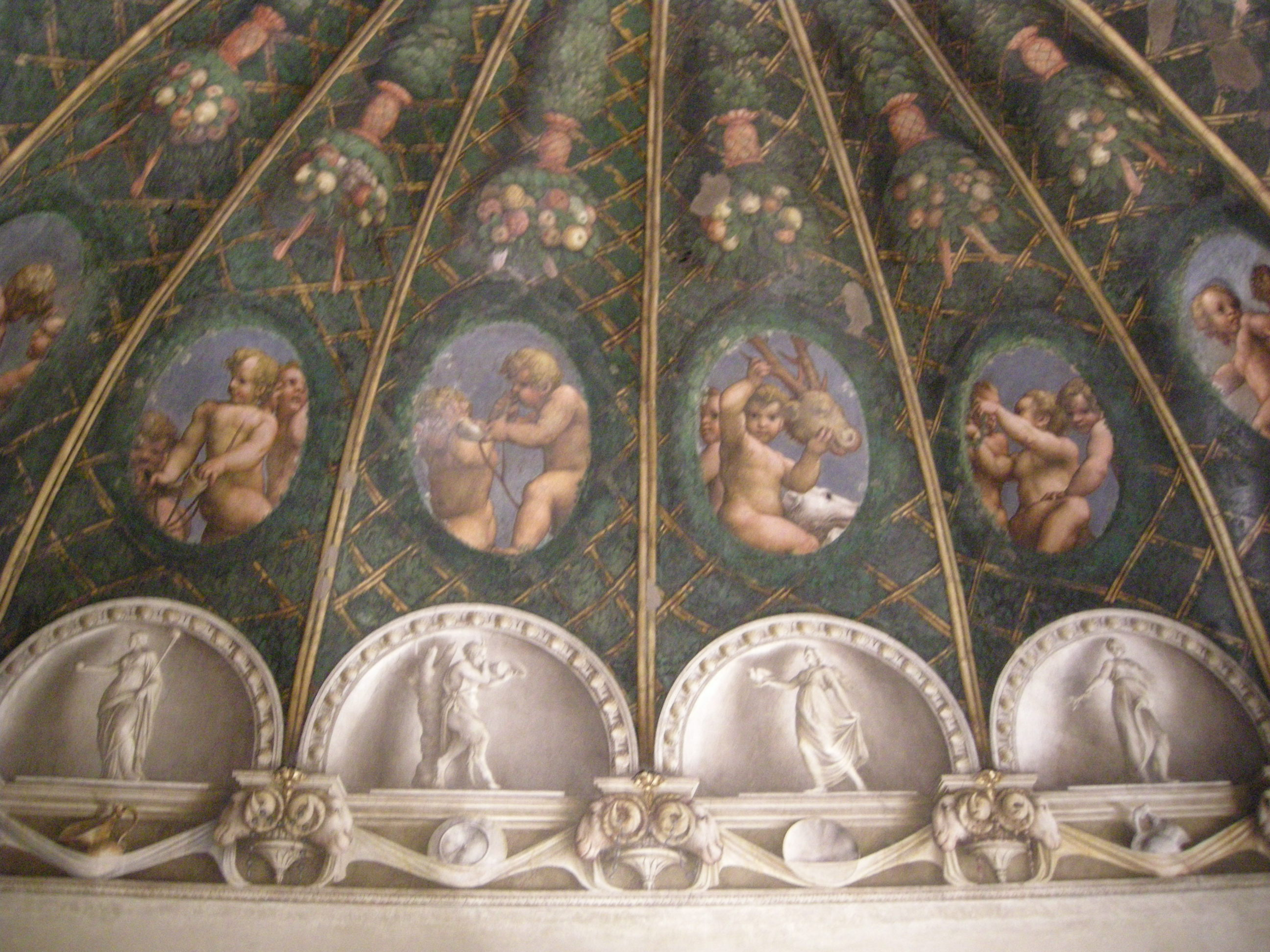
View of the western wall.

== Description ==
The chamber was originally part of a complex of six rooms, forming the personal apartment of abbess Giovanna Piacenza. The function of the chamber in particular is not known: a studio, a lounge, or a dining room. The base is square (c. 7x6.95 m), and above is a late-Gothic-style vault designed in 1514 by Giorgio da Erba; the walls were originally covered by tapestries.

The vault is an example of illusionistic painting, mimicking a pergola opening to the sky. The ribs of the vault are in turn painted to resemble bamboo, and divide each vault segment in four zones, each corresponding to a wall. At the centre of the vault is the coat of arms of abbess Giovanni, formed by three crescent moons in gilded stucco, around which is a series of knotted pink belts. Festoons of vegetables are connected to the latter, one for each vault sector.

Each festoon ends with an oval opening in which, above a bright sky background, are groups of puttos with symbols of hunting (animals, weapons). Below, along the walls, are trompe-l'œil lunettes depicting statues inside niches, with simulated lighting from below. The lower zone contains a series of ram heads (perhaps a reference to the Aries zodiac sign, the first in Spring) connected by painted drapery, which in turn support objects such as plates, vases and others. Finally, above the fireplace, Correggio painted the Roman goddess Diana on a chariot, towed by deer. The goddess (a symbol of purity) is both an allusion to Giovanna's personal qualities, and, as the goddess of the Moon, to her coat of arms.

The architrave of the fireplace has the Latin inscription "IGNEM GLADIO NE FODIAS", meaning "Do not disturb the flame with sword": an assertion of the abbess' independence from the ecclesiastical authorities who were disputing her tenure of the convent.

The private room of the abbess was frescoed (1514) by Alessandro Araldi with grotteschi. The rooms are open to the public as a museum.
