= Venus and Cupid with a Satyr =

Painting by Antonio da Correggio

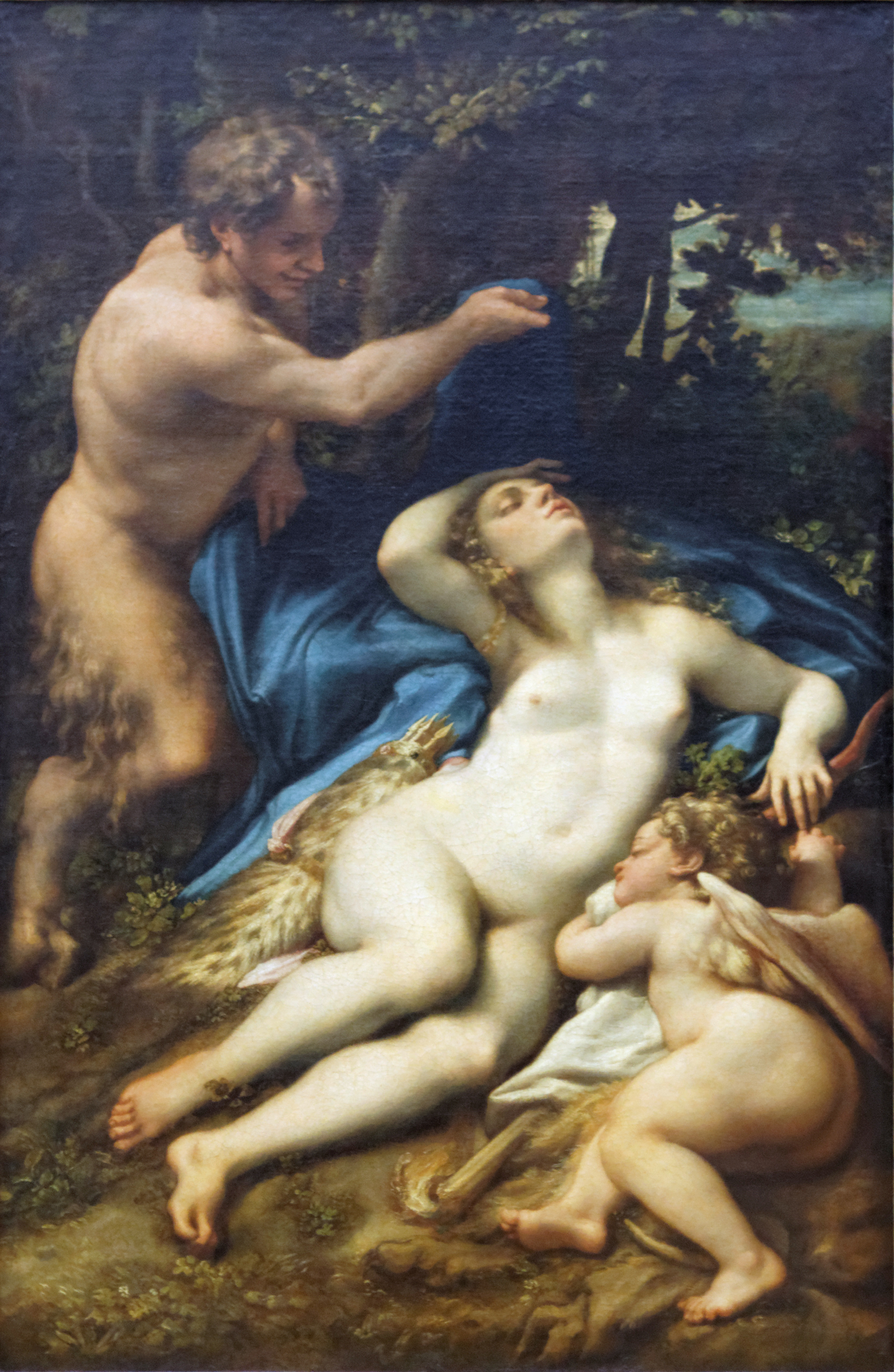
- Artist: Antonio da Correggio
- Year: c. 1528
- Medium: Oil on canvas
- Dimensions: 188.5 cm × 125.5 cm (74.2 in × 49.4 in)
- Location: Musée du Louvre

Venus and Cupid with a Satyr (around 1524-1527) is a painting by the Italian High Renaissance artist Antonio da Correggio. It is now in the Musée du Louvre in Paris.

== Background ==
This painting was in the 16th century in the private collection of count Nicholas Maffei. It is very likely that one of the members of the Maffei family has commissioned two paintings that they then arrived in the 17th century in the collection of the Gonzaga family, with whom the Maffei were relatives. In fact, the son of count Nicholas Maffei, count Frederick Maffei, married Isabel, daughter of Cardinal Ercole Gonzaga.

== Description ==
The work depicts Venus sleeping with her son Eros. Behind them, a satyr is caught while discovering the goddess. The picture is often also seen as portraying Jupiter and Antiope as, according to mythology and Ovid, Jupiter had turned himself into a satyr to rape the nymph.

The painting was probably connected to Correggio's Venus with Mercury and Cupid (The School of Love), now in the National Gallery of London. It, or a copy of it, can be seen in the 1628 painting of the gallery of Cornelis van der Geest, by Willem van Haecht.

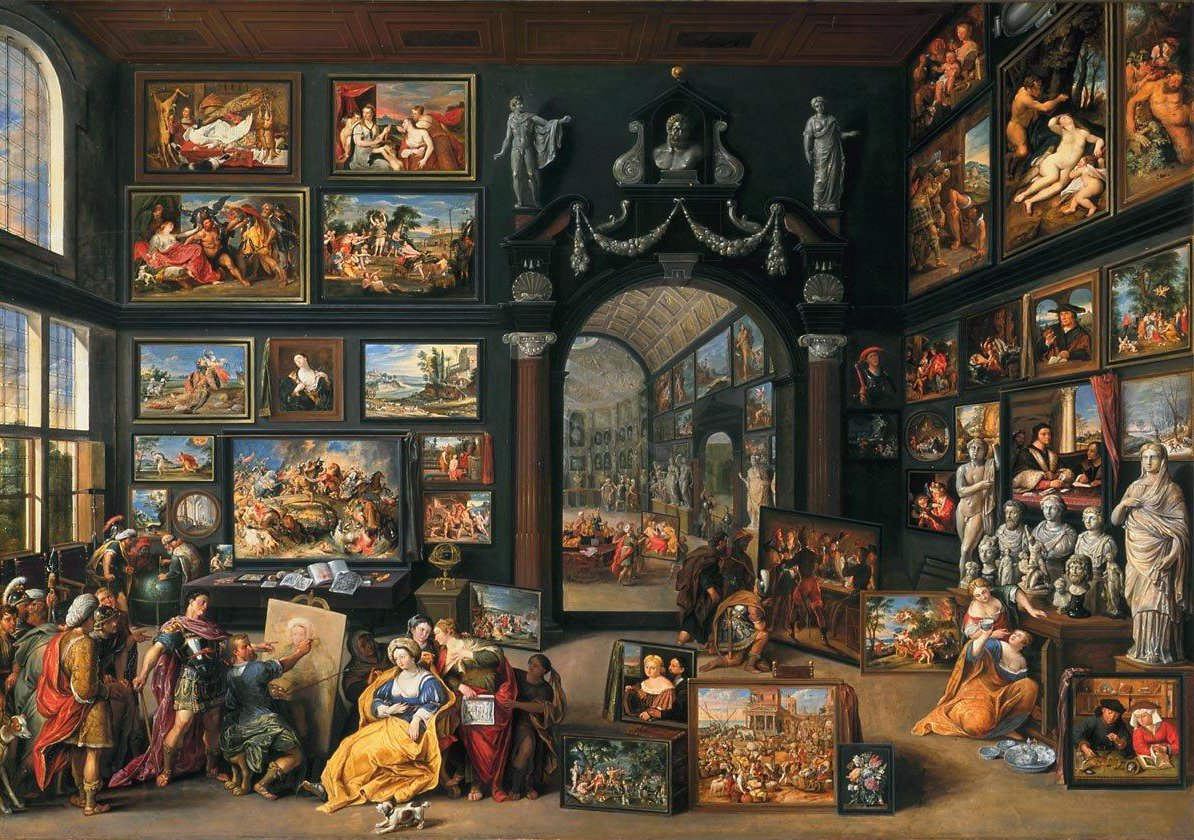
The Gallery of Cornelis van der Geest, by Haecht, shows this painting on the right wall.
