= List of artworks in the Gonzaga collection =

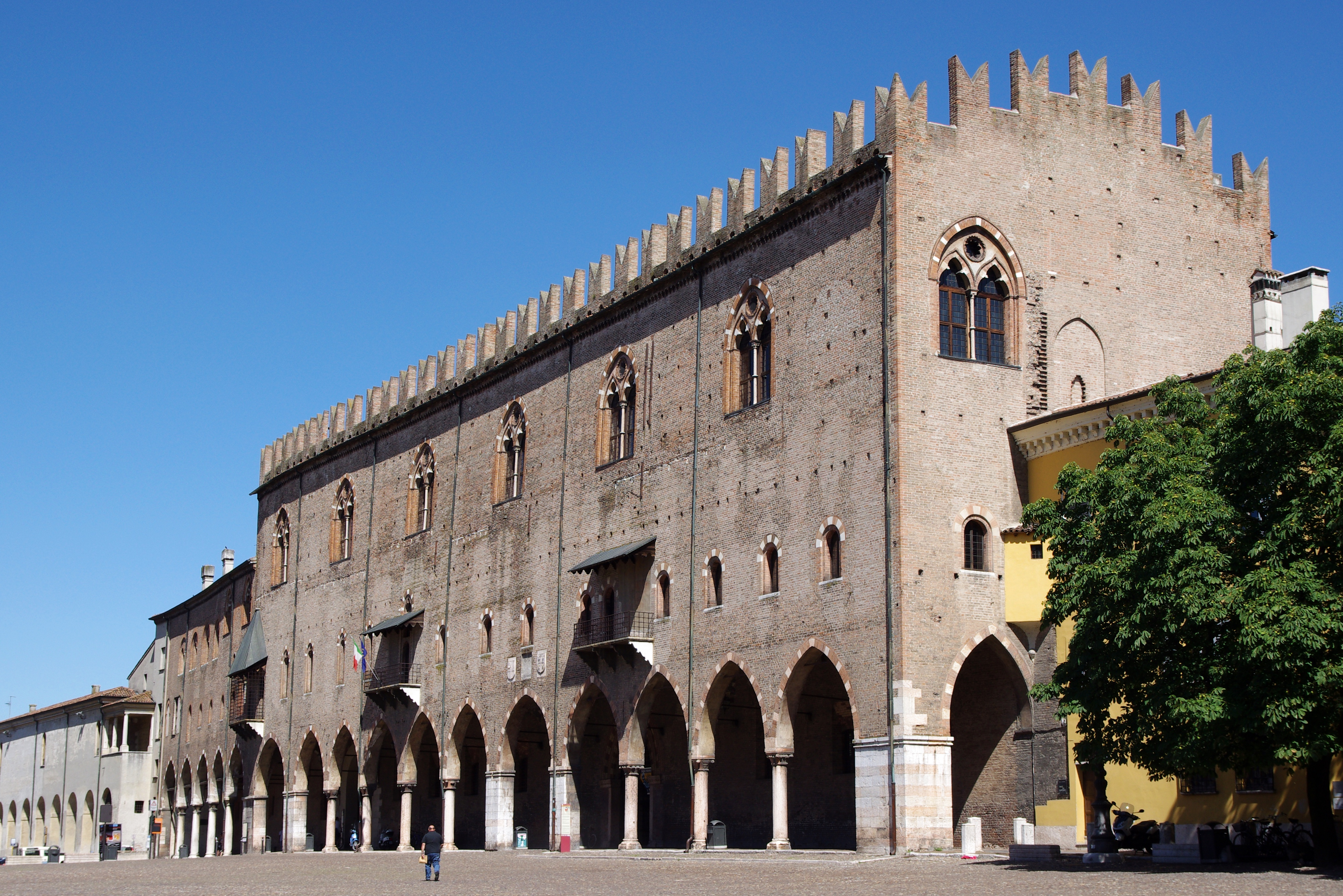
Mantua, Palazzo Ducale

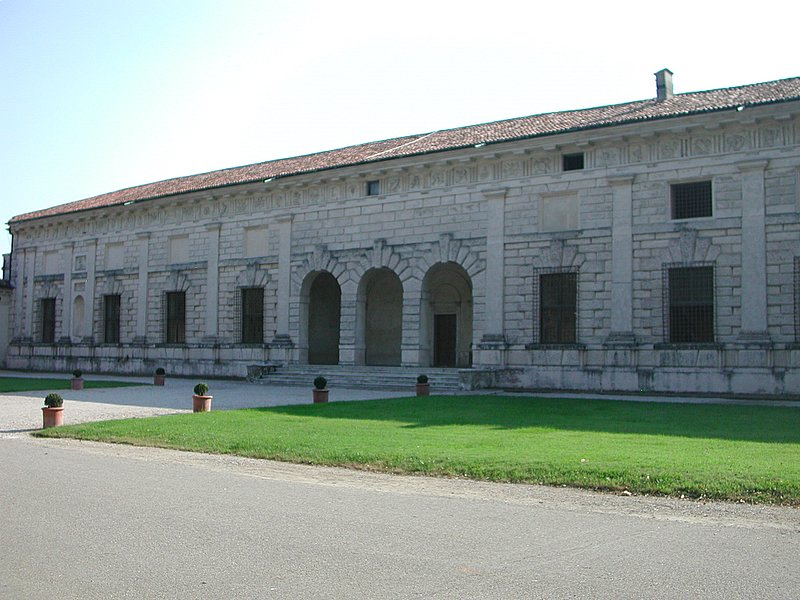
Mantua, Palazzo Te

The Gonzaga Collection or Celeste Gallery (la Celeste Galeria) was the large collection of artworks commissioned and acquired by the House of Gonzaga in Mantua, Italy, exhibited for a time in the Palazzo Ducale, the Palazzo Te, the Palazzo San Sebastiano and other buildings in Mantua and elsewhere.

The Gonzagas were inspired by the wunderkammer style of collecting practised by the princes of Bavaria, with Isabella d'Este in particular creating a noted private 'studiolo'. They set an example for other European courts, particularly in their patronage of contemporary artists, whilst their collecting increased the international profile of Mantua, a relatively small state. It reached its peak under Vincenzo I Gonzaga and his son Ferdinando, before the family's decline led to major losses from the collection, such as the long negotiations from 1625 onwards with Charles I of Great Britain, mediated by two members of the Whitehall Group – the Flemish art dealer Daniel Nys and Nicholas Lanier, Master of the King's Music. These culminated in 1627 with most of the Gonzaga collections being sent to London. This ensured their preservation, unlike the artworks still in Mantua when the city was sacked in 1630.

Its works are now split between museums and private collections across the world, as shown by the 2002–2003 exhibition Gonzaga. La Celeste Galeria. Il Museo dei Duchi di Mantova at the Palazzo Te and Palazzo Ducale, which included around ninety paintings from the total of approximately 2,000 originally in the collection. As well as paintings, the collection also included decorative work in gold and precious stones such as the Gonzaga Cameo along with natural history specimens or 'mirabilia'.

== List ==
=== A ===
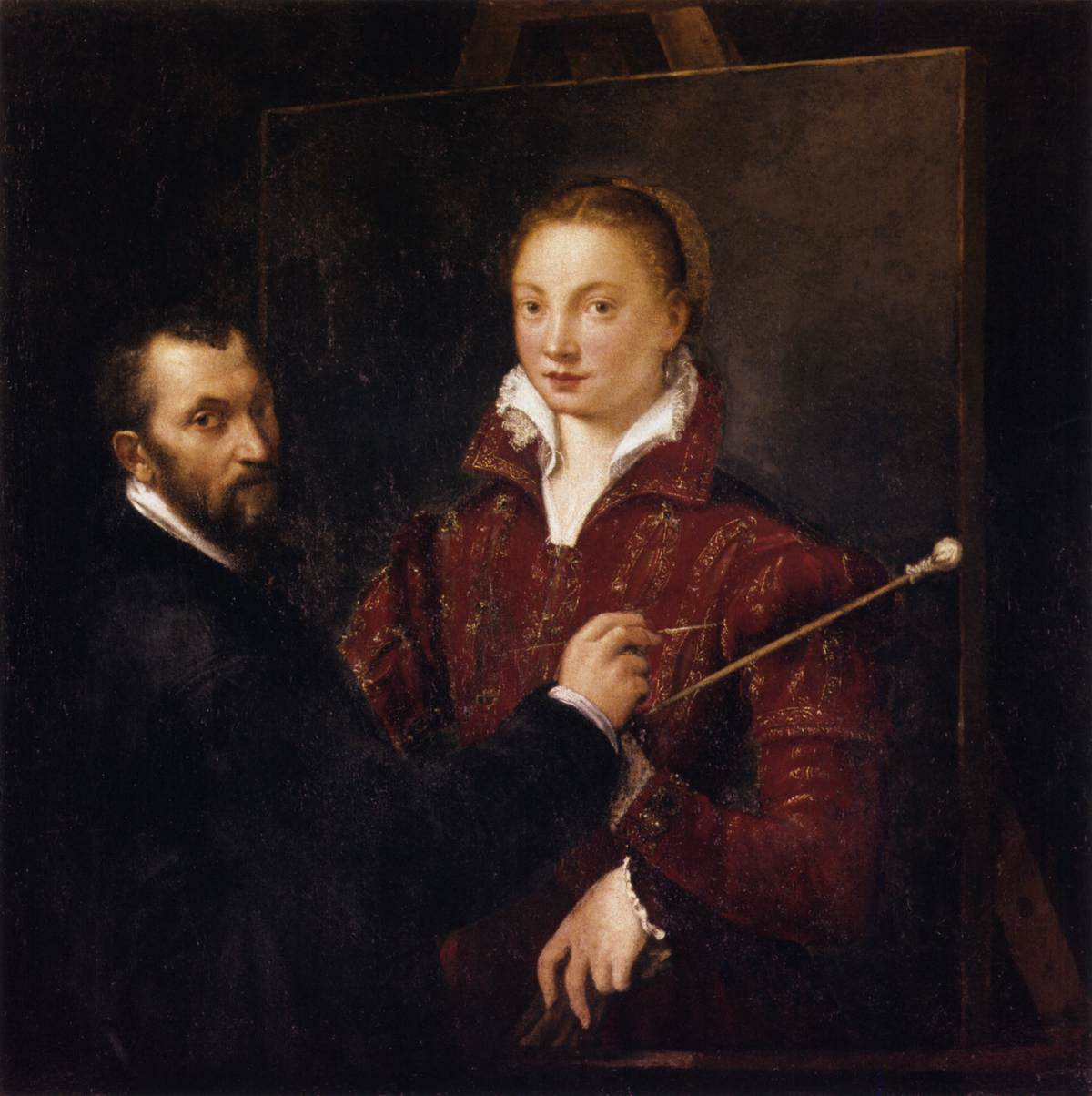
Sofonisba Anguissola, Bernardino Campi painting Sofonisba Anguissola

Anonymous

- Gonzaga Cameo*, classical cameo
- Lely Venus, classical sculpture

Cristofano Allori

- Judith with the Head of Holofernes, 1613, oil on canvas, 120x100 cm, Royal Collection

Sofonisba Anguissola

- Bernardino Campi painting a portrait of Sofonisba Angiussola, c. 1556, oil on canvas, 111×109.5 cm, Siena, Pinacoteca Nazionale
- Self portrait at the easel (?), Lancut, Muzeum Zamet

=== B ===
Giovanni Baglione

- Allegory of Justice and Peace, oil on canvas, 255.3×227 cm, Royal Collection
- Apollo, oil on canvas, 195×150 cm, Arras, Musée des Beaux-Arts
- Calliope, oil on canvas, 195×150 cm, Arras, Musée des Beaux-Arts
- Clio, oil on canvas, 195×150 cm, Arras, Musée des Beaux-Arts
- Erato, oil on canvas, 195×150 cm, Arras, Musée des Beaux-Arts
- Euterpe, oil on canvas, 195×150 cm, Arras, Musée des Beaux-Arts
- Polymnia, oil on canvas, 195×150 cm, Arras, Musée des Beaux-Arts
- Terpsichore, oil on canvas, 195×150 cm, Arras, Musée des Beaux-Arts
- Thalia, oil on canvas, 195×150 cm, Arras, Musée des Beaux-Arts
- Urania, oil on canvas, 195×150 cm, Arras, Musée des Beaux-Arts

Jacopo Bassano

- Christ in the house of Martha, Mary and Lazarus, oil on canvas 98×126.5 cm, Houston, Sarah Campbell Blaffer Gallery

Pieter Bruegel the Younger

- Wedding Feast, oil on panel, 89×112 cm, Dublin, National Gallery of Ireland

=== C ===
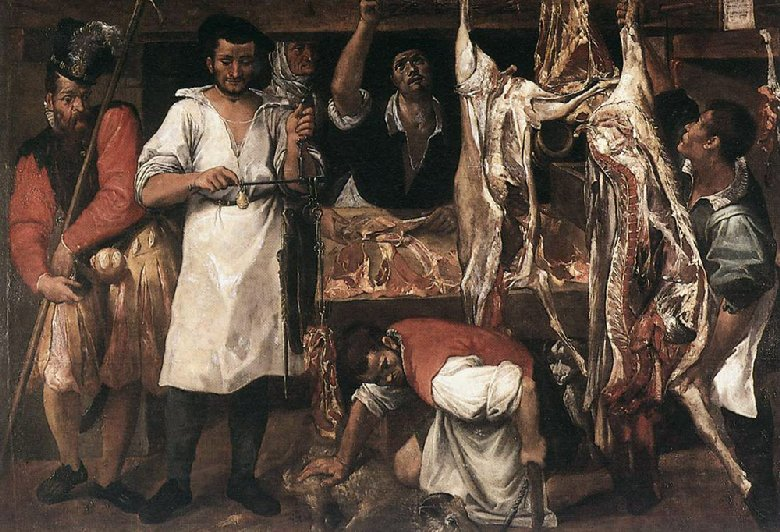
The Butcher's Shop', Annibale Carracci

Annibale Carracci

- The Butcher's Shop, 1582–1583, oil on canvas, 185×266 cm, Oxford, Christ Church Picture Gallery

Ludovico Carracci

- Ecstacy of St Francis, oil on panel, 67×51 cm, Parma, private collection

Correggio

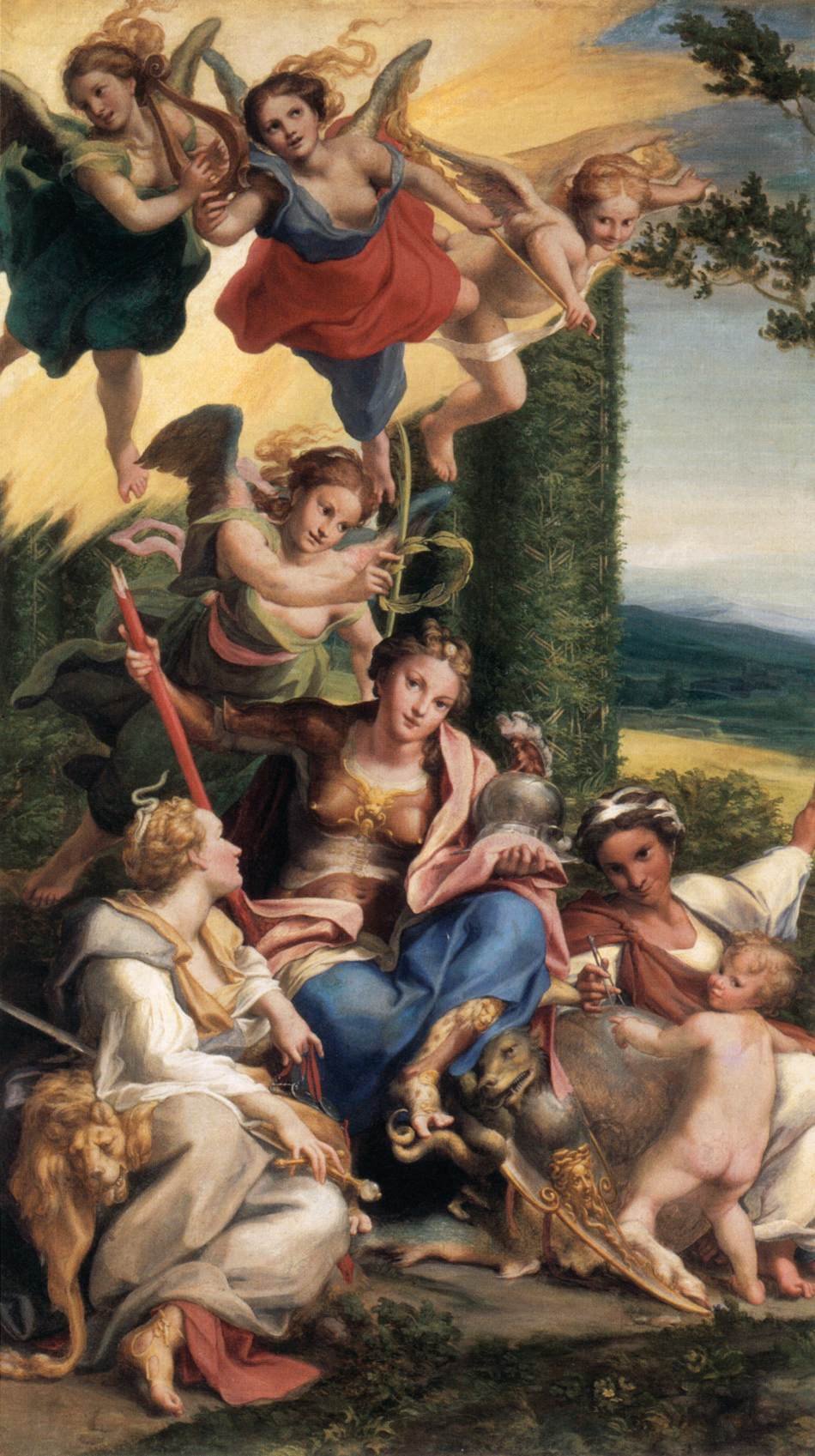
Correggio, Allegory of Virtue

- The School of Love, (1527–1528) oil on canvas, 155.6×91.4 cm, London, National Gallery
- Venus and Cupid with a Satyr, (1523–1525) oil on canvas, 190×124 cm, Paris, Musée du Louvre
- Allegory of Vice , 1532–1534, oil on canvas, 149×88 cm, Paris, Musée du Louvre
- Allegory of Virtue , 1532–1534, oil on canvas, 149×88 cm, Paris, Musée du Louvre
- Holy Family with St Jerome, oil on panel, 68.8×56×1.8 cm, Royal Collection
- Danae, (1531?), oil on panel, 161×193 cm, Rome, Galleria Borghese
- Leda and the Swan, (1531?), olio su tavola, 152×191 cm, Berlin, Staatliche Museen zu Berlin
- Rape of Ganymede, (1531?), oil on panel, 163.5×70.5 cm, Vienna, Kunsthistorisches Museum, Gemaeldegalerie
- Jupiter and Io, (1531?), oil on panel, 163.5×74 cm, Vienna, Kunsthistorisches Museum, Gemaeldegalerie

Lorenzo Costa

- Reign of Comus, 1504, oil on panel, 160×192 cm, Paris, Musée du Louvre
- Isabella d'Este in the kingdom of Harmonia or Allegory of the coronation of Isabella d'Este, 1505, oil on panel, 164.5×197.5 cm, Paris, Musée du Louvre
- Portrait of a woman with a dog, c. 1500, oil on panel, 45.5×35.1 cm, Royal Collection
- Madonna and Child, c. 1500, painting on panel, 71×55 cm, London, private collection

Lucas Cranach (after)

- Lucretia, oil on panel, 42×27.7 cm, Siena, Pinacoteca Nazionale

=== D ===
Domenichino (born Domenico Zampieri)

- Rinaldo and Armida, oil on canvas, 121×167 cm, Paris, Musée du Louvre
- Sant'Agnese, oil on canvas, 212.7×152.4 cm, Royal Collection

Ludovico Dondi

- Julius Caesar in his triumphal chariot, oil on copper, 19.5×18.5 cm, Munich, Alte Pinakothek
- Men carrying booty and trophies of royal armour, oil on copper, 18.5×10 cm, Munich, Alte Pinakothek
- Men carrying booty, trumpeters and sacrificial bulls, oil on copper, 19.5×16.5 cm, Munich, Alte Pinakothek
- Prisoners and standard bearers, oil on copper, 19.5×19 cm, Munich, Alte Pinakothek
- Trophies, war machines, inscriptions and representations of defeated cities, oil on copper, 20×18 cm, Munich, Alte Pinakothek

=== F ===
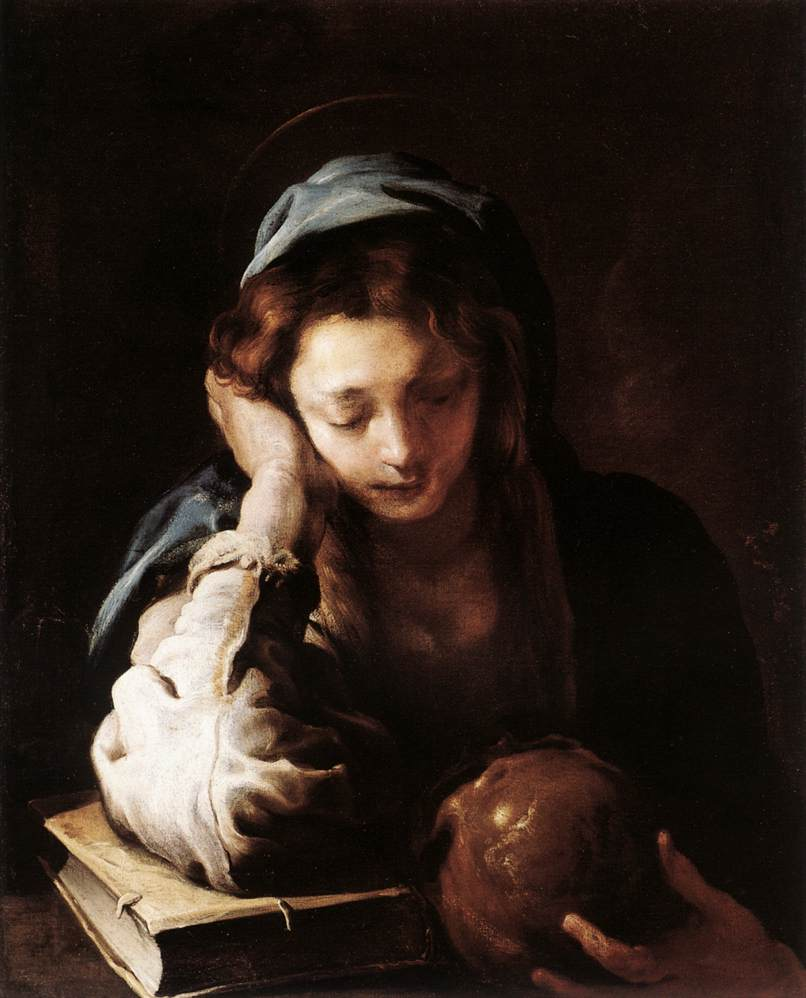
Domenico Fetti, The Penitent Magdalene

Domenico Fetti

- Christ in the Garden, oil on canvas, 90.5×55.5 Prague, National Gallery
- Elijah Triumphing over the Prophets of Baal, oil on panel, 61.2×70.5, Royal Collection
- Sage-seed greenhouse, oil on panel, 60.8×44.5, Prague, Castle Gallery
- Margherita Gonzaga receiving the model of the Church of S.Orsola, 1619–1623, oil on canvas, 245×276 cm, Mantua, Museo del Palazzo Ducale
- Portrait of an astronomer, oil on canvas, 98×73.5, Dresden, Gemaldegalerie
- Posthumous portrait of Federico II Gonzaga, I Duke of Mantua, oil on canvas, 99×88, Vienna, Kunsthistorisches Museum, Gemaeldegaleire
- Vision of St Peter, oil on panel, 66×51, Vienna, Kunsthistorisches Museum
- The Penitent Magdalene, 1617–21, oil on canvas, 98×78.5 cm, Rome, Galleria Doria Pamphilj

Lavinia Fontana

- Portrait of Antonietta Gonzalus, 1594–1595, oil on panel, 57×46 cm, Blois, Musée du Chateau
- The Queen of Sheba Visiting King Solomon, Dublin, National Gallery of Ireland

=== G ===
Lorenzo Garbieri

- Circe, oil on panel, 66×52 cm – Pinacoteca Nazionale di Bologna

Garofalo

- The Holy Family with the Infant St John the Baptist and St Elisabeth, oil on panel, 47.5×32 cm, London, Courtauld Institute of Art

Guercino

- Erminia among the shepherds, oil on canvas, 149×178 cm, Birmingham (UK), Birmingham Museum & Art Gallery

=== L ===
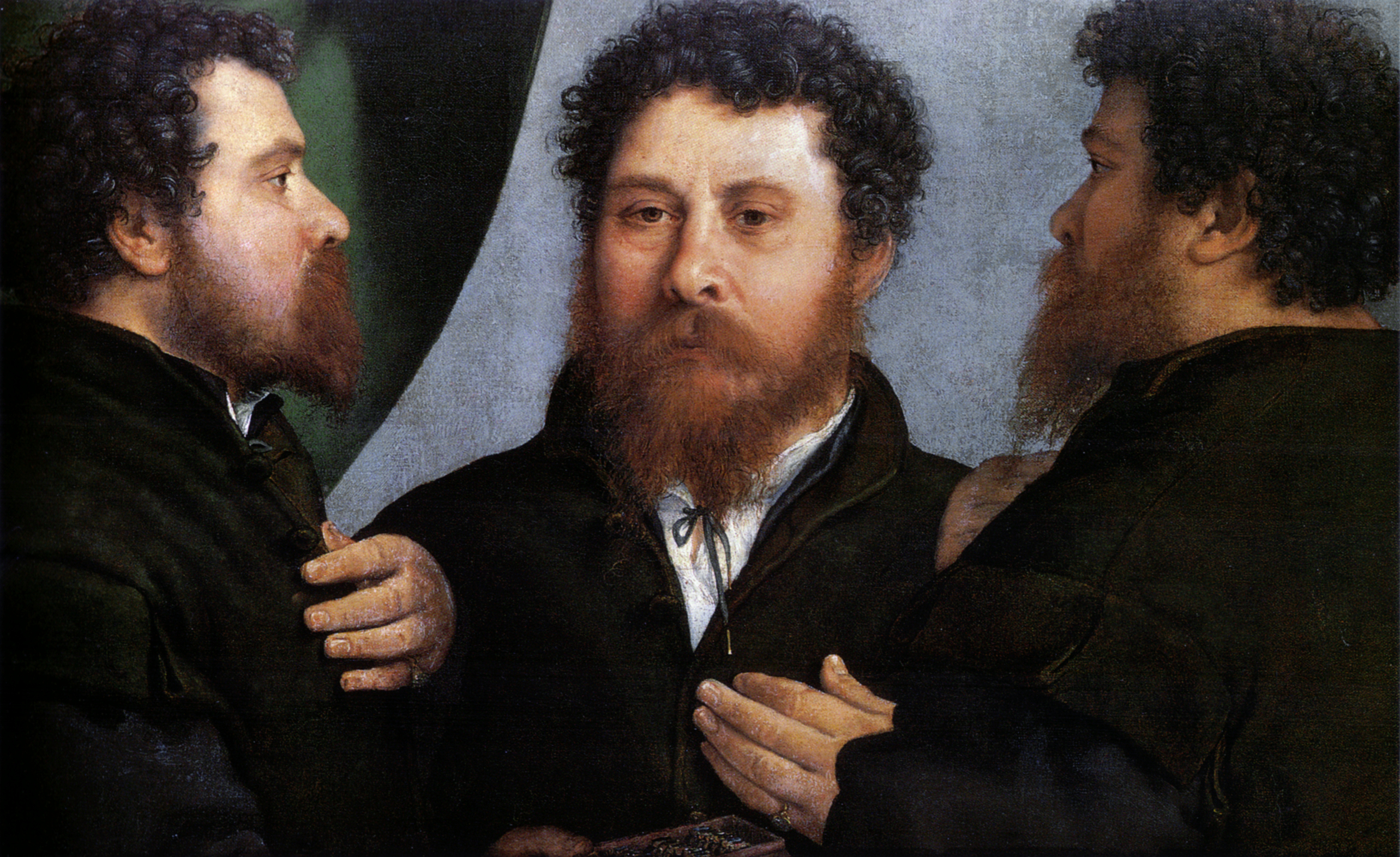
Triple portrait of a goldsmith, Lorenzo Lotto

Lorenzo Lotto

- Triple portrait of a goldsmith, c. 1530, 52.1×79.1 cm, Vienna, Kunsthistorisches Museum

=== M ===
Andrea Mantegna

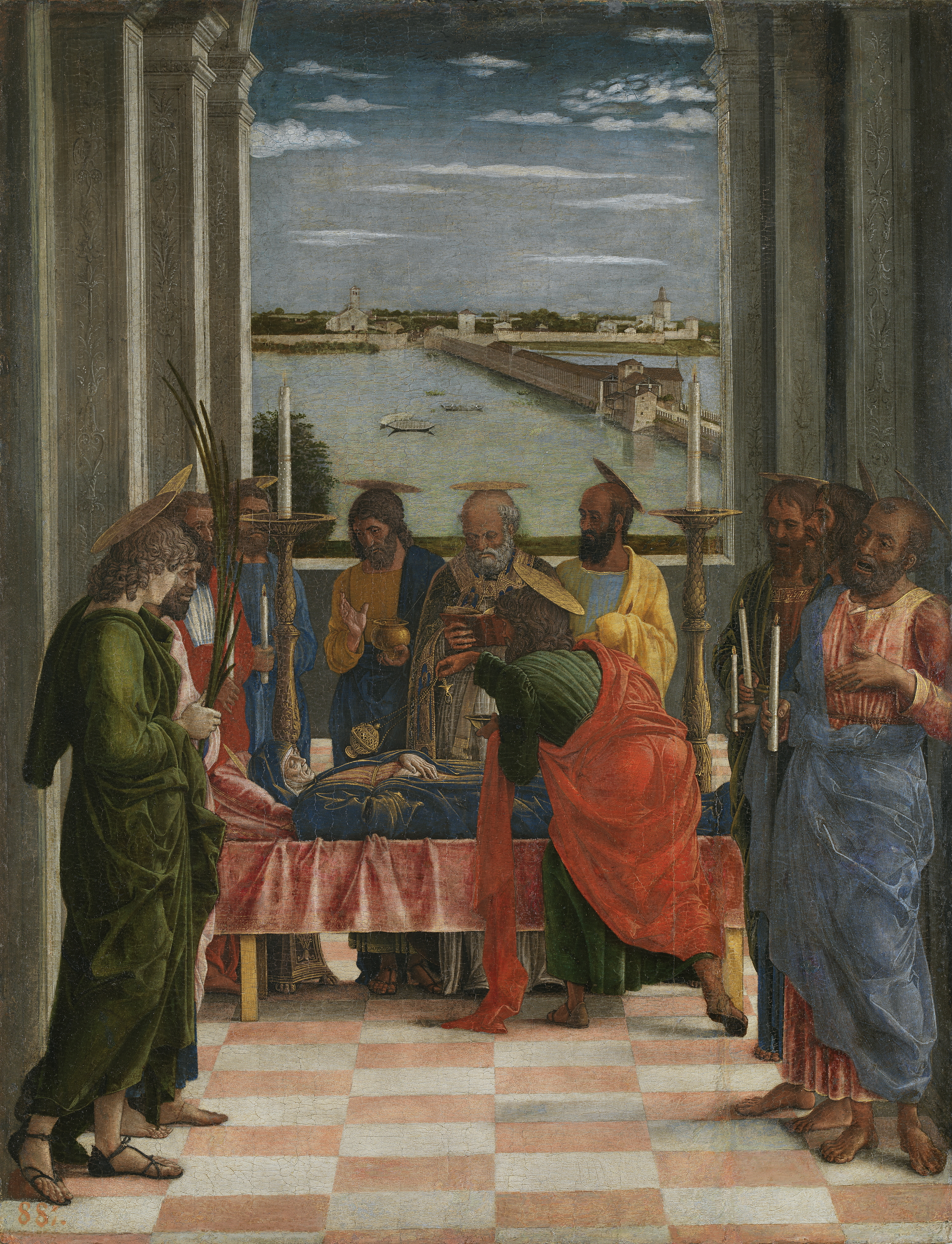
Andrea Mantegna, Death of the Virgin

- Death of the Virgin, c. 1462, tempera and gold on canvas, 54×42 cm, Madrid, Museo del Prado
- Christ Bearing the Soul of the Virgin, 1462, tempera on panel, 27.5×17.5 cm, Ferrara, Pinacoteca Nazionale
- Portrait of Francesco Gonzaga, 1460–1462, tempera on panel, 25.5×18 cm, Naples, Museo Nazionale di Capodimonte
- Uffizi Triptych, c. 1464, tempera on panel, 161.5×86 cm, Florence, Galleria degli Uffizi
- The Dead Christ, c. 1475–1478, tempera on canvas, 68×81 cm, Milan, Pinacoteca di Brera
- Triumphs of Caesar, 1486–1492, nine canvases, each 3m by 3m, Royal Collection (Hampton Court)
- Christ as the Suffering Redeemer, 1488–1500, tempera on panel, 78×48 cm, Copenhagen, Statens Museum for Kunst
- Sibyl and Prophet, 1495–1500, tempera on canvas, 58.4×51.1 cm, Cincinnati, Cincinnati Art Museum
- Sophonisba, 1495–1500, egg tempera on panel, 72.1×19.8 cm, London, National Gallery
- Dido, 1495–1500, glue tempera and gold on linen canvas, 65.3×31.4 cm, Montreal, Montreal Museum of Fine Arts
- Judith, 1495–1500, glue tempera and gold on linen canvas, 65×31 cm, Montreal, Montreal Museum of Fine Arts
- Tuccia, 1495–1500, egg tempera on panel, 72.5×23 cm, London, National Gallery
- Mars and Venus, 1497, tempera on canvas, 160×192 cm, Paris, Musée du Louvre
- Triumph of Virtue or Minerva Casting out the Vices from the Garden of Virtue, 1499–1502, tempera on canvas, 160×192 cm, Paris, Musée du Louvre
- Madonna of Victory, 1496, tempera on canvas, 280×166 cm, Paris, Musée du Louvre

Michelangelo

- Sleeping Cupid, sculpture

Domenico Morone

- Battle at the Bonacolsi, c. 1462, oil on canvas, Mantua, Museo del Palazzo Ducale

=== P ===
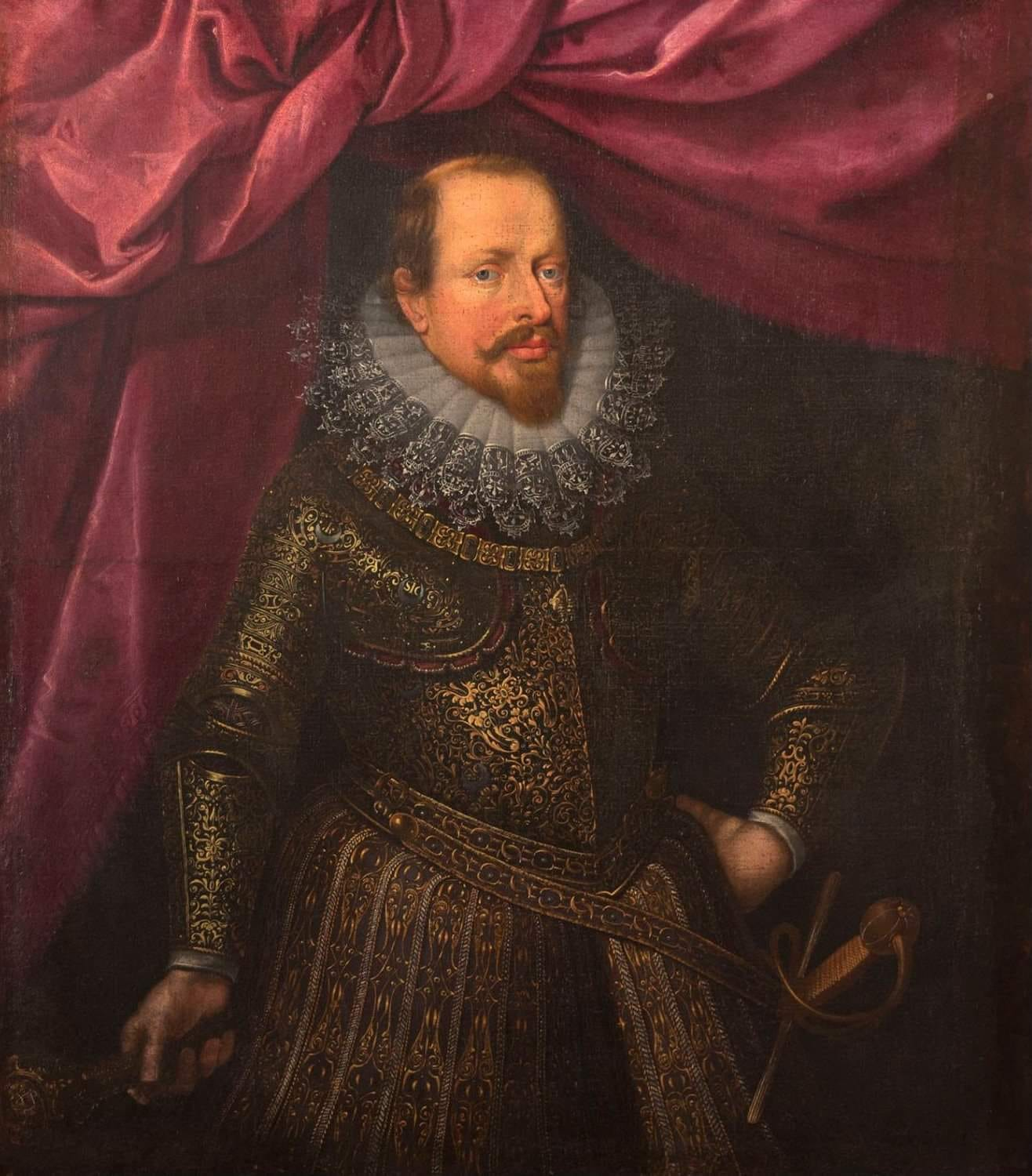
Frans Pourbus the Younger, Portrait of Vincenzo I Gonzaga

Pietro Perugino

- Combat of Love and Chastity or Battle of Chastity against Lust, 1508, oil on canvas, 158×180 cm, Musée du Louvre

Frans Pourbus the Younger

- Full length portrait of Vincenzo I Gonzaga, 1604–1605, oil on canvas, 202×112 cm, Mantua, private collection
- Portrait of Vincenzo I Gonzaga, 1600, oil on canvas, 108×88 cm, Vienna, Kunsthistorisches Museum, Gemaeldegalerie
- Portrait of Margaret of Savoy, Duchess of Mantua, 1605, oil on canvas, 193×115 cm, Florence, Galleria Palatina
- Portrait of Eleonora de' Medici, Duchess of Mantua, 1603, oil on canvas, 84×67 cm, Florence, Galleria Palatina
- Portrait of Vincenzo I Gonzaga, c. 1610, oil on canvas, 114×108.5 cm, Mantua, Palazzo d'Arco
- Portrait of Margaret of Savoy, 1608, oil on canvas, 206.5×116.3 cm, Saint Petersburg, Hermitage Museum

=== R ===
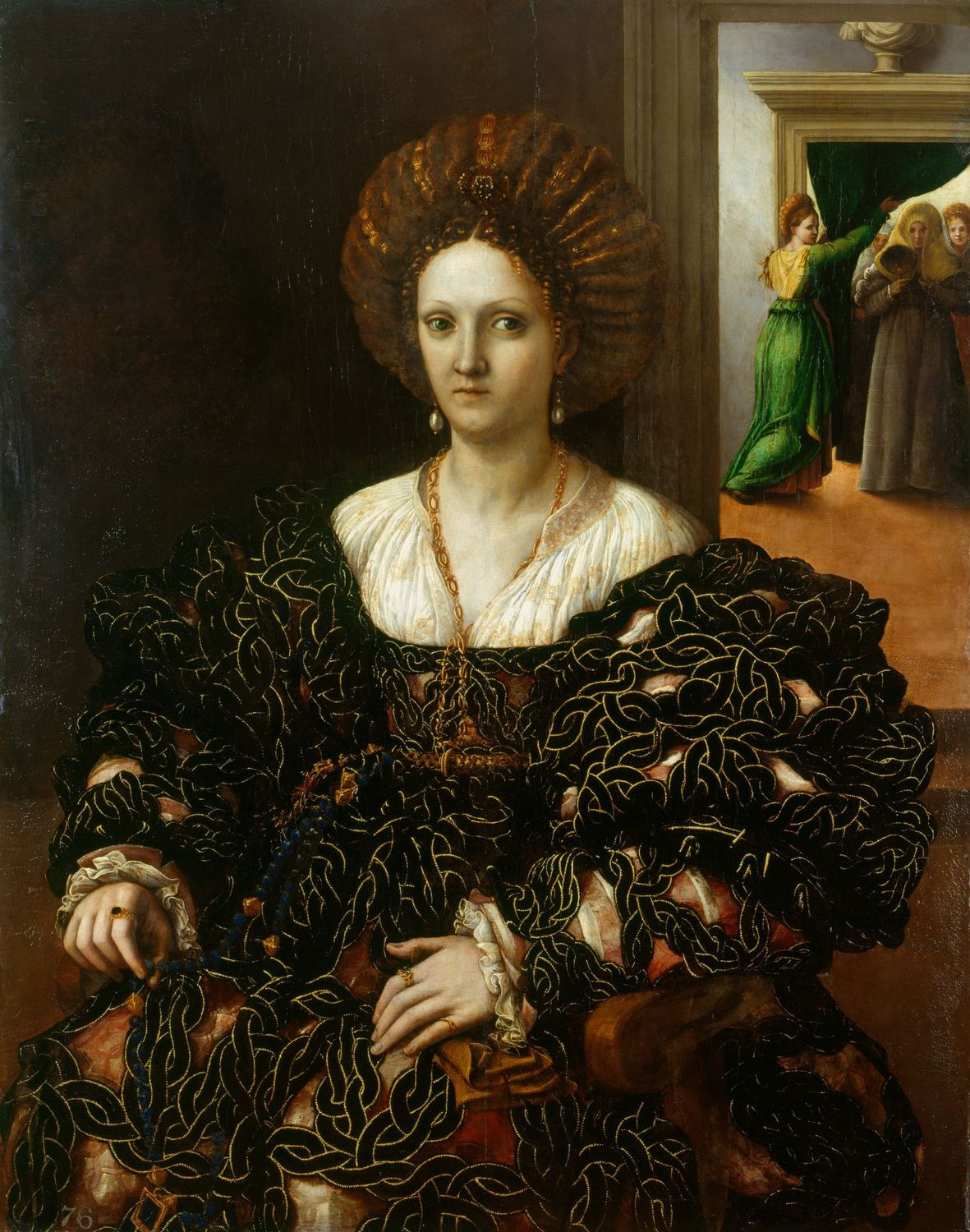
Giulio Romano, Portrait of Margherita Paleologa, Royal Collection, 1531

Guido Reni

- The Labours of Hercules, 1617–1621, a series of four canvases commissioned by Duke Ferdinando Gonzaga, Paris, Musée du Louvre:
  - Hercules on fire
  - Hercules and Archelaus
  - Hercules and the Hydra
  - Nessus raping Deianira

Guido Reni (after)

- The Toilet of Venus, London, National Gallery

Giulio Romano

- Madonna and Child with St Anne, oil on panel, 58×48 cm, frame under construction, Prague, Castle Gallery
- Jupiter, Neptune and Pluto, oil on panel, 110.5×133.4 cm, Mantua, private collection
- Emperor on horseback, oil on panel, 83×54 cm, London, Trafalgar Galleries
- The Birth of Bacchus, oil on panel, 126.5×80 cm, Los Angeles, J. Paul Getty Museum
- La Perla (using drawings by Raphael), c. 1518–1520, oil on canvas, 144×115 cm, Madrid, Museo del Prado
- Portrait of Margherita Paleologa, c. 1531, oil on canvas, 115.5×90.5 cm, Royal Collection

Workshop of Giulio Romano

- Fortune, 1520–1546, oil on canvas, 96.2×49.8 cm, Royal Collection
- Jupiter and Juno taking possession of the throne of Paradise, 1530, oil on canvas, 111×135.5 cm, Royal Collection
- The Theatre of the Caesars: Nero plays while Rome burns, 1536–1539, oil on canvas, 121.5 x 106.7 cm, Royal Collection

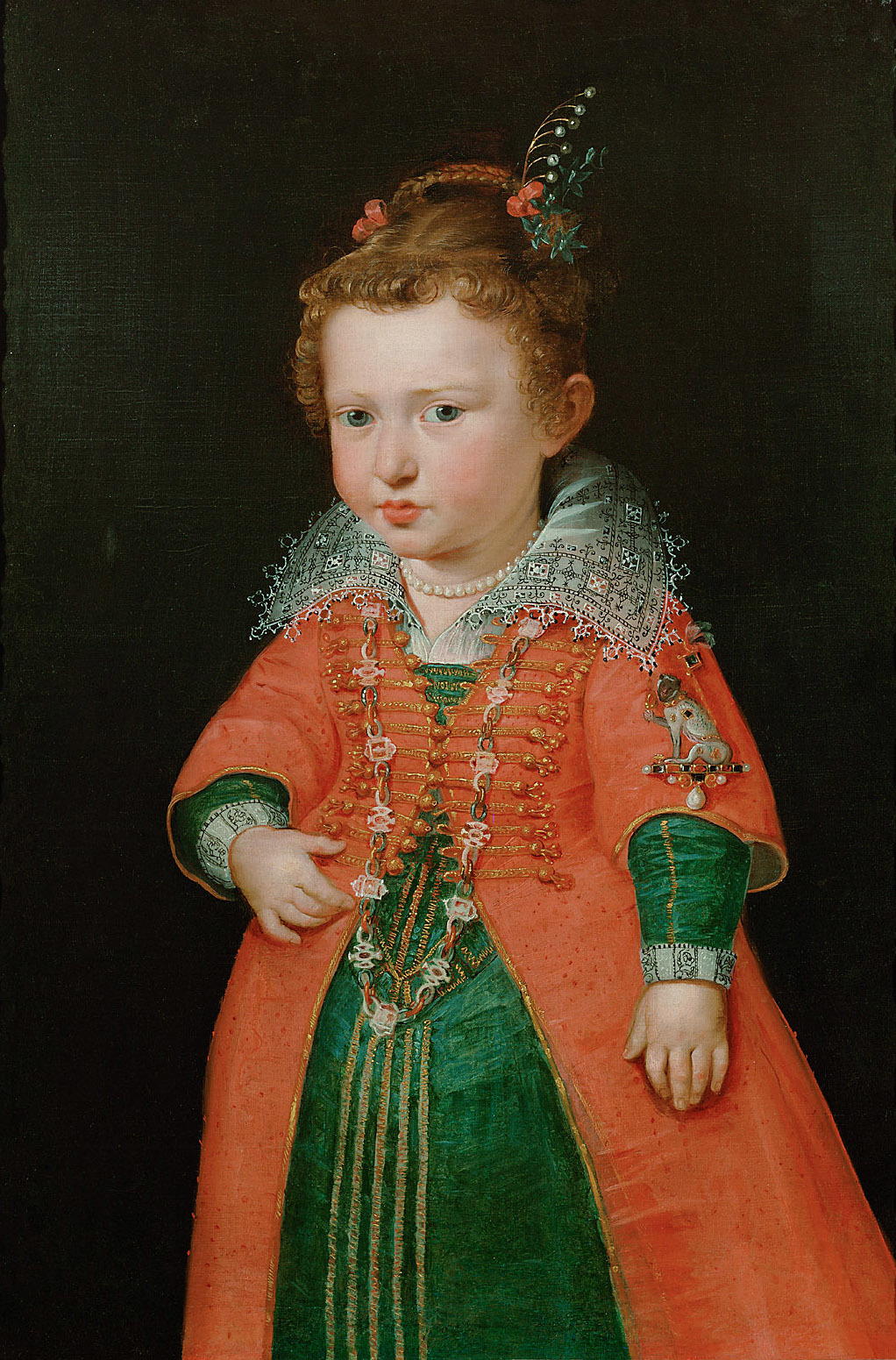
Portrait of Eleonora Gonzaga aged three, Pieter Paul Rubens

Pieter Paul Rubens

- The Gonzaga Family Adoring the Holy Trinity, 1604–1605, oil on canvas, 381×477 cm, Mantua, Museo del Palazzo Ducale
- Self-portrait with friends in Mantua, 1602–1604, oil on canvas, 78×101 cm, Cologne, Wallraf-Richartz Museum of Fine Arts
- Council of the Gods, oil on canvas, 204×379 cm, Prague, Castle Gallery
- Aeneas prepares to lead the Trojan survivors into exile, 1602–1603, oil on canvas, 146×227 cm, Fontainebleau, Musée National du Chateau (stored at the Louvre)
- Portrait of Eleonora I aged two, 76×485 cm, Innsbruck, Ambras Castle
- Portrait of Eleonora Gonzaga aged three, c. 1620, oil on canvas, 76×49.5 cm, Vienna, Kunsthistorisches, Gemaeldegalerie
- Portrait of Ferdinando Gonzaga, oil on canvas, 112×87×12 cm, Bowral, Australia, private collection
- Portrait of Isabella d'Este, 101.8×81 cm, Vienna, Kunsthistorisches Museum, Gemaldegalerie
- Portrait of Maria de' Medici, oil on canvas, 80×60 cm, London, private collection (Mr. Wakhevitch)
- Portrait of Vincenzo II, oil on canvas, 67×51.5 cm, Vienna, Kunsthistorisches Museum, Gemaeldegalerie

=== T ===
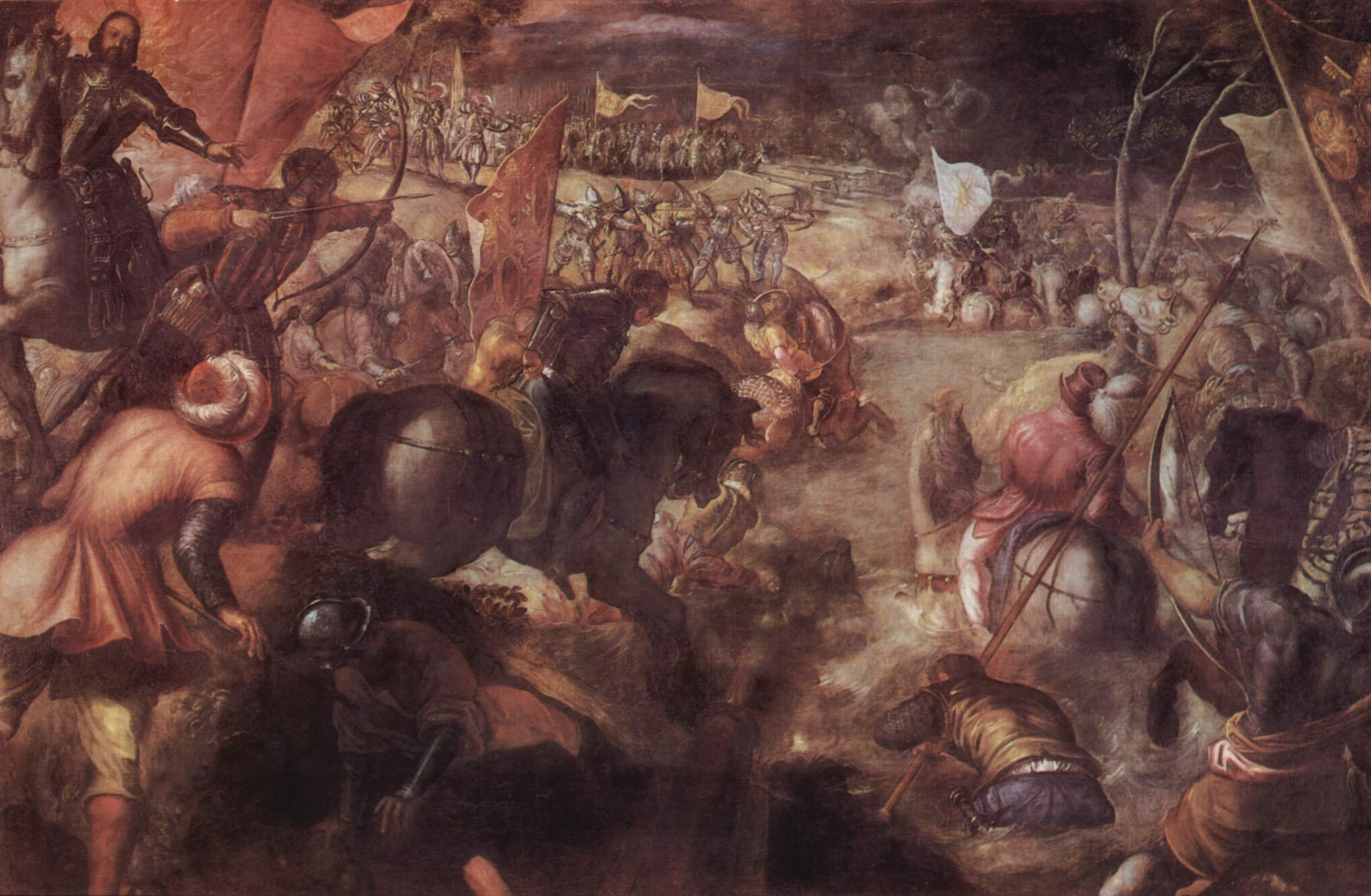
Francesco II Gonzaga at the Battle of Taro, Tintoretto (Jacopo Robusti), 1579

Domenico Tintoretto

- Tancred baptising Clorinda, c. 1585, oil on canvas, 168×115 cm, Houston, Museum of Fine Arts
- Mary Magdalene, Rome, Pinacoteca Capitolina

Jacopo Tintoretto

- Prince Philip II's Entry into Mantua, oil on canvas, 211.7×330 cm, Munich, Alte Pinakothek
- Federico II Gonzaga at the siege of Parma, oil on canvas, 213×276 cm, Munich, Alte Pinakothek
- Francesco II Gonzaga at the Battle of Fornovo on the Taro, oil on canvas, 269×421 cm, Munich, Alte Pinakothek
- Coronation of Marchese Gianfrancesco Gonzaga, oil on canvas, 272×432 cm, Munich, Alte Pinakothek
- Rape of Helen, oil on canvas, 186×307 cm, Madrid, Museo del Prado
- Esther Before Ahasuerus, c. 1546–47, oil on canvas, 59×203 cm, Royal Collection
- The Muses of Music, Royal Collection

Titian

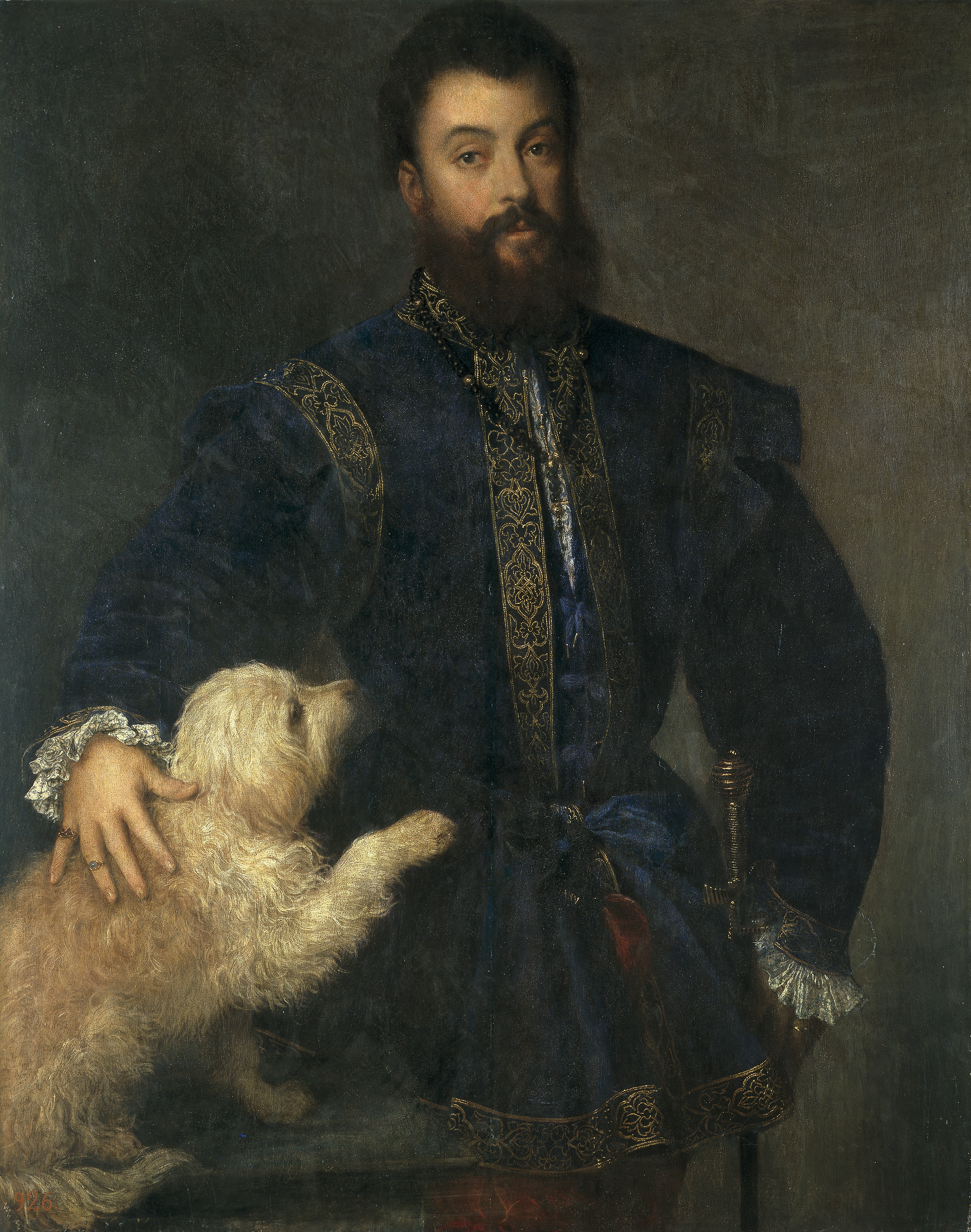
Titian, Portrait of Federico II Gonzaga

- Portrait of Suliman the Magnificent, 99×85 cm, Innsbruck, Ambras Castle
- Woman with a Mirror, c. 1515, oil on canvas, 99×76 cm, Paris, Musée du Louvre
- Tarquin and Lucretia, c. 1515, oil on panel, 84×68 cm, Vienna, Kunsthistoriches Museum, Gemaeldegalerie
- Portrait of Isabella d'Este, 1536, oil on canvas, 102×64 cm, Vienna, Kunsthistoriches Museum, Gemaeldegalerie
- Portrait of Federico II Gonzaga, c. 1529, oil on canvas, 125×99 cm, Madrid, Museo del Prado
- Portrait of Giulio Romano, oil on canvas, 102×87 cm, Mantova, Palazzo Te
- Man with a Glove, c. 1523, oil on canvas, 100×89 cm, Paris, Musée du Louvre
- Portrait of a man, c. 1523, oil on canvas, 118×96 cm, Paris, Musée du Louvre
- The Madonna of the Rabbit, c. 1530, oil on canvas, 71×85 cm, Paris, Musée du Louvre
- The Supper at Emmaus, c. 1540, oil on canvas, 169×244 cm, Paris, Musée du Louvre
- Saint Jerome in Penitence, oil on canvas, 80×102 cm, Paris, Musée du Louvre
- Portrait of Francesco Gonzaga, tempera on panel, 25.5×18 cm, Naples, Museo Nazionale di Capodimonte
- Eleven Caesars, set of eleven works lost in a fire at the Alcazar near Madrid

=== V ===
Various artists (designs by)

- Gonzaga Tapestries*

Veronese

- Judith with the Head of Holofernes, oil on canvas, 111×110 cm, Vienna, Kunsthistorisches Museum

Antonio Maria Viani

- Annunciation to the Virgin Mary, oil on canvas, 54.5×42.5 cm, Siena, Pinacoteca Nazionale

== Bibliography ==
- Raffaella Morselli (ed), La Celeste Galleria, Milan, Skira, 2002.
- Lapenta, Stefania; Morselli, Raffaella (2006). La quadreria nell'elenco dei beni del 1626–1627. Cinisello Balsamo, Milan: Silvana. ISBN 88-8215-427-0.
- Favaretto, Irene (2002). Arte antica e cultura antiquaria nelle collezioni venete al tempo della Serenissima (Riv. e corr. ed.). Roma: "L'Erma" di Bretschneider. ISBN 8882652238.
- Adelaide Murgia, I Gonzaga, Milan, Mondadori, 1972.
