= Allegory of Virtue and Vice =

Allegory of Virtue and Vice may refer to:

- Allegory of Virtue and Vice (Lotto)
- Allegory of Virtue and Vice (Veronese)

== See also ==
- Allegory of Virtue (Correggio)
- Allegory of Vice (Correggio)
