= Portrait of a Jeweler =

Painting by Pontormo

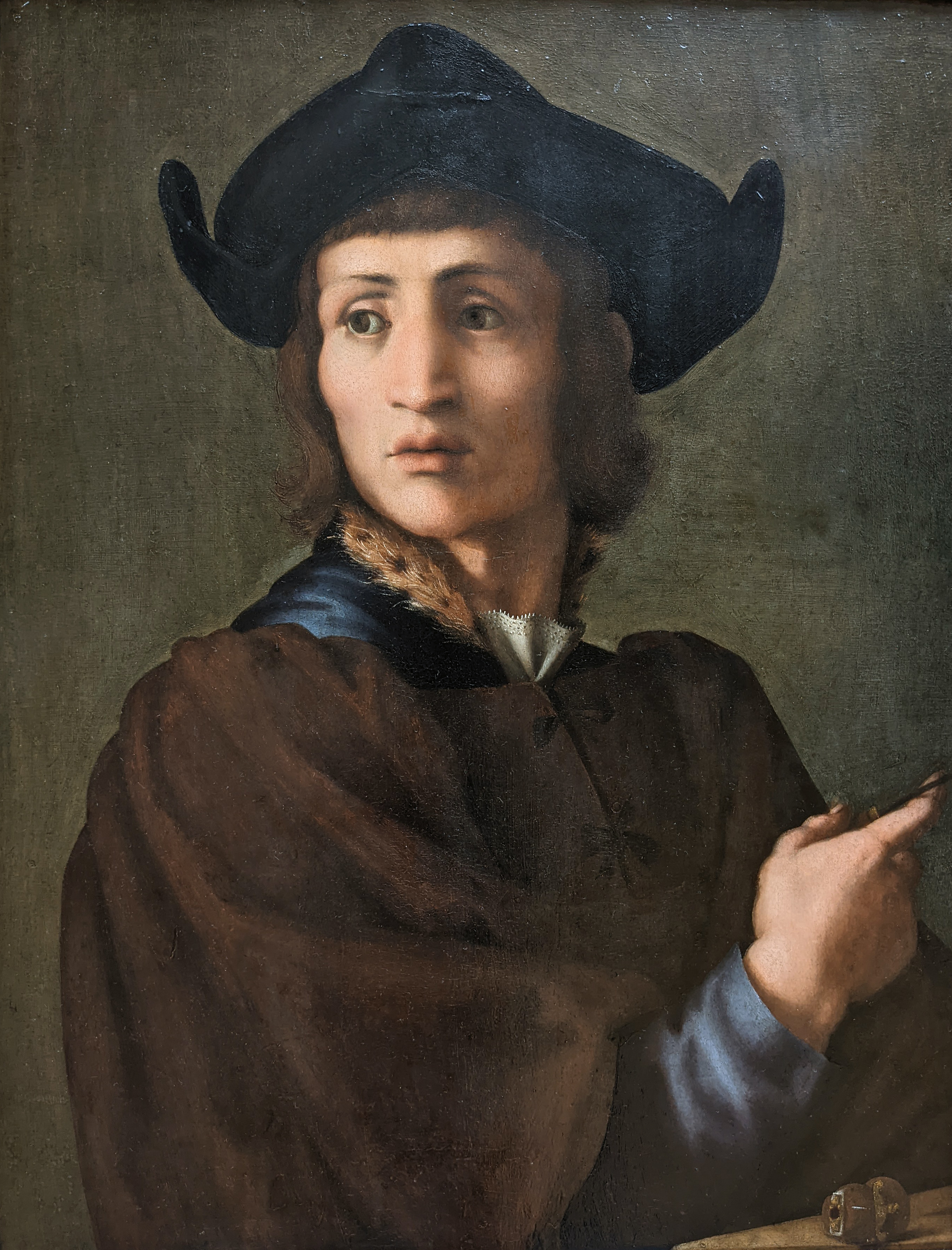
Portrait of a Jeweler (c. 1517–1518) by Pontormo

Portrait of a Jeweler is an oil on panel painting by Pontormo, executed c. 1517–1518. It was acquired from the art dealer Everhard Jabach by Louis XIV in 1671 and is now in the Louvre in Paris.

It may be one of the earliest surviving portraits by the artist and is still close to the style of his master Andrea del Sarto. Its subject's identification as a jeweler is based on the burin he holds and the piece of metal on the table ready to be inlaid with jewels. However, his name is unknown, with past identifications with Giovanni delle Corniole, Michele di Paolo Poggini and Domenico di Polo now disproved.
