= The Battle Between Love and Chastity =

Painting by Pietro Perugino

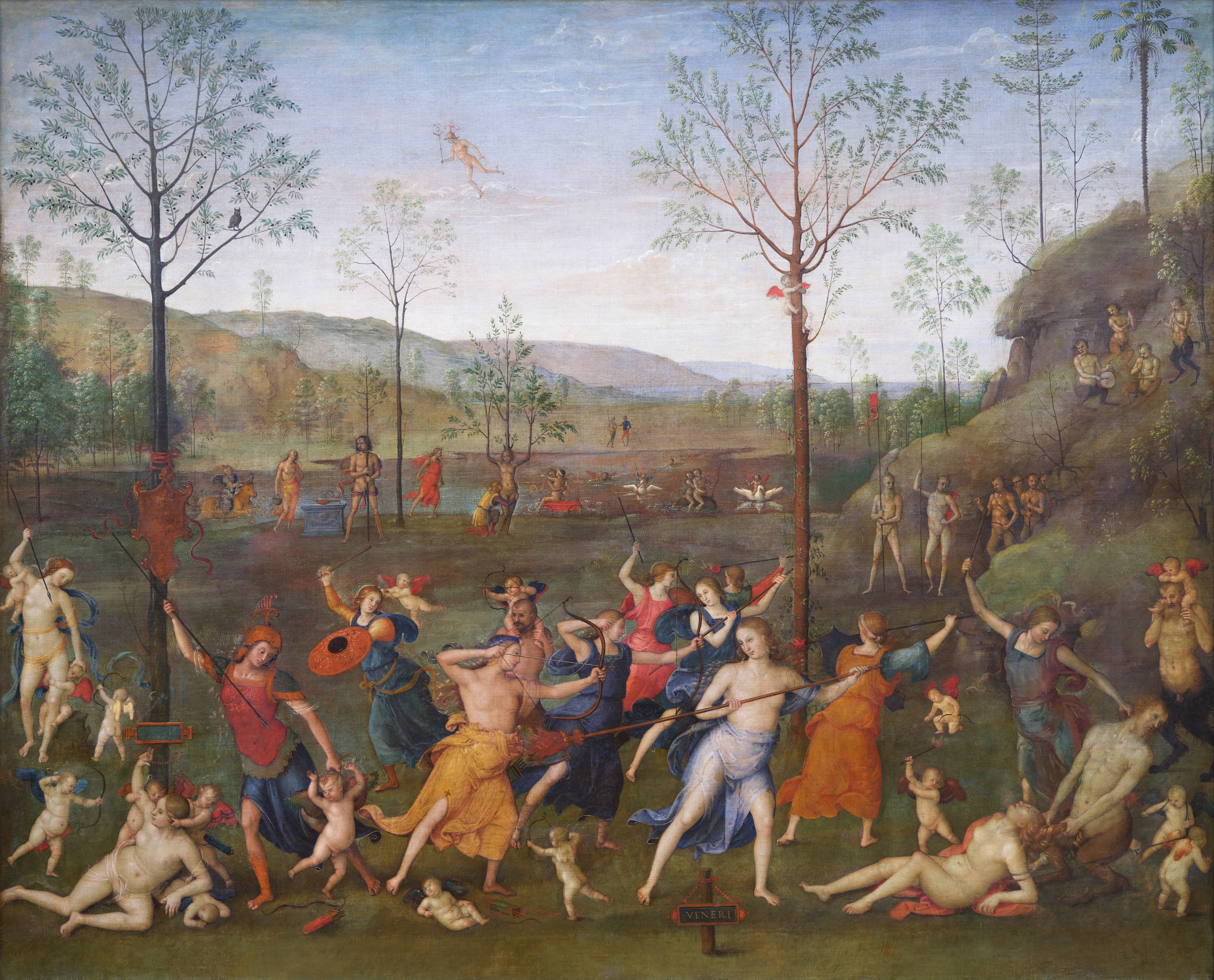
- Artist: Perugino
- Year: 1503
- Medium: Tempera on canvas
- Dimensions: 160 cm × 191 cm (63 in × 75 in)
- Location: Louvre, Paris

The Battle Between Love and Chastity is a painting by the Italian Renaissance artist Pietro Perugino, now in the Musée du Louvre, in Paris, France. It was originally commissioned for the studiolo (cabinet) of Isabella d'Este, Marchesa of Mantua, in the Castello di San Giorgio.

== History ==
The painting was the third commissioned by Isabella d'Este for her studiolo, after the two canvasses by Andrea Mantegna, the Parnassus and the Triumph of the Virtues. The paintings of the Coronation of Isabella d'Este and Reign of Comus would be completed by Lorenzo Costa.

The subject was suggested by Isabella's court poet, Paride da Ceresara, documented by the correspondence between Isabella and Perugino, who was then active in Florence. The notary contract included all the details about the literary theme, as well as a drawing which the work had to be based on. For example, when Perugino painted Venus naked rather than dressed, the marchesa protested vigorously.

In 1505, when the painting was delivered, the marchesa was not entirely satisfied. She declared that she preferred it would have been painted in oil, instead of the tempera used under her directives in order to follow Mantegna's style. Perugino, who probably was not at ease with the small format of the work, received 100 ducats for the work.

After the extinction of the elder branch of the House of Gonzaga, the painting was gifted by Charles I of Nevers to Cardinal Richelieu, and was thus moved to Paris. Later it was acquired by the state and was added to the collection of the Louvre.

== Description ==
The painting, over a background with gently steeped hills, portrays a fight between the symbolic figures of Love and Chastity. The theme was similar to other commissioned for the studiolo. Among the numerous mythological figures are Minerva, Diana, Venus, Anteros, nymphs, fauns and others. In the background are depicted several mythological episodes showing the victory of Chastity over Carnal Love, such as Apollo and Daphne, Jupiter and Europa, Mercury and Glaucera, Polyphemus and Galatea, Pluto and Proserpina, and Neptune with the nymph transforming into a carrion crow.

== Other paintings of Isabella's Studiolo ==
- Allegory of Isabella d'Este's Coronation by Mantegna
- Reign of Comus by Lorenzo Costa
- Triumph of the Virtues by Mantegna
- Parnassus by Mantegna

== Sources ==
- Garibaldi, Vittoria (2004). "Perugino". Pittori del Rinascimento (in Italian). Florence: Scala. ISBN 88-8117-099-X.
