= Venus with Mercury and Cupid =

Painting by Antonio da Correggio

- The School of Love, The Education of Cupid
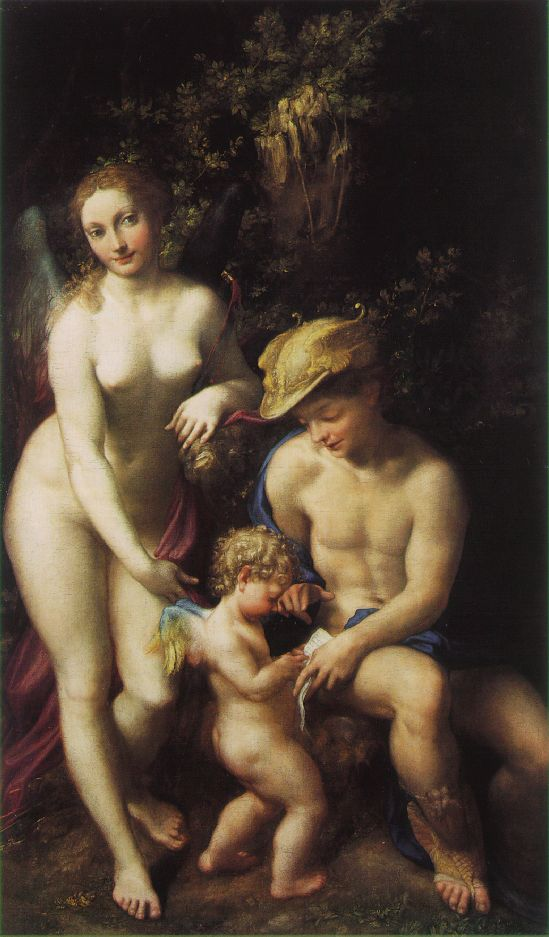
- Artist: Correggio
- Year: c. 1525
- Medium: Oil on canvas
- Dimensions: 155.6 cm × 91.4 cm (61.3 in × 36.0 in)
- Location: National Gallery, London
- Website: www.nationalgallery.org.uk/paintings/correggio-venus-with-mercury-and-cupid-the-school-of-love

Venus with Mercury and Cupid, The School of Love or The Education of Cupid is a c. 1525 painting by the Italian painter Correggio, now in the National Gallery. It depicts the deities Cupid, Mercury, and Venus.

== History ==
A preparatory sketch for it survives in the British Museum. Venus and Cupid with a Satyr (now in the Louvre) seems to be its pendant - that painting is larger but Venus with Mercury and Cupid may have been cut down later. They were probably commissioned by Nicola Maffei (c.1487-1536) and the early fame of Venus with Mercury and Cupid is attested by a copy made by Girolamo Mazzola Bedoli.

However, the first written reference to the two paintings is in 1627, by which time they were in the Gonzaga collection in Mantua (the Maffeis were closely linked to the Gonzagas). Between 1627 and 1628 both paintings were acquired from the Gonzagas by Charles I and it is attested as being in Whitehall Palace in 1639. His collection also contained copies of the painting and its pendant by Peter Oliver, known as Venerie Coeleste (Sacred Love) and Venerie Mundano (Profane Love) respectively.

At the sale of Charles' goods it was valued at £800 and sold on 23 October 1651 to Thomas Bagley, a glazier in the royal household. It was bought in 1653 by the Spanish ambassador Alonso de Cárdenas for 1600 escudos (£400). He was acting as the agent for Luis de Haro, who had planned to present it to Philip IV of Spain. However, when the painting arrived in Madrid Diego Velázquez challenged its attribution to Correggio and Luis decided to keep it for himself.

It was inherited by Luis' son Gaspar de Haro, then by Gaspar's daughter Catalina, wife of Francisco Álvarez de Toledo, 10th Duke of Alba, whose family retained it until 1802. That year the Duchy of Alba was inherited from the Duchess of Alba by the 7th Duke of Berwick and Liria - her relations entered litigation against him, in the course of which Charles IV of Spain ordered that the painting be sold to Manuel de Godoy. De Godoy was arrested six years later, and the painting was confiscated along with the rest of his goods by Joachim Murat, who took it to Naples. After Murat's defeat and execution during the Hundred Days in 1815, his widow Caroline fled to Vienna, taking the painting with her. Later that year she sold it to the future 3rd Marquess of Londonderry. In 1834 Londonderry sold it to the National Gallery in London, where it now hangs.

== Other versions ==
At least four early copies of the painting are known:

- former property of Baron Massias in Paris,
- Ham House, near London, has a copy no doubt made when the painting was in London, now National Trust.),
- former property of Baron Brukenthal in Hermannstadt (now in the Brukenthal National Museum),
- former property of Marguerite Pelouze in the Château de Chenonceau.

At least two versions, those at Sibiu and Chenonceau, are still exhibited as authentic works by Correggio.

== Bibliography ==
- (in Italian) Giuseppe Adani, Correggio pittore universale, Silvana Editoriale, Correggio 2007. ISBN 9788836609772
- Brotton, Jerry, The Sale of the Late King's Goods: Charles I and His Art Collection, 2007, Pan Macmillan, ISBN 9780330427098
