= Parnassus (Mantegna) =

Painting by Andrea Mantegna

- Artist: Andrea Mantegna
- Year: 1497
- Type: Tempera and gold on canvas
- Dimensions: 159 cm × 192 cm (63 in × 76 in)
- Location: Louvre Museum; Paris

The Parnassus is a painting by the Italian Renaissance painter Andrea Mantegna, executed in 1497. It is now in the Musée du Louvre, Paris.

== History ==
The Parnassus was the first picture painted by Mantegna for Isabella d'Este's studiolo (cabinet) in the Ducal Palace of Mantua. The shipping of the paint used by Mantegna for the work is documented in 1497; there is also a letter to Isabella (who was at Ferrara) informing her that once back she would find the work completed.

The theme was suggested by the court poet Paride da Ceresara. After Mantegna's death in 1506, the work was partially repainted to update it to the oil technique which had become predominant. The intervention was due perhaps to Lorenzo Leonbruno, and regarded the heads of the Muses, of Apollo, Venus and the landscape.

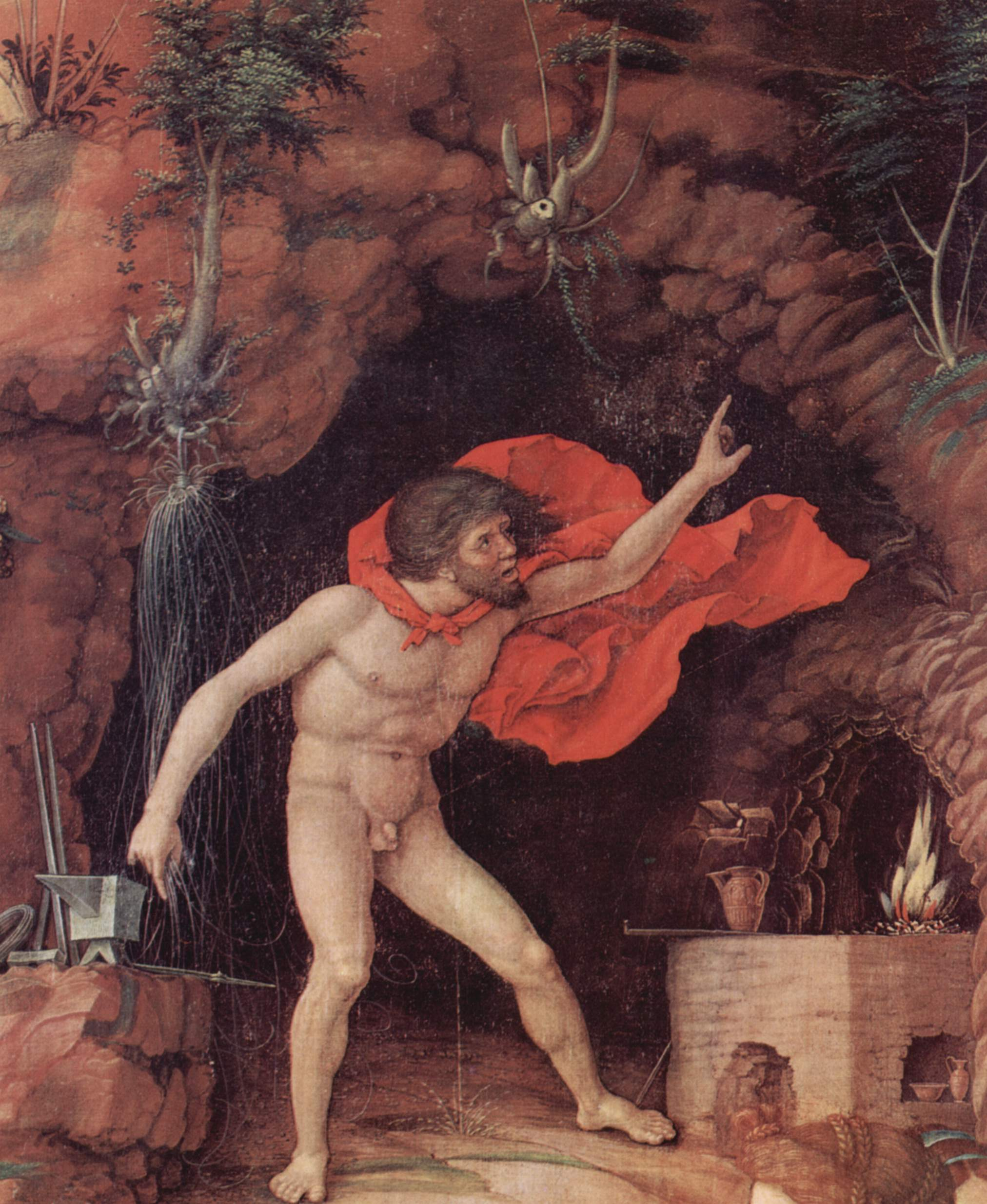
Detail of Vulcan.

Together with the other paintings in the studiolo, it was given to Cardinal Richelieu by Duke Charles I of Mantua in 1627, entering the royal collections with Louis XIV of France. Later it became part of the Louvre Museum.

== Description ==
The traditional interpretation of the work is based on a late 15th-century poem by Battista Fiera, which identified it as a representation of Mount Parnassus, culminating in the allegory of Isabella as Venus and Francesco II Gonzaga as Mars.

The two gods are shown on a natural arch of rocks in front a symbolic bed; in the background the vegetation has many fruits in the right part (the male one) and only one in the left (female) part, symbolizing the fecundation. The posture of Venus derives from the ancient sculpture. They are accompanied by Anteros (the heavenly love), opposed to the carnal one. The latter is still holding the arch, and has a blowpipe which aims at the genitals of Vulcan, Venus' husband, portrayed in his workshop in a grotto. Behind him is the grape, perhaps a symbol of the drunk's intemperance.

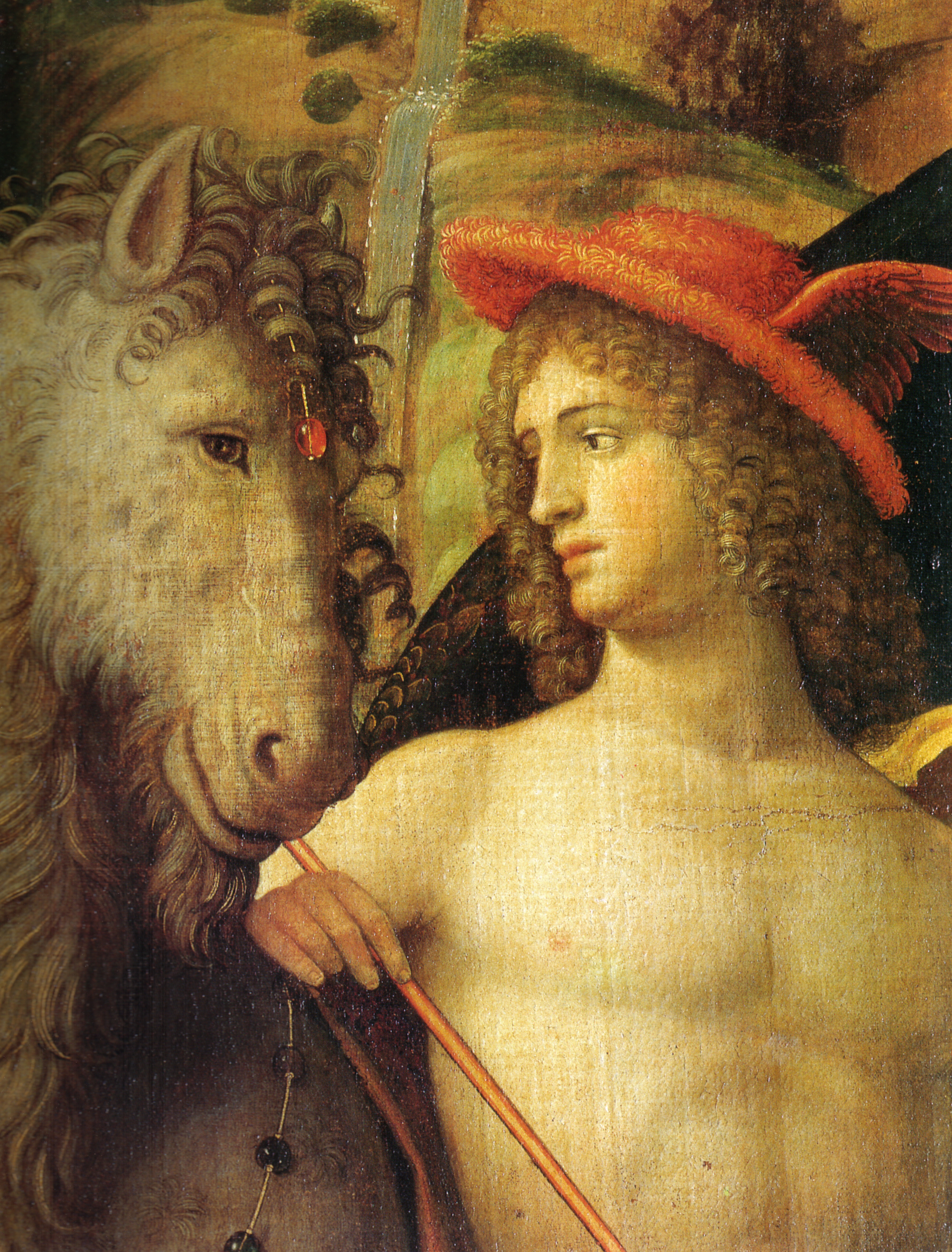
Detail of Pegasus and Mercury.

In a clearing under the arch is Apollo playing a lyre. Nine Muses are dancing, in an allegory of universal harmony. The touch of Pegasus's hoof (right) can generate the spring which fed the falls of Mount Helicon, which can be seen in the background. The Muses danced traditionally in wood of this mount, and thus the traditional naming of Mount Parnassus is wrong.

Near Pegasus is Mercury, with his traditional winged hat, caduceus (the winged staff with entwined snakes), and messenger shoes. He is present to protect the two adulterers.

== Other paintings of Isabella's Studiolo ==
- Allegory of Isabella d'Este's Coronation by Lorenzo Costa
- Reign of Comus by Lorenzo Costa
- Triumph of the Virtues by Mantegna
- Combat of Love and Chastity by Pietro Perugino

== Sources ==
- De Nicolò Salmazo, Alberta (1997). Mantegna. Milan: Electa.
