= Comus =

In Greek mythology, the god of festivity and son of Dionysus

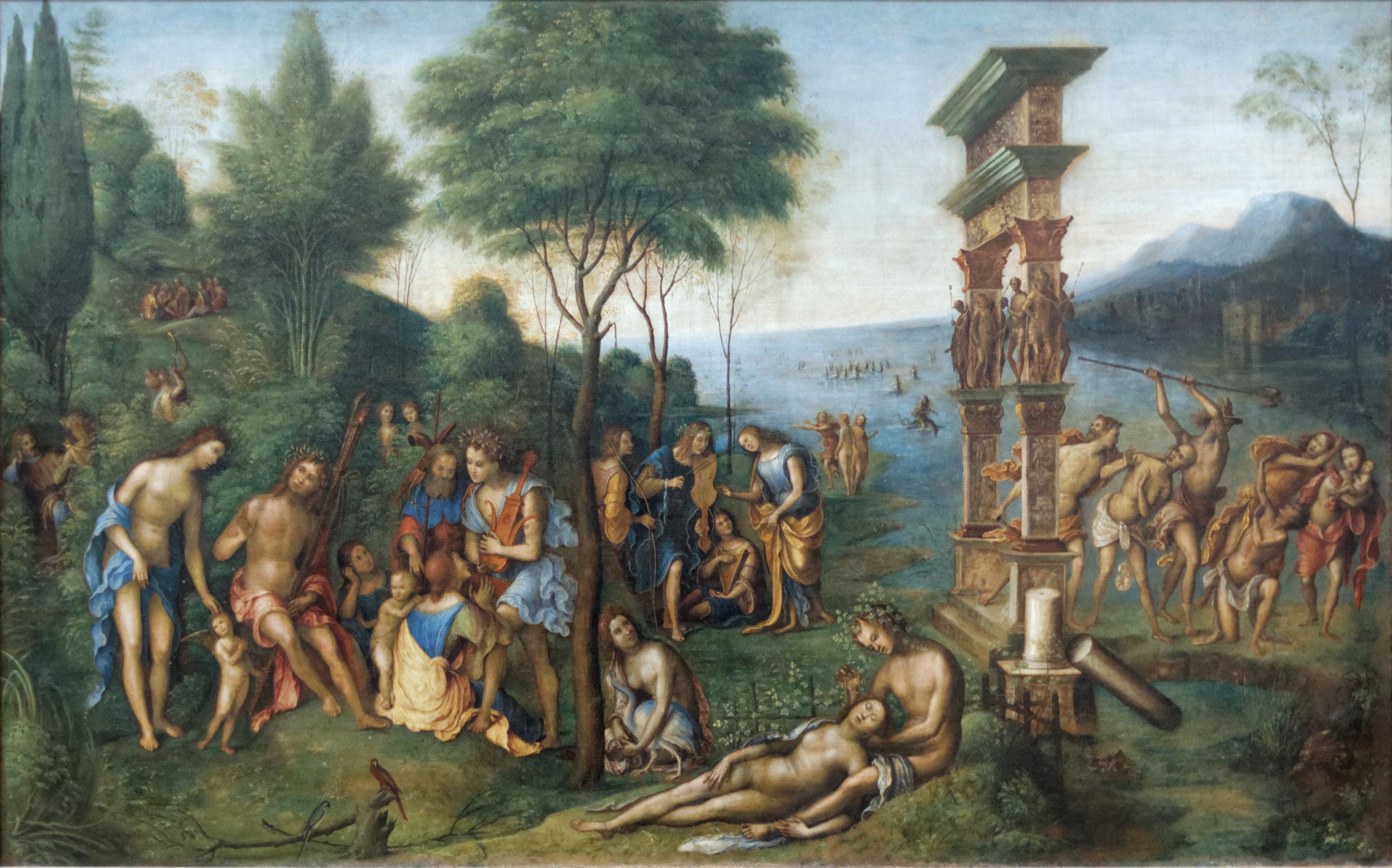
The Reign of Comus by Lorenzo Costa

In Greek mythology, Comus (/ˈkoʊməs/; Ancient Greek: Κῶμος, romanized: Kômos) is the god of festivity, revels and nocturnal dalliances. Cup-bearer of the god Dionysus, he was represented as a winged youth or a child-like satyr. His mythology occurs only in later antiquity. During his festivals in Ancient Greece, men and women exchanged clothes. He was depicted as a young man on the point of unconsciousness from drink, with a wreath of flowers on his head.

== Comus in art and literature ==
A description of Comus as he appeared in painting is found in Imagines (Greek Εἰκόνες, translit. Eikones) by Philostratus the Elder, a Greek writer and sophist of the 3rd century AD.

Dionysos sails to the revels of [the island of] Andros and, his ship now moored in the harbour, he leads a mixed throng of Satyroi (Satyrs) and Bakkhantes (Bacchantes) and all the Seilenoi (Silens). He leads Gelos (Laughter) and Komos (Comus, Revelry), two spirits most gay and most fond of the drinking-bout, that with the greatest delight he may reap the river's harvest.

In Renaissance times, an allegorical painting of the Reign of Comus was begun by Mantegna for the Studiolo of Isabella d'Este and was completed by Lorenzo Costa in 1511/12. This pictured Comus as the ruler of a land of bacchanals, seated on the left in the company of Venus and Cupid, beside an inlet of the sea. John Milton's later masque of Comus (1634) invents a new genealogy for the god, describing him as the son of Bacchus and Circe. A licentious figure here, as suggested in Costa's allegory too, his attempts to seduce a virtuous lady whom he has kidnapped are only narrowly defeated by her brothers.

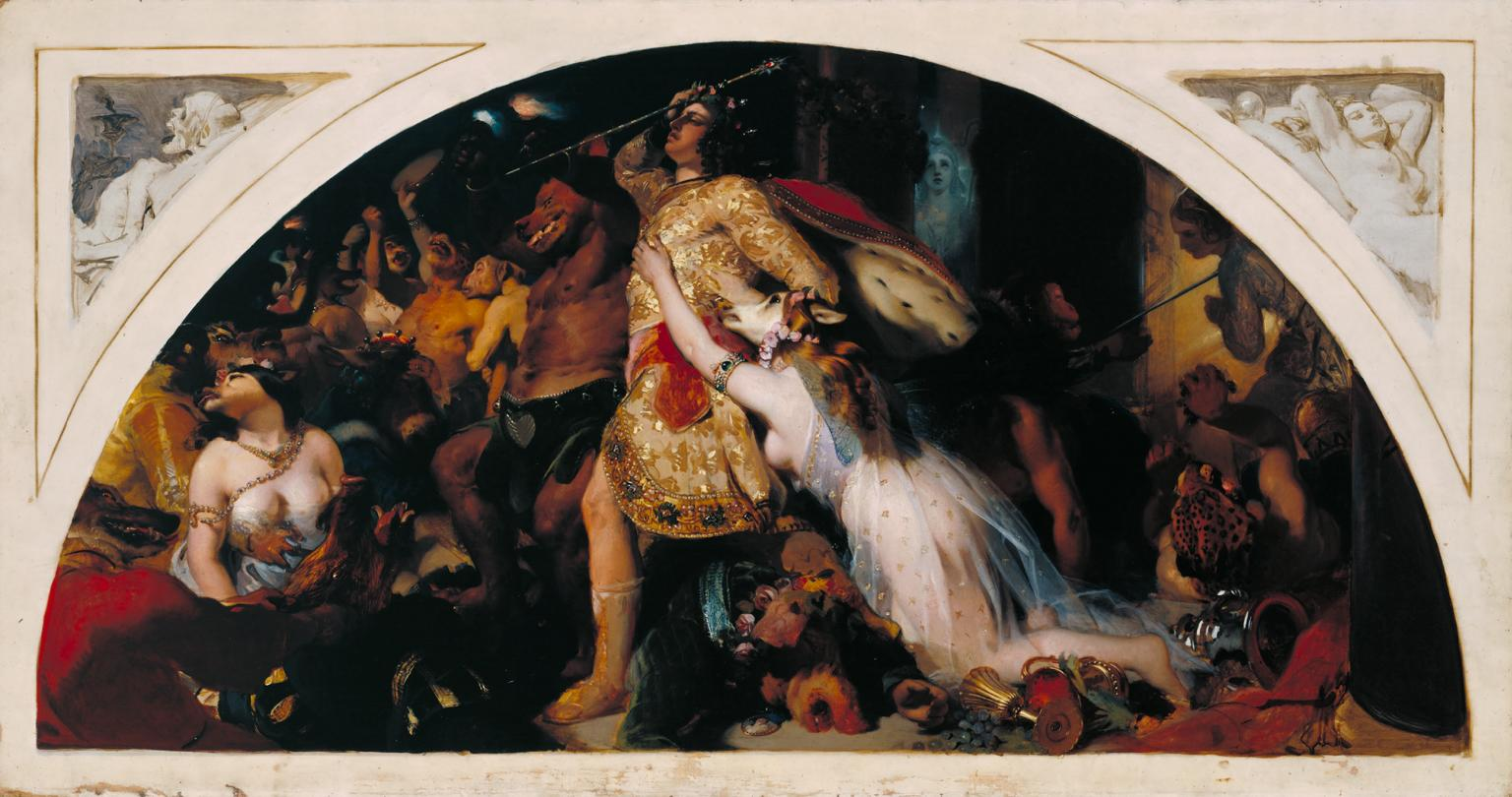
The Defeat of Comus, Sir Edwin Henry Landseer, once a mural in a small garden pavilion in Buckingham Palace

There have been a number of paintings of episodes from the play, including a set of eight watercolours commissioned from William Blake in 1801; Samuel Palmer's The Dell of Comus (1855, now in the Brighton Museum); and Edwin Landseer's The Defeat of Comus, originally painted in 1843 for the garden pavilion in the grounds of Buckingham Palace.

As a dramatic character, Comus also appears at the start of Ben Jonson's masque Pleasure Reconciled to Virtue (1618) and in Les fêtes de Paphos (The Festivals of Paphos, 1758), an opéra-ballet by Jean-Joseph Cassanéa de Mondonville. In addition, he features in the baroque operas Les plaisirs de Versailles (1682) by Marc-Antoine Charpentier and King Arthur (1691) by Henry Purcell and John Dryden.

During the 18th century a Temple of Comus was built as a venue in the Vauxhall Pleasure Gardens, where it was depicted by Canaletto during his visit to London and later made the subject of a popular print.
