= Reign of Comus (Lorenzo Costa) =

Painting by Lorenzo Costa

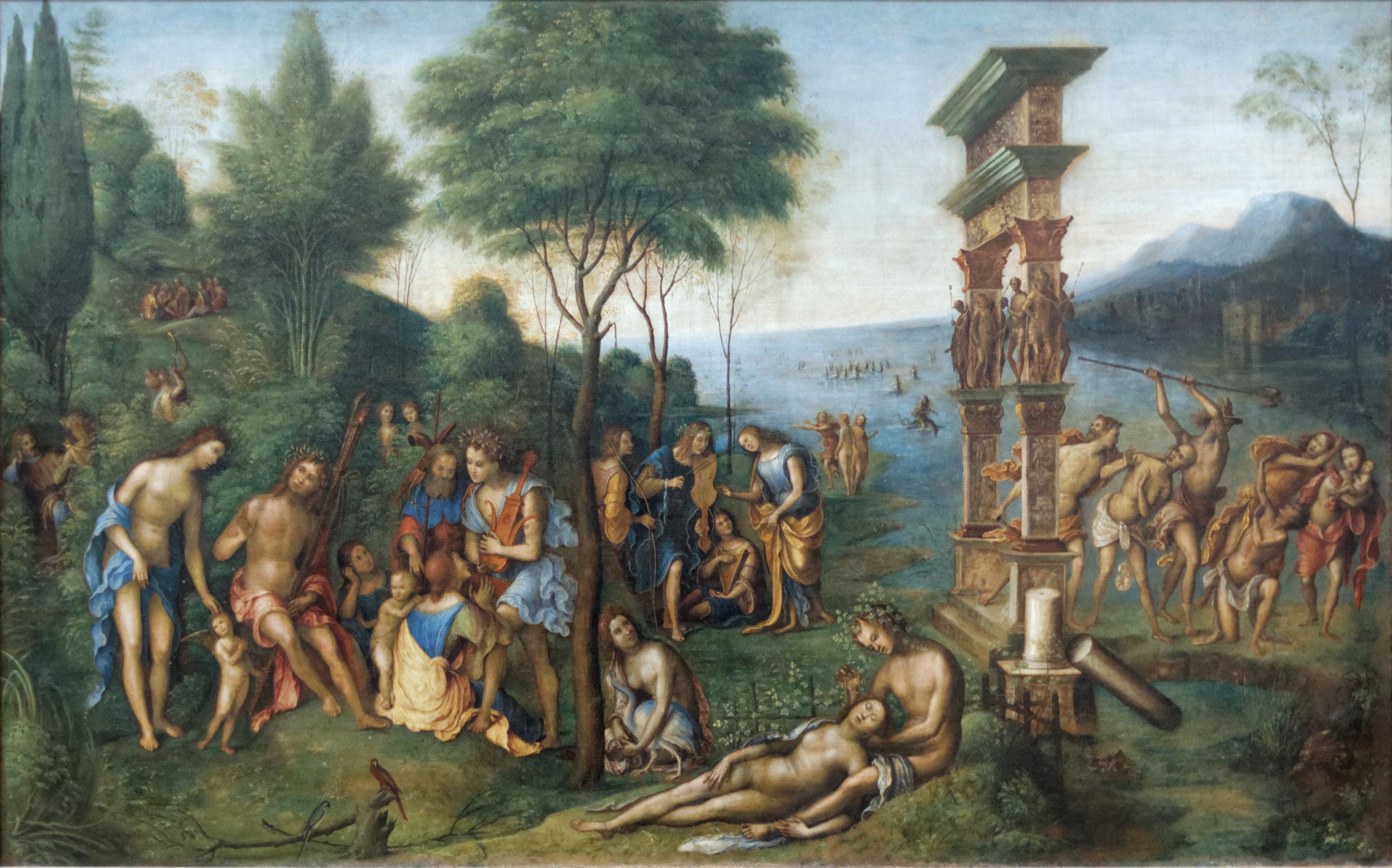
The Reign of Comus by Lorenzo Costa.

The Reign of Comus is a Renaissance painting by Lorenzo Costa for the studiolo (lit. 'little studio') of Isabella d'Este in the Ducal Palace, Mantua. It is made from tempera on canvas, and measures 152 cm × 238 cm (60 in × 94 in). It is now kept in the Louvre in Paris.

The first paintings for the studiolo were completed by Andrea Mantegna. Although he appears to have started Reign of Comus, it was completed after his death by Costa between 1506 and 1511, after he had been named court painter.

The iconography of this painting is complex. To the left of the foreground tree, a sitting Comus, the ruler of a land of bacchanals, with his head tilted looks at Venus. To his right, Apollo seems to serenade another sitting woman. In the center, Dionysus strokes the hair of a drunken maiden, identified as Nicaea. She had spurned his advances; and he overpowered her with wine in order to rape her. Meanwhile, to the right of an elaborate arch, Janus Bifrons and Hermes shoo away poorly clothed figures from the enjoyments of Comus.

The elaborate painting may have a moral justifying some of the virtues of reveling, or perhaps it is a melancholic work which exalts as virtuous, only Nicaea, the one character oblivious to the orgies around her.

== Other paintings of Isabella's Studiolo ==
- Allegory of Isabella d'Este's Coronation by Mantegna
- Parnassus by Mantegna
- Triumph of the Virtues by Mantegna
- Combat of Love and Chastity by Pietro Perugino
