= Daniel Nys =

Flemish art dealer

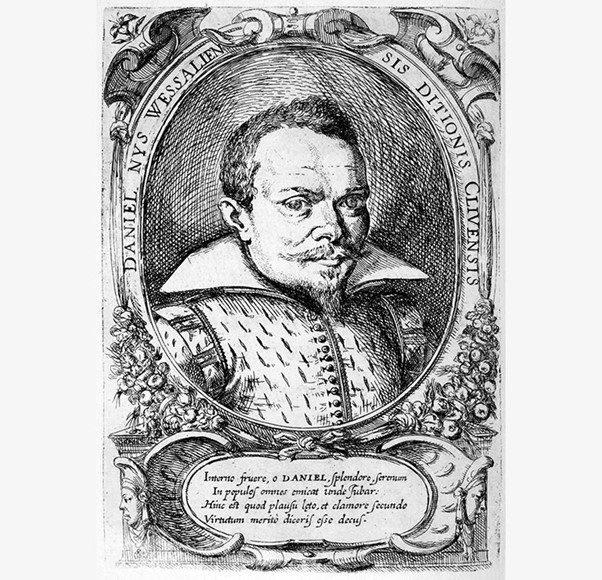
Portrait of Daniel Nijs by Odoardo Fialetti (from La pittura trionfante by Giulio Cesare Gigli (1615))

Daniel Nijs (or Nys) (1572-1647) was a Flemish art dealer.

== Life ==
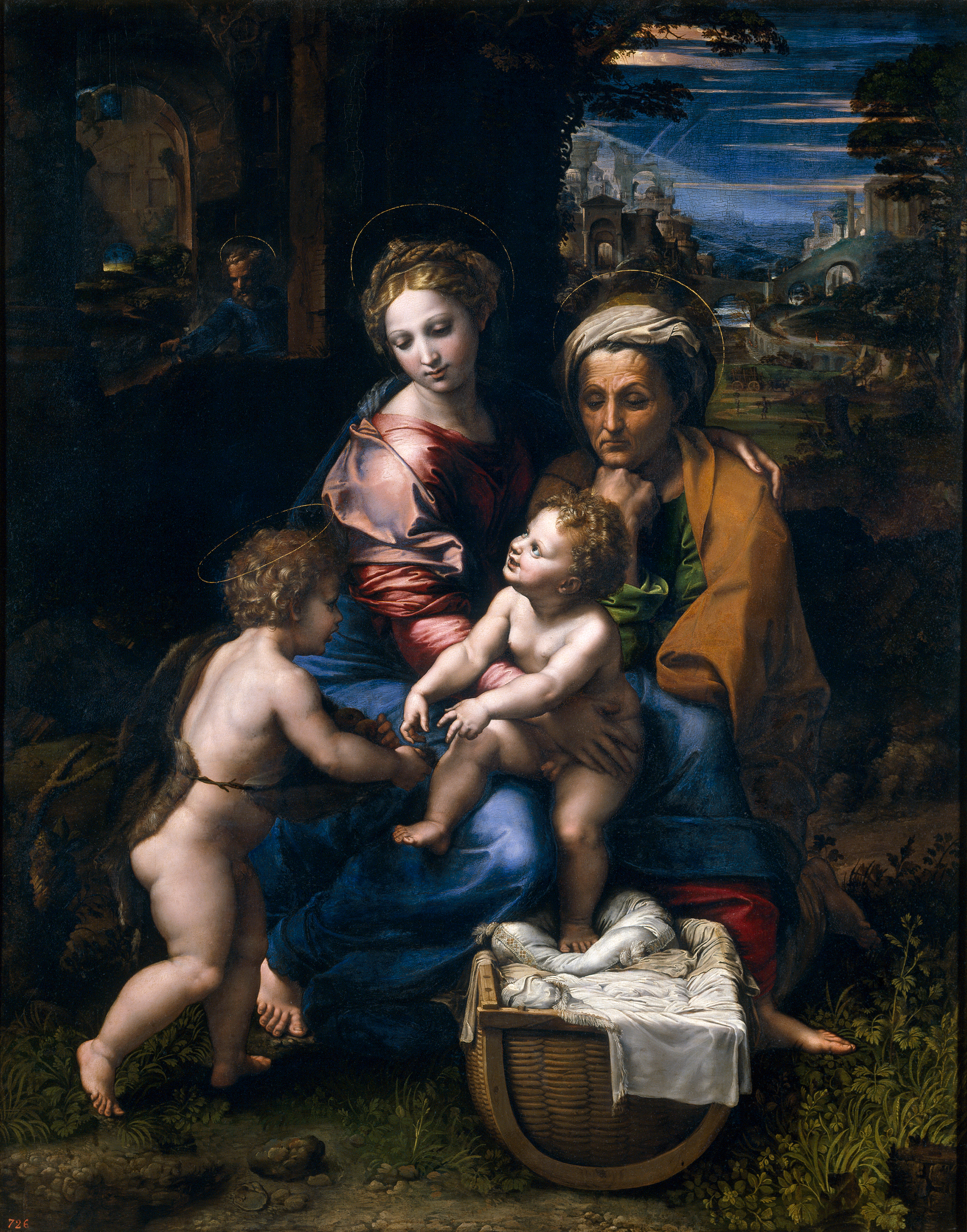
Giulio Romano, La Perla, 1518-1520, Museo del Prado, Madrid

Born in Wesel into a family of Protestant refugees from the Spanish Netherlands (now Belgium), he moved to Venice in 1596. There he worked for the firm of his cousins, the Gabrys, while also laying the foundation of his own firm. By 1615 he had made his fortune and possessed a major art collection which was described by Vincenzo Scamozzi, Giulio Cesare Gigli and Constantijn Huygens. In 1622 he came into contact with Ferdinando Gonzaga, Duke of Mantua to whom Nijs began supplying luxury goods. Five years later the 7th Duke, Vincenzo II Gonzaga, who was in dire financial straits, agreed to sell the cream of the paintings in the Gonzaga art collection to Nijs. Nijs, in turn, was interested in acquiring the paintings in order to sell them to Charles I of Great Britain. Its works included:

- La Perla, 1518-1520, by Giulio Romano, now in the Museo del Prado, Madrid
- Eleven Caesars, 1537-1539, by Titian, lost in a fire at the Alcázar near Madrid
- Madonna by Andrea del Sarto
- Saint Jerome by Giulio Romano

Vincenzo II's successor Charles I of Gonzaga-Nevers was persuaded to sell statues and further paintings to Nijs, leading to the bankruptcy of the dealer. Among the works included in the second part of the sale are the Triumphs of Caesar now at Hampton Court. Nijs died in London in 1647.

== Bibliography ==
- Anderson, Christina M. (2015). The Flemish Merchant of Venice: Daniel Nijs and the Sale of the Gonzaga Art Collection. Yale University Press.
- Braglia, Riccardo (2002). I Gonzaga. Il mito, la storia (in Italian). Artiglio.
