= Allegory of Virtue (Correggio) =

C.1531 painting by Antonio da Correggio

Allegory of Virtues
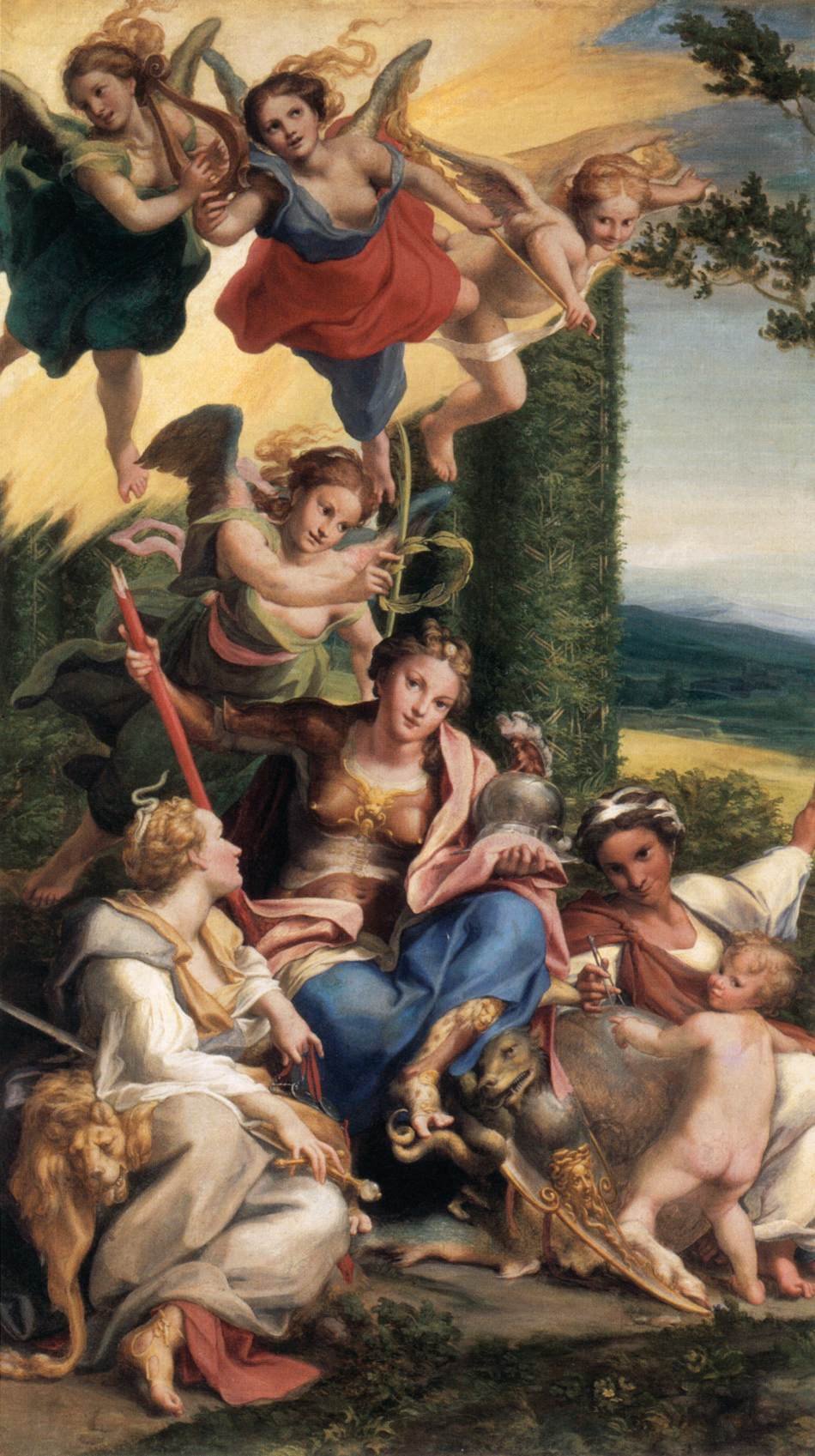
- Artist: Correggio
- Year: between 1525 and 1530
- Medium: Tempera on canvas
- Dimensions: 148 cm × 88 cm (58 in × 35 in)
- Location: Louvre, Paris

The Allegory of Virtue is a tempera on canvas painting by Correggio dating to around 1531 and measuring 149 centimetres (59 in) by 88 centimetres (35 in). It and Allegory of Vice were painted as a pair for the studiolo of Isabella d'Este, with Vice probably the second of the two to be completed. This hypothesis is since only one (possibly non-autograph) sketch survives for Vice, unlike Virtue, for which two preparatory studies survive (in the Louvre), along with a near-complete oil sketch (attributed to Correggio in the 1603 inventory of the Aldobrandini collection and now at the Galleria Doria Pamphili) - this suggests Correggio had become more proficient after the difficult gestation of Virtue.

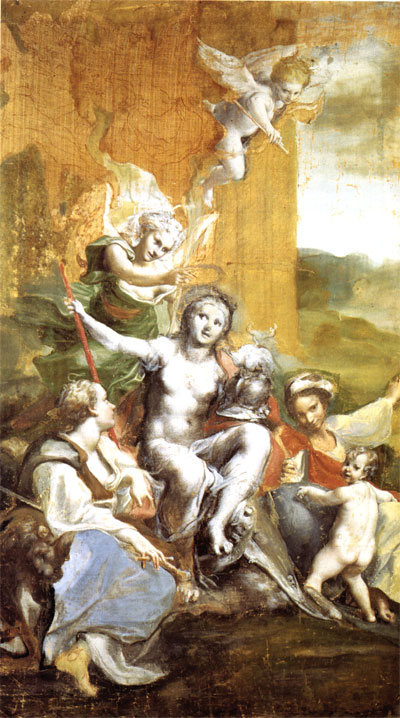
The Galleria Doria Pamphili sketch

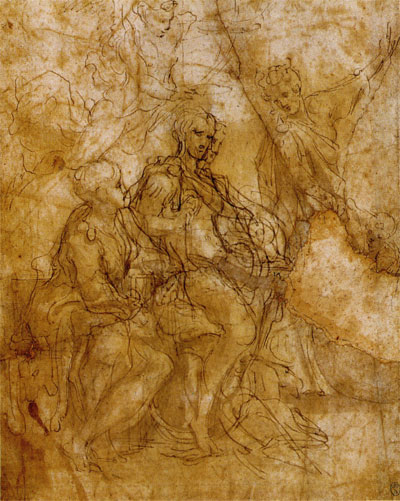
Sketch

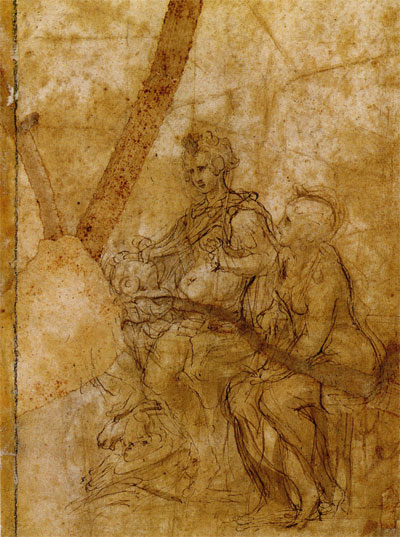
Sketch

As usually interpreted, the central woman is Minerva, holding a read lance and a plumed helmet - the work may even be a continuation of Mantegna's 1502 Triumph of the Virtues, painted for the same studiolo and also featuring a Minerva with a red lance. (Others have interpreted the figure as Isabella herself, dressed as Wisdom.) Glory hovers above her holding a crown, whilst a seated female figure to the left is surrounded by symbols of the four cardinal virtues (a snake in her hair for Prudence, a sword for Justice, reins for Temperance, and Hercules's lion skin for Fortitude). Some interpret the seated black female figure on the right as Astrology, Science or Intellectual Virtue - she points outside the painting's space and thus (like the putto in Vice) draws the viewer's attention from one painting to the other.

After the studiolo's contents was dispersed, Virtue and the Mantegna were given to Cardinal Richelieu around 1627 and moved to Paris. There they were acquired by Eberhard Jabach in 1671, before being sold by him to Louis XIV - Virtue still hangs in the Louvre.
