= Allegory of Isabella d'Este's Coronation =

Painting by Lorenzo Costa

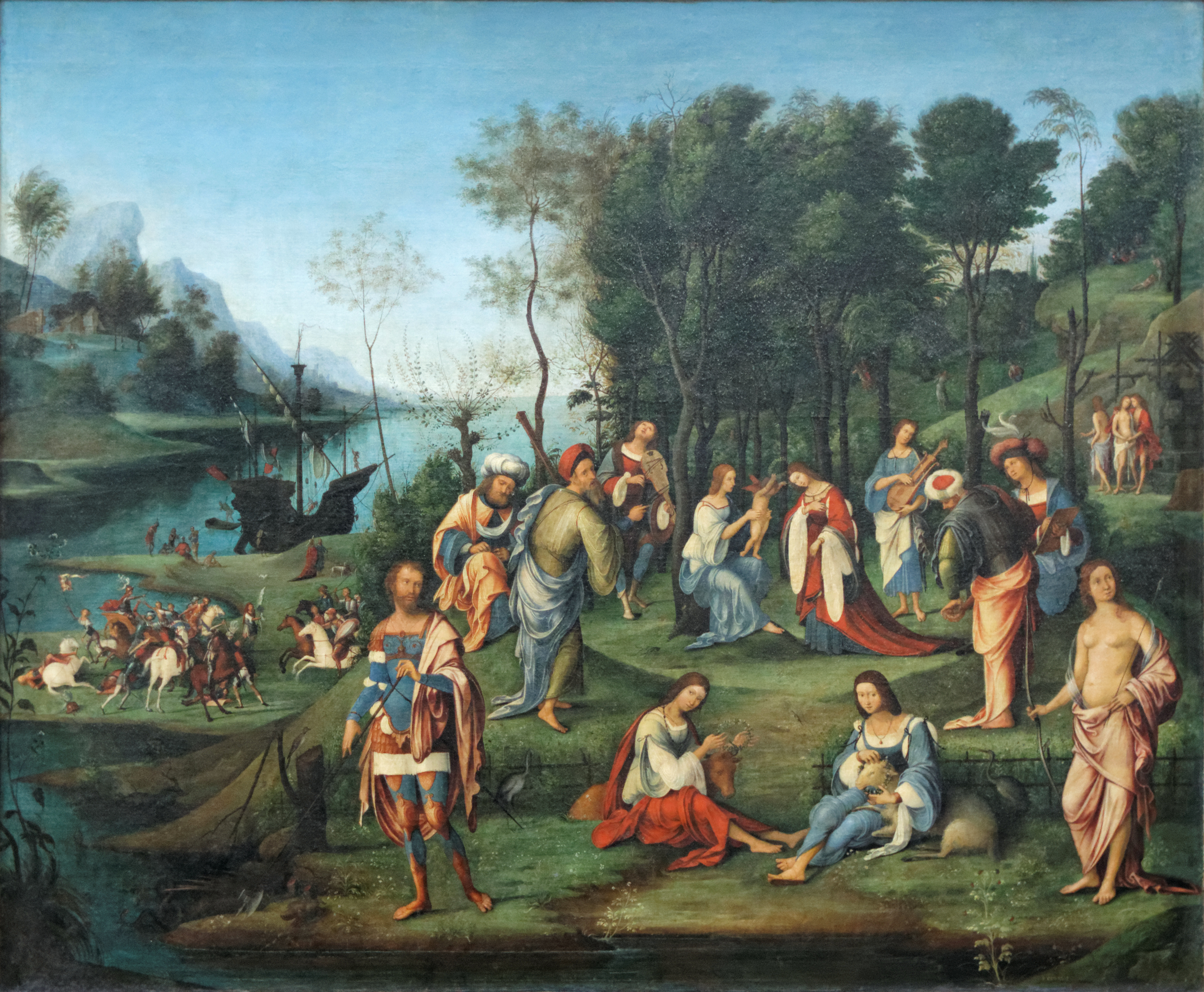
- Artist: Lorenzo Costa
- Year: 1505–1506
- Type: Oil and tempera on canvas
- Dimensions: 164.5 cm × 197.5 cm (64.8 in × 77.8 in)
- Location: Louvre; Paris

The Allegory of Isabella d'Este's Coronation is a painting by the Italian Renaissance painter Lorenzo Costa, dating to about 1505–1506. It is displayed in the Louvre, in Paris.

== History ==
The painting was the fourth commissioned by Isabella d'Este for her studiolo, after two canvasses by Andrea Mantegna (Parnassus and the Triumph of the Virtues, respectively from 1497 and 1499-1502) and Perugino's Combat of Love and Chastity (1503).

The subject was provided by the court poet Paride of Ceresara and was initially assigned to Mantegna. However, after the latter's death in 1506, he was replaced by Lorenzo Costa, who deleted all the work made by his predecessor. Isabella liked the painting, and this granted Costa the position as the new court painter of the Gonzaga of Mantua.

Duke Charles I of Nevers gifted this and the other paintings in the studiolo to Cardinal Richelieu, and the Allegory thus went to Paris. After belonging to several collections, it became part of the collections of the Louvre Museum.

== Description ==
The most accepted interpretation of the painting is an exaltation of Isabella d'Este, her rule and her role as patron of the arts, which generates harmony. She would be the figure in the center, crowned with laurel by Anteros, who is held by his mother, Venus: the two mythological figures would symbolize the heavenly and virtuous love, compared to the earthly and carnal one.

The scene would be in the garden of Harmony, where it is possible to freely practice Music, Arts and Poetry, which are referred to by the characters surrounding the coronation. In the foreground, behind the garden's boundaries, are Diana, symbol of chastity, and Cadmus (on the left), protectors of the arts such as Mercury, identified by the scene of battle behind him on the painting's left. The two female characters sitting on the ground are identifiable with the Virtues who watch over Isabella's world: the one crowning the ox would be Perseverance, the one crowning the lamb would be Purity or Innocence.

Another interpretation is that based on the Tabula Cebetis: the painting would represent the different genres of poetry, the foremost of which is lyrics, portrayed by Venus in the center. The character being crowned would be Sappho, and the personifications around her would be outstanding early lyricists such as Callimachus, Propertius, Ovid and Tibullus.

== Other paintings of Isabella's Studiolo ==
- Parnassus by Mantegna
- Reign of Comus by Lorenzo Costa
- Triumph of the Virtues by Mantegna
- Combat of Love and Chastity by Pietro Perugino

== Sources ==
- Mauro Lucco, ed. (2006). Mantegna a Mantova 1460-1506. Milan: Skira.
