= Allegory of Vice (Correggio) =

1531 painting by Antonio da Correggio

Allegory of Vices
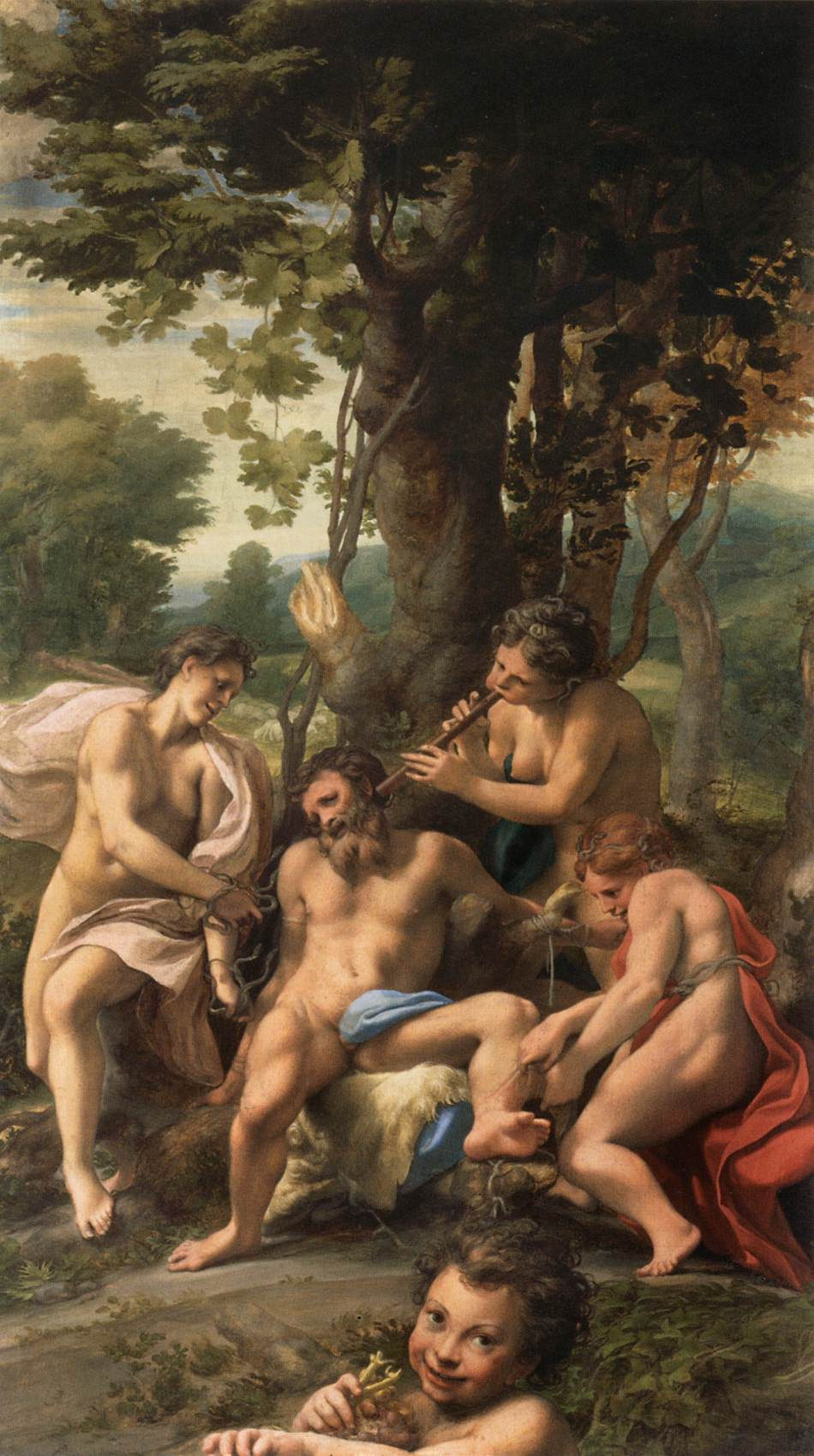
- Artist: Correggio
- Year: between 1525 and 1531
- Medium: Tempera on canvas
- Dimensions: 149 cm × 88 cm (59 in × 35 in)
- Location: Louvre, Paris

The Allegory of Vice is a tempera on canvas painting by Correggio dating to around 1531. It measures 149 cm (59 in) by 88 cm (35 in).

== Provenance ==
This picture and the Allegory of Virtue were painted as a pair to hang on either side of the door of the studiolo of Isabella d'Este. Correggio painted both works in tempera on canvas. He chose to use tempera rather than oil paint so that the painting would fit in with paintings by Mantegna, Perugino, and Costa which were already on the walls.

Vice was probably the second of the pair to be completed. This hypothesis is based on the context that only one (possibly non-autograph) sketch survives for Vice, whereas for Virtue, several preparatory studies survive, along with a near-complete under-drawing. This suggests Correggio had become more proficient after the difficult gestation of Virtue.

Influenced by the Laocoon (as is Correggio's treatment of Saint Roch in his San Sebastiano Madonna and Four Saints), the central male figure is sometimes identified as a personification of Vice, but is sometimes alternately identified as Silenus (possibly from Virgil's Eclogues 6, where a sleeping Silenus is tied up by the shepherds Chromi and Marsillo and forced to sing by them and the nymph Egle) or Vulcan. The figure was misidentified as Apollo and Marsyas by the writer of the Gonzaga collection inventory of 1542. This misunderstanding may have contributed to an Apollo and Marsyas (actually by the studio or circle of Bronzino) being historically misattributed to Correggio. The putto in the foreground is influenced by Raphael's putti in the Sistine Chapel.

In 1542, after Isabella's death, they were both recorded as hanging on either side of the entrance door "in the Corte Vecchia near the grotto", with Vice on the left and Virtue on the right. After the contents of her studiolo were dispersed, it remained in Mantua at least until 1627, but the following year it was sold to Charles I of Great Britain. After his execution it was purchased by Cardinal Mazarin in 1661 and later by the banker Everhard Jabach, who later sold it to Louis XIV in Paris, reuniting it with Virtue. They both now hang in the Louvre.

== See also ==
- Allegory
- List of works in the Louvre
