= Everhard Jabach =

French businessman and art collector

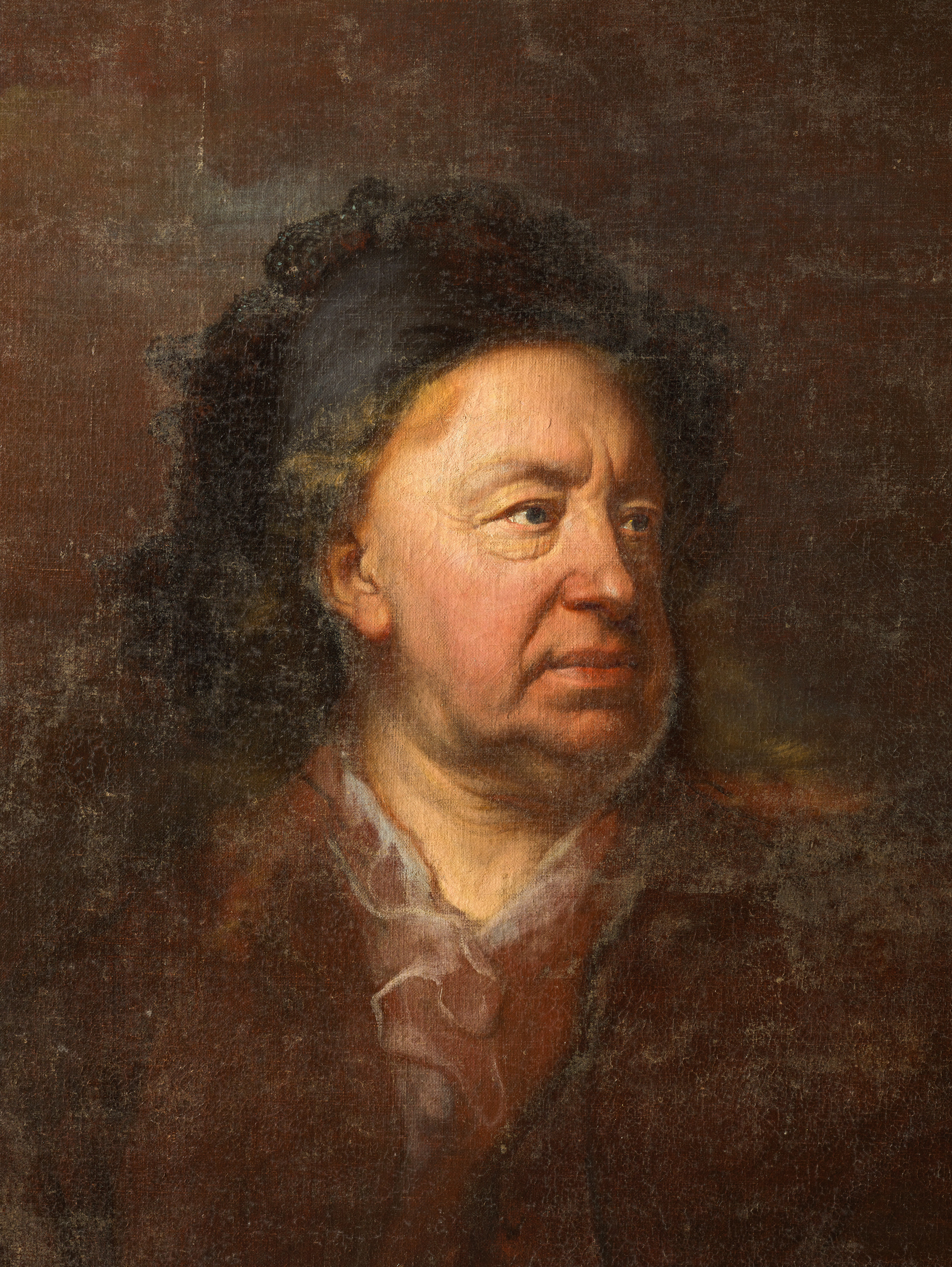
Jabach by Hyacinthe Rigaud

Everhard or Eberhard Jabach (10 July 1618 – 9 March 1695) was a French businessman, art collector, and director of the French East India Company. He was born in Cologne in the Holy Roman Empire but later naturalised as a French subject.

== Life ==
His father had expanded the family fortune and founded a bank in Antwerp, then in the Spanish Netherlands. Everhard himself settled in France in 1638 and was naturalised as a French subject in 1647. In 1648, he married Anna Maria de Groote in Cologne; she was the daughter of one of the city's senators, and he had four children with her. Francis Haskell called him "an opulent banker", associated with a trading company based in Amsterdam and one of the directors of the French East India Company, managing the 'factory' at Corbeil. In 1671, his fortune was valued at 2 million livres. Now lost, his town house, or 'hôtel particulier, was on rue Neuve-Saint-Merri; he put on plays there, whose audiences included Voltaire, before it became the base of the "Caisse Jabach" Comptoir commercial.

== Jabach collections ==
Jabach is most notable as a famous collector of drawings, paintings, sculptures, objets d'art, bronzes, and prints by Raphael, the Caracci brothers, Rubens, Paul Bril, Durer, Le Brun, and Poussin. They came from the Ludovisi collection in Italy, from the sales in the Netherlands of the collections of the Earl of Arundel after the death of his widow in 1654 and those in London of Charles I of England in 1650–1653, from other collections in Germany, and from the dispersal of Rubens' estate. Some of his drawings originated in Vasari's noted Libro de' Disegni portfolio. In 1661–62 and 1671, he ceded much of his collection to Louis XIV—a total of 5,000 drawings in the second sale, now in the Louvre's Cabinet des dessins.

In 1741, Pierre-Jean Mariette stated that "in selling the King his paintings and drawings, [Jabach] held back some of the drawings, and certainly not the least beautiful ones". At his death, he left behind another collection of 4,000 drawings in 26 portfolios; the Louvre's département des Arts graphiques conducted an inventory of them after his death and published it in 2002. In 2013, one aspect of Jabach's collection was the subject of an exhibition at the Louvre called "A German at the Court of Louis XIV; From Dürer to Van Dyck: the Everhard Jabach collection of Northern Art".

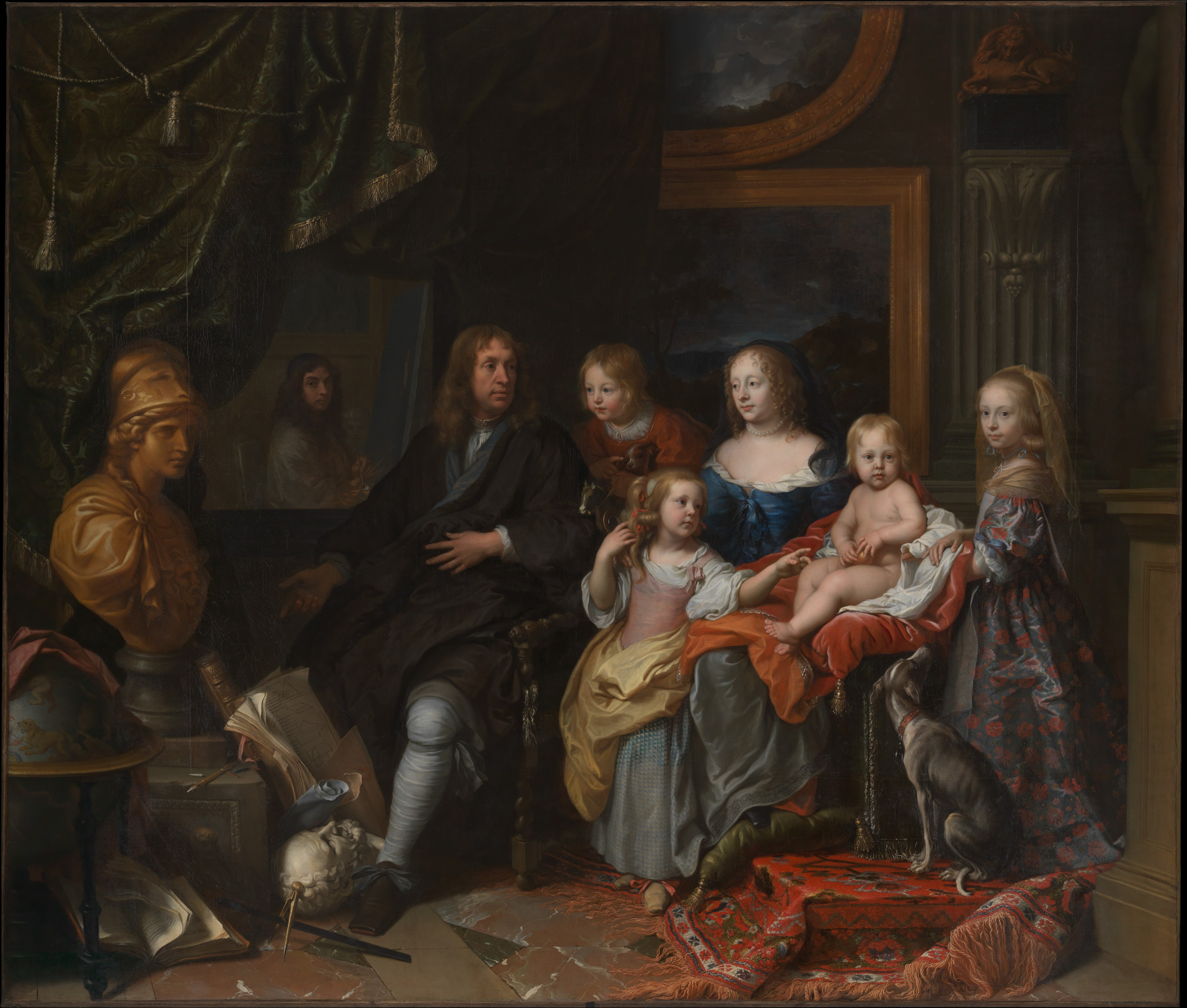
Jabach and his family, c. 1660, by Charles LeBrun

His portrait was painted by several notable artists of the time, including Rigaud in 1688 and Anthony van Dyck in 1636-37 (now in the Hermitage Museum), whilst he commissioned a group portrait of his family and his collection from Charles LeBrun (since 2014, Metropolitan Museum of Art, a second version having been lost in Berlin in WW2).

He also acted as an agent for Cardinal Mazarin in the dispersal in London of the collection of Charles I, in competition with the French ambassador acting for the king. Most of these paintings also reached the French royal collection after the cardinal's death. Jabach used agents in London, especially a French merchant called Oudancour. Jabach's purchases totaled over twenty paintings of extremely high quality, with the representatives of the King of Spain and the Emperor being the main other competing buyers.

=== Selected works from his collection ===
- Bronzino, Portrait of a Sculptor (now National Gallery, London)
- Pieter Bruegel the Elder, Adoration of the Magi in the Snow (now Oskar Reinhart Collection Am Römerholz)
- Caravaggio, The Death of the Virgin (now Louvre)
- Correggio, Allegory of Vice and Allegory of Virtue, from Isabella d'Este's studiolo in Mantua (both now Louvre)
- Durer, the Jabach Altarpiece (main panel lost; side panels in Wallraf-Richartz Museum and Städel Museum)
- van Eyck, Dresden Triptych (now Gemäldegalerie Alte Meister)
- Leonardo, St. John the Baptist (now Louvre)
- Gentileschi, Rest on the Flight into Egypt (now Louvre)
- Titian, The Entombment (now Louvre)
- Titian, Man with a Glove (now Louvre)
- Titian, Conjugal Allegory (now Louvre)
- Titian or Giorgione, Pastoral Concert (now Louvre)

== Bibliography ==
- Brotton, Jerry, The Sale of the Late King's Goods: Charles I and His Art Collection, 2007, Pan Macmillan, ISBN 9780330427098
- (in French) Antoine Schnapper, Curieux du Grand Siècle, Flammarion, 1994
- C. Monbeig-Goguel, « Taste and Trade: The Retouched Drawings in the Everhard Jabach Collection at the Louvre », The Burlington Magazine, 1988
- (in French) Collections de Louis XIV, Paris, Orangerie des Tuileries, 7 octobre 1977 – 9 janvier 1978, p. 10-20 du catalogue qui reproduit un portrait de Jabach dessiné par Le Brun, et son paraphe
- (in French) L'honneur de la curiosité – de Dürer à Poussin, dessins de la seconde collection Jabach, musée du Louvre, février – avril 2002, catalogue
- (in French) Philippe Dagen, « De Dürer à Poussin, de merveilleux dessins », Le Monde, 2 février 2002, article non signé; « Curieux et passionné », Le Monde, 22 février 2002
- http://www.metmuseum.org/collection/the-collection-online/search/626692
