= Paride da Ceresara =

Italian poet and astrologer

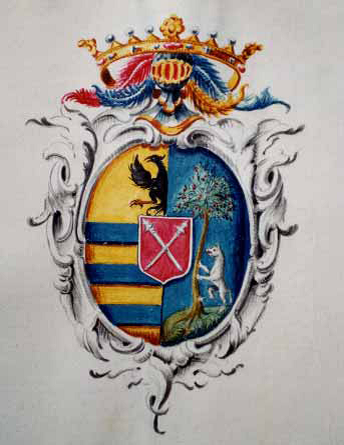
Coat of arms of the Ceresara family.

Paride da Ceresara (10 February 1466 – 1532) was an Italian humanist, poet, alchemist and astrologer.

== Life ==
He was born in Ceresara and was descended from the Ceresara, a noble family. He was in the service of Isabella d'Este in Mantua and came up with the mythological, allegorical and celebratory themes for at least two of the paintings in her noted studiolo and perhaps the whole cycle. Paride collected and translated classical works such as Plautus' Aulularia and also studied Hebrew. He also wrote a number of erotic sonnets, signed with his pseudonyms Patrizio Tricasso and Patrizio Tricasso da Ceresara.

He was hosted at the court of Aloisio Gonzaga in Castel Goffredo as an astrologer. He was summoned to Mantua in 1532 by Federico II Gonzaga to become podestà of the city, where Paride built the Palazzo del Diavolo on the corso Predella (now corso Vittorio Emanuele II) as his personal residence. He died in Mantua.

== Works ==
- Expositione del Tricasso Mantovano sopra il Cocle, Venezia, published by Vettor q. Piero Ravano, 1535
- Epitoma Chyromantico di Patritio Tricasso da Ceresari mantovano, Venezia, published by Agostino de Bindoni, 1538
- Rime, edited by A. Comboni, Olschki, Firenze 2004

== Bibliography ==
- (in Italian) Francesca Romana De Angelis, Ceresara Paride, in «Dizionario biografico degli Italiani», XXIII, Roma, Istituto della Enciclopedia italiana 1979
- (in Italian) Andrea Comboni, Eros e Anteros nella poesia italiana del Rinascimento. Appunti per una ricerca, in «Italique», 3, 2001; disponibile online:
- (in Italian) Giulio Busi, L'enigma dell'ebraico nel Rinascimento, Editore Aragno, Torino 2007
- Saverio Campanini, A Neglected Source on Asher Lemmlein and Paride da Ceresara: Agostino Giustiniani, in "European Journal of Jewish Studies" 2 (2008), pp. 89–110.
- Kenneth Borris, "Sodomizing science: Cocles, Patricio Tricasso and the constitutional morphologies of Renaissance male same-sex lovers", in: Kenneth Borris & George Rousseau (curr.), The sciences of homosexuality in early modern Europe, Routledge, London 2007, pp. 137–164.
- (in Italian) http://www.treccani.it/enciclopedia/ceresara-paride-detto-tricasso_(Dizionario_Biografico)/
- "Una pagina su Paride di Ceresara" (in Italian).
