= Eleven Caesars =

Painting series by Titian

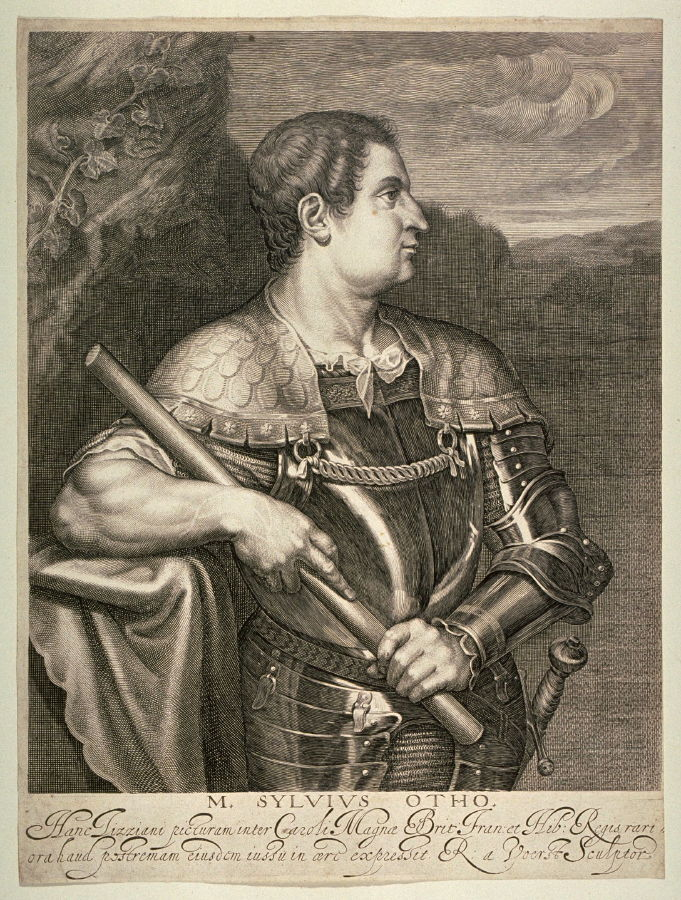
The Emperor Otho, by Robert Van Voerst after the lost painting by Titian

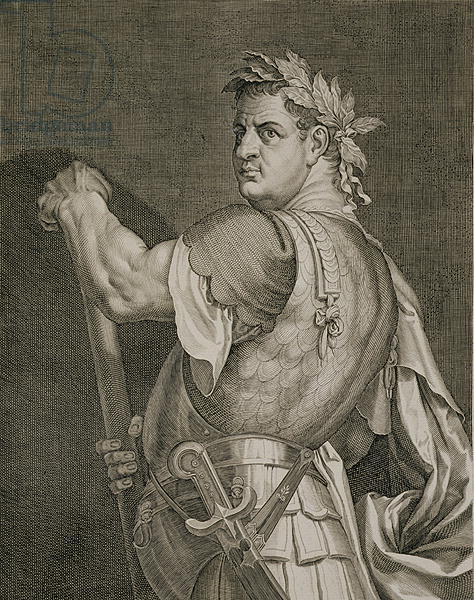
The Emperor Titus, by Aegidius Sadeler II

The Eleven Caesars was a series of eleven painted half-length portraits of Roman emperors made by Titian in 1536–1540 for Federico II, Duke of Mantua. They were among his best-known works, inspired by the Lives of the Caesars by Suetonius. Titian's paintings were originally housed in a new room inside the Palazzo Ducale di Mantova. Bernardino Campi added a twelfth portrait in 1562.

The portraits were copied by Flemish engravers in the late 16th and early 17th centuries, who added engravings of twelve Roman Empresses. Between 1627 and 1628 the paintings were sold to Charles I of England by Vincenzo II Gonzaga, and when the Royal Collection of Charles I was broken up and sold after his execution by the English Commonwealth, the Eleven Caesars passed in 1651 into the collection of Philip IV of Spain. They were all destroyed in a catastrophic fire at the Royal Alcázar of Madrid in 1734, and are now only known from copies and engravings.

== History ==
Titian was commissioned in 1536 to paint eleven portraits for the Gabinetto dei Cesari (sometimes Camerino dei Cesari, "Cabinet of the Caesars"), one room in new suite at the Palazzo Ducale di Mantova designed by Giulio Romano, with décor inspired by ancient history. The suite, the Appartamento di Troia ("Troy Apartments"), was named after the theme of the main room. Titian's portraits were inspired by Suetonius's account of the Lives of the Twelve Caesars and informed by Titian's study of ancient medals and busts. The dimensions of the room allowed three portraits on each wall, but a window on the west wall meant that only eleven painting were included in the decorative scheme. Titian's portraits were completed shortly before the death of Duke Federico in August 1540. Romano later added a portrait of the twelfth emperor, Domitian, displayed elsewhere.

The emperors were depicted in classical poses, wearing armour and flowing draped clothing, accompanied by various objects such as swords and staffs. The series ran clockwise around the top of the room, from Julius Caesar on the north wall to Titus on the west wall. Romano added frescos on the ceilings; stucco and niches to frame Titian's paintings; and a series of further paintings on wooden panels as a dado or basamento around the lower part of the walls, with a scene from the life of each emperor below the relevant portrait. Some of the works by Romano, or his workshop, designed to hang below Titian's portraits are in the British Royal Collection.

Titian's eleven portraits were copied by Bernardino Campi in 1561 for Francesco Ferdinando d'Ávalos, governor of Milan. To Titian's eleven portraits, Campi added the twelfth Caesar, Domitian, in 1562, after the portrait by Romano. Campi returned to the subject several times, painting at least another four sets for other patrons.

Drawings of most of Titian's originals (but omitting the west wall) were made by Ippolito Andreasi for Jacopo Strada in about 1568. The portraits were engraved by Aegidius Sadeler II and published in Antwerp in about 1593, and then republished by Marcus Sadeler in about 1625. Both were court artists to Emperor Rudolf II in Prague. The engravers added twelve accompanying empresses – eleven wives and Otho's mother, Albia Terentia – based on portraits by Giulio Romano. Each engraved portrait is accompanied by a poem in Latin. The engravings are an important source for the details of Renaissance armour, including examples attributed to Filippo Negroli.

The Gonzaga collection, including Titian's paintings, was sold by Vincenzo II Gonzaga to Charles I of England in 1628, but Charles's Royal Collection was broken up and auctioned under the English Commonwealth. The Titian portraits were sold for £1,200 in 1651 and bought by the Spanish Ambassador Alonso de Cárdenas, acting on behalf Don Luis Méndez de Haro, who gave them to Philip IV of Spain.

Titian's portraits were displayed at the Royal Alcázar of Madrid, along with other portraits by Titian and Tintoretto, where the Galería del Mediodía (the South gallery) became known as the Galería de Retratos (Portrait Gallery). They were lost in the catastrophic fire that destroyed the Alcázar in 1734.

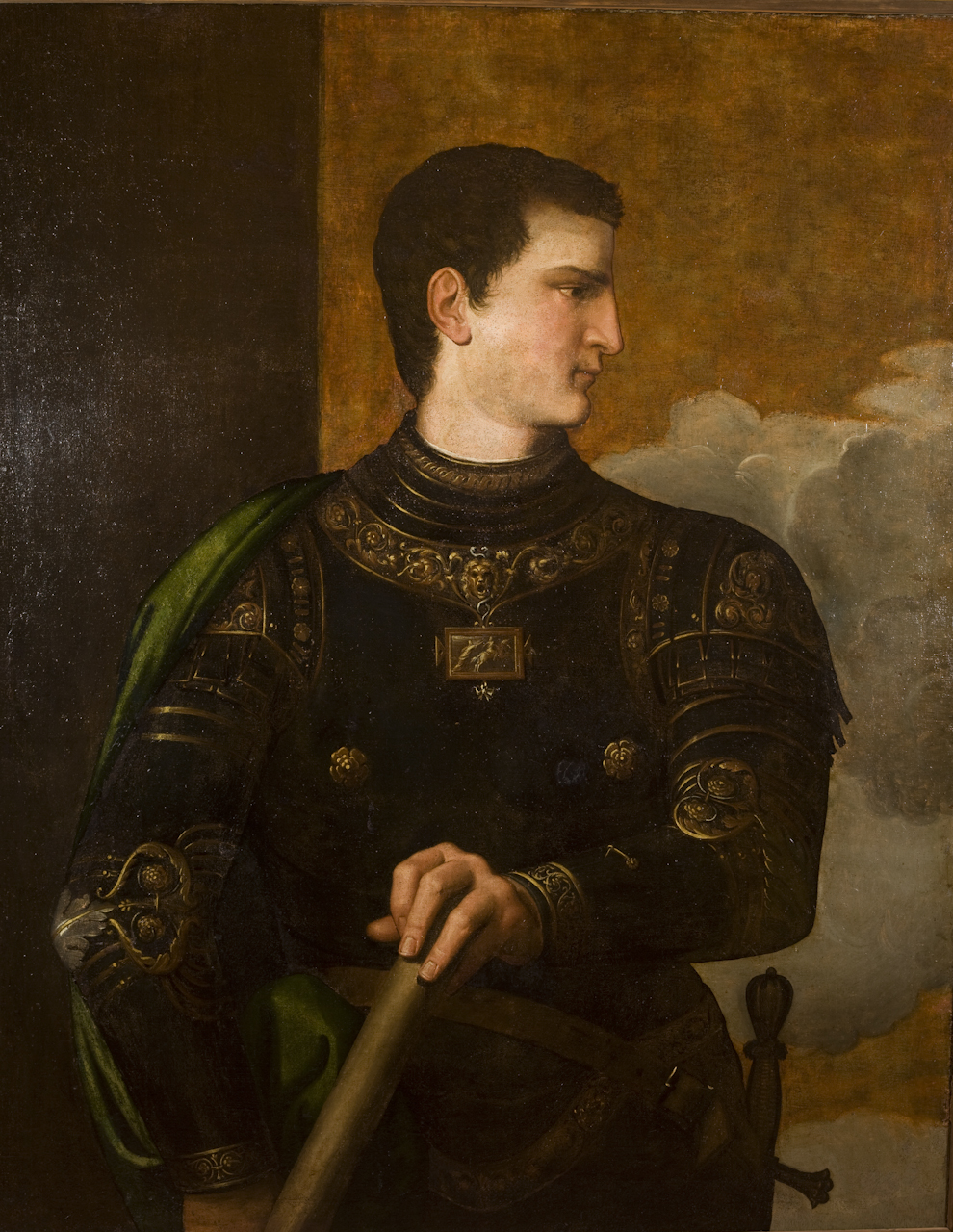
Emperor Caligula by Bernardino Campi, after the lost painting by Titian

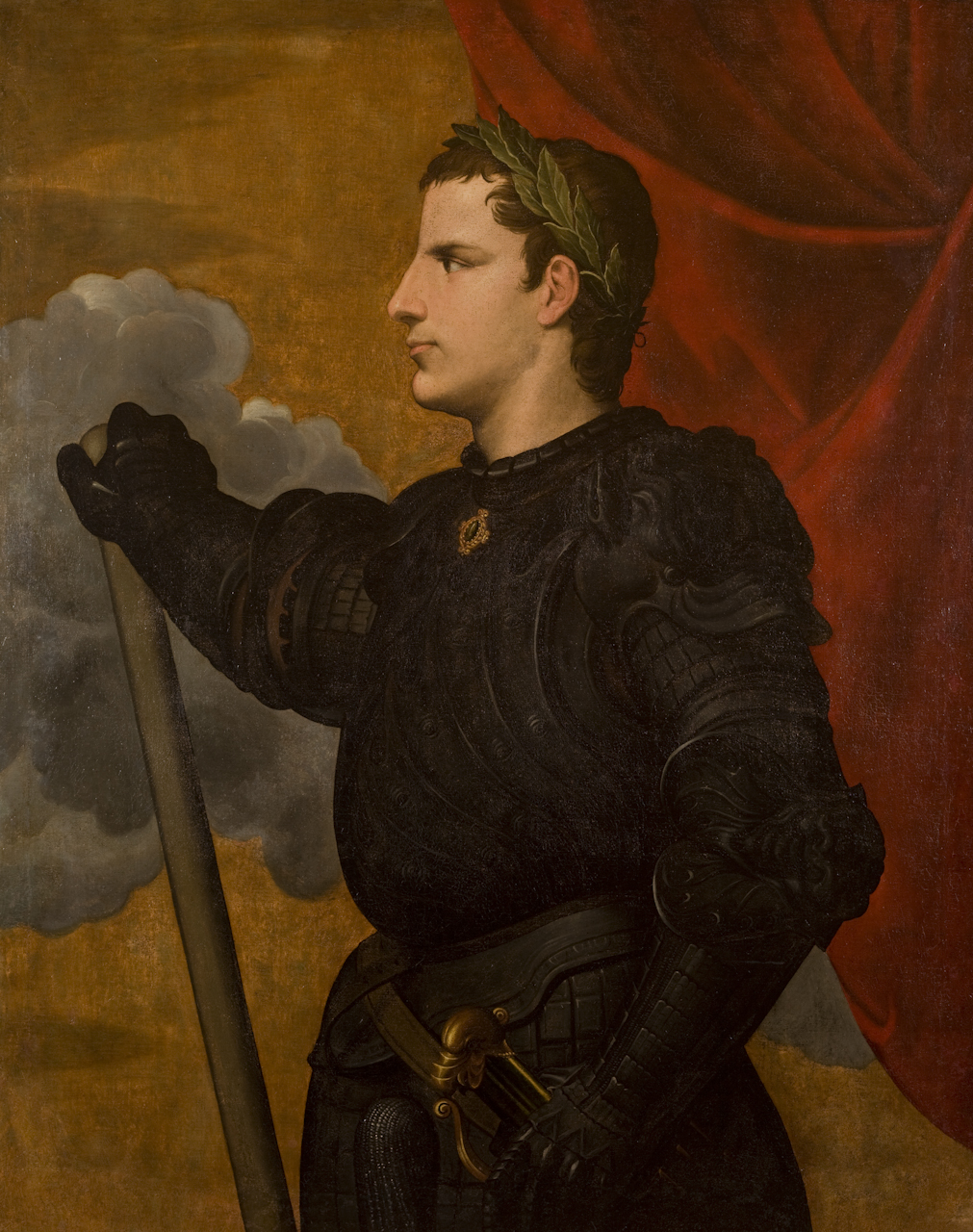
Emperor Claudius by Bernardino Campi, after the lost painting by Titian

== Gallery ==
Set of engravings with English commentary, after those of Aegidius Sadeler II (Antwerp c. 1593, and later editions), after the lost paintings by Titian.

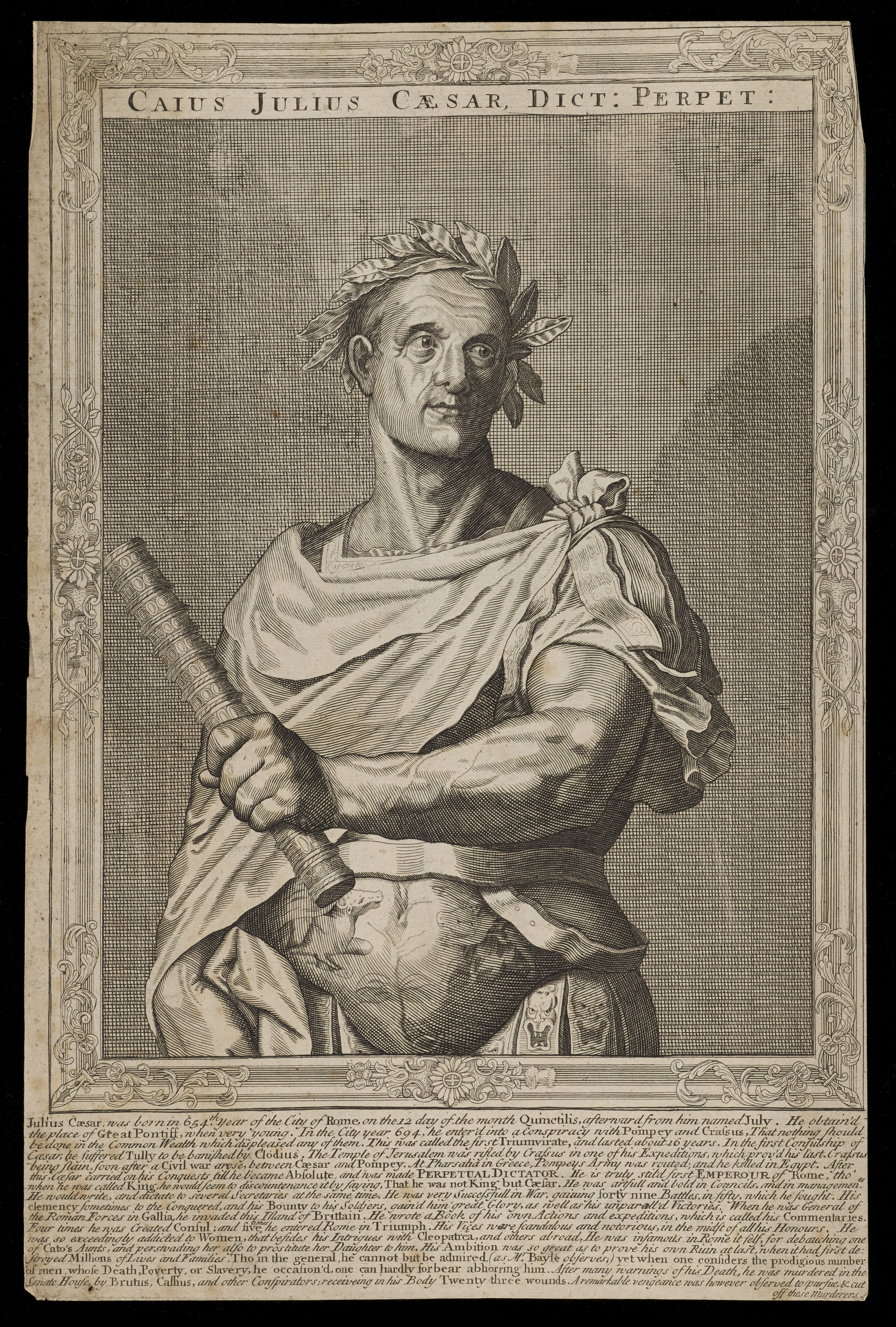
Julius Caesar

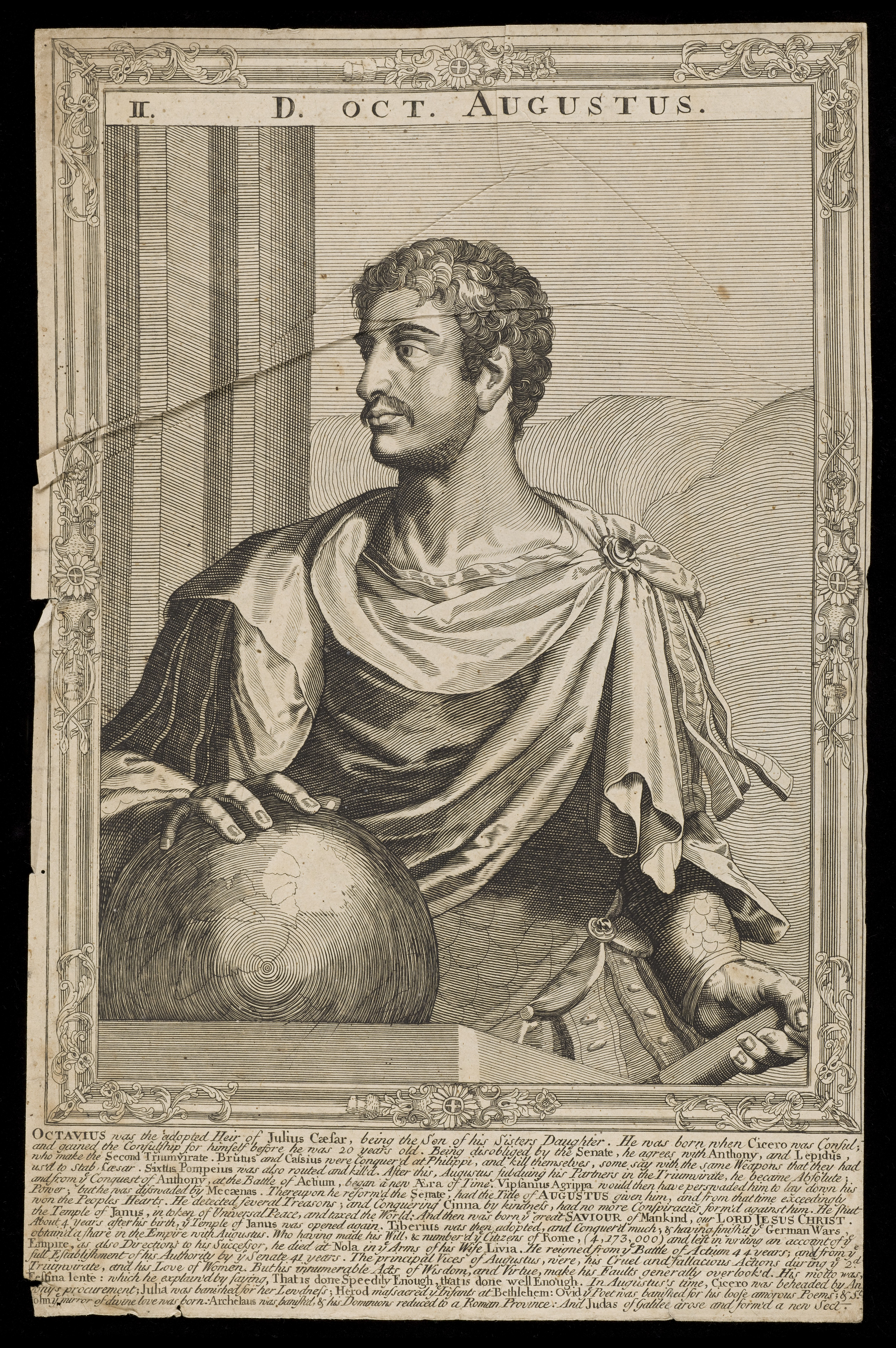
Augustus

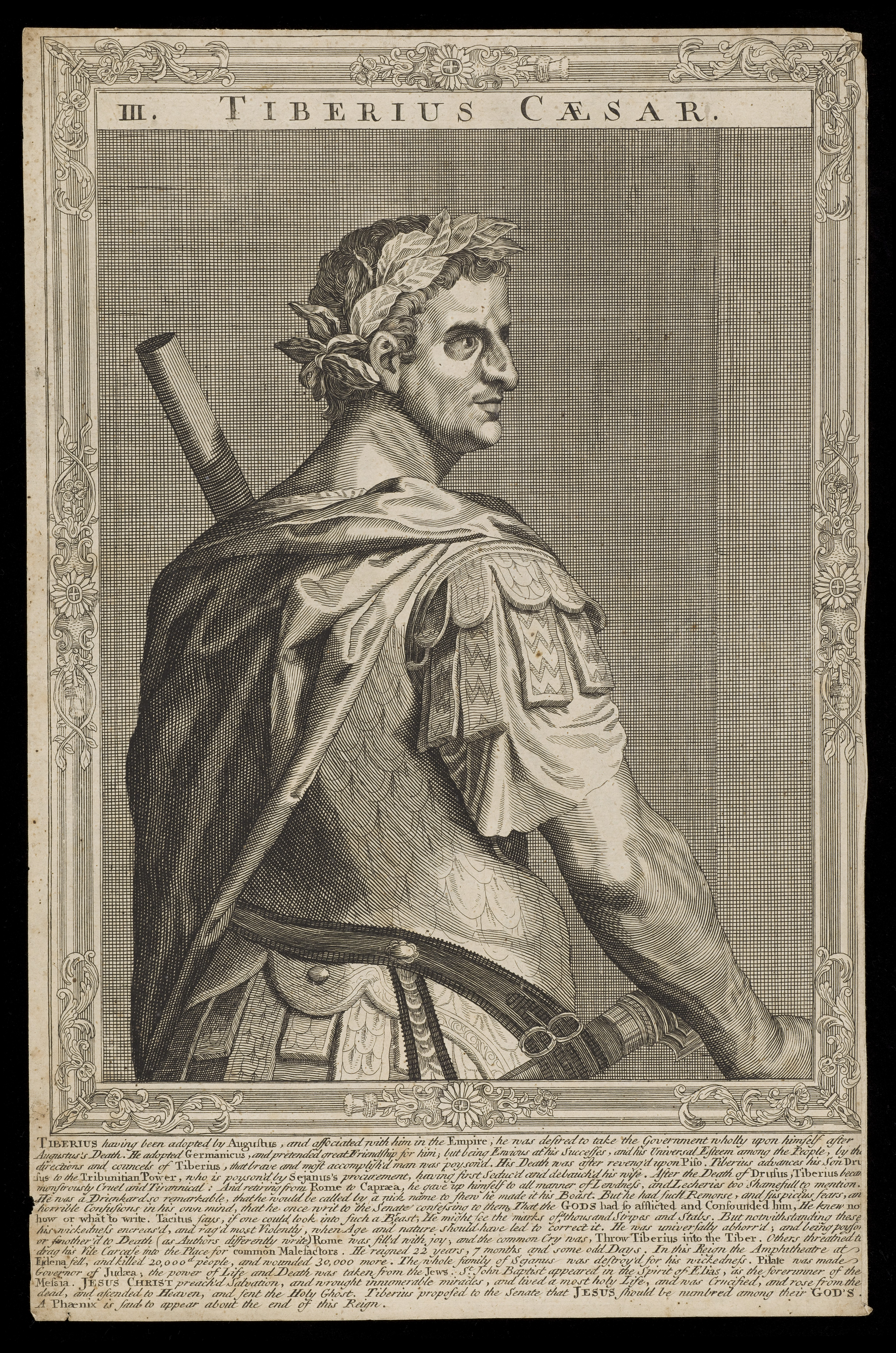
Tiberius

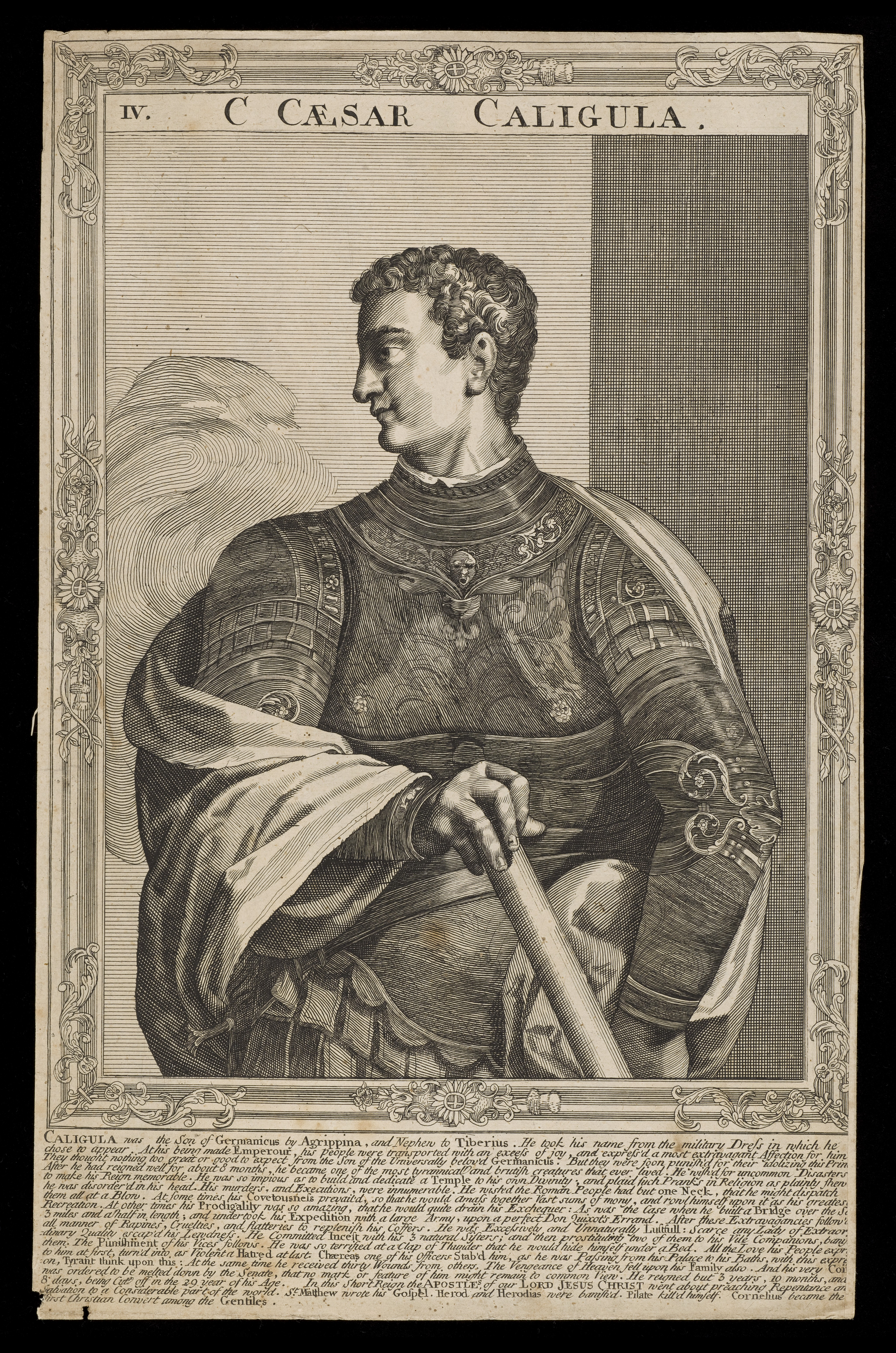
Caligula

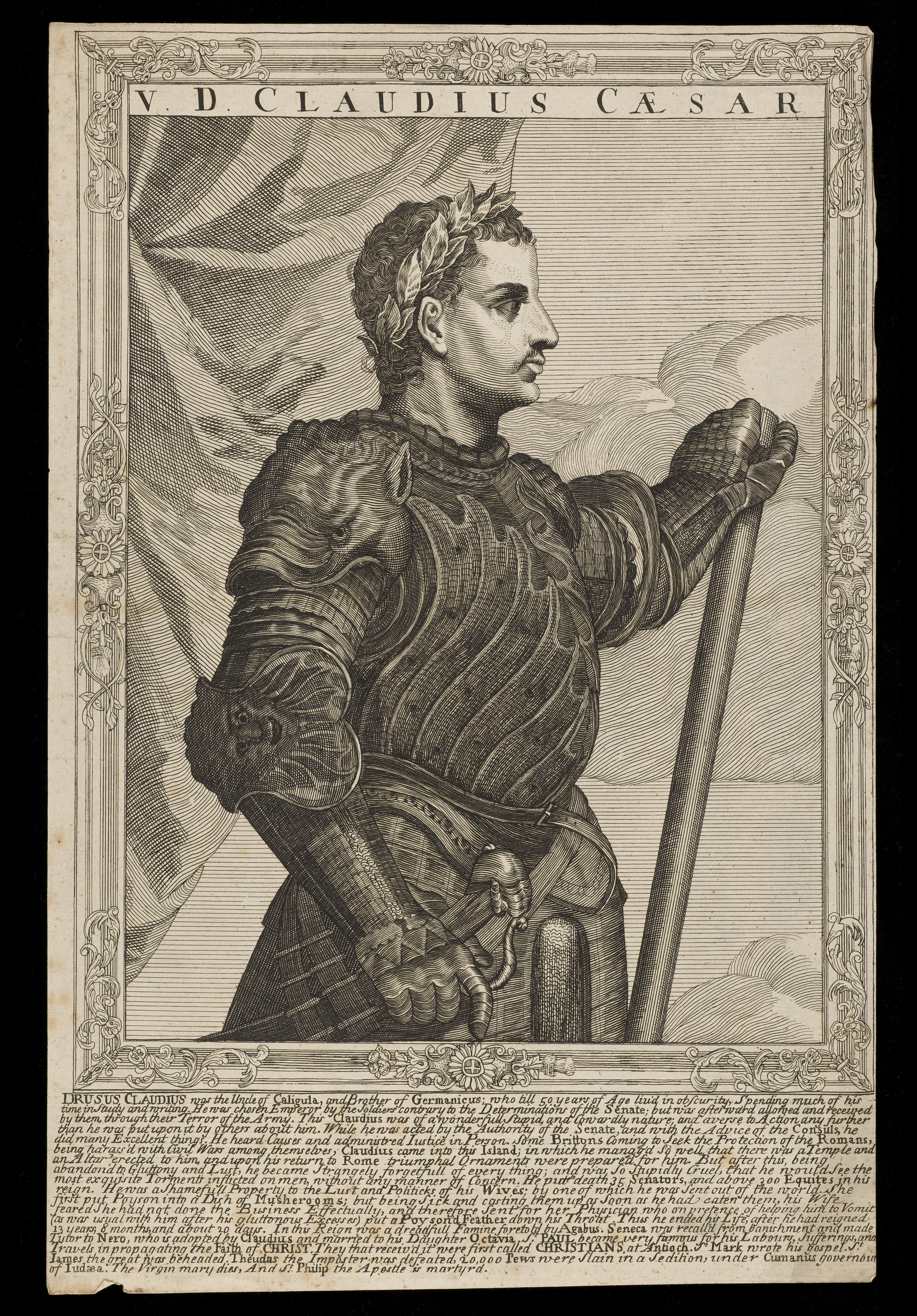
Claudius

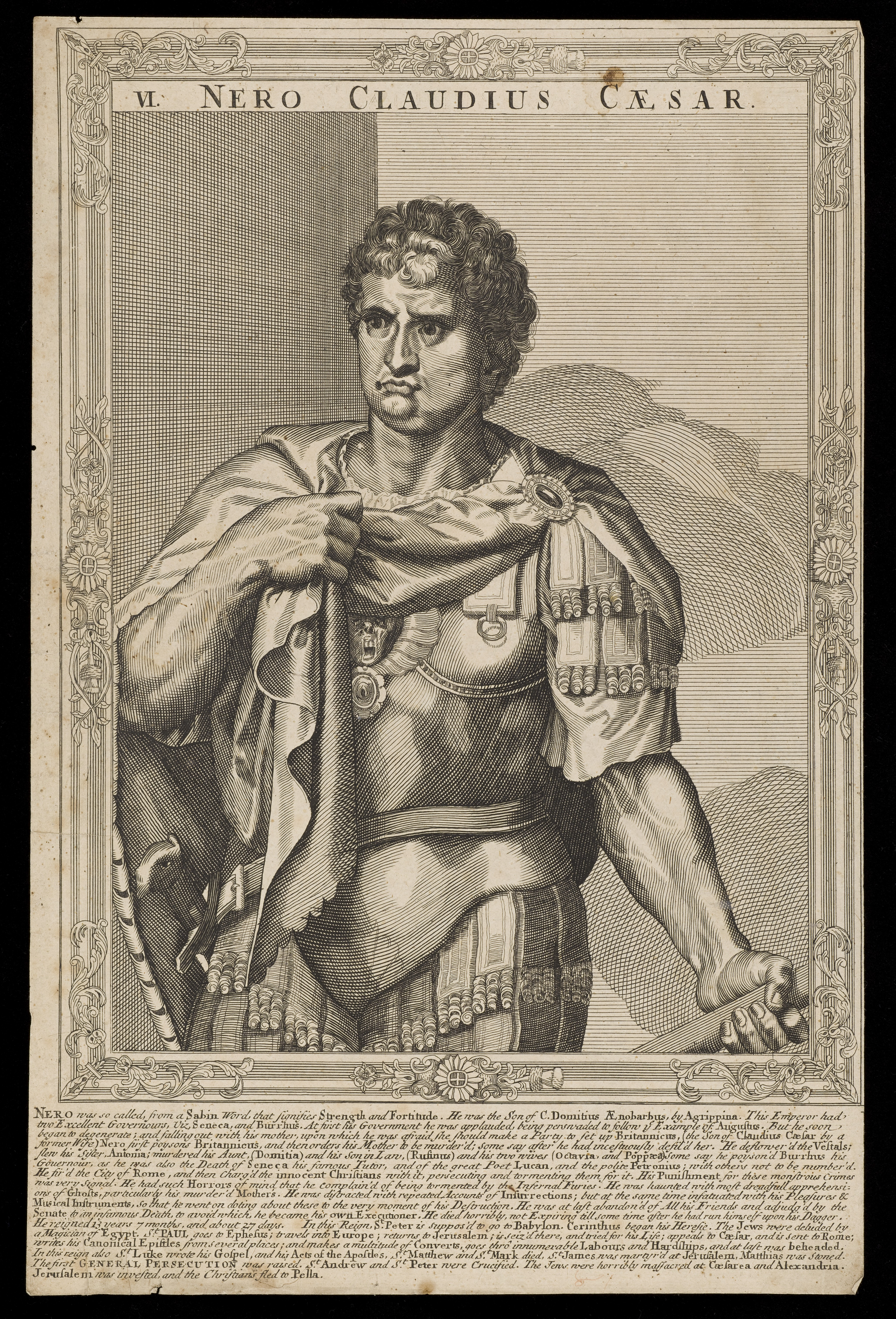
Nero

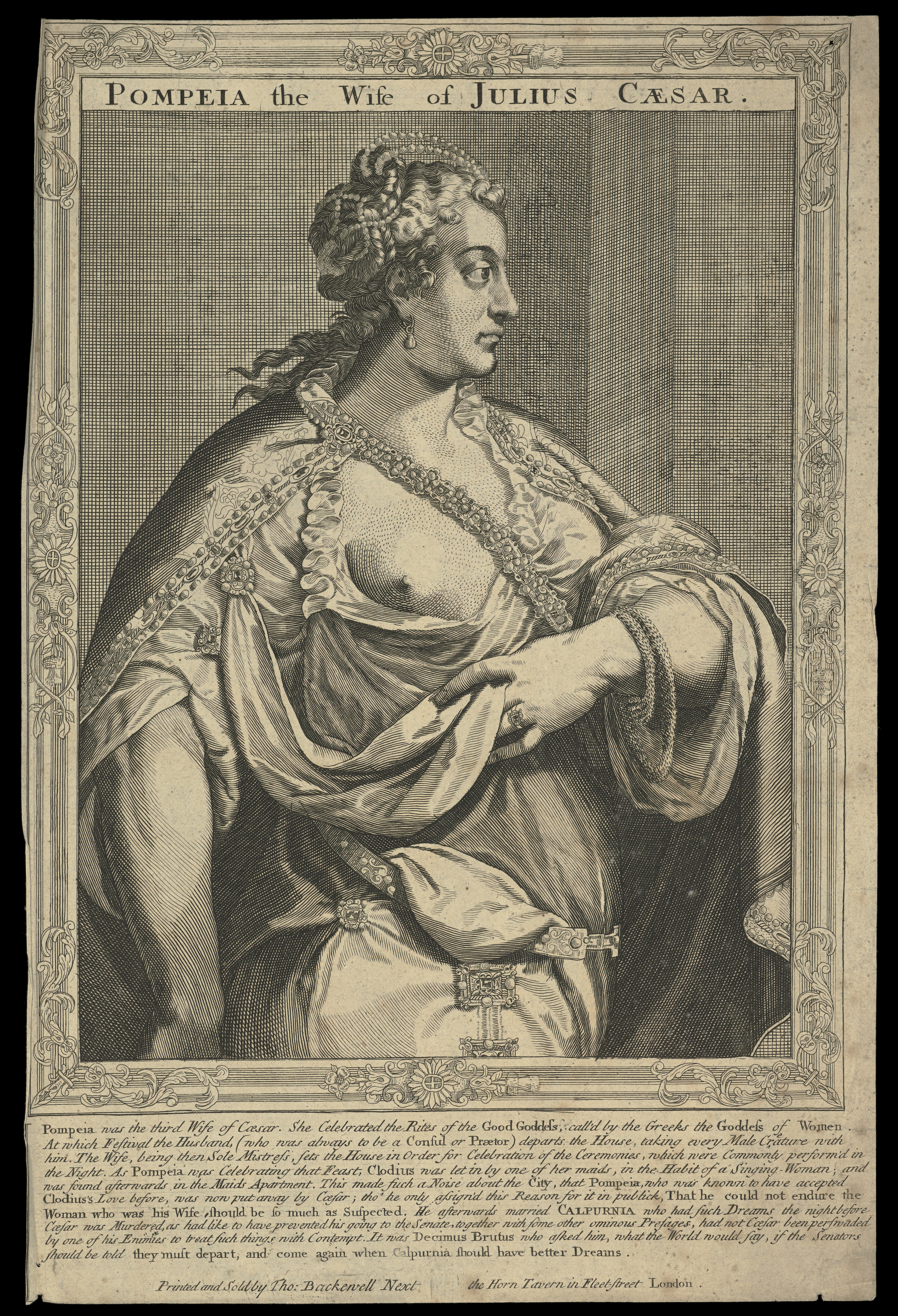
Pompeia, wife of Julius Caesar

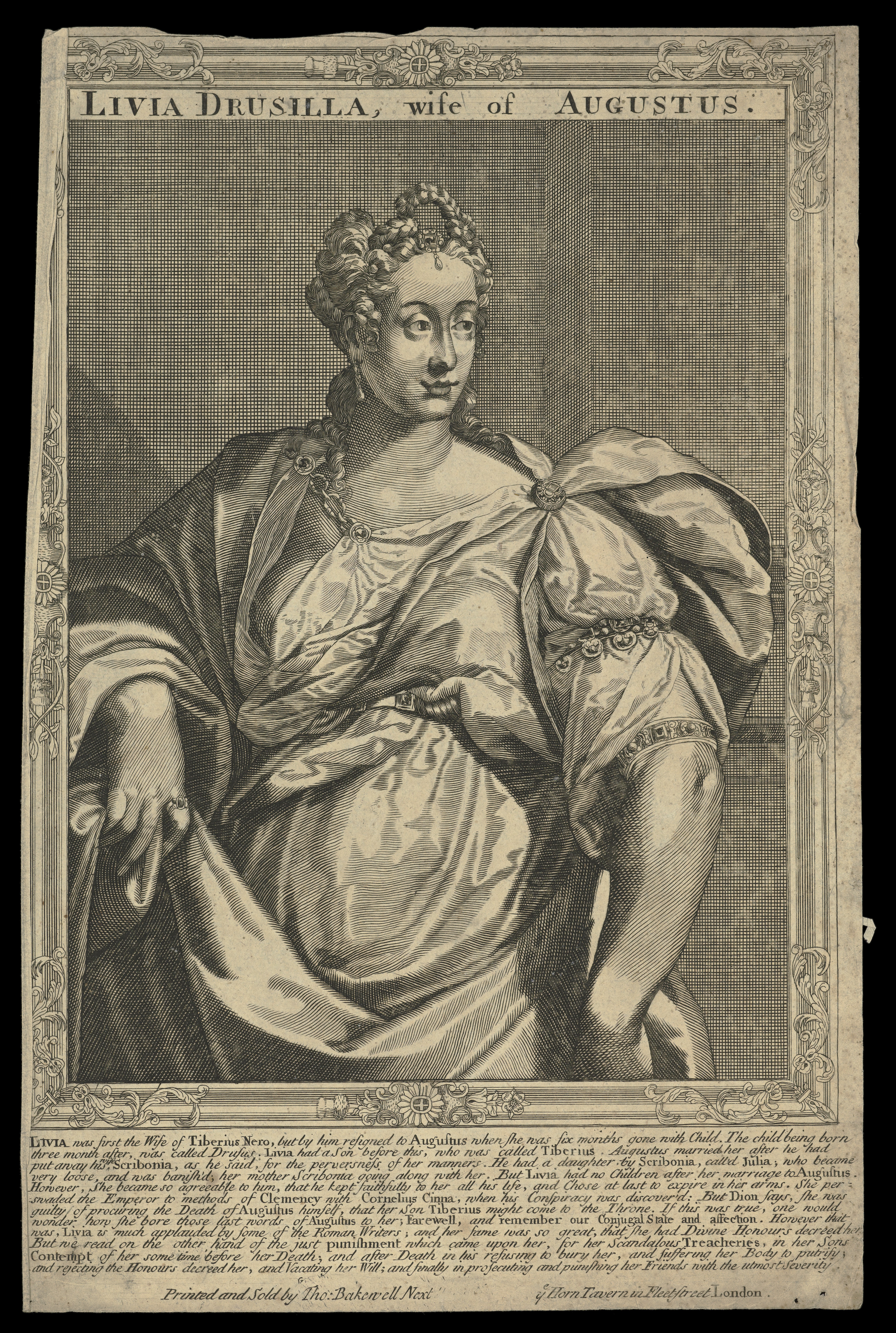
Livia Drusilla, wife of Augustus

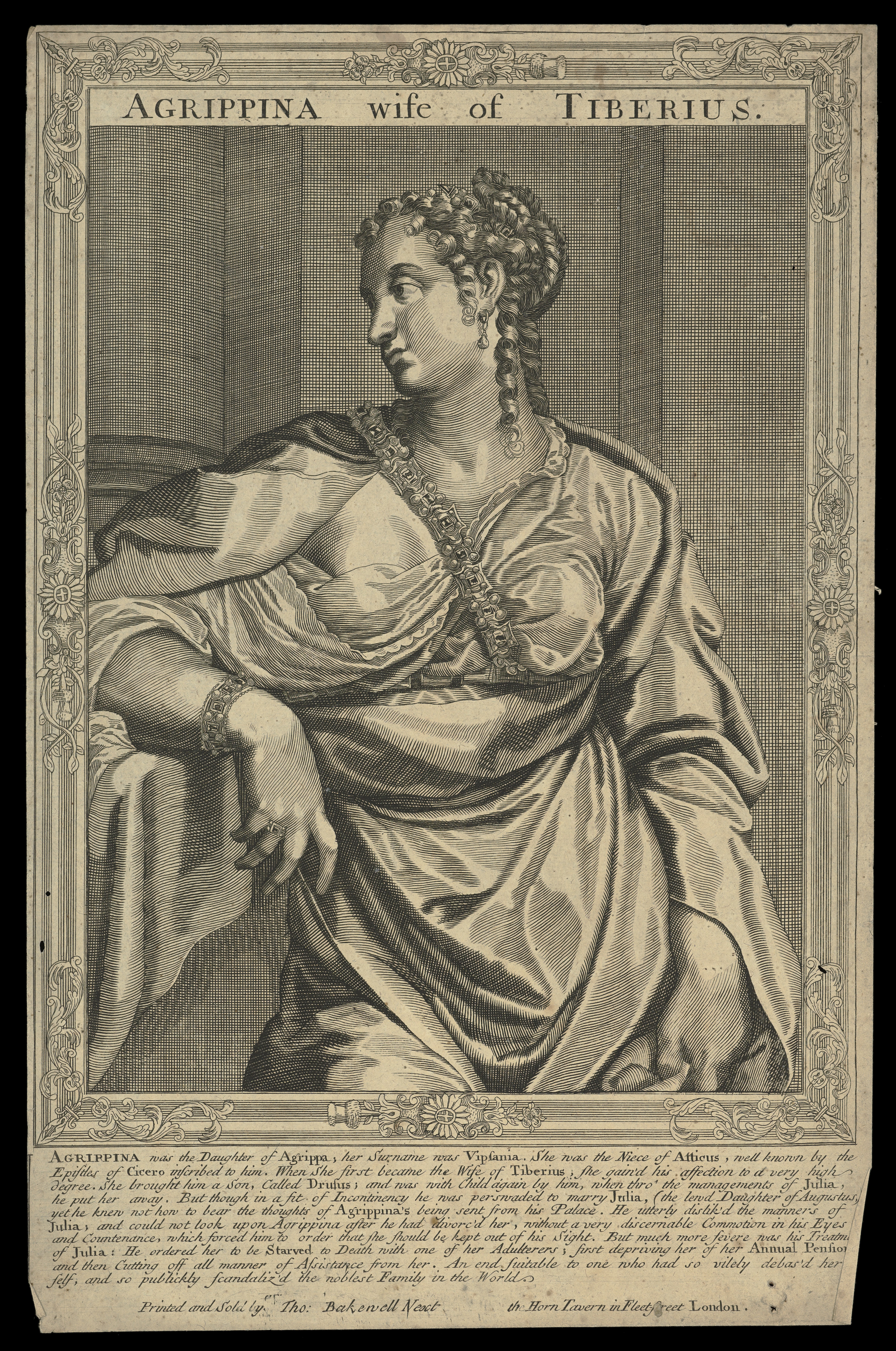
Vipsania Agrippina, wife of Tiberius

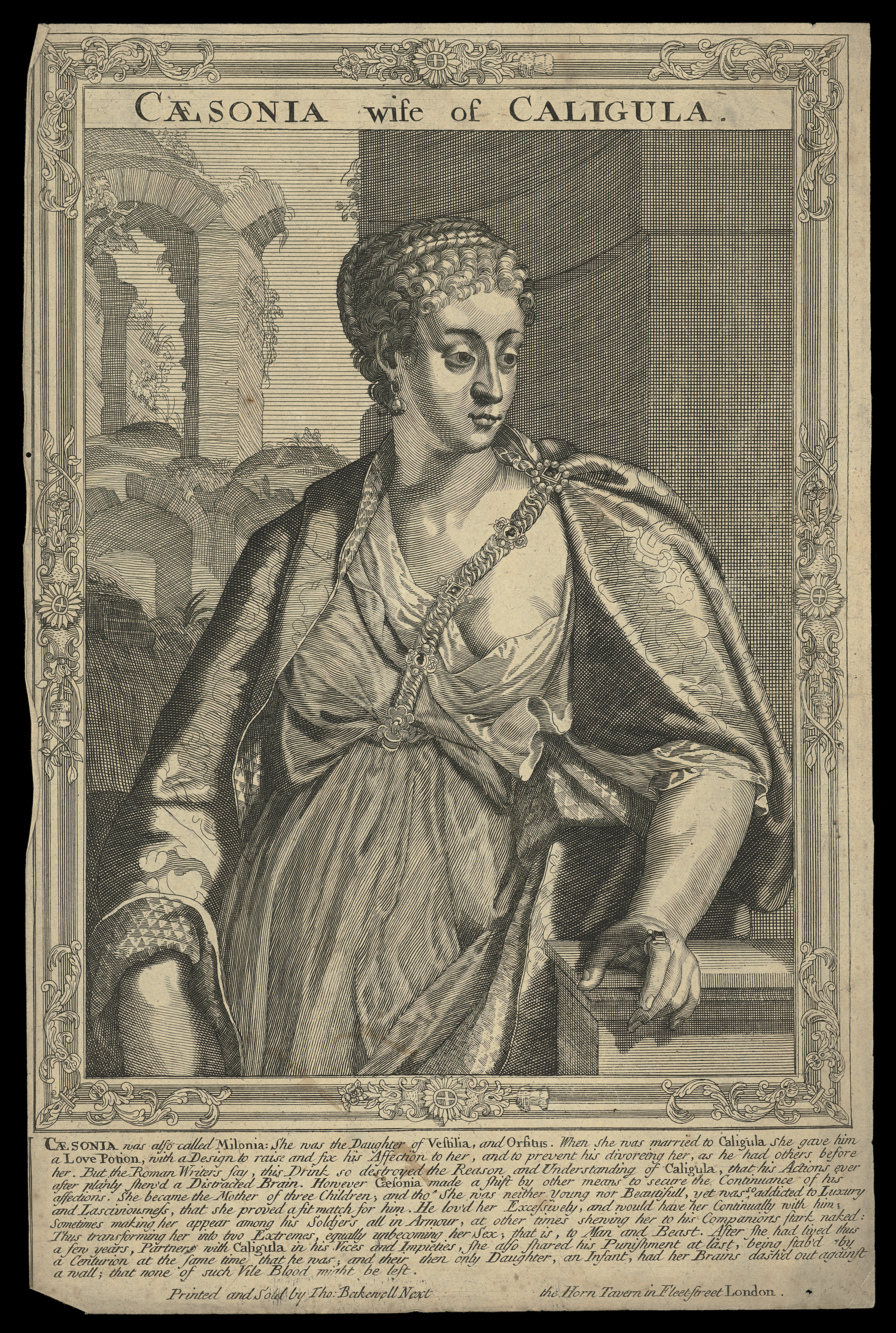
Milonia Caesonia, wife of Caligula

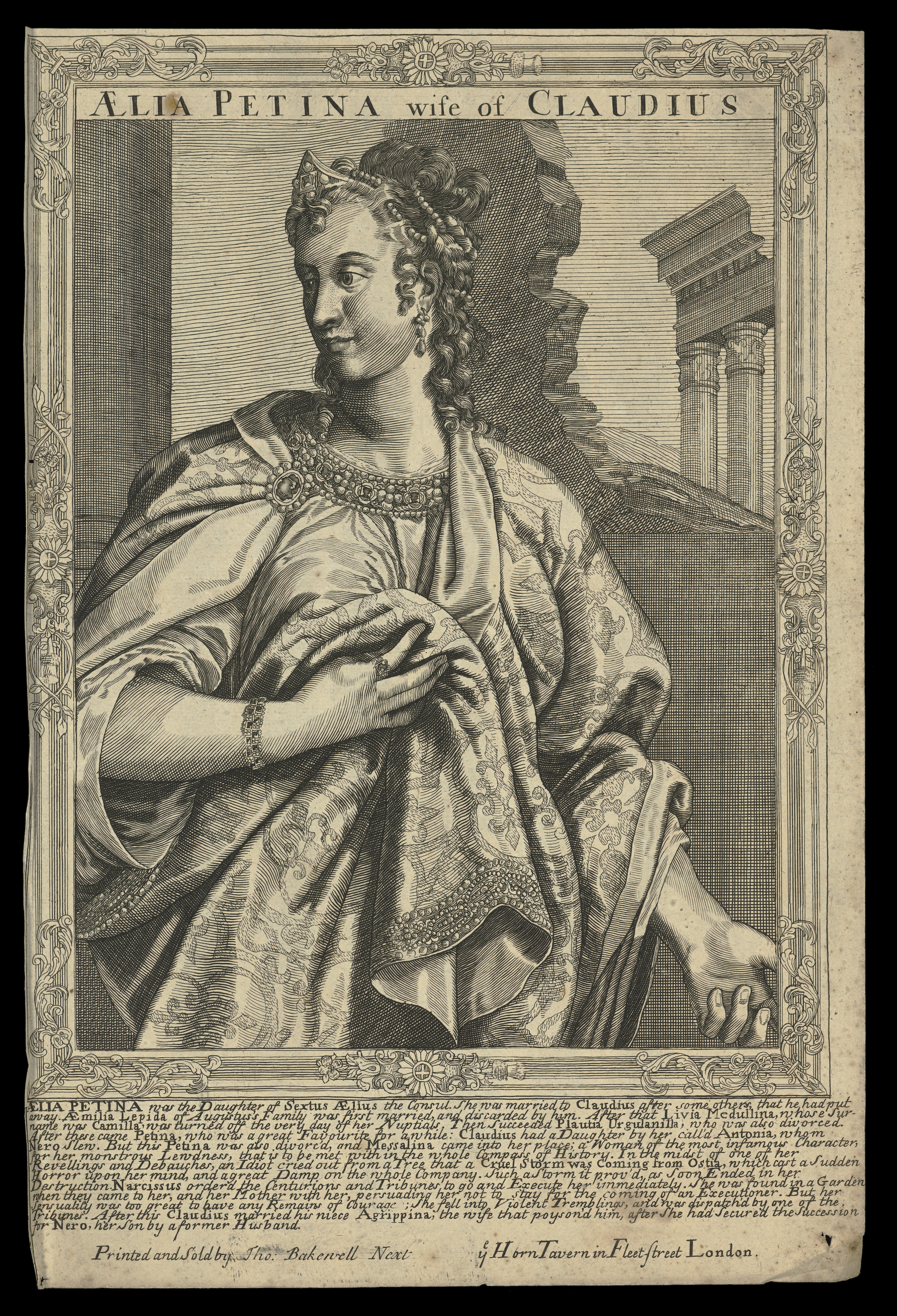
Aelia Paetina, wife of Claudius

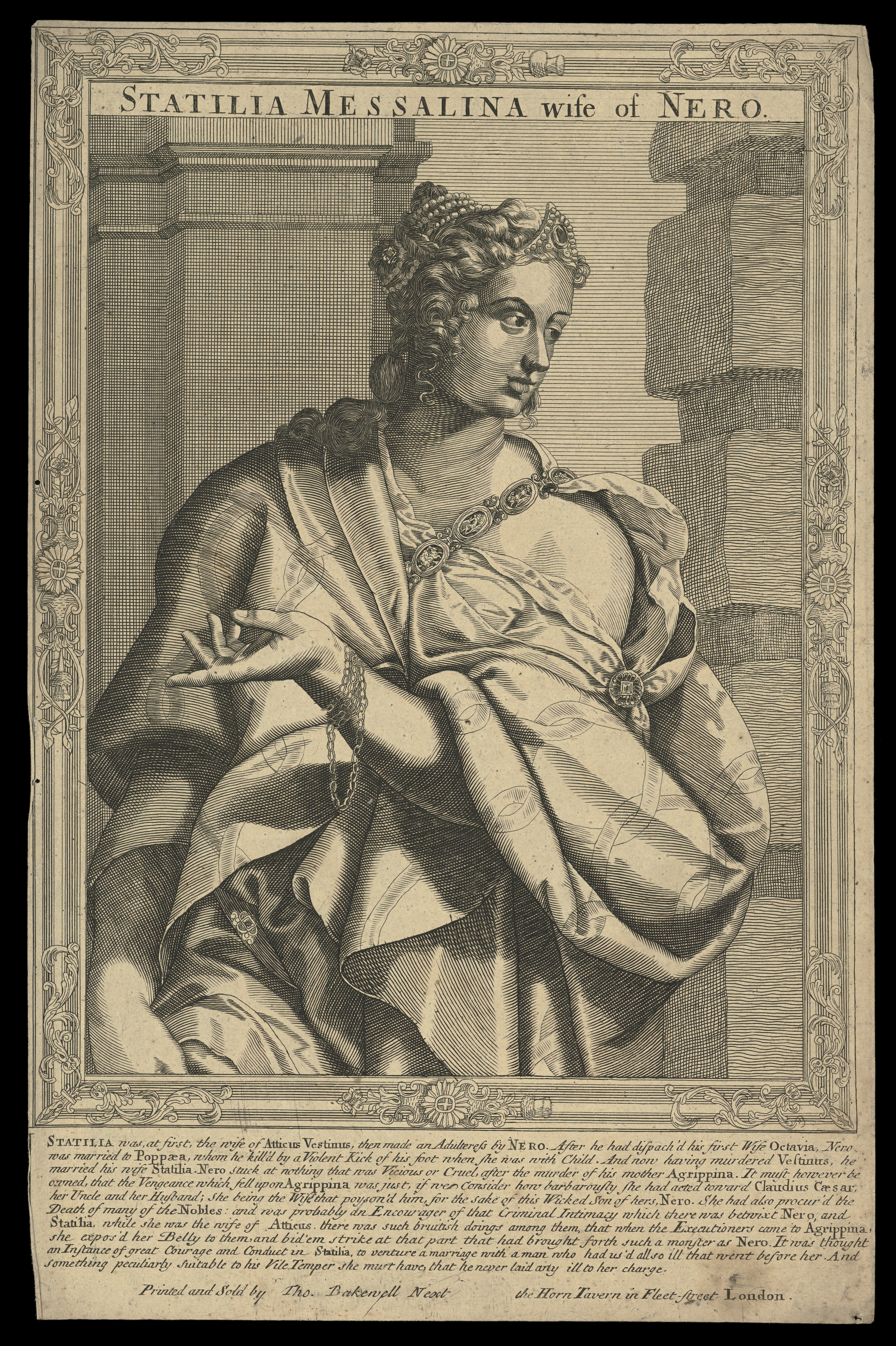
Statilia Messalina, wife of Nero

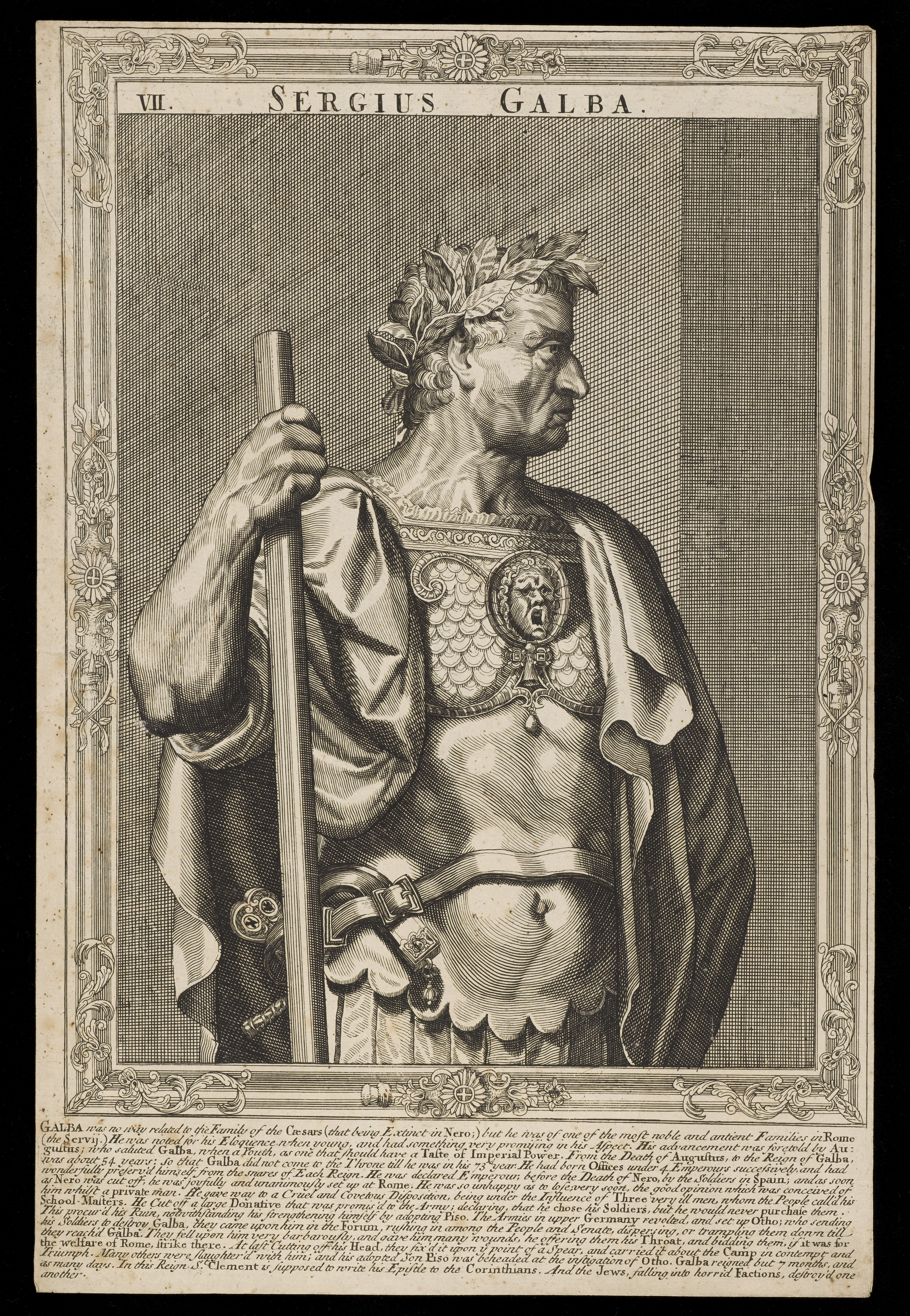
Galba

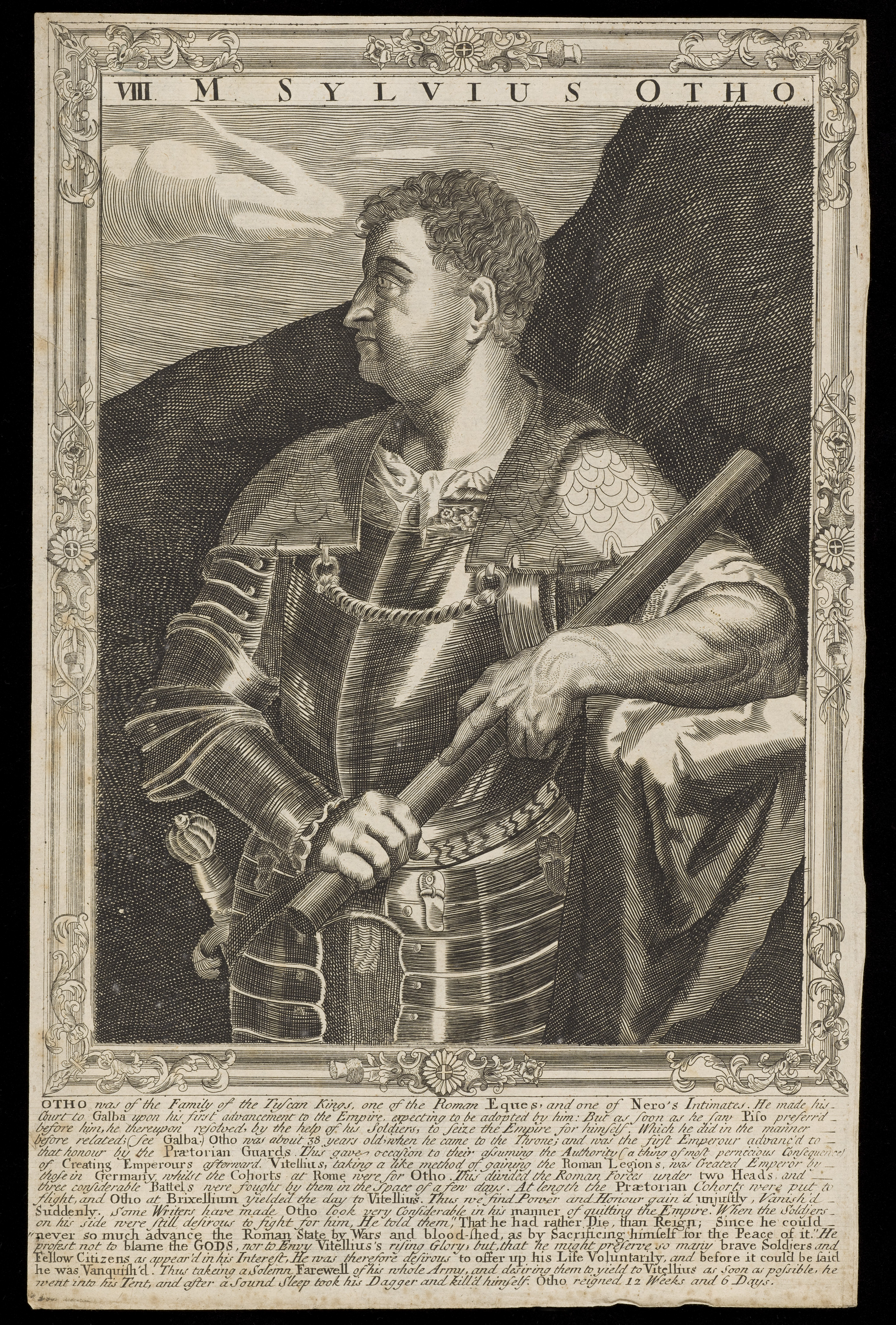
Otho

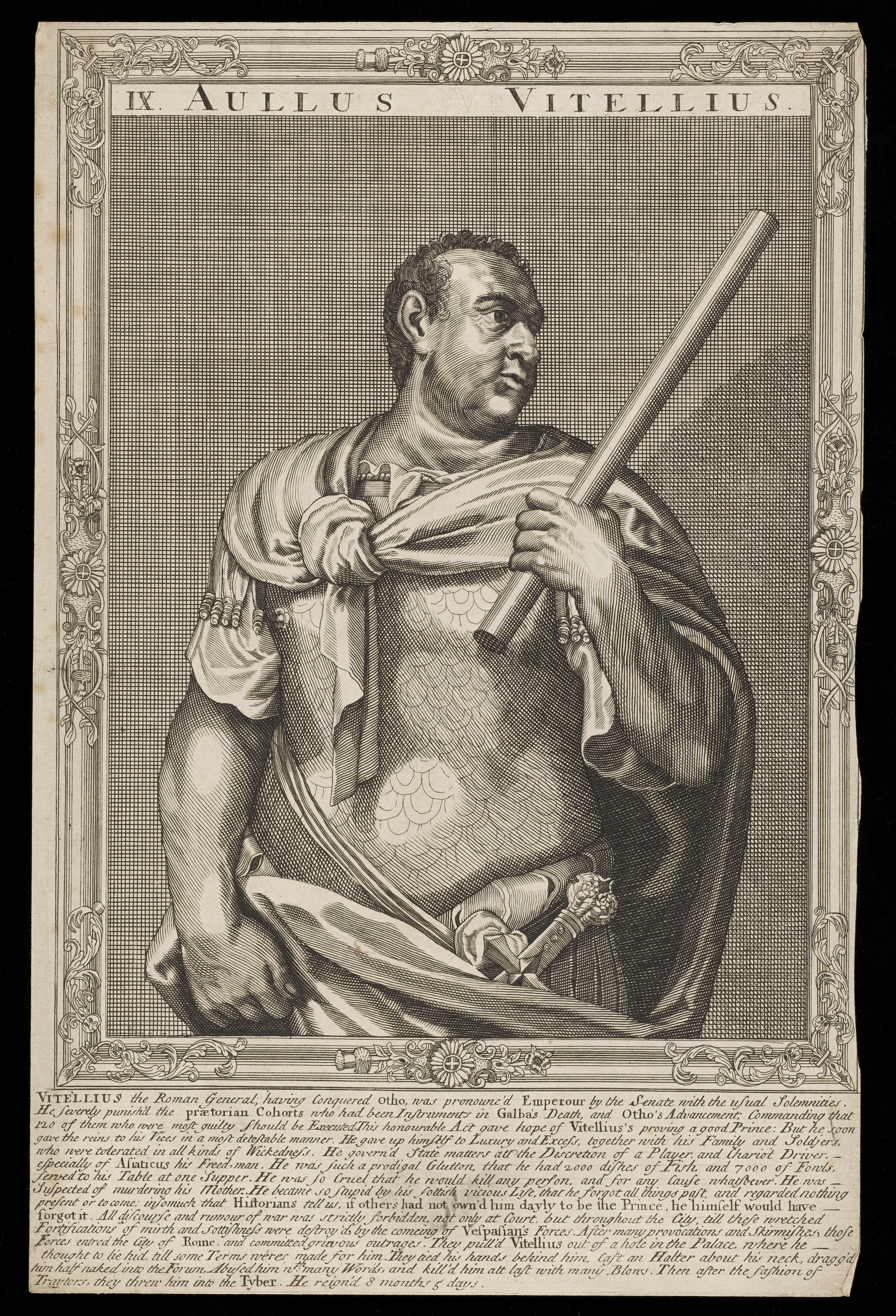
Vitellius

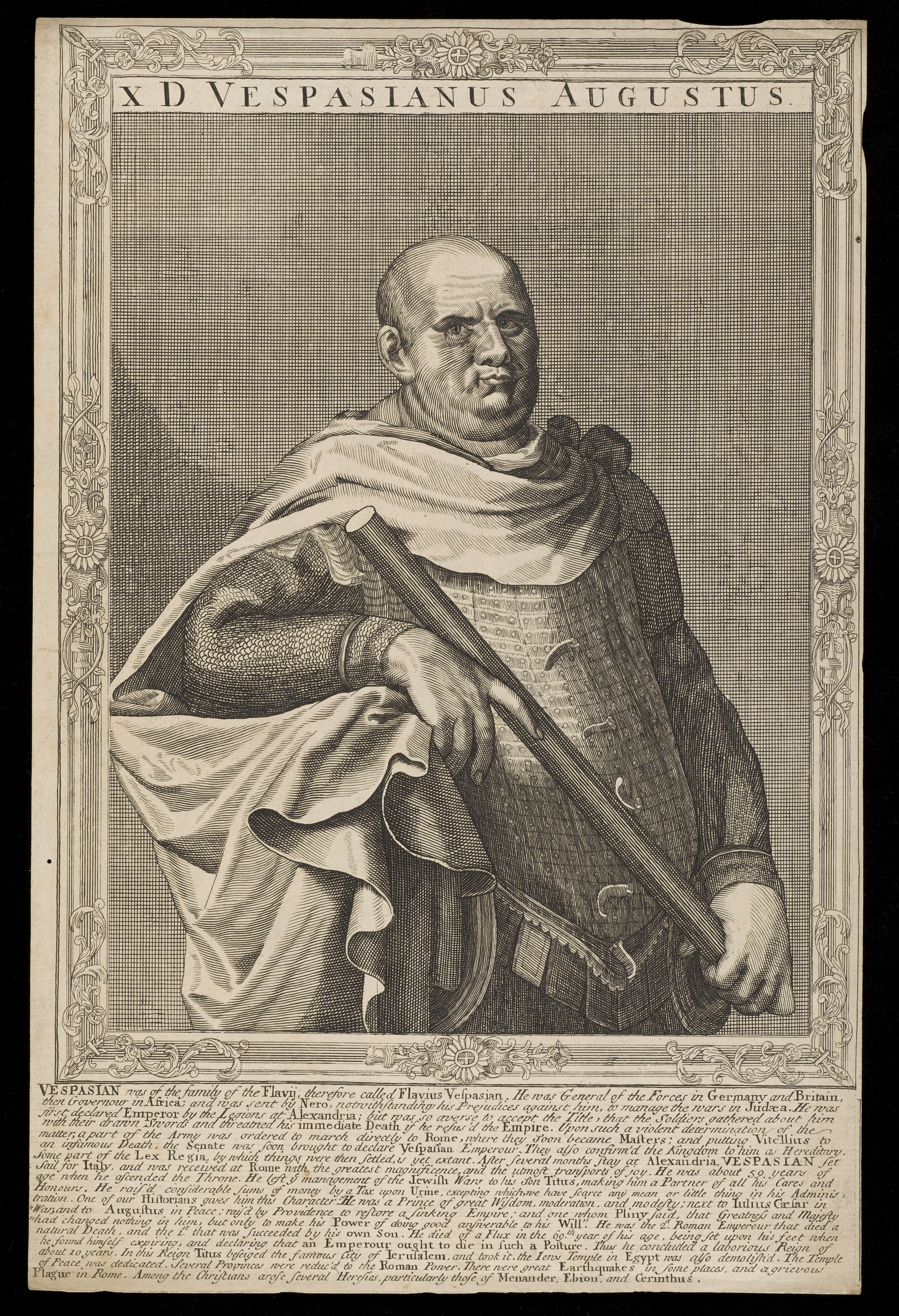
Vespasian

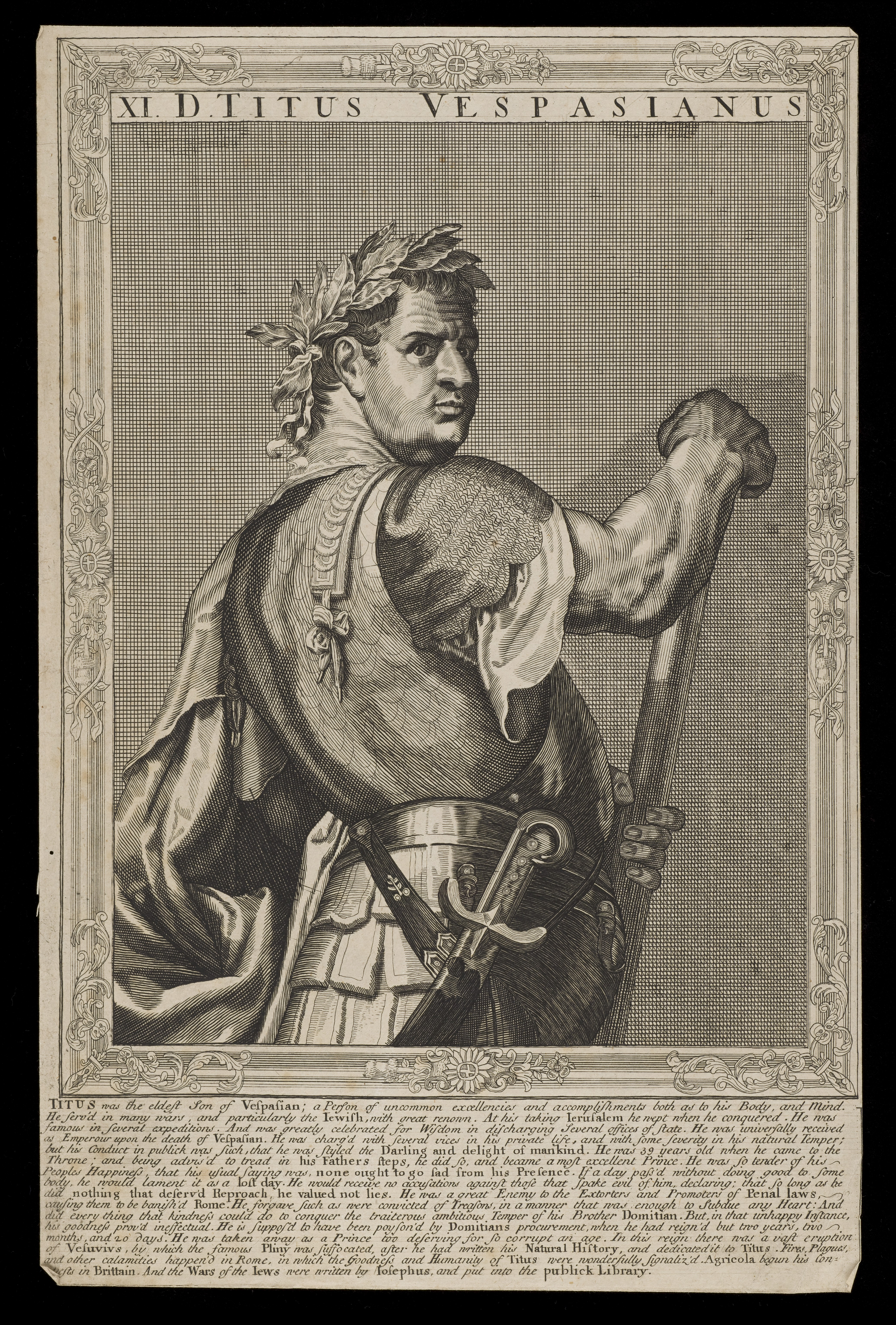
Titus

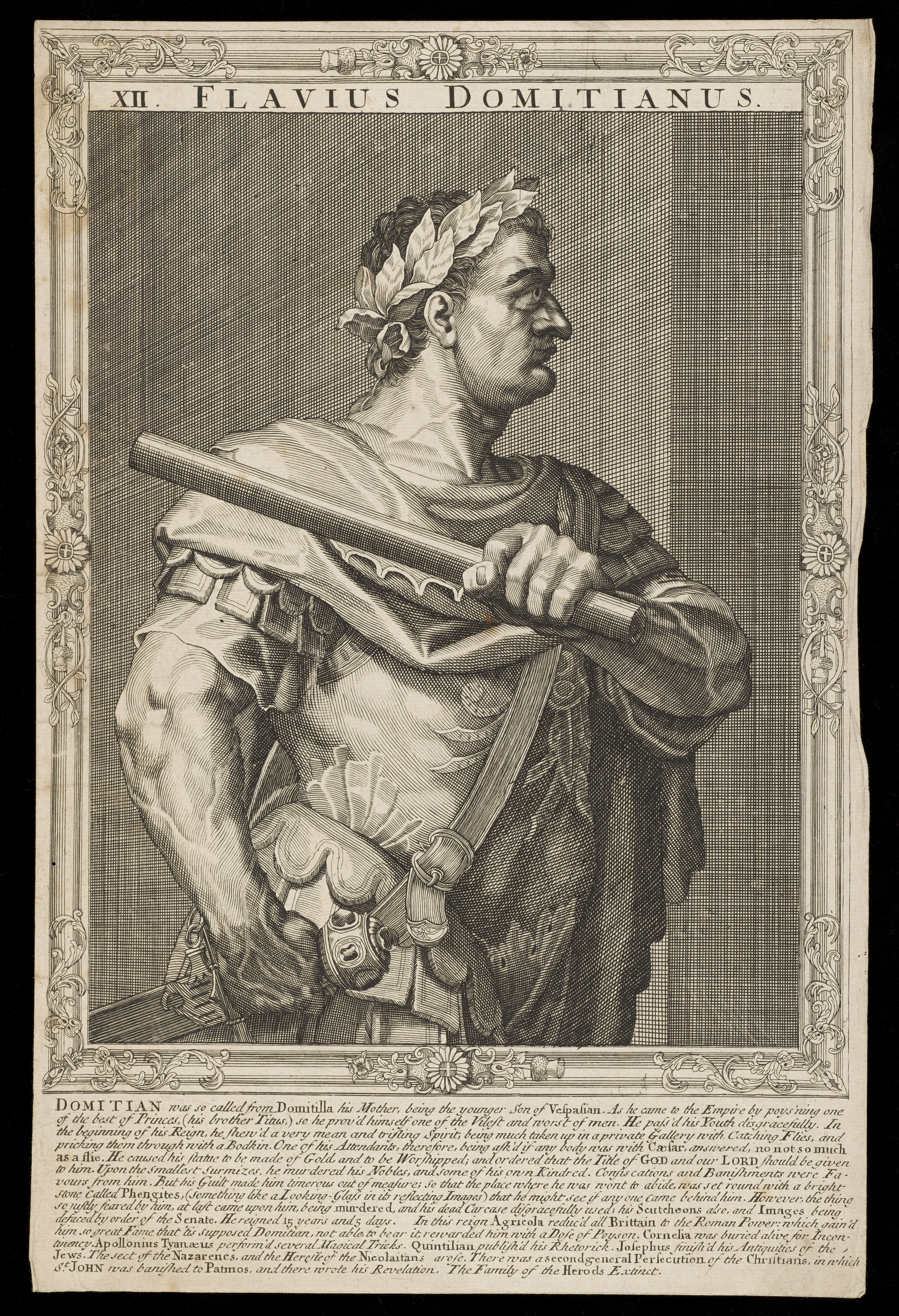
Domitian, after Giulio Romano

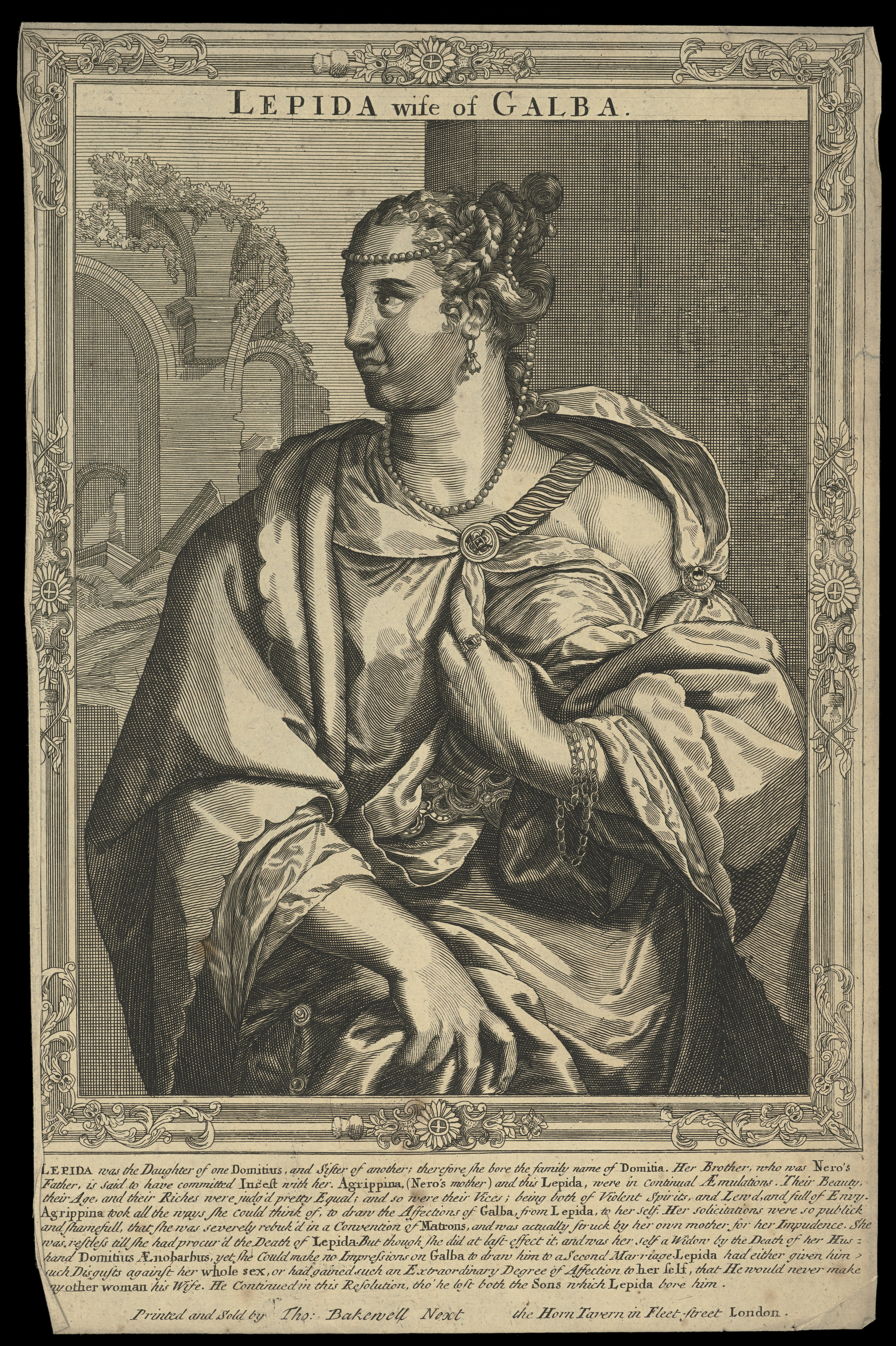
Aemilia Lepida, wife of Galba

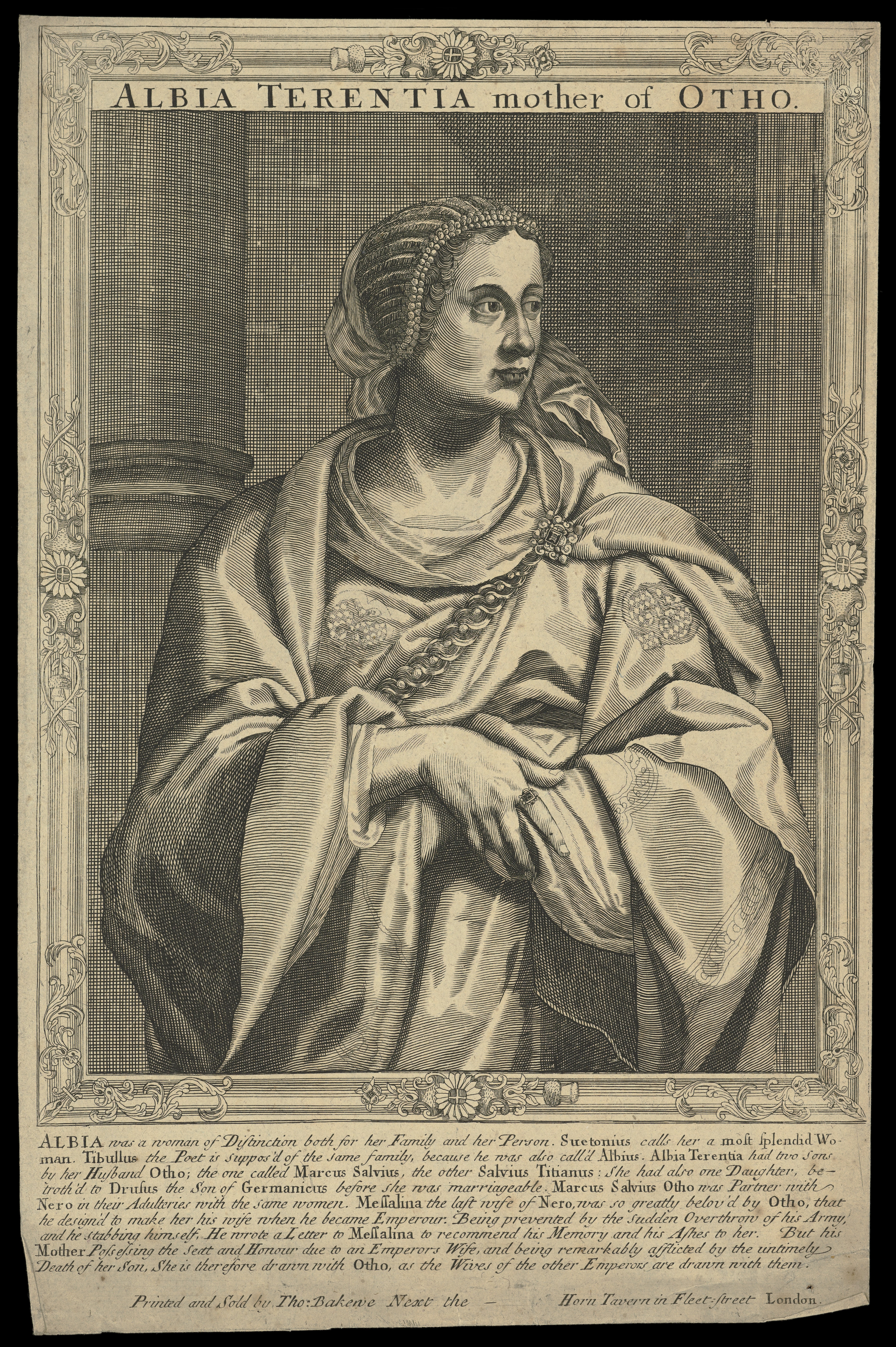
Albia Terentia, mother of Otho

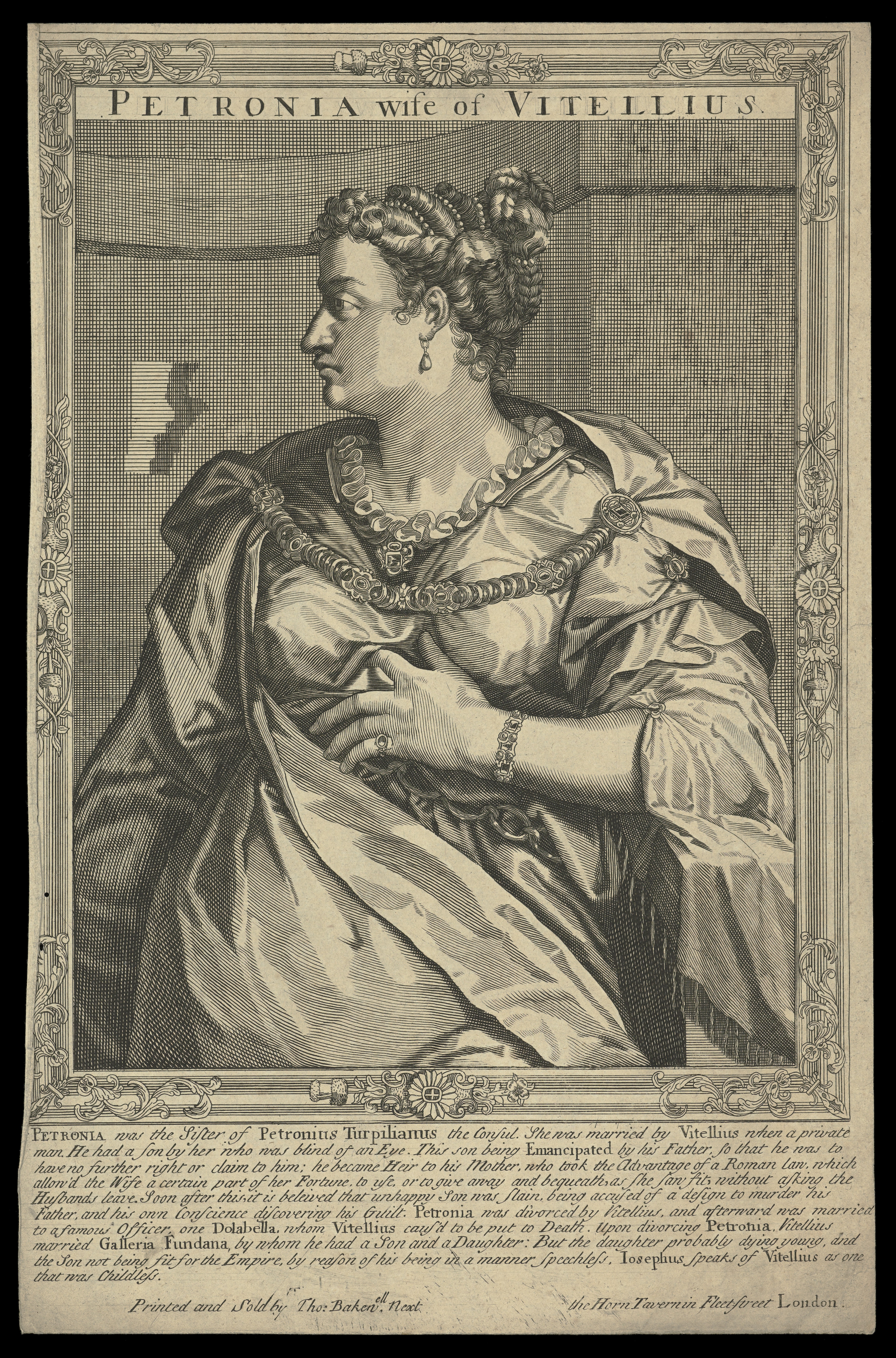
Petronia, wife of Vitellius

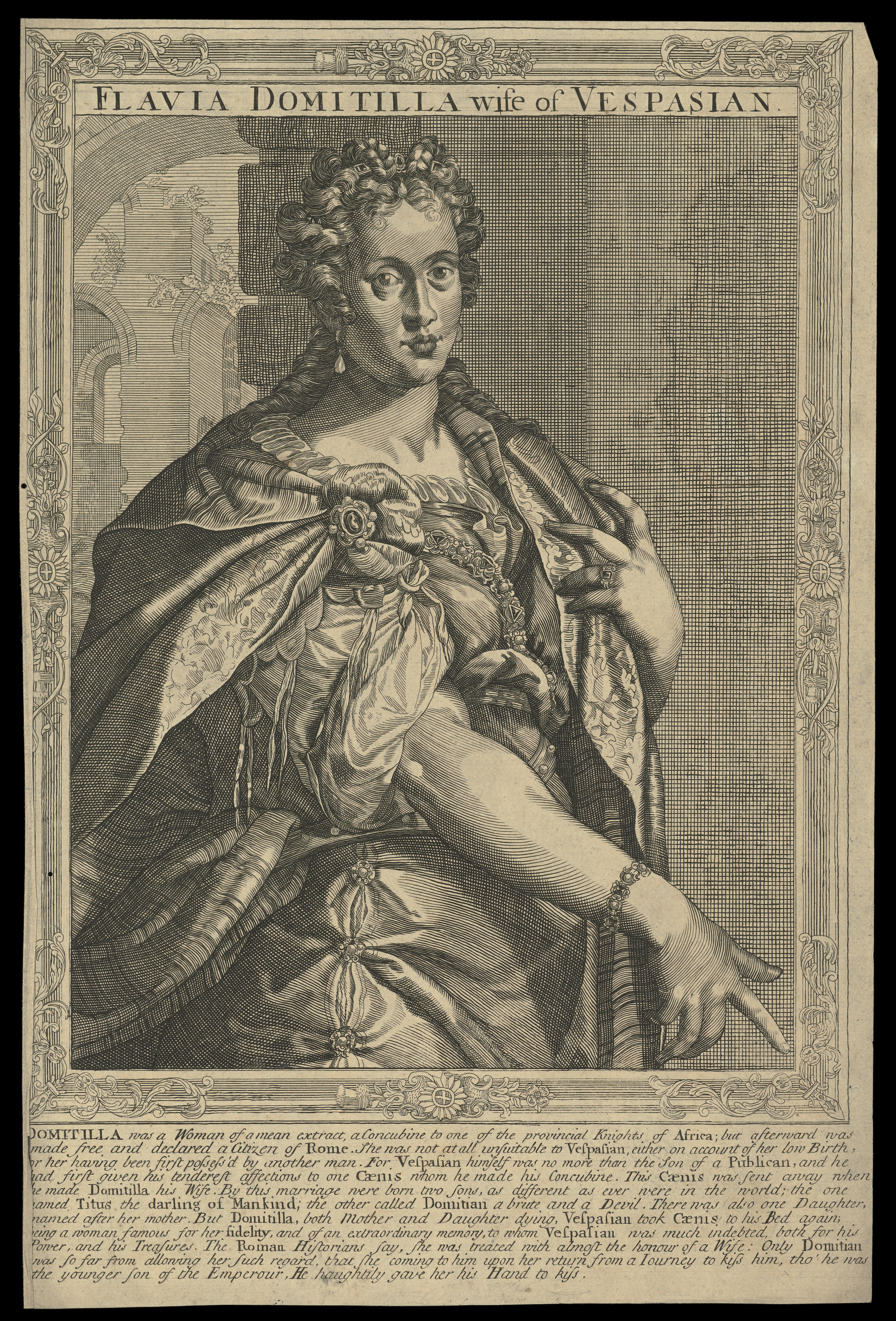
Flavia Domitilla, wife of Vespasian

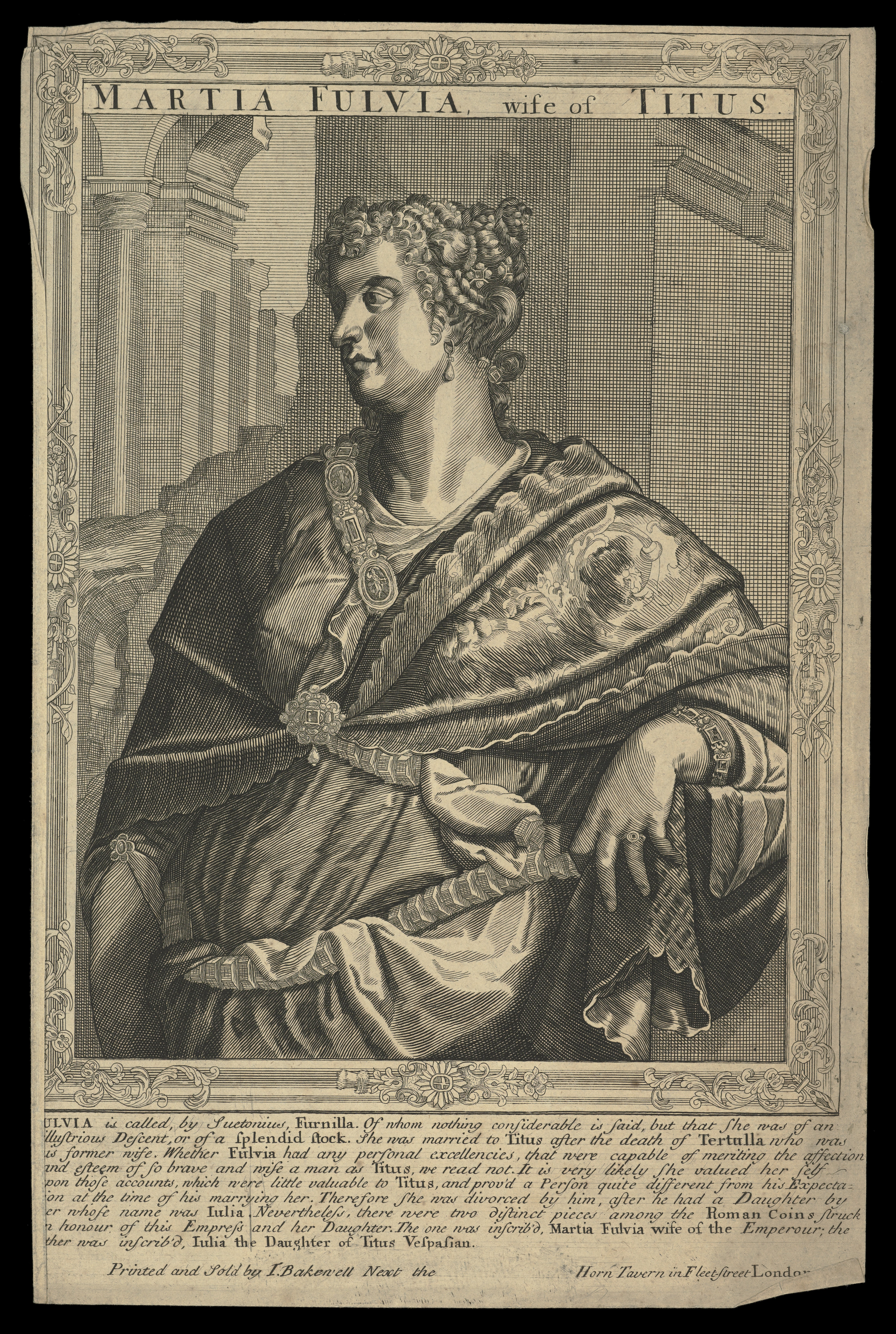
Martia Fulvia (Marcia Furnilla), wife of Titus

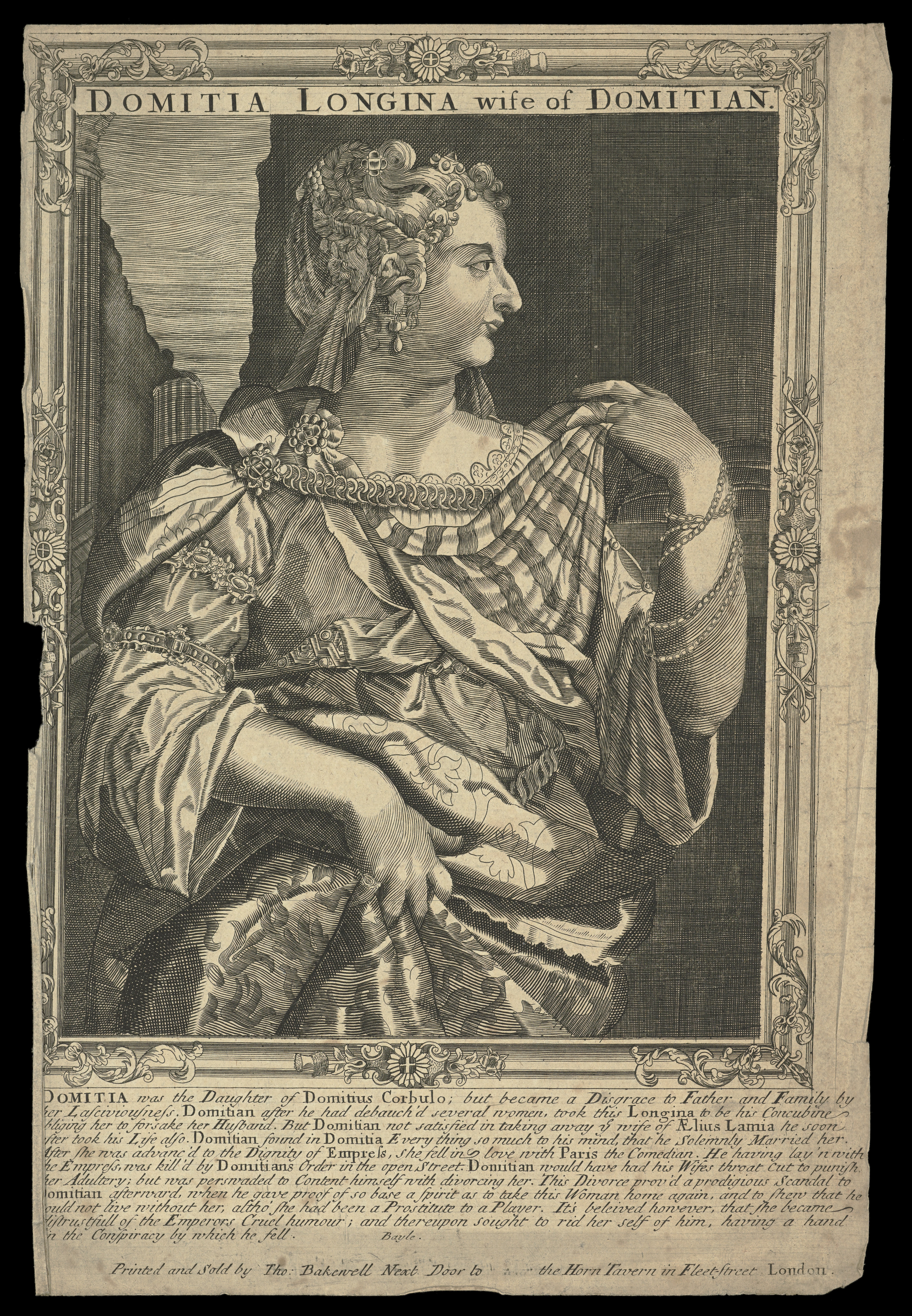
Domitia Longina, wife of Domitian

== See also ==
- List of works by Titian

== Sources ==
- F. Valcanover, L'opera completa di Tiziano, Milano 1969, p. 109 (in Italian)
- Titian Portraits of Roman Emperors and Empresses, George Glazer Gallery
- The Life of Titian, Carlo Ridolfi, Penn State Press, 2010, ISBN 027104053X, p.86
- Heroic Armor of the Italian Renaissance: Filippo Negroli and His Contemporaries, Stuart W. Pyhrr, Filippo Negroli, José-A. Godoy, Silvio Leydi, Metropolitan Museum of Art (New York, N.Y.), p.149-152
- Giulio Romano, Nero playing while Rome burns, from the Cabinet of the Caesars; Royal Collection
