= The Washing of the Feet =

Painting by Tintoretto created between 1548 and 1549

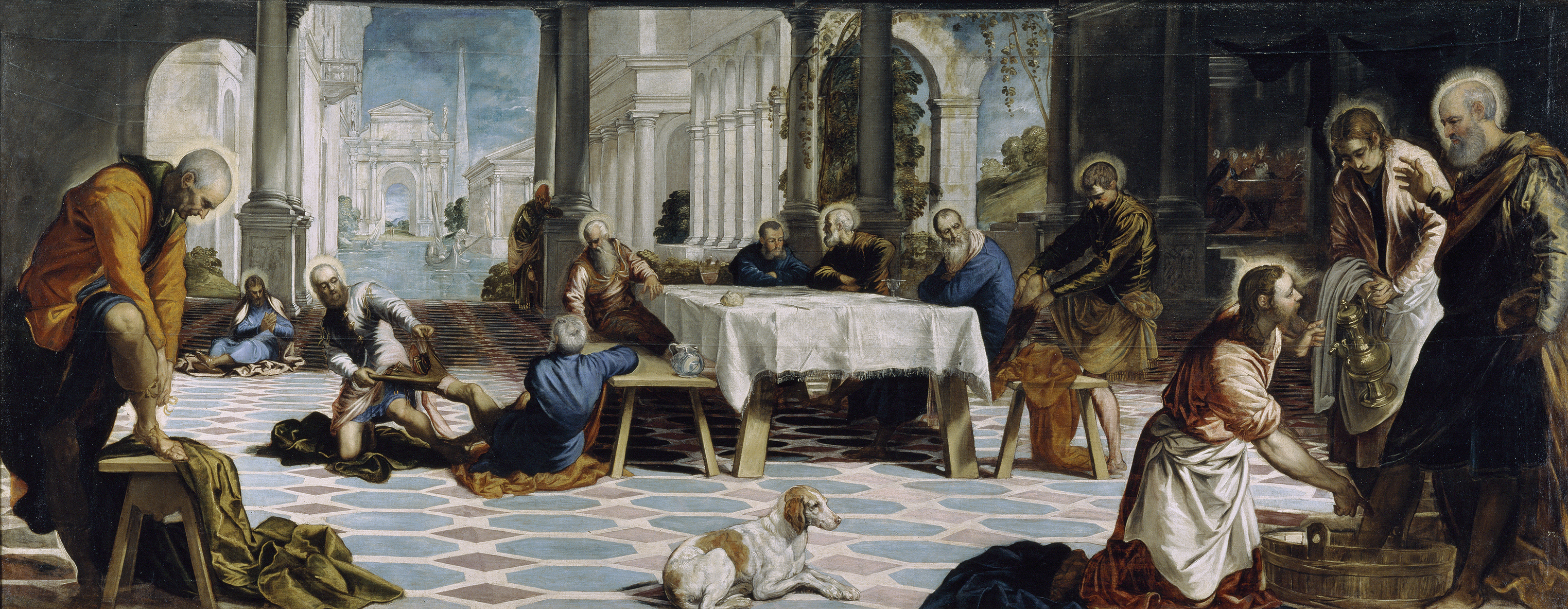
- Artist: Tintoretto
- Year: 1548-1549
- Medium: Oil on canvas
- Dimensions: 210 cm × 533 cm (83 in × 210 in)
- Location: Museo del Prado; Madrid

The Washing of the Feet or El Lavatorio is a work by the Venetian artist Tintoretto which he produced between 1548 and 1549. It is considered one of his finest works. It is currently on display in the Museo del Prado.

== History ==
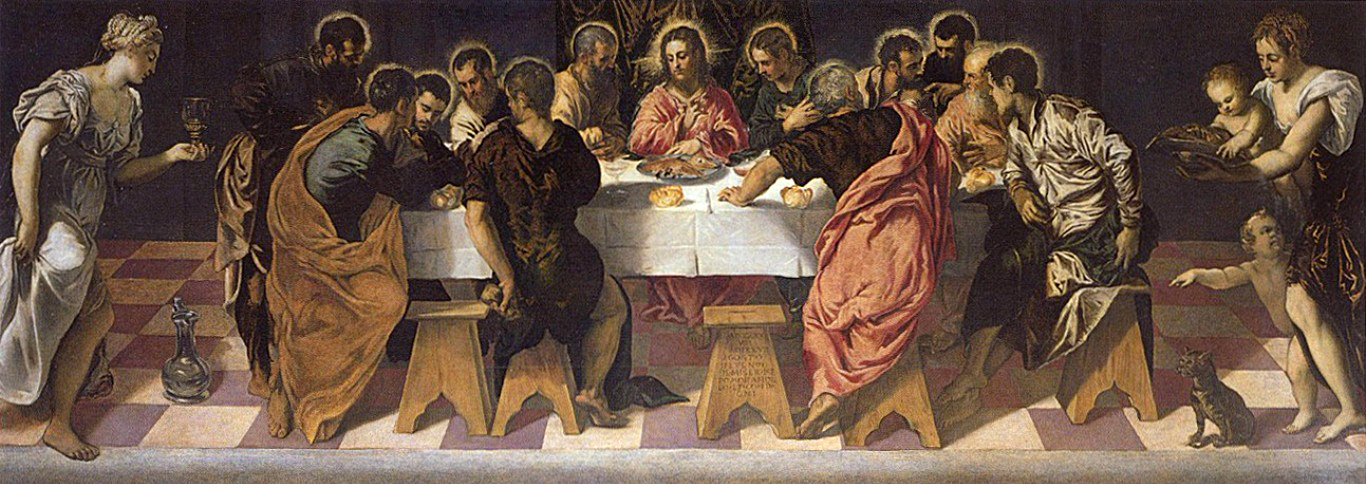
The Last Supper by Tintoretto still "in situ" in the church of San Marcuola in Venice.

The work was commissioned in 1547 from Tintoretto for the Scuola del Santísimo Sacramento in the church of San Marcuola in Venice, together with a Last Supper, which is still in the church, painted between 1548 and 1549.

After remaining there for 70 years, The Washing of the Feet was acquired by Ferdinando Gonzaga, VI Duke of Mantua, at the end of the first decade or at the beginning of the second decade of the 17th century, where the Corridoio del Bertani of the Ducal Palace of Mantua was placed.

In 1627 it was bought by Charles I of England, a great collector of art. After the English Revolution and the execution of the monarch, the parliamentarians sold his works to pay off the monarch's debts. Many of the best works were left in the hands of the Spanish ambassador Don Alonso de Cardenas, who gave them to the Prime Minister Don Luis Méndez de Haro, who presented them to Philip IV among them: The Washing of the Feet.

== Painting ==
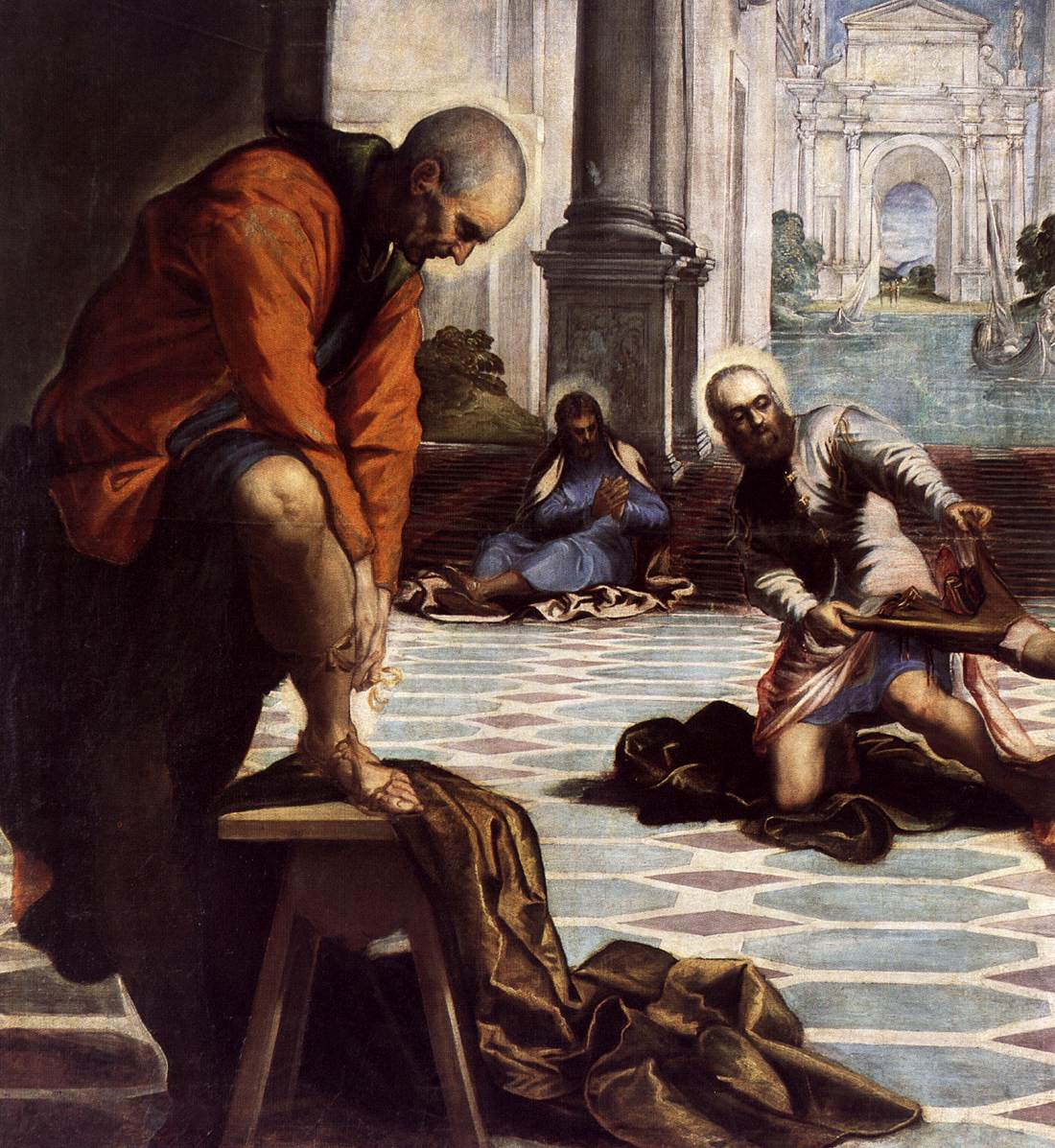
Detail showing the influence of Michelangelo's anatomy on the artist.

The painting depicts a scene from the Gospel of John in which it is narrated that at the Last Supper Jesus rose from the table, took off his cloak and tied a towel around his waist and began to wash his disciples' feet. Tintoretto depicts the moment when Simon Peter tries to refuse, but after being persuaded he agrees to wash his feet and even his head and hands.

A miracle of Saint Mark is also depicted in one corner, recounted by Jacopo da Varazze in his book Golden Legend.

Most of the painting depicts the scene of the Last Supper. In the centre is a dog lying down, perhaps because the space would have been too large without it or representing the faithfulness of Jesus' disciples.

The artist had painted the composition of the painting with the space of the church of San Marcuola in mind, which is why, seen from the front, the figures may appear to be randomly distributed, but the impression changes when seen from the right, as the dead spaces disappear and the harmony of the figures is achieved.

== Bibliography ==
-"Very interesting magazine special 200 years of the Prado Museum", pág.13.

- Cirlot, L. (dir.), Museo del Prado II, Col. «Museos del Mundo», Volume 7, Espasa, 2007. ISBN 978-84-674-3810-9, págs. 164-167.

-"A restored masterpiece. The Lavatorioa by Jacopo Tintoretto", Ref-ART3-149.
