= Luis Méndez de Haro =

Spanish political figure and art collector

The Most Excellent The Marquis of Carpio GE
- Don Luis de Haro y Guzmán, anonymous painting from the Uffizi Gallery

Valido of the King of Spain
- In office 23 January 1643 – 16 November 1661
- Monarch: Philip IV
- Preceded by: Gaspar de Guzmán, Count-Duke of Olivares
- Succeeded by: Gaspar Méndez de Haro

Personal details
- Born: 17 February 1598 Valladolid, Crown of Castile, Spain
- Died: 16 November 1661 (aged 63) Madrid, Crown of Castile, Spain
- Spouse: Catalina Fernández de Córdoba-Figueroa y Enríquez de Ribera (m. 1625)
- Parents: Diego Lopez de Haro y Sotomayor (father); Francisca de Guzman y Pimentel (mother)

Luis Méndez de Haro, 6th Marquis of Carpio and 2nd Duke of Olivares or Luis Méndez de Haro y Guzmán, GE, (17 February 1598 – 16 November 1661), was a Spanish political figure, general and art collector. He was the royal favourite (Spanish: valido) of Philip IV. De Haro was also notable as being one of the very few Spanish royal favourites of the period to die whilst still in favour.

== Biography ==
=== Early years ===
Coat of Arms of the Marquesses of Carpio.

Luis Méndez de Haro y Guzmán was the son of Diego de Haro, the marquis of Carpio, and of doña Francisca de Guzmán, the sister of Gaspar de Guzmán, Count-Duke of Olivares. Little is known about his childhood and early youth. He probably spent most of his early years between his native Valladolid, which became the seat of the court between 1601 and 1606, and Madrid, where the King later returned. Haro was one of the king’s childhood friends and spent the first twenty years of Philip's reign as a gentleman of the bedchamber. This post allowed him to develop a close personal relationship with the king which eventually bore fruit in the years following the downfall of his uncle.

In his youth Haro was a close friend of the Count of Villamediana. He was in his coach with him when Villamediana was stabbed to death by an unknown assailant in 1622. Haro tried to capture the aggressor but stumbled and fell. The scandal at court was notable, given Villamediana's reputation as a caustic poet, who had made many political enemies and was implicated in a trial on sodomy. Luis must have learned then the importance of prudence. He would never again put his reputation at risk.

Haro inherited the Marquessate of Carpio and the Countship of Morente from his father in 1648, and the Marquessate of Eliche from his mother. At the death of the Count-Duke in July 1645 the title and inheritance of the counts of Olivares passed to Haro who came into the ownership of extensive landed possessions and of the dignity of grandee.

=== Political career ===
Méndez de Haro made a career at the Spanish court under the protection of his uncle, the Count-Duke, whom he succeeded as Valido or the court favourite who enjoyed the friendship and trust of the King and who wielded political power, after the Count-Duke was driven from office in 1643. That same year the Duke of Híjar, who aspired to succeed Olivares as Valido, planned a conspiracy against him, which cost him exile from Court. Haro would never exert the same type of influence or control as his uncle had, mainly due to King Philip IV's reliance upon Sister María de Ágreda's counsel. María was uncompromisingly hostile towards Philip's delegation of authority upon a valido and thought that the king should rule on his own. She advocated the distancing of Olivares from the centre of power, and she suggested that Haro should also be removed. However Philip did not abolish the valimiento, but decided to hold on to it and stage it in more understated fashion.

Rather more modest and discreet than Olivares, Haro was tactful, humble and prudent. His courteous manner provided a welcome contrast to the abrasive tactlessness of Olivares. Where Olivares had tried to master the king, Haro was always his friend. A sign of his apparent modesty is the scarcity of his portraits: no oil painting of him survives and the six that exist are all by anonymous authors.

=== Foreign policy ===
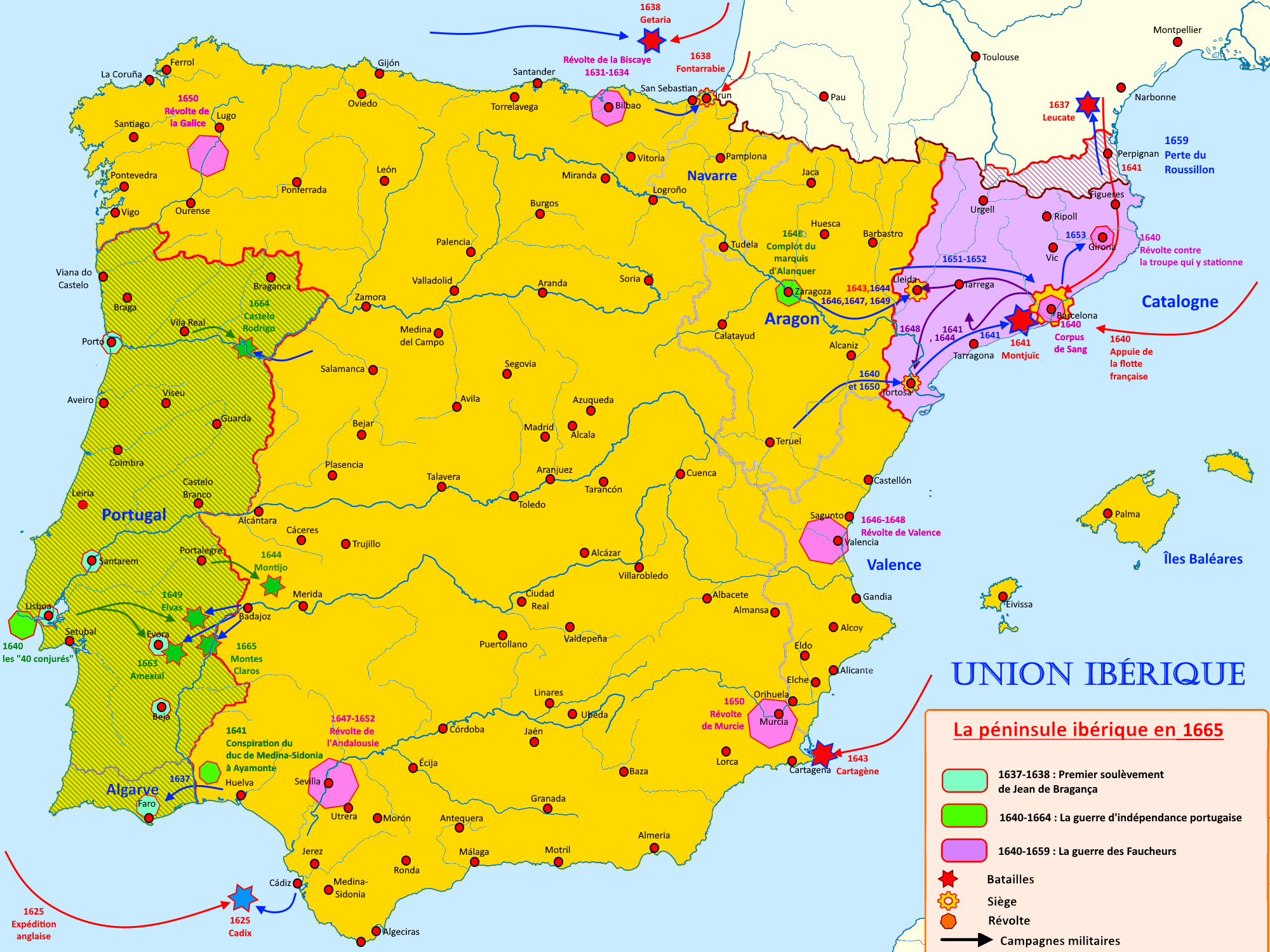
Map of the Iberian Peninsula in 1665, showing the Restoration War, the Reapers' War and the Thirty Years' War

In April 1650 and November 1651 Haro negotiated the alliances between Spain and the rebel princes of France. The more significant alliance was made with the Grand Condé. According to its terms, Condé was given the status of an ally of the king of Spain, which obliged Philip to keep him supplied with arms and subsidies until Louis agreed to make peace with Spain and permitted the full restoration of the rebel princes to the titles, lands and offices that had been confiscated from them at the time of their Fronde revolt. The alliance between Philip IV and France's first prince of the blood would become the central aspect of Haro's foreign policy until the Peace of the Pyrenees in 1659.

Eager to gain British backing in the war against France, Haro convinced Philip to officially recognize the Commonwealth of England and made every effort to secure a treaty with the Lord Protector - even, in 1654, indicating his willingness to recognize Cromwell as King. Cromwell's undeclared war on Spain, however, prompted Philip IV to withdraw his ambassador, and declare war on Britain.

A commercial treaty between England and France was signed on the very day that the Spanish Ambassador Alonso de Cárdenas left England (October 24, 1655). Upon hearing the news, Haro promptly fashioned an agreement with Charles Stuart whereby the Spanish would finance a Royalist army to support an uprising in England; Charles, for his part, promised that, on his accession, he would return Jamaica to Spain and suspend England's laws against Catholics.

Haro greatly improved the organization and general efficiency of the Army. His main political and military success was the suppression of the Catalan uprising, and the reconquest of Barcelona in 1652. Haro was also able to claim success in the suppression of rebellion in Spain's Italian possessions. In the summer of 1658 he assumed command of the military operations against Portugal and achieved the lifting of the Portuguese siege of Badajoz (1658). Taking advantage of this success, Haro, invaded Portugal and besieged Elvas, the main defensive system of Portugal - where the Portuguese army that had besieged Badajoz took refuge and was suffering a catastrophic plague. However the Portuguese managed to gather a relief army which inflicted a crushing defeat to the Spanish army at the decisive battle of the Lines of Elvas (14 January 1659).

Luis de Méndez Haro was the main Spanish negotiator of the Treaty of the Pyrenees on Pheasant Island in 1659. He was unable to avoid any perceived negative result of the treaty, nor was he able to reach an anti-French accord with the Lord Protector of the Commonwealth of England, Scotland, and Ireland, Oliver Cromwell. The treaty was accompanied by the marriage of King Louis XIV of France and the Infanta Maria Theresa of Spain. Luis de Méndez Haro played the part of the bridegroom in the proxy marriage that took place at Fuenterrabia on 3 June 1660.

Haro died on 16 November 1661. He was buried in the Church of the Novitiate of the Society of Jesus in Madrid. On December 31, 1662, his remains were moved to the Dominican convent of Loeches, founded by the Count-Duke of Olivares. Baltasar Gracián's Oráculo manual, José Pellicer's El Fénix y su historia natural and Juan de Espinosa Medrano's Apologético were dedicated to him.

=== Contemporary assessment ===
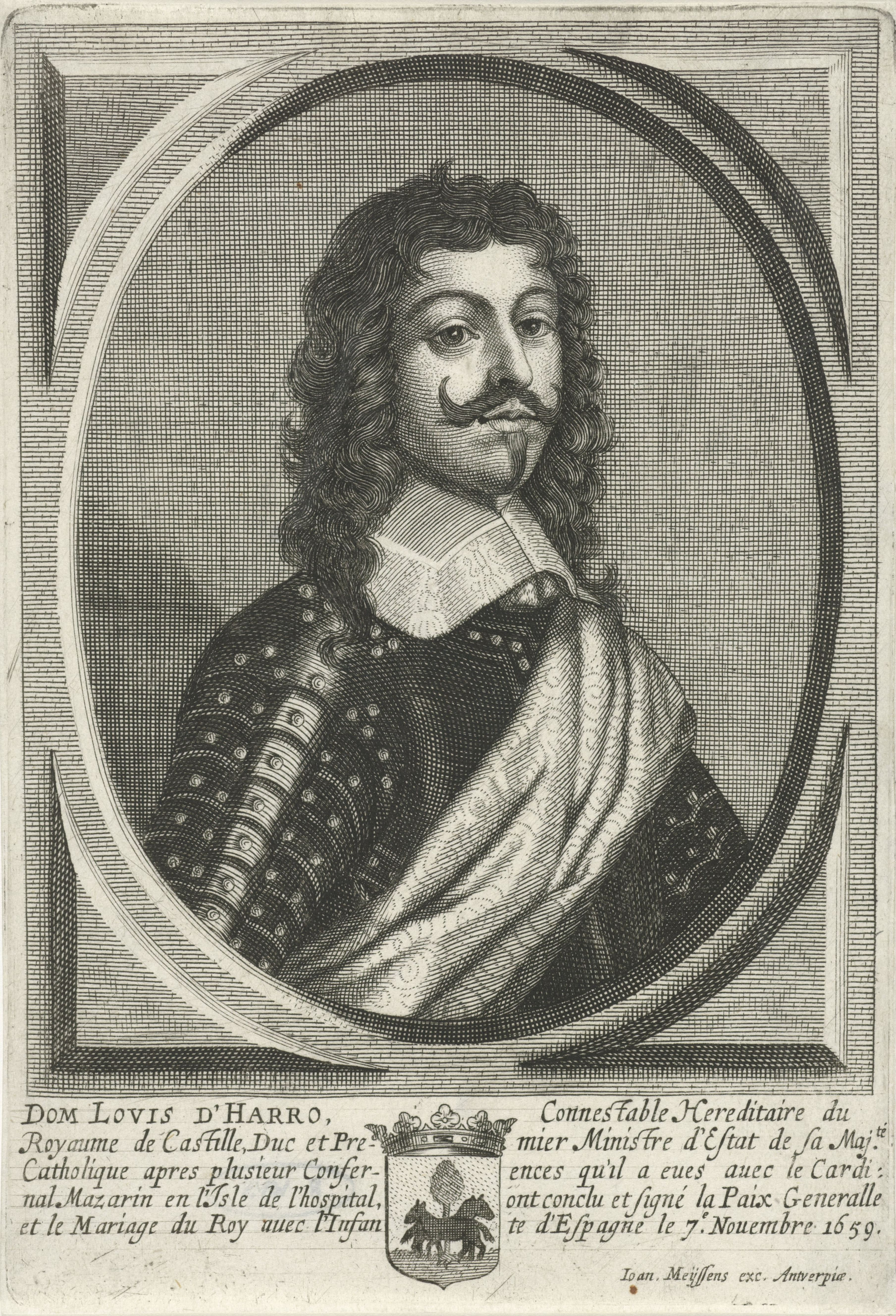
Portrait of Luis Méndez de Haro y Guzmán by Cornelis Meyssens

Haro was highly praised by his contemporaries for his honesty and integrity. In the sixth crisi of the first part of the Criticón, Gracián referred to him as ‘la integridad, la rectitud, la verdad y todo lo bueno en uno’ (Integrity, righteousness, truth and all good things in one). Haro was immortalized in a panegyric by his chaplain, Diego Fernández de Medrano y Zenizeros, titled 'Heroic and Flying Fame of the Most Excellent Lord Don Luis Méndez de Haro, Count-Duke of Olivares.' Medrano credited Haro with restoring the Spanish Monarchy and praised his pivotal role in negotiating the Peace of the Pyrenees, calling him the "Archpolitician of the world."

Haro's foremost critics were the members of the party aligned with the papacy, especially the mystic Mary of Jesus of Ágreda and the Dominican theologian and philosopher John of St. Thomas, Philip IV’s confessor between 1643 and 1644.

=== Marriage and children ===
On 26 April 1625, in Barcelona, Luis Méndez de Haro married Catalina (26 April 1610 – 19 November 1647), the youngest daughter of Enrique de Córdoba Cardona y Aragón. They had 5 children:

- Gaspar (1629–1687), his successor and the Viceroy of Naples.
- Juan Domingo (1640–1716), Governor of the Habsburg Netherlands and the Viceroy of Catalonia.
- Francisco was an illegitimate son of Luis, but acknowledged by his father. Francisco may have been conceived before Luis's marriage, while involved as majordomo for the young future King Felipe IV
- Antonia, who married Gaspar Juan Pérez de Guzmán, 10th Duke of Medina Sidonia.
- Manuela, who married Gaspar Vigil de Quiñones Alonso Pimentel y Benavides.
- María Méndez (1644–1693), who married Gregorio María Domingo de Silva Mendoza y Sandoval.

=== Art collection ===
Following the execution of Charles I of England and the dispersion of his art collection, Luis de Haro commissioned Alonso de Cárdenas, the Spanish ambassador in London, to purchase some of the most valuable works. Cárdenas bought more than a hundred paintings at the auction organised by the Parliament, known as the Commonwealth Sale. Among them were many of the most prized works in the collection, such as the Death of the Virgin by Andrea Mantegna, the Self-Portrait by Albrecht Dürer, La Perla by Raphael, The Virgin and Child between Saint Matthew and an Angel by Andrea del Sarto, The Washing of the Feet by Tintoretto, and Moses Saved from the Waters by Paolo Veronese, all of them currently in the Museo del Prado. The series of the Eleven Caesars by Titian was destroyed in the fire of the Royal Alcázar of Madrid in 1734.

Haro purchased the large Christ and the Centurion by Paolo Veronese from Lady Alethea Talbot Howard, wife of the Earl of Arundel.

== Sources ==
- Evans Crowe, Eyre (1837). Lives of the Most Eminent Foreign Statesmen: Louis de Haro. Cardinal Dubois. Cardinal Alberoni. John William, duke of Ripperda. Vol. 4. London: Longman, Rees, Orme, Brown & Green. pp. 1–63.
- Lynn Williams, ed. (2000). Letters from the Pyrenees. Don Luis Méndez de Haro's correspondence to Philip IV of Spain, July to November 1659. Exeter: University of Exeter Press. ISBN 978-0859896924.
- Stradling, R. A. (2002). Philip IV and the Government of Spain, 1621-1665. Cambridge: Cambridge University Press. ISBN 978-0521530552.
- Bassegoda, Bonaventura (2002). "Los retratos de Don Luis Méndez de Haro". Locus Amoenus. 6: 305–326. doi:10.5565/rev/locus.132.
- Brotton, Jerry (2007). The Sale of the Late King's Goods: Charles I and His Art Collection. London: Pan Macmillan. ISBN 978-0-330-42709-8.
- Valladares Ramírez, Rafael (2014). "El último valido don Luis de Haro". Clío: Revista de historia (154): 48–57. ISSN 1579-3532.
- Valladares, Rafael (2016). El mundo de un valido: Don Luis de Haro y su entorno, 1643-1661. Madrid: Marcial Pons. ISBN 978-8415963943.
- Reinhardt, Nicole (2016). "'Favourites and Confessors'". Voices of Conscience: Royal Confessors and Political Counsel in Seventeenth-Century Spain and France. Oxford: Oxford University Press. pp. 277–309. doi:10.1093/acprof:oso/9780198703686.003.0011. ISBN 978-0-19-870368-6.
- Malcolm, Alistair (2017). Royal Favouritism and the Governing Elite of the Spanish Monarchy, 1640-1665. Oxford: Oxford University Press. ISBN 978-0198791904.
- Mrozek Eliszezynski, Giuseppe (2017). "Ripensare il valimiento: Don Luis de Haro nella più recente storiografia". Storica: Rivista quadrimestrale. 67/68 (A. XXIII): 171–192. doi:10.23744/1707.
- Armando, Gianfranco; Camarma, Alberto (2023). "Two 'Prophets' and One Confessor: Philip IV's Spiritual Stage in 1643–1644". In Stephen M. Hart; Alexander Samson (eds.). Philip IV and the World of Spain's Rey Planeta. Woodbridge, Suffolk: Boydell & Brewer. pp. 114–131. doi:10.1017/9781800108943.006. ISBN 978-1-80010-894-3.

Spanish nobility
Preceded by Diego López de Haro	VI Marquess of Carpio; 1469–1528	Succeeded by Gaspar Méndez de Haro
