= Alonso de Cárdenas (ambassador) =

Spanish diplomat

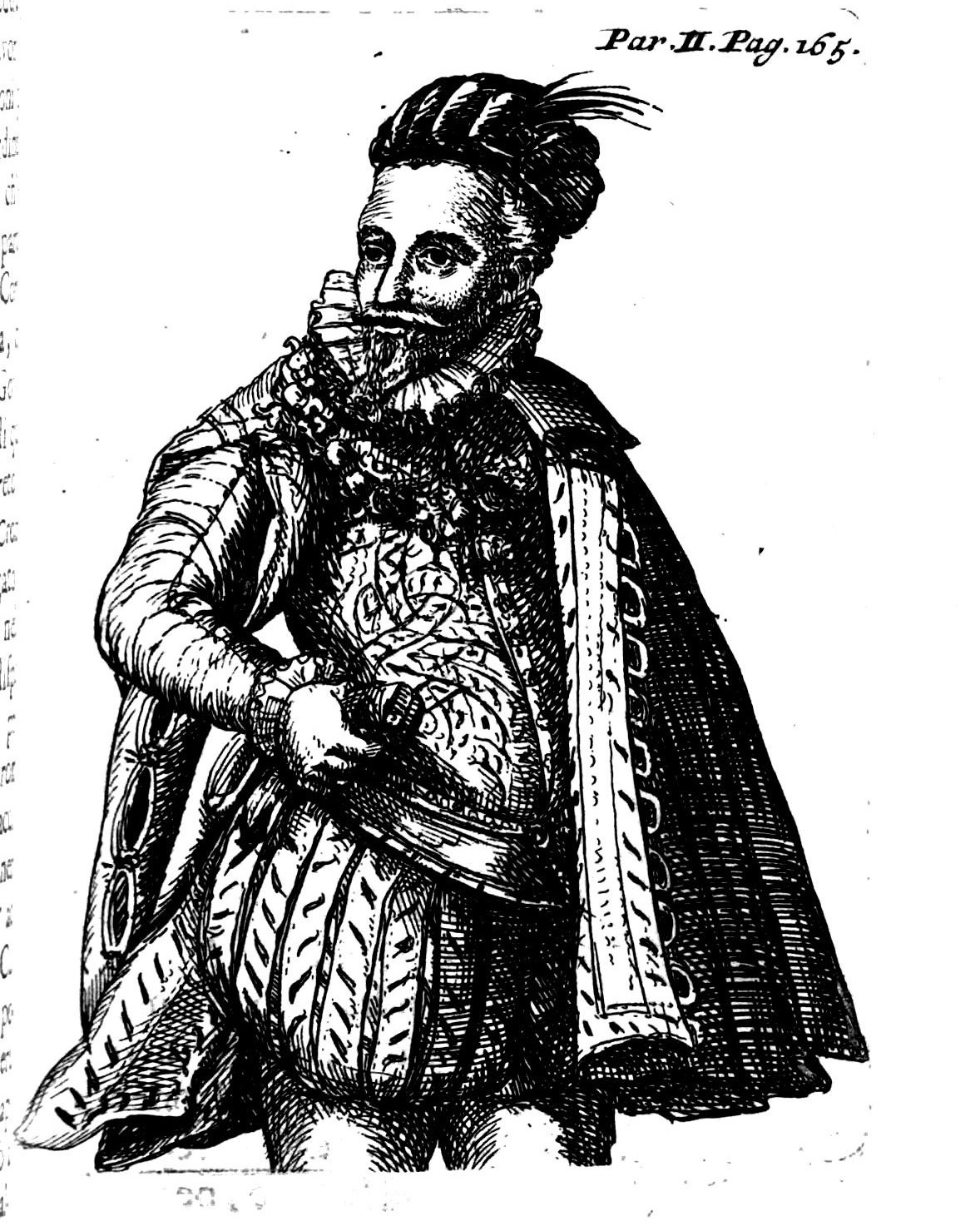
- Alonso de Cárdenas in Historia e memorie recondite sopra alla vita di Oliviero Cromuele by Gregorio Leti, 1692
- Born: c. 1592; Madrid, Kingdom of Spain
- Died: 18 August 1666 (73-74 years of age); Madrid, Kingdom of Spain
- Title: Spanish ambassador to the courts of Charles I and Oliver Cromwell
- Predecessor: Íñigo Vélez de Guevara, 8th Count of Oñate
- Parent(s): Urbán de Peralta; Elvira de Cárdenas y Figueroa

Alonso de Cárdenas, 1st Viscount of Villahermosa de Ambite, knight of Santiago (Madrid, c. 1592 – Madrid, 18 August 1666), was the Spanish ambassador to London between 1638 and 1655, during the English Commonwealth.

== Biography ==
=== Early life ===
Alonso de Cárdenas was the second son of Urbán de Peralta and Elvira de Cárdenas y Figueroa, sister of the Count of La Puebla del Maestre. He used his mother's surname whose family was higher in nobility than his father's. His political career at Court was facilitated thanks to his family's connections. Still young he entered the service of Manuel de Acevedo y Zúñiga, viceroy of Naples (1631-6), becoming regent of the Vicaria and member of the Consejo Colateral of Naples.

=== The embassy to London ===
In 1638, King Philip IV of Spain named him Envoy ad interim, to replace the inexperienced Count of Oñate as Ambassador in London. He would stay in England for the next 17 years. In July 1640 Cárdenas was appointed ordinary ambassador to Charles I. He was soon joined in London by Virgilio Malvezzi, sent as an extraordinary ambassador by Philip IV, and by the marquis of Velada, sent by the governor of the Spanish Netherlands, the Cardinal-Infante Ferdinand of Austria. The purpose behind this triple embassy was to obtain English military support in the war against the French, with whom Spain had been at war since 1635. The diplomatic mission, however, failed and Malvezzi and Velada left London in 1641.

After the end of the Civil War, Cárdenas contemplated an alliance with republican England against France. On 21 December 1650, he was received in solemn audience by Parliament and the following month Spain became the first great power to formally recognise the Commonwealth.

Spain's early diplomatic recognition of the Commonwealth regime can be explained by the need to keep the English Channel open to Spanish ships and to make possible the recruitment of Irish mercenaries willing to fight alongside the Spanish troops in their war with France. The decision was undoubtedly influenced by news of Cromwell's victory over David Leslie at the battle of Dunbar.

Following the execution of Charles I of England, Cárdenas acted for his king and other Spanish collectors in the sales breaking up the art collection of the deceased king. He played a crucial role in the acquisition of several important works of art for Philip IV and his favourite Luis Méndez de Haro in the auction organized in 1649 by the English Parliament of the collections of the king.

During the Protectorate Cárdenas was tasked with negotiating a potential alliance between Spain and the English Republic, but the talks stalled. Oliver Cromwell said Cárdenas that an alliance was possible on the conditions that the English were granted liberty of conscience within the Spanish Empire and that free trade be allowed between England and the Spanish West Indies. Cárdenas rejected Cromwell's demands by declaring that this was asking Philip IV "to give up his two eyes". He was withdrawn from his post following news that English forces had attacked Hispaniola as part of the Western Design, beginning the Anglo-Spanish War. A commercial treaty between England and France was signed on the very day that Cárdenas left England (October 24, 1655).

Cárdenas left Britain convinced that the best hope of fomenting trouble against the Protector was by assisting the Levellers and exploiting discontent in the army rather than by means of a royalist rising. For the Royalists had been crushed by the special taxation and restrictions imposed by Cromwell after the latest rising. Cárdenas therefore furnished Edward Sexby and other Levellers large sums of money to plot against Cromwell. Leading Independents, including the regicides Henry Marten, Thomas and James Chaloner and Thomas Scot, were all on Cárdenas' pay roll.

=== Final years ===
Cárdenas was later the emissary of Philip to Charles II's exiled court in Brussels. In 1656 he signed the Treaty of Brussels on behalf of Spain. It allied Madrid with the exiled British and Irish Royalists against their common enemies the English Commonwealth and France.

Cárdenas returned to Spain in 1660 and worked for the Council of the Indies. He received the title of Viscount of Villahermosa and died in 1666 without issue.

== Works ==
Ángel Alloza; Glyn Redworth, eds. (2011). La Revolución inglesa (1638-1656)/The English Revolution (1638-1656). Madrid: Biblioteca Nueva. ISBN 978-8499401683.

== Bibliography ==
- Aubrey, Philip (1990). Mr Secretary Thurloe: Cromwell's Secretary of State, 1652-1660. London: Athlone Press. ISBN 978-0838633885.
- Hainsworth, Roger (1997). The Swordsmen in Power: War and Politics under the English Republic, 1649-1660. Thrupp, Glos.: Sutton Publishing. ISBN 978-0750905718.
