= Dominici (surname) =

Dominici is an Italian surname. Notable people with the surname include:

- Alice Dominici (born 1975), Italian swimmer
- Arturo Dominici (1918–1992), Italian actor
- Bernardo de' Dominici (1683–1759), Italian art historian and painter
- Caterina Dominici (1829–1894), Italian nun
- Charlie Dominici (1951–2023), American singer
- Christophe Dominici (1972–2020), French rugby union footballer
- Franca Dominici (1907–1999), Italian actress
- Francesca Dominici, Italian statistician
- Francesco Dominici (operatic tenor) (1885–1968), Italian operatic tenor
- Francesco Dominici (painter) (c.1543–1578), Italian painter
- Giovanni Dominici (1356–1420), Italian Cardinal and writer
- Maria de Dominici (1645–1703), Maltese painter, sculptor, and nun
- Martina Dominici (born 2002), Argentine artistic gymnast
- Pedro César Dominici (1873–1954), Venezuelan playwright and writer

== See also ==
- Dominici (disambiguation)
- Eva De Dominici, stage name of Argentinian model and actress Eva Carolina Quattrocci
- Domenici
- De Dominicis
