= Dominici =

Dominici may refer to:

- Dominici (surname)
- Dominici (band), the band fronted by Charlie Dominici
- The Dominici affair, involving the 1952 murder of Jack Drummond and his family
- L'Affaire Dominici (1973 film), a film starring Jean Gabin
- L'Affaire Dominici (2003 film), a film starring Michel Serrault
- Dominici (crater), a crater on Mercury

== See also ==
- Domenici
- De Dominicis
