= Tattoos and Shadows =

Artwork by Jeff Wall

Tattoos and Shadows is a color photograph created by Canadian photographer Jeff Wall in 2000. It was staged and inspired by a classical work of art, like others of his photographs. It is exhibited in a lightbox at the San Francisco Museum of Modern Art.

== History and description ==
The staged photograph was inspired by the painting Luncheon on the Grass (1863), by Édouard Manet. The original painting, who had been inspired itself by the Pastoral Concert (c. 1510), now attributed to Titian, had a nude woman staring at the viewer, at the center of the composition, while she was being addressed by a man, and had another man at her left side. In Wall photograph, the set is changed to a suburban garden, where a large tree stands, with her foliage filtering the light. Three figures appear, of which two are female and one male, but they don't interact with each other, and both women have absent gazes. A man seated at the right in the grass is casually dressed in a shirt and shorts, displaying his arm tattoos, while he reads attentively a book. His sunglasses and a plastic bottle lie nearby in the ground. At the center of the composition, an ethnic Asian girl leans calmly, seemingly relaxed, dressed in a pink shirt and jeans, with one of her hands on her head, touching the tree, while the other hand is between her legs. To her left, a redhead woman is seated on the ground, with her legs crossed, wearing a greenish dress, while also showing her right arm tattoo. Her eyes are lowered and she doesn't look at the viewer. At her front, a small bottle lies on the ground. An empty chair stands at her left and her slippers lie on the ground, left of the chair. The picture does haver a sense of intimacy and at the same time of loneliness, since the relationship between the figures remains unexplained and they seem oblivious to each others presence.
