= Fame Asylum =

Fame Asylum is a 2006 documentary that followed the progress of a boy band made up of four asylum seekers and aired on Channel 4. The Guardian said it was among the worst ideas in TV history, and the programme was also nominated for a Royal Television Society Award.

It is available to watch on 40D, and has some accompanying learning resources.

The artist who initiated the documentary, Richard DeDomenici, has compiled an archive of material responding to the project, and has written an article about it for Refugee Week, who collaborated on the project.
