= Pastoral Concert =

Painting by Titian (c. 1509)

The Pastoral Concert
- Le Concert Champêtre
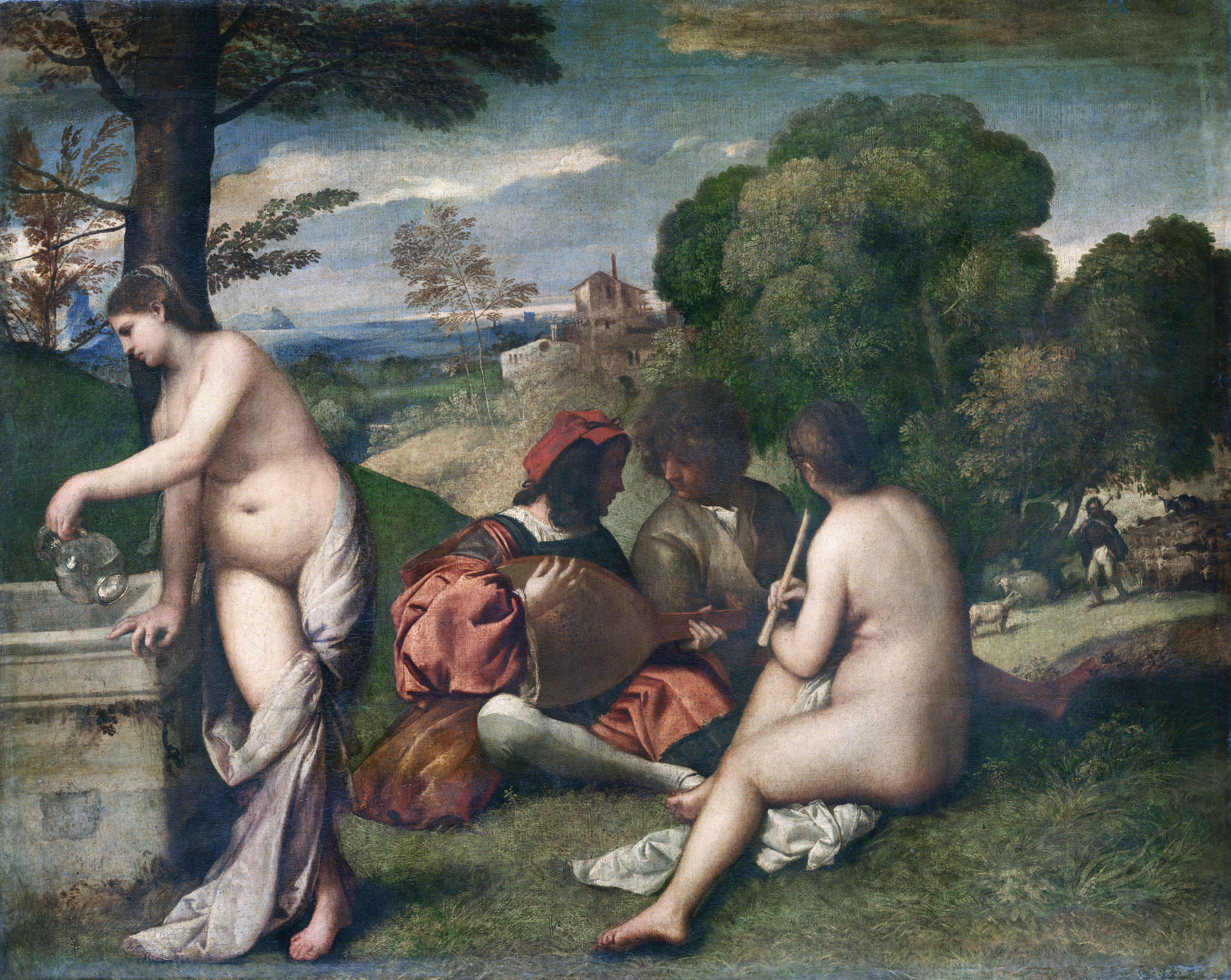
- Artist: Titian (attributed to)
- Year: 1509–1510
- Medium: Oil on Canvas
- Movement: Venetian painting
- Dimensions: 105 x 136.5 cm
- Location: Musée du Louvre, Paris
- Website: Musée du Louvre

The Pastoral Concert or Le Concert Champêtre is an oil painting of c. 1509 attributed to the Italian Renaissance master Titian. It was previously attributed to his fellow Venetian and contemporary Giorgione. It is located in the Musée du Louvre in Paris.

This painting was created between approximately 1509 and 1510; the exact date of its creation is unknown. This period also represents a turbulent period of history in Venice, specifically the League of Cambrai's War in 1509. Art historian Jonathan Unglaub suggests that this painting was painted in response to the war, providing an "idyllic refuge from the ravages of history."

The term "Concert Champêtre" was first used in 1754 by Nicolas Bernard Lépicié, to describe this painting. But when it entered the Louvre in 1792 it was given the title of a Fête champêtre, a genre arguably based on this painting. It is believed to display the Renaissance admiration of classical poetry, an essential value of humanism. This painting is also considered the origin of a genre of Pastoral paintings, because of its connection to pastoral poetry, as seen by the young men gathering in the Italian countryside's lush, picturesque greenery. The pastoral concert or Fête Champêtre genre is described as a gathering in a picturesque landscape. Usually, young men are gathered together in a creative pursuit, seated on the landscape's grass. The paintings themselves are almost always allegories or depictions of mythological characters. This is the 16th-century genre; in the French-led 18th-century type, women are very prominent.

This painting is an example of the Venetian school of Italian Renaissance art. Paintings from Venice are characterized as having rich color schemes that create a "warm glow" and emphasize naturalism above all else. Venetian paintings also have a specialty in mythological and allegorical themes. The unique use of color is known as colorito, and it was most often found in Venetian painting.

The patronage of this painting remains unknown. Isabella d'Este is a possible candidate for patron due to a so-called bagno scene she commissioned for her brother Alfonso I d'Este, Duke of Ferrara. Still, the word bagno is considered to describe a painting by Palma Vecchio, another Venetian painter active during the same period.

== Description ==
The painting portrays three young people on a lawn, playing music together. Next to them, a standing woman is pouring water from a marble basin. The women are naked apart from their drapery, fallen to their legs; the two men are dressed in contemporary 16th century Venetian costume. In a vast, pastoral background, there is a shepherd and a landscape.

As is usual with early Venetian paintings, there are no drawings that are clearly associated with this painting, but some figure drawings may have been used as sources for individual figures. These probably come from the circle of Giorgione, as does the painter.

=== Interpretation ===
It has been suggested that the painting may be a commentary on the paragone, the scholarly debate during the Renaissance that tried to determine either painting or sculpture as the superior art form. Venice was one of the artistic epicenters of the paragone between the concepts disegno and colorito, with the latter being a hallmark of Venetian Art. It is proposed that this painting could be an artistic argument, showing how painting and the techniques of colorito are superior to disegno, which was common to Florentine art. Some of the most well known colorito artists from the Venetian Renaissance include Giorgione, Titian, Giovanni Bellini, and Jacopo Bellini.

=== Location ===
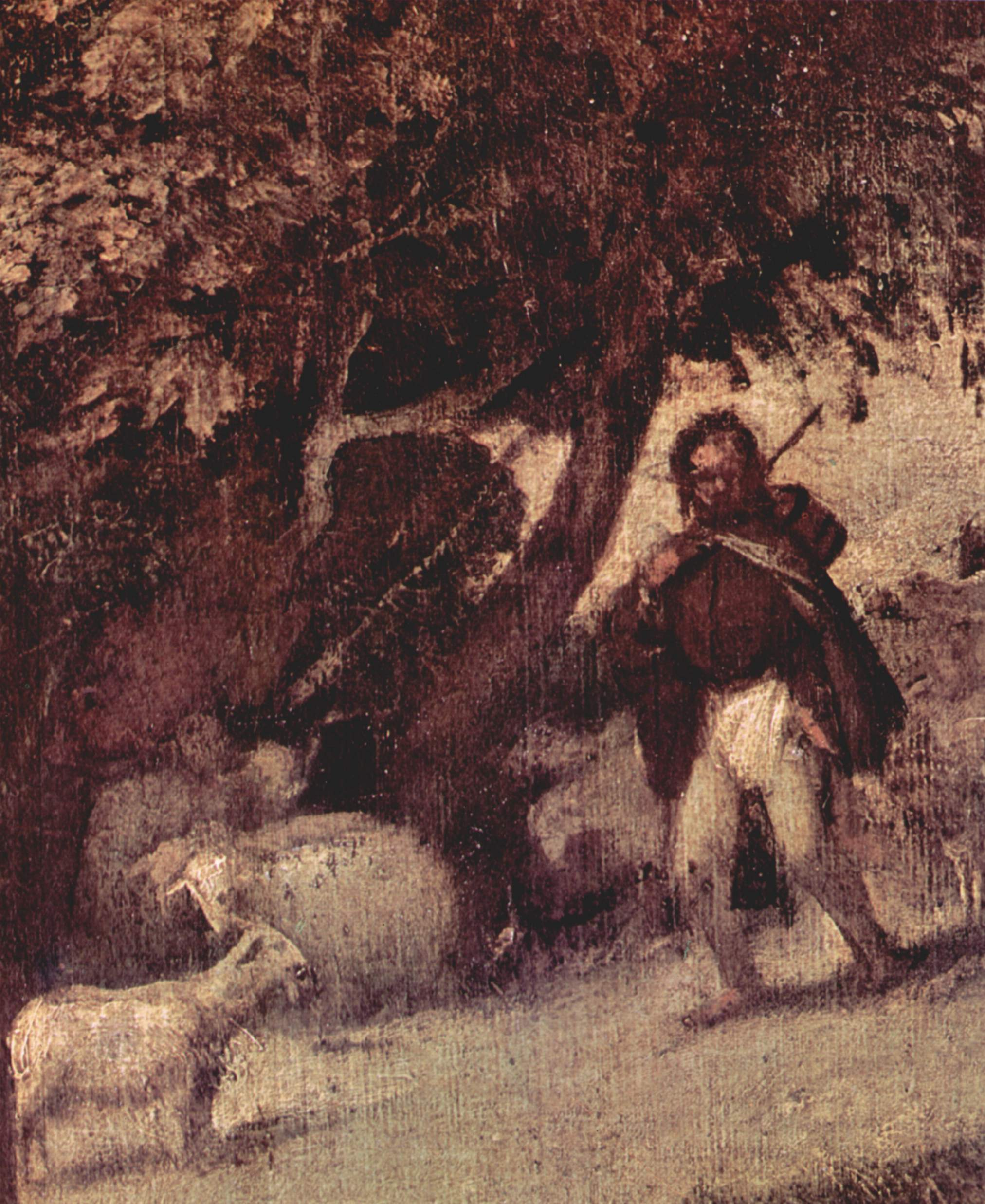
Shepard (Detail), Pastoral Concert, 1509, Musée de Louvre

The painting is understood to be a pastoral landscape in the Italian countryside. It is not explicitly stated or described by historical documents exactly where this painting is set. Still, as it comes from Venice, there is a high possibility in the Venetian countryside. Venetian painting's major specialty is landscape paintings, specifically idyllic landscapes such as Locus amoenus that posit subjects into the Venetian Countryside. This painting shows a meadow with a landscape that has broad slopes down to a water source. Intermixed with this idyllic landscape with buildings that match the typical town/villa style of the 16th century Venice city-state.

Christiane Joost-Gaugier suggests that the painting's landscape was a fictional setting inspired by Virgil's Eclogues, specifically numbers three and eight. The painting's landscape details suggest this particular epilogue because the Shepard's appearance with bagpipes alludes to a possible scene depicting a singing contest of Theocritus from one of Horace's Odes or Virgil's Eclogues (3,7).

=== Classical references ===
The subject was perhaps an allegory of poetry and music; the two women could be an imaginary apparition representing ideal beauty, stemming from the two men's fantasy and inspiration. The woman with the glass vase would be the muse of tragic poetry, while the other would be pastoral poetry. Of the two playing men, the one with the lute would represent the exalted lyric poetry, the other being an ordinary lyricist, according to Aristotle's distinction in his Poetics. Another interpretation suggests that the painting evokes the natural world's four elements (water, fire, earth, and air) and their harmonic relationship.

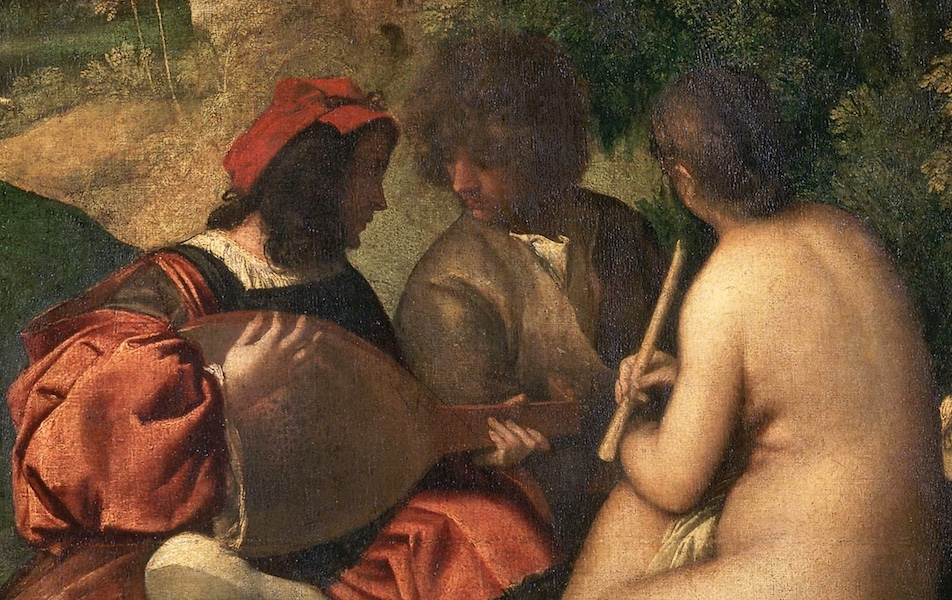
Seated Figures (Detail), Pastoral Concert, 1509, Musée de Louvre

Another theory is that this painting's subject is an allegorical interpretation of Theocritus's poem about Daphnis, a shepherd thought to be the pastoral poetry founder. Philipp Fehl references this poem in his theory on the identity of the women in the paintings. Theocritus describes Arcadia as the land that the Greek god Pan originates. Arcadia was imagined as a "paradise" by Jacopo Sannazaro in his 15th-century pastoral poem Arcadia, popular around Venice and the surrounding city-states. It is suggested that the nymphs create Arcadia around them, making Arcadia a spiritual state of existence that one establishes. Philipp Fehl also proposes that this painting symbolizes Ludovico Ariosto's Orlando Furioso, an extremely popular epic poem in the early 16th century. One of Ariosto's most famous patrons was Ippolito d'Este and his older sister, Isabella d'Este, the possible patron of this painting.

Julia Marianne Koos's theory suggests that the painting is an allegory for the discourse of love. In the Italian Renaissance, it was believed that nature was a "mirror of the lover's soul and an idyllic place of refuge". This specific painting's allegory on love's discourse was believed to be originating from Pietro Bembo's poetic musing on desire, such as his poem The Asolani. The concept of "desire" depicted in art was a heated debate in the 16th century, as seen in writings such as Leonardo da Vinci's Trattato della pittura.

Art Historian Ross Kilpatrick suggests that two ancient literature texts, Horace's Epistles and Propertius's Elegy, were the significant pieces of inspiration behind this painting.

== Identity of figures ==
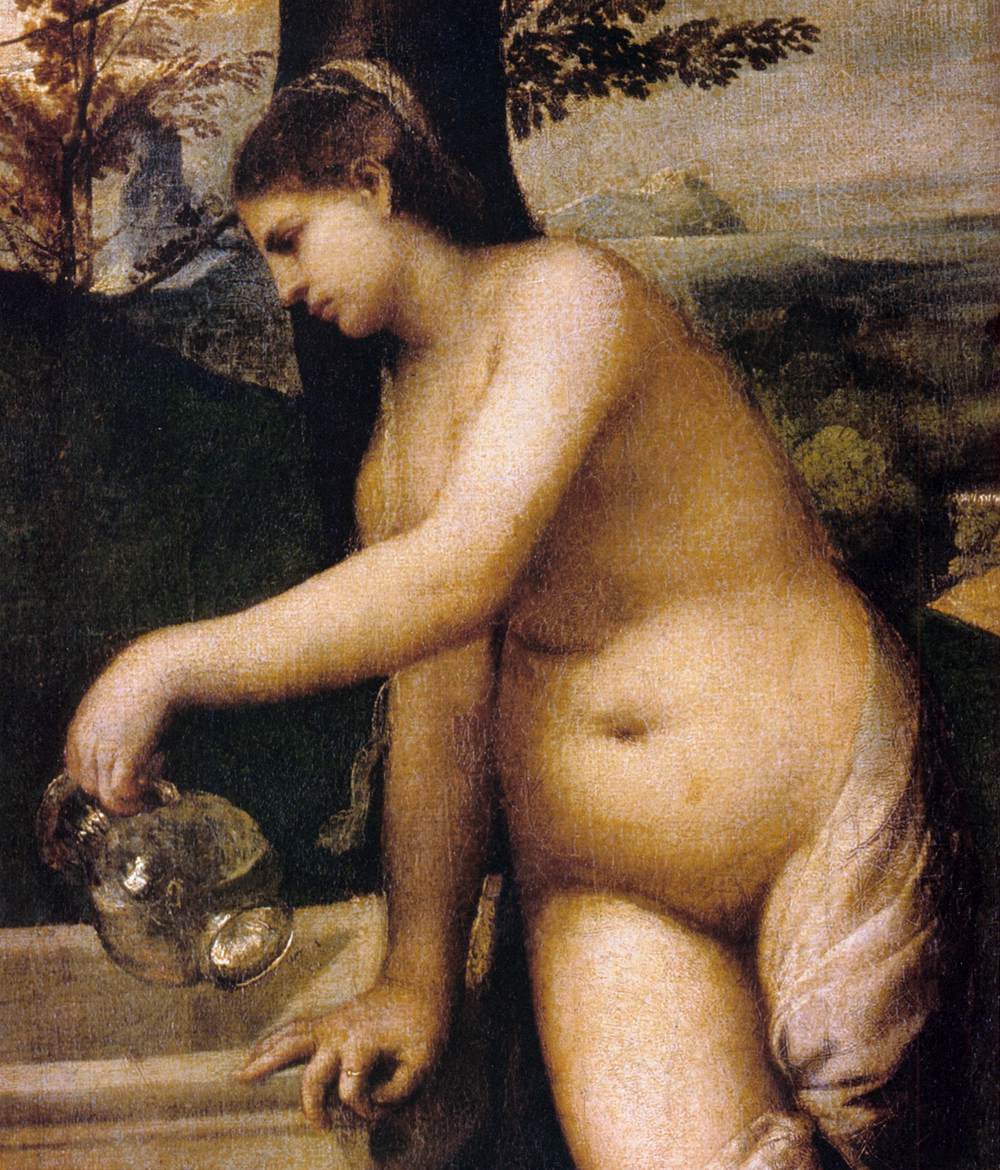
Unidentified woman (left) in Pastoral Concert, 1509, Musée de Louvre

A leading theory on the women's identities in the painting was put forth by Phillipp Fehl in 1957, postulating that the women are Nymphs, minor ancient Greek goddesses, and not human. He stipulates that the nymphs have been lured out of the woods toward the music being created by the men in the pastoral. Fehl also maintains that these nymph women are invisible to the men in the painting but are visible to us, the viewer. Also according to Fehl, the closest poetic work that matches this painting is William Shakespeare's A Midsummer Night's Dream (obviously, entirely unknown to Titian, as it was written much later) . He uses this passage from A Midsummer Night's Dream to support his theory of the nymphs being invisible to human eyes:

"But who comes here? I am invisible, And I will overhear their conference."

The use of nymphs from Ancient Greek mythology is common for Italian Renaissance paintings due to the deep appreciation for the antiquity of Greek and Rome, a common aspect of Renaissance Humanism.

Holberton agrees they are nymphs from the woods enticed by the beauty of the music, but thinks they are visible to the men.

Elhanian Motzkin identifies the nude female figure on the left as Inspiration and the right to be Euterpe, the Greek muse of music. In addition to identifying the female figures, Motzkin also put forth the identity of the men. Building off of the original theories of Phillipp Fehl, Motzkin identifies the men as Apollo and Paris, with Apollo teaching Paris how to play the lute. He also posits that the formerly unidentified herdsman in the far right background is Paris' adoptive father. The latter raised him after being abandoned by his parents Priam and Hecuba.

There are multiple uncertain issues in this painting, the most prominent being the female figure's inclusion on the left pouring water out of a clear jug into a well. Ross Kilpatrick theorized that while the identity of the woman on the left is unknown, the artist's inspiration may derive from Horace's Epistles, which places Horace in the Bandusian Spring's basin, a mystical body of water that also shows up in Propertius's work. The concept of a "mystical spring" presents itself in Epistles, referencing the Greek Muse Calliope. The town of the Sabine Villa included in Horace's Epistles 2.2 has a freshwater spring from which Calliope gathers water. In Horace's poem, the town itself has a fountain with the inscription: "Bandusian Spring, more gleaming than glass." Kirkpatrick suggests that this could be the inspiration for the inclusion of the figure pouring water.

== Attribution ==
The attribution of this painting has long been the subject of debate. The artist was formerly believed to have been Giorgione. Later painting analysis suggested Titian, initially a follower of Giorgione, was its creator. There is no documentation demonstrating attribution. Christiane Joost Gaugier suggested Giorgione began the painting, but he died in 1511 before finishing the painting. He believes that Titian, Giorgione's protégé, completed the painting in honor of his departed mentor. Gaugier states that the lutenist in red on the left symbolizes a youthful Giorgione who is in the midst of teaching the rustic man the lute, a man understood to be a young Titian. Gaugier understands this painting as an allegory for the mentor – protégé relationship the two artists shared.

The painting has also been attributed to Palma the Elder, Sebastiano del Piombo, Domenico Mancini, and Giovanni Bellini. These theories, however, are not as common as the attribution to Titian or Giorgione due to a lack of historical evidence and restoration efforts. The theory of attribution to Domenico Mancini has gained ground as contextual evidence and historical documents have been analyzed.

=== Giorgione ===
Pastoral Concert was attributed to Giorgione until the 20th century, mostly because Giorgione himself was included in Giorgio Vasari's Lives of the Most Excellent Painters, Sculptors, and Architects. While not explicitly named in the book, this passage is inferred: "a musician who played the lute for musicians and continually enjoyed the pleasures of love." This passage refers to the artist because the description matched so closely to the subject of this painting. A work known to have been painted by Giorgione, The Tempest, is referenced in Pastoral Concert through the use of colored hosiery worn by the male subjects, a symbol of Compagnie della Calza, an elite patrician order of young men.

=== Titian ===
The painting was initially attributed to Giorgione, but modern critics assign as more likely a work of the younger Titian. The figures' robustness is considered more typical of his style. Titian's painting The Andrians is used by Phillip Fehl to show the use of symbolic detail by Titian to credit this painting to Titian. Alfonso, I d'Este, Duke of Ferrara, commissioned The Andrians, Isabella d'Este brother. Titian's connection to the House of Este family's patronage is seen as evidence of Titian being the creator of this painting.

The painting itself fits closer to Titian's artistic style because of the artist's use of symbolic minute detail and Rubenesque bodies in the genre of Venetian painting.

=== Domenico Mancini ===
A theory postulated by Charles Hope, and endorsed by Holberton, suggests that the author of the painting is Domenico Mancini, a contemporary painter and follower of Giorgione and Titian. Mancini's Lendinara Cathedral altarpiece is stylistically similar to Pastoral Concert, as well as his Madonna with Saints Francis and Roch. The latter painting is dated 1511, very close to the timeline of completion for this painting. As Hope observed, Pastoral Concert itself has not been cleaned. It is impossible to tell if the painting could be Mancini's without proper restoration. As an artist, Mancini was known to borrow elements and mimic the style of certain Italian Masters. His painting Madonna with Saints Francis and Roch takes significant cues from Giovanni Bellini's San Zaccaria Altarpiece.

== Provenance ==
The painting does not seem to have been well-known until the 18th century. The Gonzaga family, the lords of Mantua, an Italian city-state, owned the work. The painting was later sold to Charles I of England in about 1627, possibly acquired through Henry Fitzalan, 12th Earl of Arundel, a close friend and courtier in Charles I's court. When the English royal collections were dispersed following the revolution of 1649, the painting was sold at auction by the Commonwealth of England to the German banker and art collector, Eberhard Jabach. He, in turn, sold it to Jean-Baptiste Colbert on behalf of Louis XIV in 1671. The painting was later owned in 1736 to Madame de Montespan's son, Duc d' Antin and his collection at the Palace of Versailles. After 1792, the painting was transferred from the French royal art collection to the Louvre Museum during the French Revolution. It remains in their collection to this day.

Copies of this painting were widely available, mostly in Holland, and reproductions frequently were found in the Dutch Art Market in Amsterdam.

== Cultural influence ==
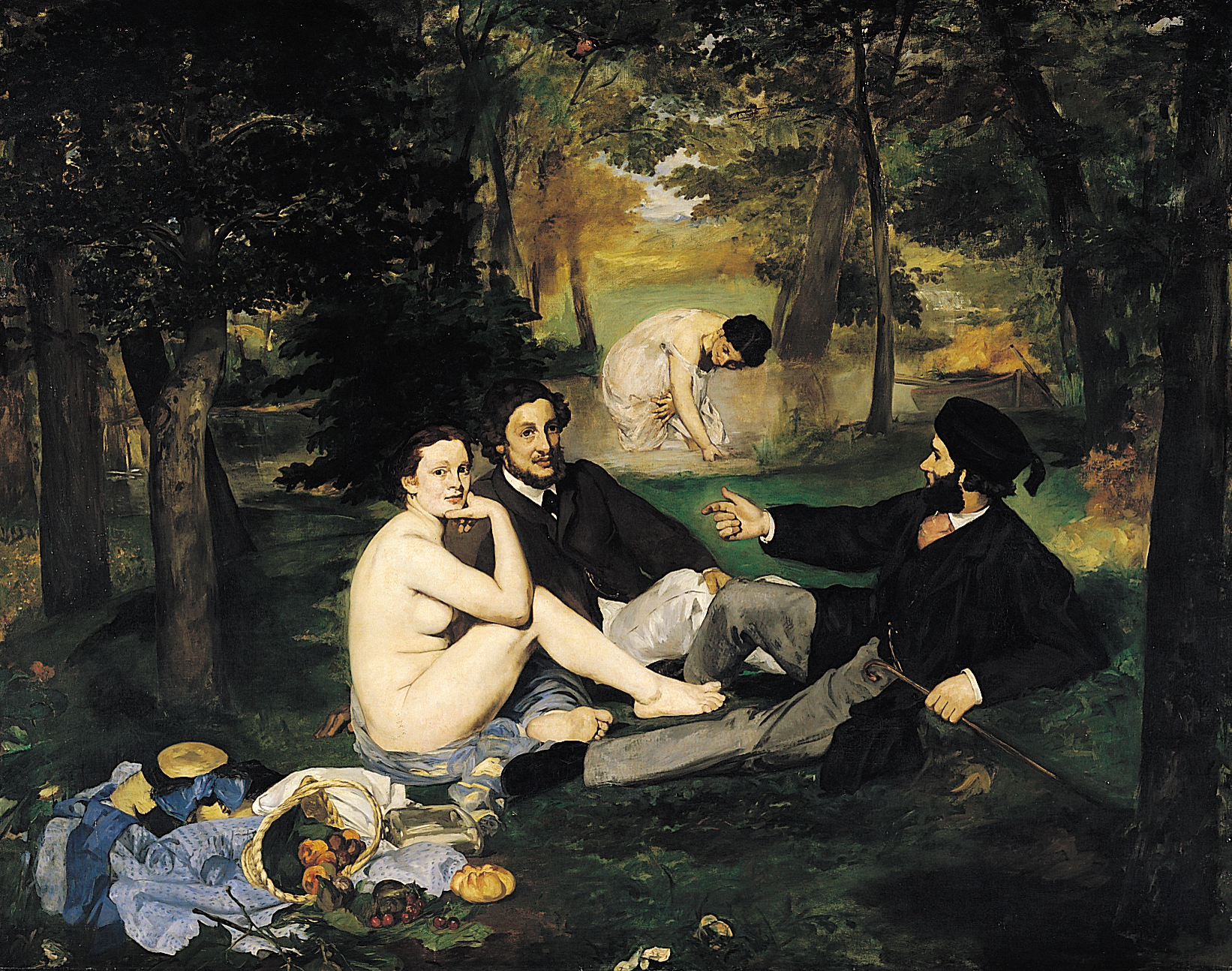
Le Déjeuner sur l'herbe, Édouard Manet, 1862–1863

The Dutch artist Jan de Bisschop copied Pastoral Concert for an engraving as part of his traditional practice copying the Italian Renaissance masters' art. Eugène Delacroix was also said to have made a copy of this painting after witnessing it in the Louvre in 1824. The copy has been lost, but the Venetian work is rumored to have been one of the inspirations for his painting, Women of Algiers. Some other artists' rumored to have copied Pastoral Concert include Edgar Degas and Henri Fantin-Latour. Édouard Manet conceived his Le déjeuner sur l'herbe after viewing the earlier work in the Louvre.

Dante Gabriel Rossetti wrote a poem titled A Venetian Pastoral, by Giorgione, in the Louvre, which was explicitly written about this painting. His poetry was created to move the reader triangularly through the canvas, hopping from subject to subject. This specific sonnet was included in his Poems in 1870.

The three seated figures in the painting were cut and pasted into the sleeve of the 1983 Electric Light Orchestra album Secret Messages.

== See also ==
- List of works by Titian
- 100 Great Paintings, 1980 BBC series
