= Francesco Dominici =

Francesco Dominici can refer to

- Francesco Dominici (operatic tenor), 20th century Cuban-Italian tenor
- Francesco Dominici (painter), 15th-century Italian painter
