= Studiolo of Isabella d'Este =

Private study of Isabella d'Este

The Studiolo of Isabella d'Este was a special private study, first in castello di San Giorgio, later the Studiolo was moved to the Corte Vecchi apartments in the Ducal Palace in Mantua, designed by, and with a collection of art specially commissioned by Isabella d'Este.

== History ==
=== Beginnings ===
Born in Ferrara and educated by some of the most notable humanists of the era, the sixteen-year-old Isabella arrived in Mantua on 12 February 1490 to marry Francesco II Gonzaga. She was given apartments on the main floor of the castello di San Giorgio, close to the Camera degli Sposi. Shortly after her arrival she selected two rooms in these apartments for private use. Badly-lit and with no fireplaces, these two rooms were in the San Niccolò tower - the upper one became her "studiolo" and beneath it her barrel-vaulted "grotta", accessed via a staircase and doorway decorated in marble. She was probably inspired by the Studiolo of the Palazzo Belfiore, designed for her uncle Leonello d'Este, and those in Urbino and Gubbio, both of which she could have got to know via her sister-in-law and close friend Elisabetta Gonzaga, wife of Guidobaldo da Montefeltro.

Isabella used the studiolo for leisure pursuits, writing, study and correspondence as well as for displaying the highlights of her collections, initially only archaeological items but latter moving to contrast modern artworks with ancient ones. She loved music, poetry and art and was nicknamed the "tenth Muse". There were also several images of the muses in Mantegna's paintings for the studiolo and on the doorway into the grotta, which contained her antiquities. From 1492 she commissioned a series of allegorical, mythological and literary paintings for the studiolo from the most notable painters of the era, along with others praising the Este and Gonzaga families. She began in 1497 with Mantegna's 1497 Parnassus, followed in 1499-1502 by his Triumph of the Virtues. He also painted two trompe-l'œil bronze reliefs for the scheme, recorded in 1542 but now lost.

Next came works by other artists such as Perugino's The Battle Between Love and Chastity (a literary subject) and Lorenzo Costa's Allegory of Isabella d'Este's Coronation and Reign of Comus. Comus was produced from an incomplete drawing left by Mantegna, who had died in 1506. Suggestions for the subjects came from her advisors, especially Paride da Ceresara. Her plan was to make the painters compete on identically-sized canvases, all with the same light source of the room's natural light and with foreground figures of the same size. Much correspondence between Isabella and Perugino survives, showing the difficult working process. He produced his work in Florence, but Isabella dictated its every detail via a drawing and even in the contract commissioning the work. Perugino was allowed to omit minor details but was absolutely banned from adding figures of his own invention or changing the brief. She continually sent her agents to check on his progress and when Perugino include a nude Venus rather than the clothed one she had specified in the brief, they reported back to her and she protested to the artist. Even when the painting was delivered in 1505, she said she would rather have had it done in oils, despite having specified tempera in the brief to match with Mantegna's style. The payment for Perugino's painting was only 100 ducats.

== Paintings for the Studiolo ==
Parnassus (1497) by Andrea Mantegna.

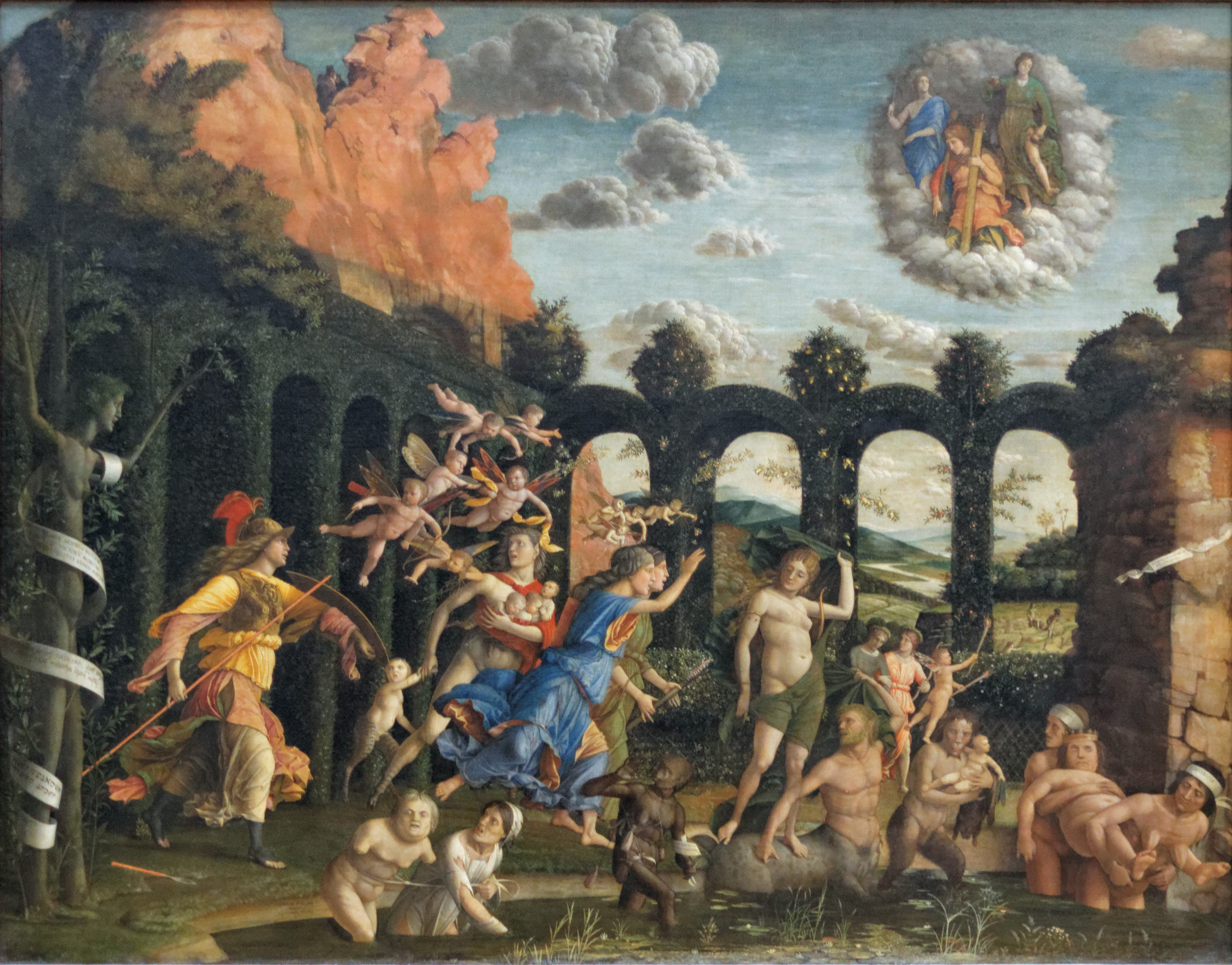
Triumph of the Virtues (1499-1502) by Andrea Mantegna.

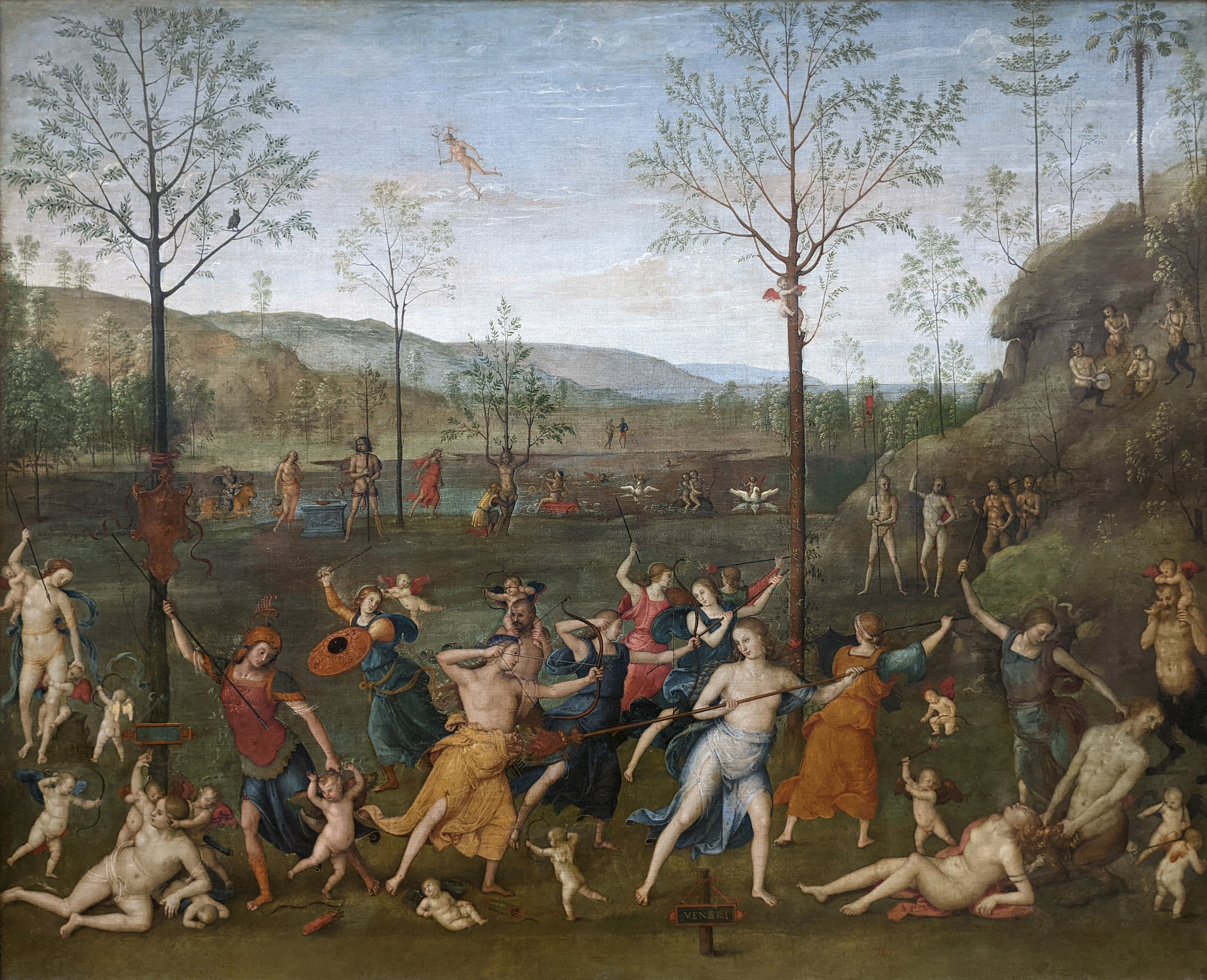
Combat of Love and Chastity (1503) by Perugino.

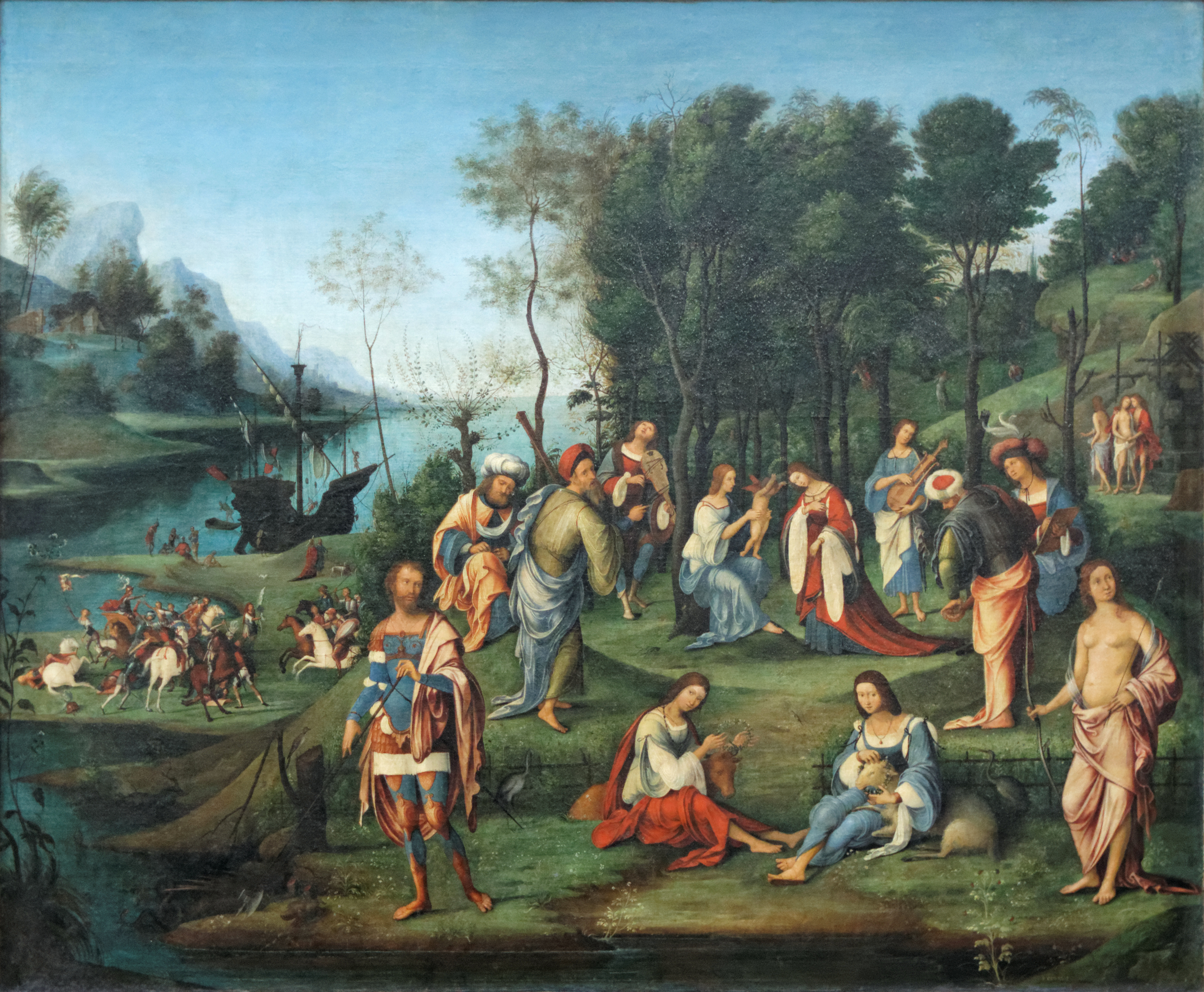
Allegory of Isabella d'Este's Coronation (1505-1506) by Lorenzo Costa.

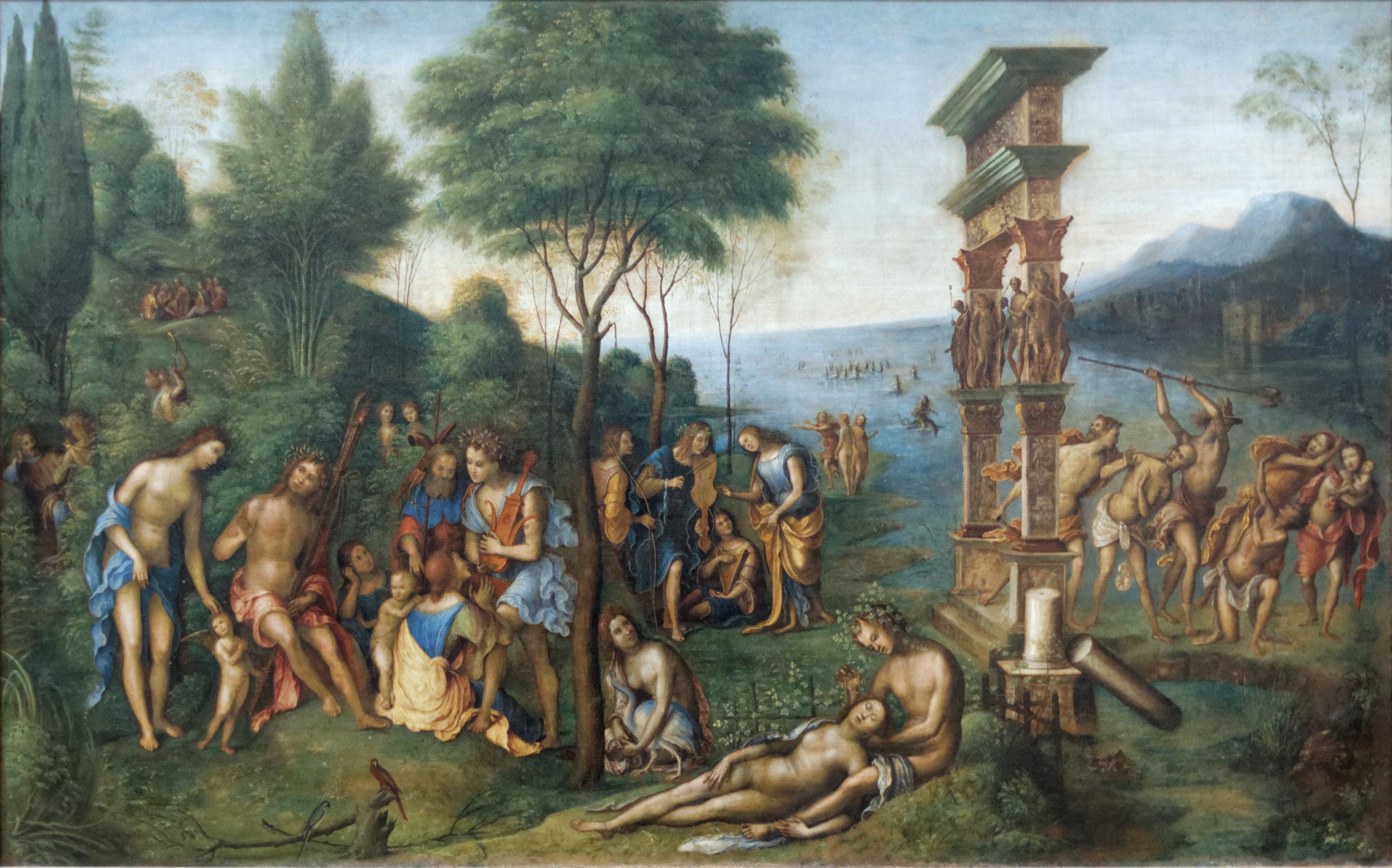
The Reign of Comus (1506-1511) by Lorenzo Costa.

Many of the artists were working in other cities and sending their work to Mantua and so the different systems of measurement across the Italian city states made it difficult to make this plan work. At least once Isabella wrongly stated the light direction to the artists working for her and she often sent changed her mind about the subjects and compositions. Not all the artists were familiar with the mythological and allegorical themes she commissioned and many were put off by the work being shown alongside that of Mantegna, who began the series of paintings - for example, Giovanni Bellini was asked to produce a work and left free to choose his own subject, but he eventually declined the commission as he was not used to working to such a detailed brief. Isabella also tried and failed to commission paintings from Giorgione (who died too soon to accept her offer) and Leonardo da Vinci (despite repeated requests). Botticelli was available but on the advice of Gian Cristoforo Romano and Lorenzo da Pavia Isabella refused him in favour of Perugino.

The two rooms became a must-see for dignitaries visiting the city, although many of the objects shown there were small and at risk of theft - after Charles III of Bourbon-Montpensier's entourage visited in 1509 it was found that some of the silverware had gone missing.

=== Second phase ===
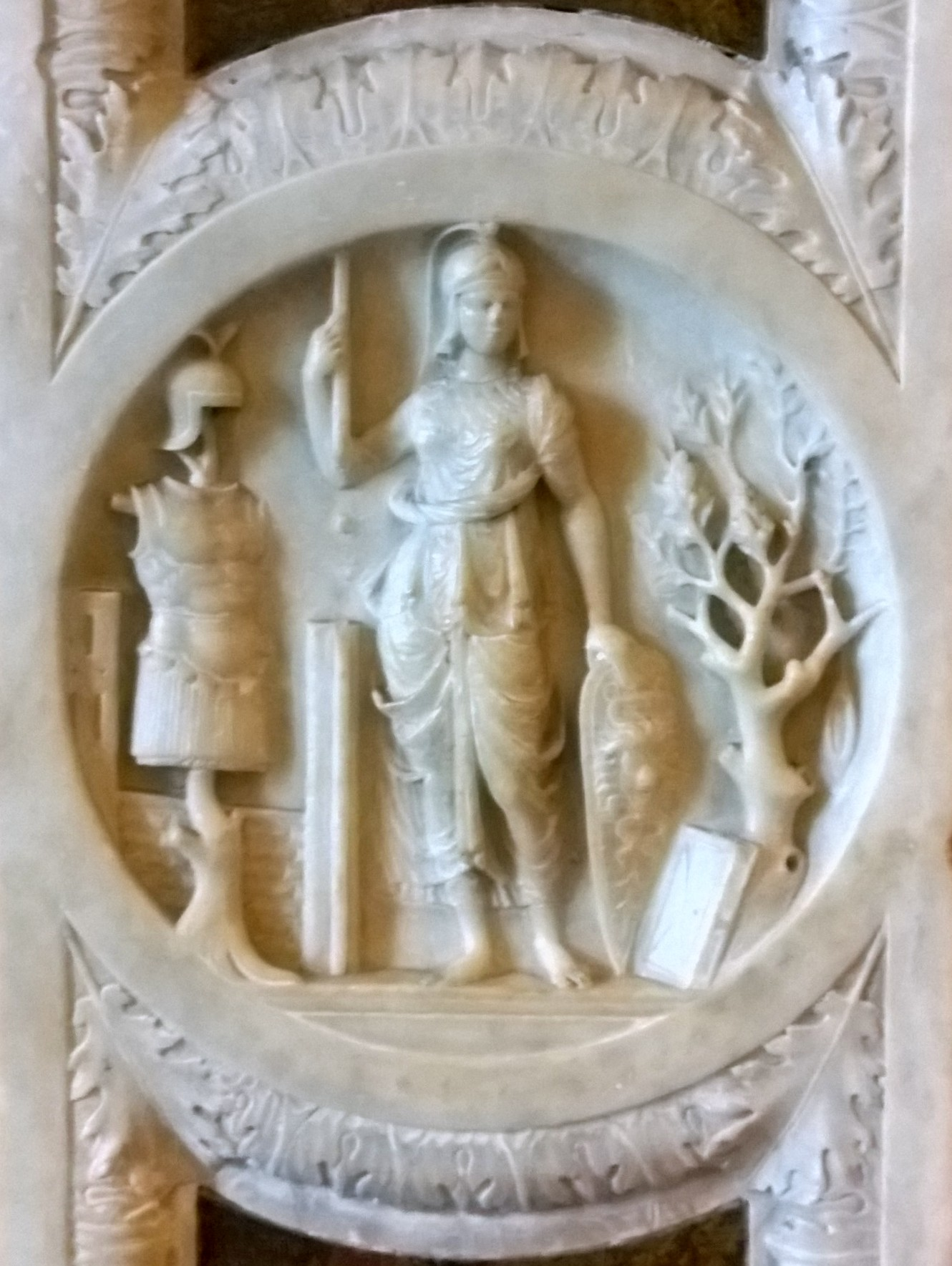
Minerva, Giovanni Cristoforo Romano, detail from the studiolo of Isabella d'Este.

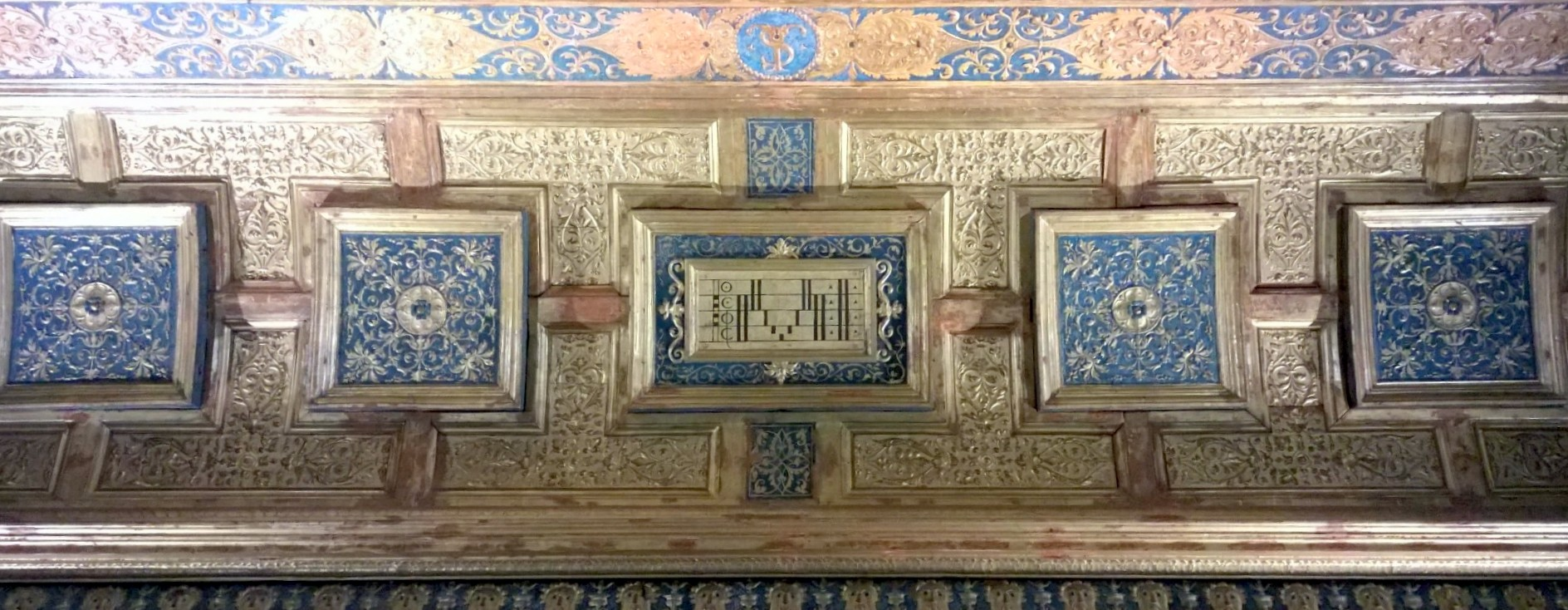
Pentagram on the ceiling of the studiolo.

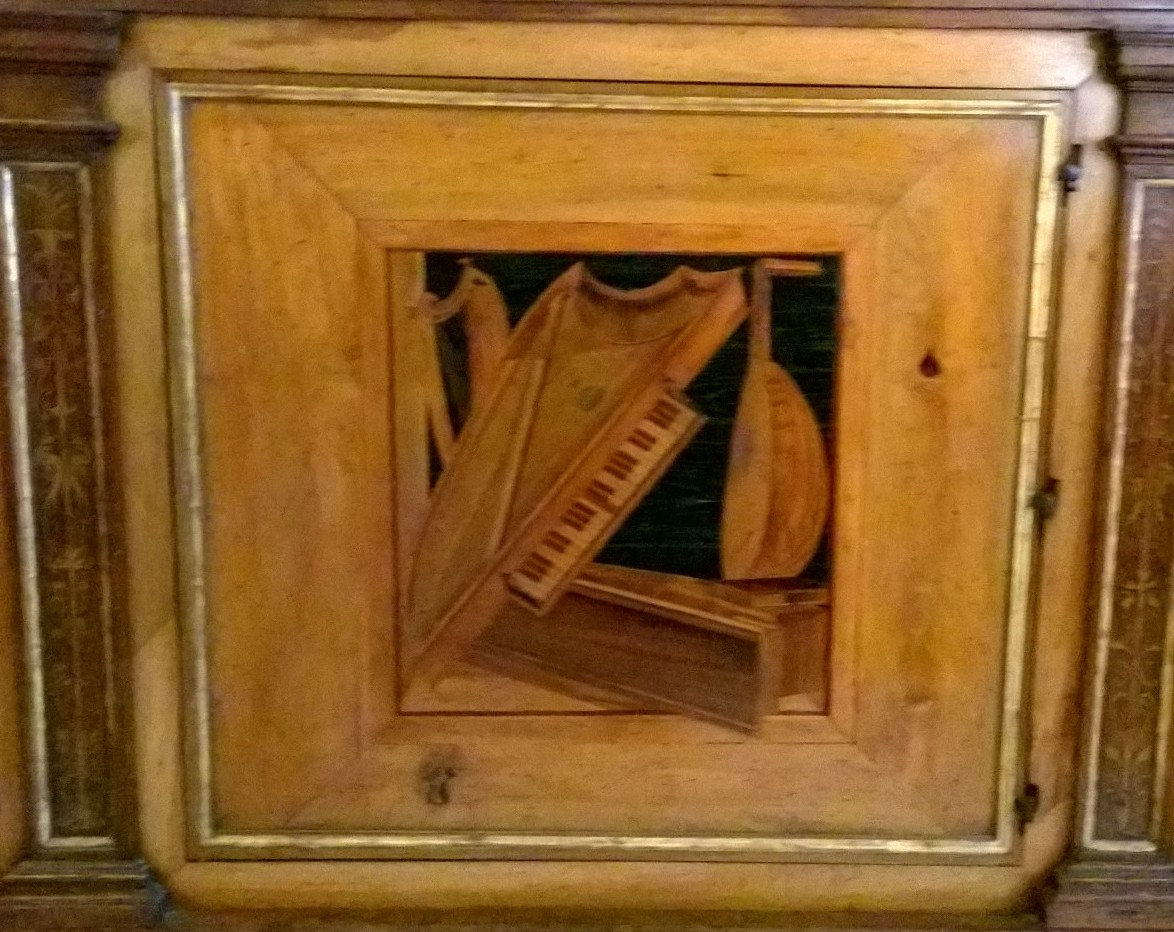
Detail of the Studiolo of Isabella d'Este.

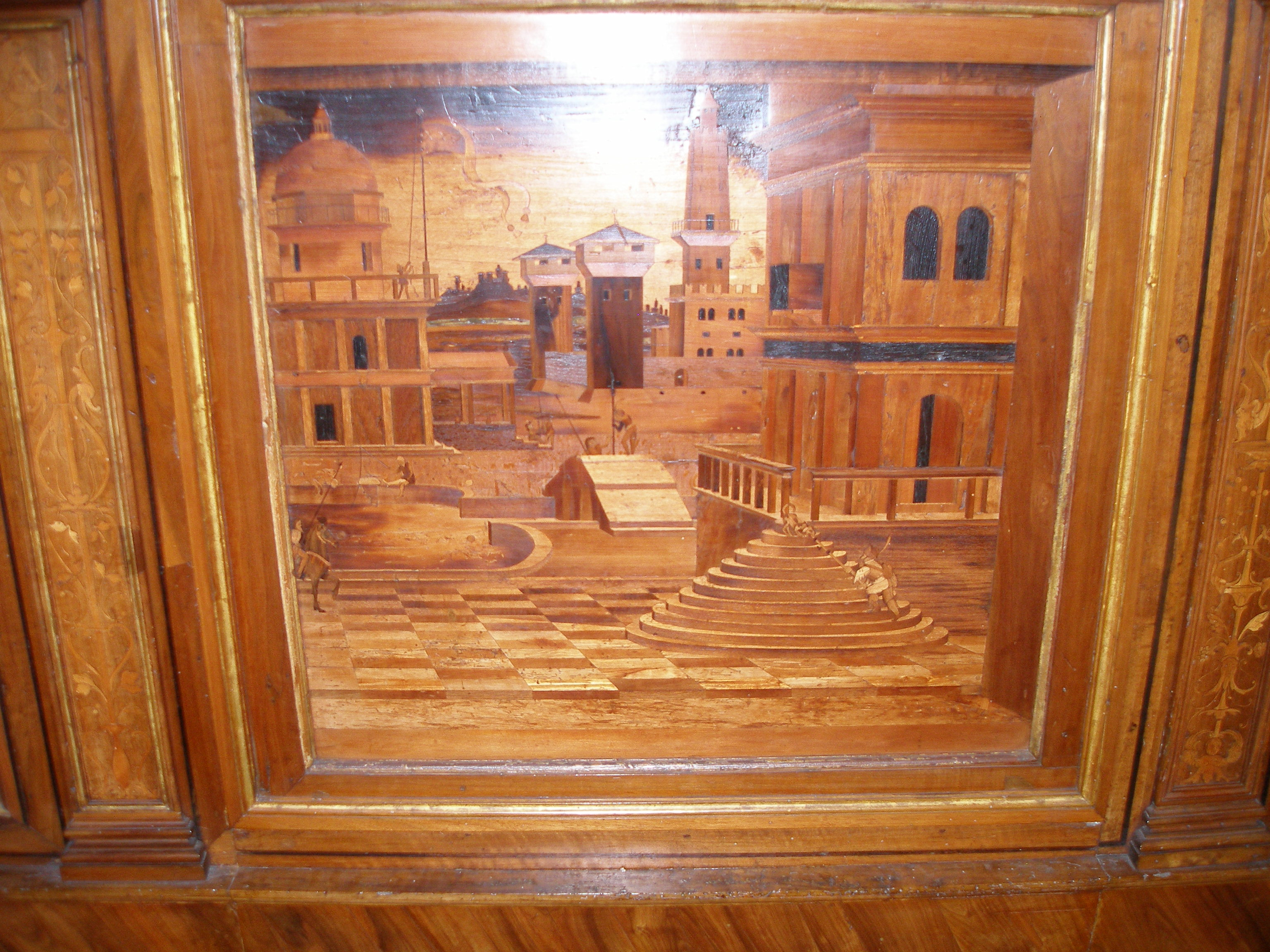
Modern replica of a wooden inlay panel by Antonio della Mola for the Appartamento della Grotta.

Between 1519 and 1522, after her husband's death, Isabella moved into new rooms on the ground floor of the so-called "Corte Vecchia", built by the ducal architect and "Prefect of the Gonzaga Buildings" Battista Covo. She dismantled the studiolo and moved it to these new rooms, which also included a "Nuova Grotta" or 'new Grotto', directly linked to the new studiolo. The rooms also included a 'secret garden', completed in 1522 and decorated with Ionic columns. The studiolo was paved with polychrome tiles from the workshop of Antonio Fedeli of Pesaro, originally bought by Francesco II Gonzaga for his residence at Marmirolo - once he had used those he needed, he sold the surplus to his wife to help her keep down the mice in her apartments.

She had the sculptor Tullio Lombardo create her a new marble doorway from the studiolo to the grotto between 1522 and 1524. She also commissioned a new doorway for the entrance to the Studiolo from Gian Cristoforo Romano, with four bas reliefs, tondoes and multicoloured marble. The grotto itself contained wood-inlay panels from the earlier studiolo, produced in 1506 by Paolo and Antonio della Mola. In 1531 she added Allegory of Virtue and Allegory of Vice, both by Correggio, to the paintings in her studiolo. A 1542 inventory survives, giving some idea of how the paintings and objects were finally displayed on principals of harmony and symmetry but in a very high-density arrangement.

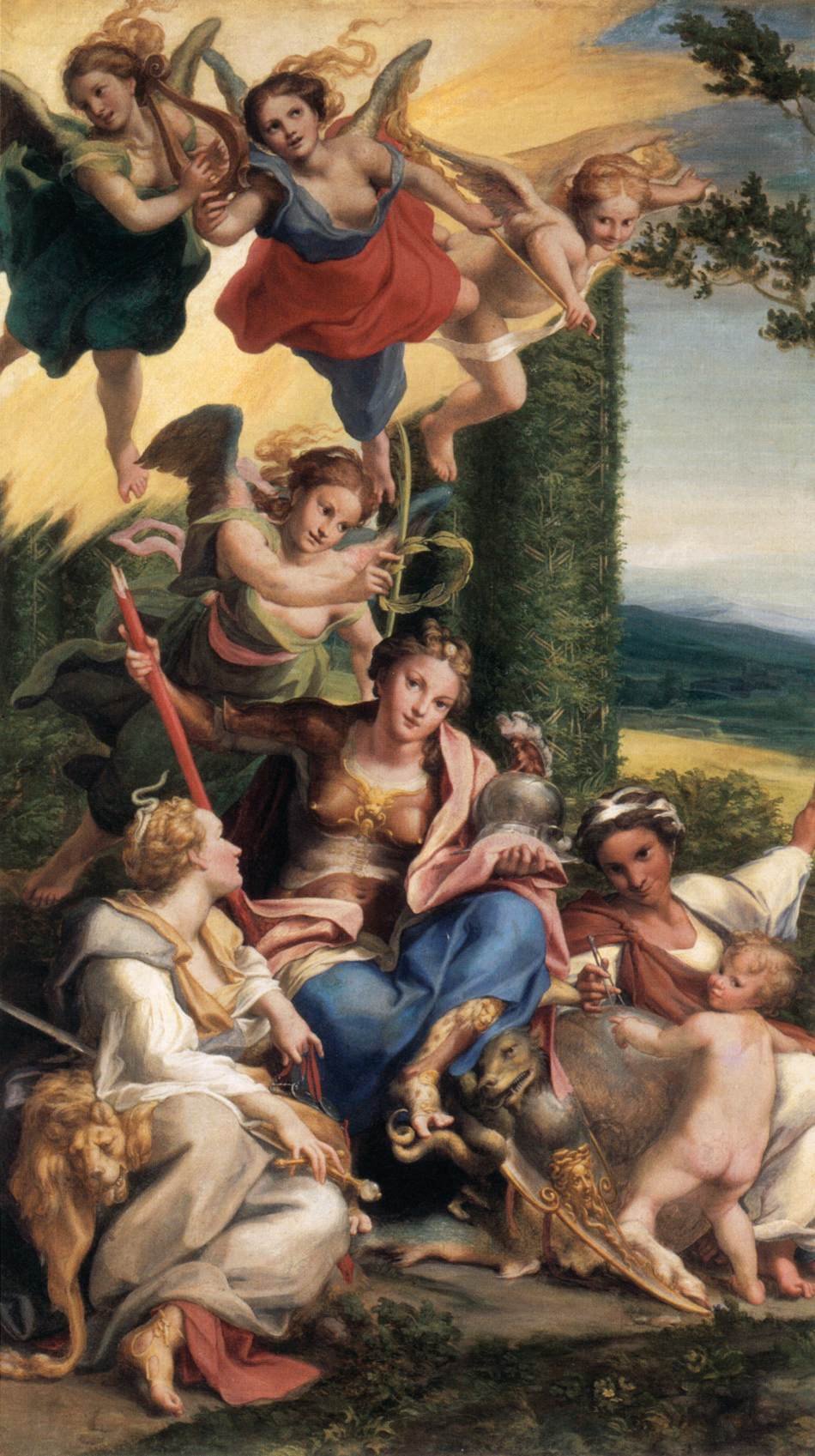
"Allegory of Virtues"

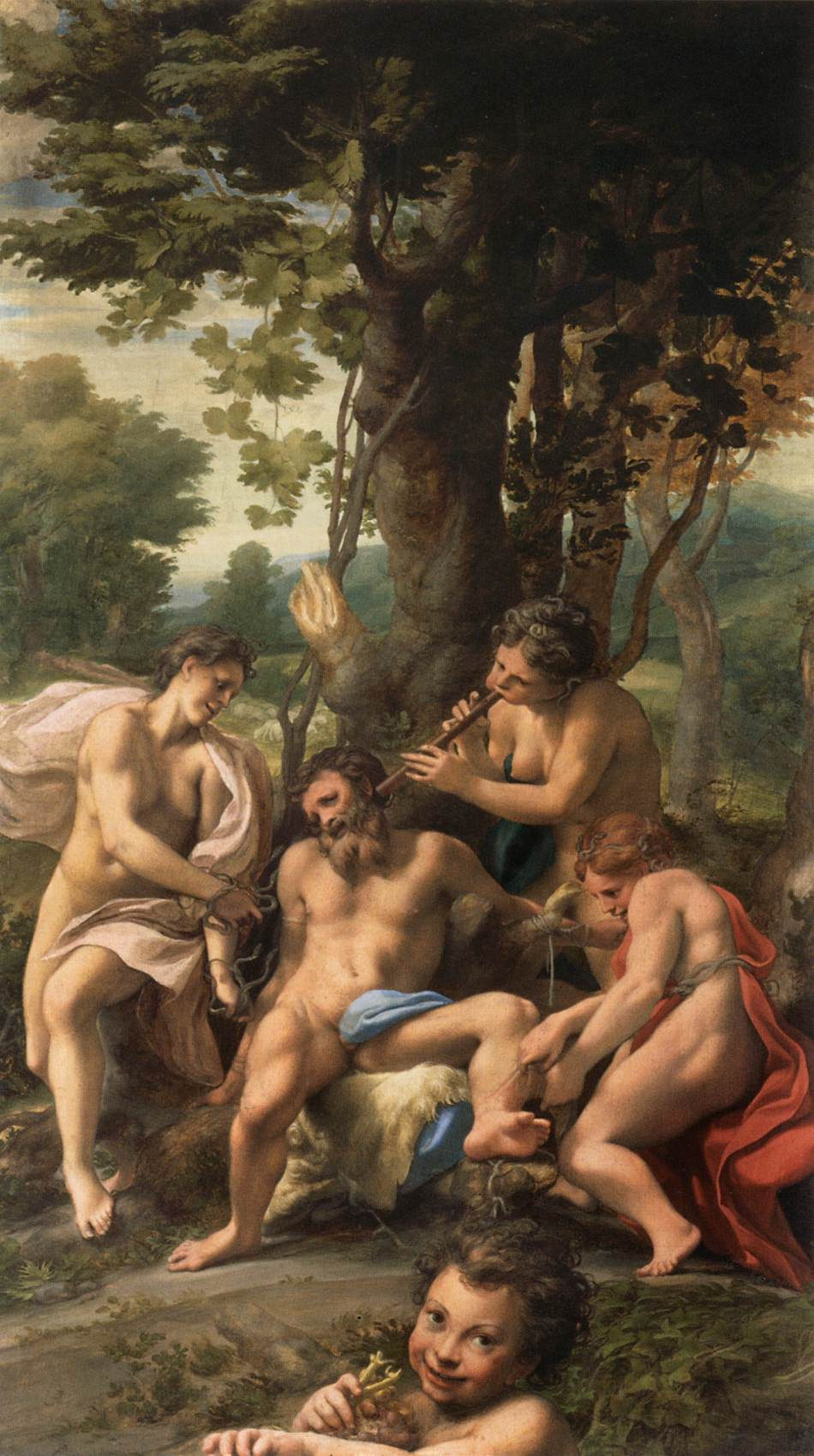
"Allegory of Vice"

=== Dispersal ===
After Isabella's death the studiolo fell into disuse and in 1605 its paintings were moved to another part of the palace. Around 1627 Charles I of Nevers gave them to cardinal Richelieu, who took them to Paris and added them to Louis XIV's collection. After the French Revolution they thus entered the collection of the Louvre Museum. The other furnishings were sold off and are now split between several different museums. The pavement tiles were lifted and sold off separately and are now in several Italian and foreign museums, including the applied art collections at the Castello Sforzesco, the Louvre, the Museo Bardini in Florence and the Victoria and Albert Museum in London

== Collections ==
=== Sculpture ===
She had a great passion for collecting ancient sculpture, limited only by her lack of money and the papal ban on exporting such sculptures from Rome. However, thanks to help from the knight of Malta Fra Sabba da Castiglione, she was able to acquire original ancient Greek sculptures from Nasso and Rodi and fragments of the Mausoleum of Halicarnassus. A sarcophagus relief showing Hermes looking for Proserpina in Hades was built into the wall under the window of the studiolo.

She paid art agents in the main Italian cities through whom she heard of opportunities for improving her collection. One of these was the sale of Michele Vianello's collections in Venice in 1506, at which she bought a late-antique onyx vase. She also acquired some alabaster heads looted from the palazzo Bentivoglio in Bologna, despite knowing their provenance. She forced Mantegna to sell her an ancient Roman bust of a woman in 1498 since it was said to resemble her and later, when he was old and sick, forced him to give her his favourite bust of Faustina the Elder in return for paying off his debts. When she heard that Gian Galeazzo Sforza was about to die and had left her part of his collection, she sent emissaries to Milan even before his death to safeguard the relevant artworks.

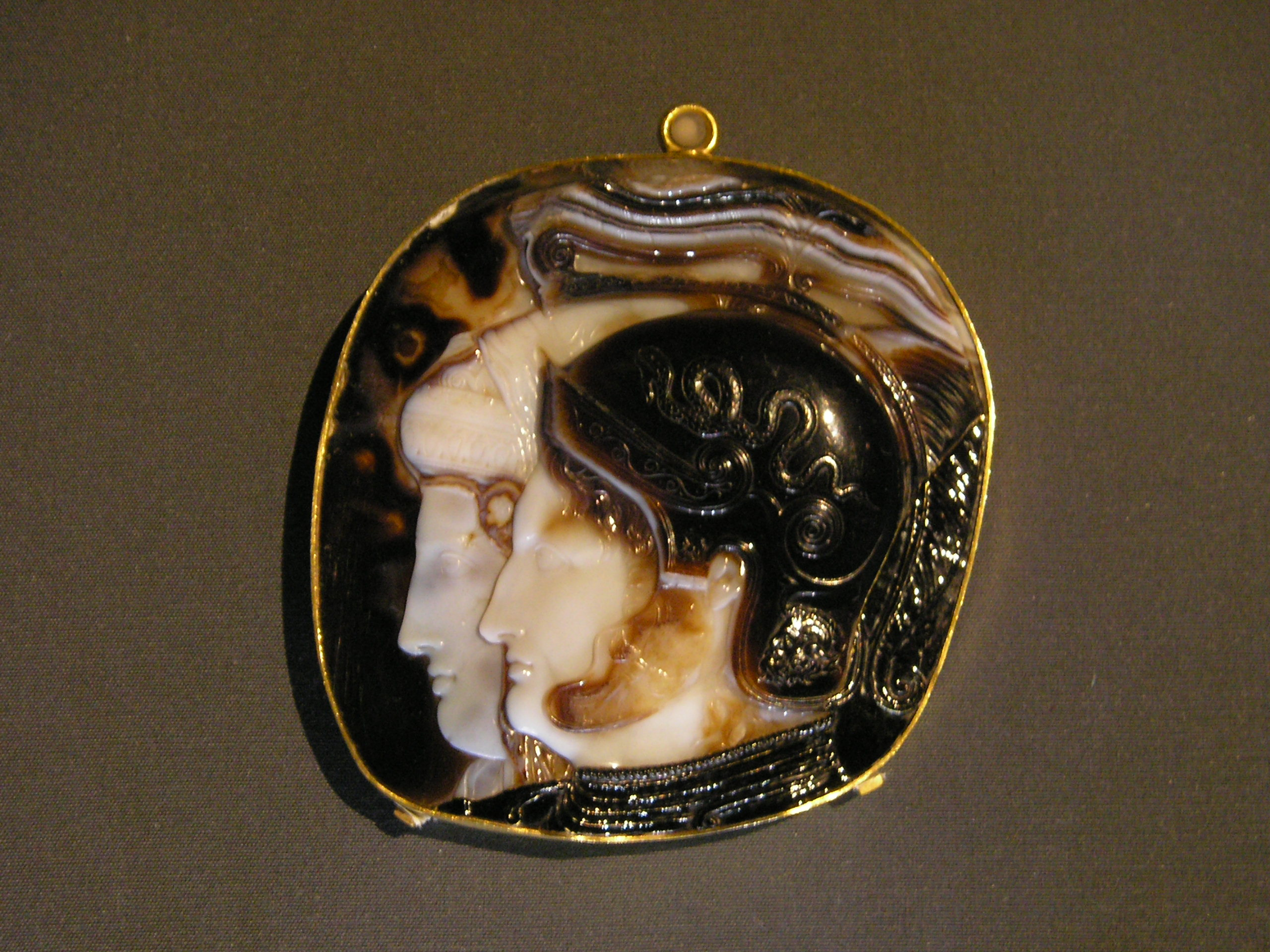
Cameo, Ptolemaic, 3rd century BC, from Isabella d'Este's collection, now in the Kunsthistorisches Museum.

Her modern artworks included Michelangelo's Cupid, of which she was particularly fond. It had been suggested to her as a possible purchase in 1496 - she initially declined it as only an imitation of an ancient work of art, but on learning it was by Michelangelo keenly sought to acquire it. It was then owned by the Montefeltro family of Urbino, but when Cesare Borgia overthrow them she acquired it from him. When the Montefeltro family was restored to power she refused to return it to them, despite being related to them. It was displayed beside an ancient sculpture of Cupid attributed to Praxiteles, inviting comparisons between modern and ancient sculpture. She acquired small bronzes by Pier Jacopo Alari Bonacolsi reproducing some of the famous statues of antiquity - one of these, Hercules and Antaeus, is now in the Kunsthistorisches Museum in Vienna. Her ancient sculptures also included busts, agate and jasper vases and bas reliefs.

=== Other ===
Isabella's collection also included medals, cameos (such as the noted Gonzaga Cameo), gems, classical coins, wooden-inlay panels and curiosities such as gilded cages, clocks and a 'unicorn's horn'. It also included objects she kept for sentimental reasons, such as a beechwood cabinet made by her brother Alfonso II d'Este in his spare time.

== Bibliography (in Italian) ==
- Mauro Lucco (a cura di), Mantegna a Mantova 1460-1506, catalogo della mostra, Skira Milano, 2006
- Alberta De Nicolò Salmazo, Mantegna, Electa, Milano 1997.
- Andrea Ciaroni, Maioliche del Quattrocento a Pesaro, frammenti di storia dell'arte ceramica dalla bottega dei Fedeli, CentroDi, Firenze 2004.
- Stefano L'Occaso, Il Palazzo Ducale di Mantova, Milano, 2002.
