= Church of the Commenda, Faenza =

Roman Catholic church in Emilia-Romagna, Italy

Coordinates: 44.2817°N 11.8932°E

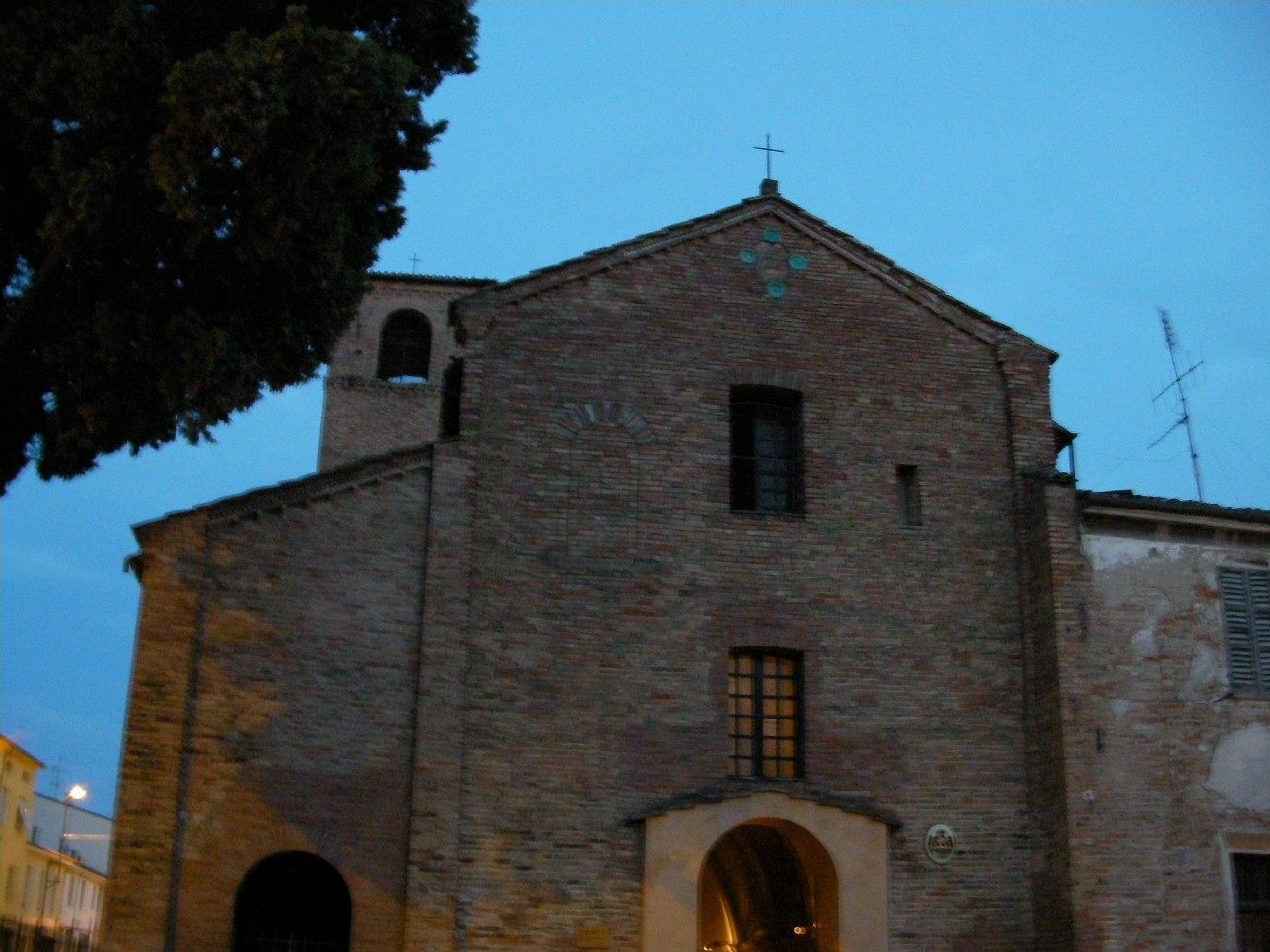
Façade of the Church of the Commenda

The Church of the Commenda is a Romanesque-style, Roman Catholic church located on Corso Europa in the Piazza Fra Sabba da Castiglione of Faenza, region of Emilia-Romagna, Italy.

== History ==
The church was founded in the early 12th century, and part of the remaining apse, bell-tower, and portico date to the following two centuries. It was erected adjacent to the Hostel of the Holy Sepulchre (Ospizio del Santo Sepolcro), used to house pilgrims traveling to and from the Holy Land. In the 13th century, the church was affiliated with the Knights of the Order of Malta. During the 16th century, the church and adjacent cloister were decorated, including Renaissance frescoes in the apse (1533) by Girolamo da Treviso. On the left wall is a monochrome fresco of An abbot being presented by St Joseph to the Virgin with John the Baptist and Mary Magdalen. Below is the tomb of the abbot Fra Sabba, completed in 1554 by Francesco Menzocchi. Traces of 14th-century frescoes are also found on the walls.
