= Gian Battista Covo =

Italian architect (1480s–1546)

Gian Battista Covo or Battista da Covo (c. 1486 – 1546) was an Italian architect. From 1513 until 1524 he was "Prefect of the Gonzaga Buildings" ("Prefetto delle fabbriche gonzaghesche") under Francesco II Gonzaga. He designed the second phase of the Studiolo of Isabella d'Este on the ground floor of the "Corte Vecchia" of the Ducal Palace. In 1524 he started collaborating with Giulio Romano, who that year took over as prefect.
