= Sabba da Castiglione =

Sabba da Castiglione, fra' Sabba da Castiglione or Saba da Castiglione (1480 – 16 March 1554) was an Italian Renaissance humanist, writer and member of the Knights Hospitaller.

== Life ==
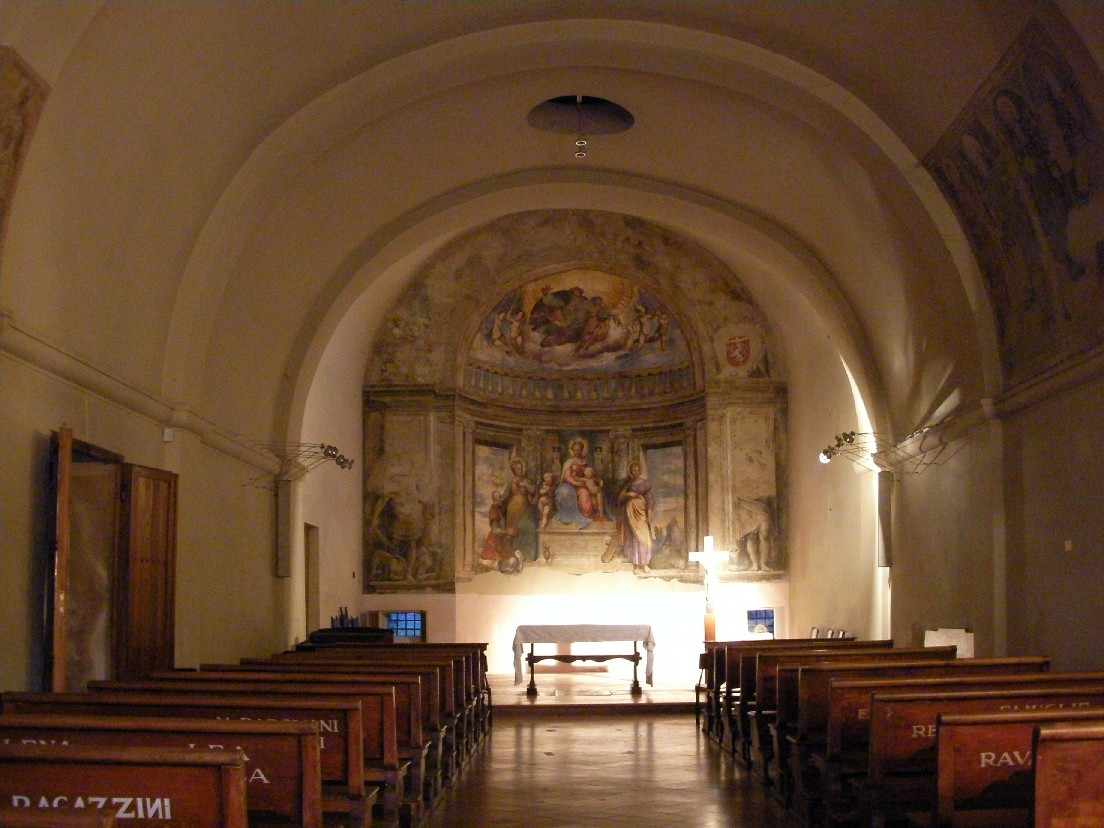
The apse fresco in the church of Santa Maria Maddalena of Faenza

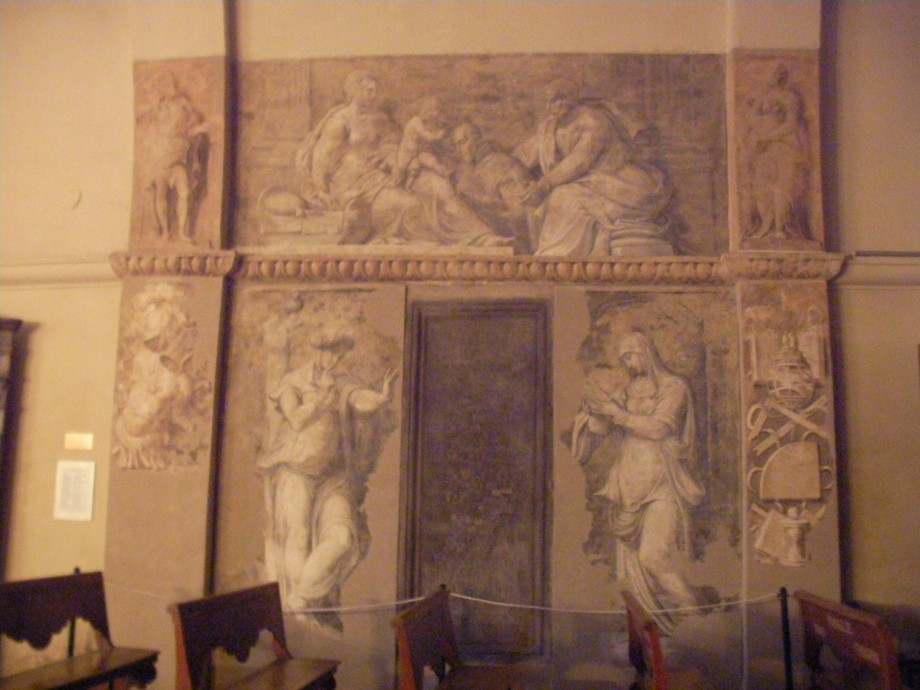
The tomb fresco in the church of Santa Maria Maddalena of Faenza

Born into a noble family in Milan, he studied law, philosophy and theology at the University of Pavia. After a short stay in Mantua, he decided to enter the Knights Hospitaller in 1505 aged only twenty-five. He later became their deputy procurator general. He was stationed on Rhodes until 1508, when he moved to Rome, where he cultivated a love of art and literature.

He then decided to leave Rome's corruption and worldliness and between 1515 and 1519 set up home in Faenza, where he became commendatory abbot of the church of Santa Maria Maddalena on Borgo Durbecco - the church is thus still nicknamed the "Chiesa della Commenda" after him. He devoted himself to study, charity and patronage of the arts. He collected books, sculptures and artworks, founded a free public school for poor children and opened a pilgrims' hospice. In 1525 he promised to finance the restoration of the church's monastic buildings as a base for the Knights. In 1533 he commissioned Girolamo da Treviso to decorate the church's main apse with a fresco of The Madonna Enthroned between Saints Mary Magdalene and Catherine of Alexandria. In 1554 he also commissioned a monochrome fresco from Francesco Menzocchi, an artist from Forlì - it showed St Joseph presenting Castiglione himself, now an old man, to the Virgin Mary. He also had his tomb sited under Menzocchi's fresco and wrote the Latin epitaph for the tomb.

== Writings ==
- Il lamento pietoso del disgraziato Glonico pastore d'amore e di Delia crudele da lui sommamente amata, Venice, 1528.
- Consolatoria, Bologna, 1529.
- Ricordi, Venice, 1554 - 25 editions before 1613

== Sources ==
- Anna Rosa Gentilini, ed. (2004). Sabba da Castiglione 1480-1554, Dalle corti rinascimentali alla Commenda di Faenza, Atti del Convegno. Faenza, 19-20 maggio 2000 (in Italian). Leo S. Olschki editore.
- S. Cortesi, ed. (1999). Ricordi ovvero ammaestramenti di fra Sabba da Castiglione (in Italian). Tipografia faentina ed.
