= Lorenzo da Pavia =

Italian musical instrument maker

Lorenzo da Pavia (died 1517) was an Italian musical instrument maker, active in Venice in the late 15th and early 16th centuries. He corresponded with Isabella d'Este, advising her on her studiolo in Mantua and producing a 1496 virginal for her.
