= Antonio della Mola =

Italian artist

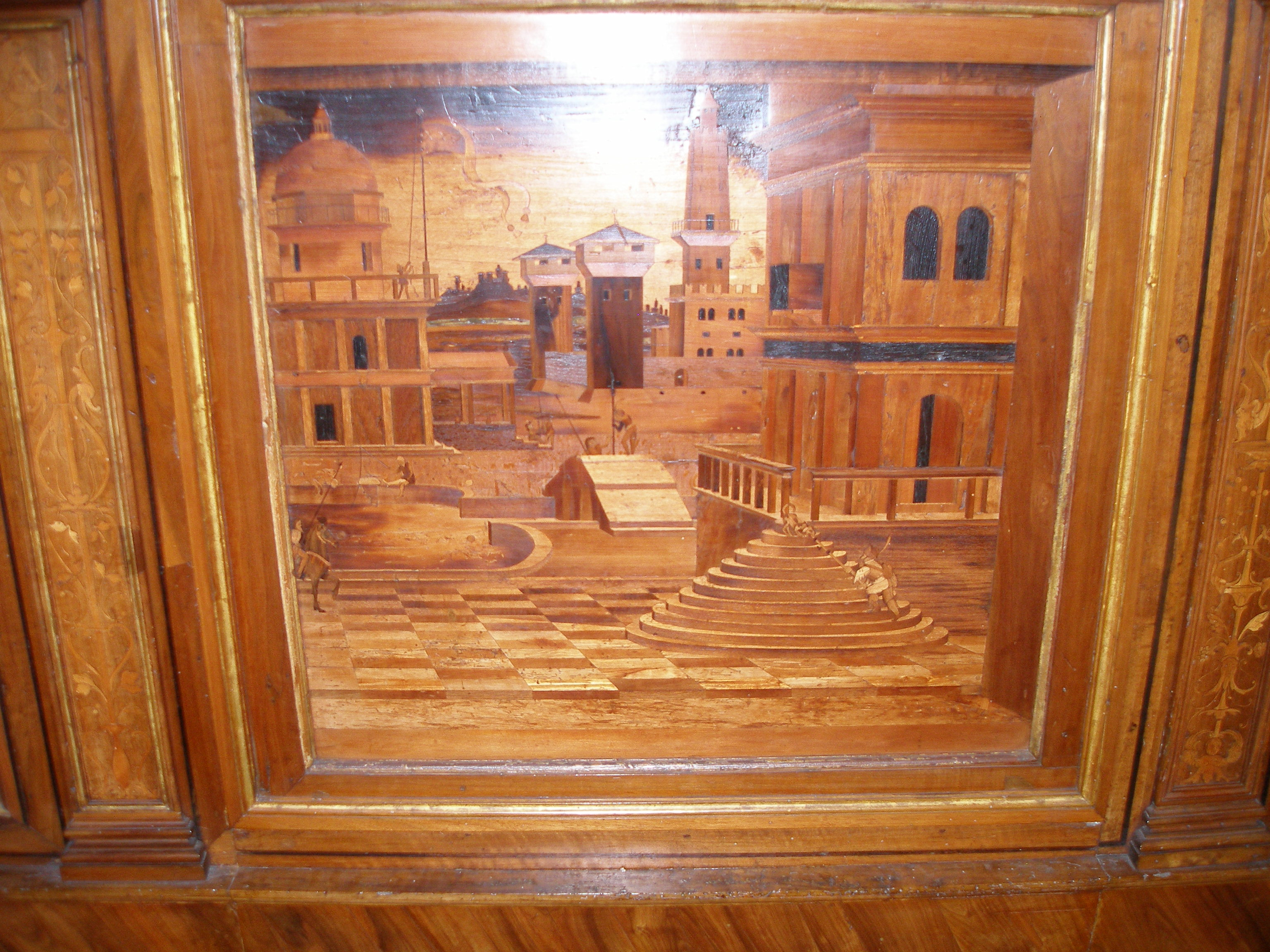
Wood inlay, Appartamento della Grotta of Isabella d'Este, Ducal Palace, Mantua.

Antonio della Mola was a 16th-century Italian artist who worked in intaglio and wood-inlay, as well as producing sculptures in marble.

Born in Mantua, he worked alongside his brother Paolo in Mantua and Carpi. In Mantua he worked under the guidance of Giulio Romano and also created the scheme of wooden panels in the grotto of the studiolo of Isabella d'Este at the Ducal Palace. He also created wooden inlay panels for the sacristy wardrobes in San Marco Basilica and marble sculptures for the Ducal Palace, both in Venice.
