= Santa Sofia, Lendinara =

Church in Lendinara, Veneto, Italy

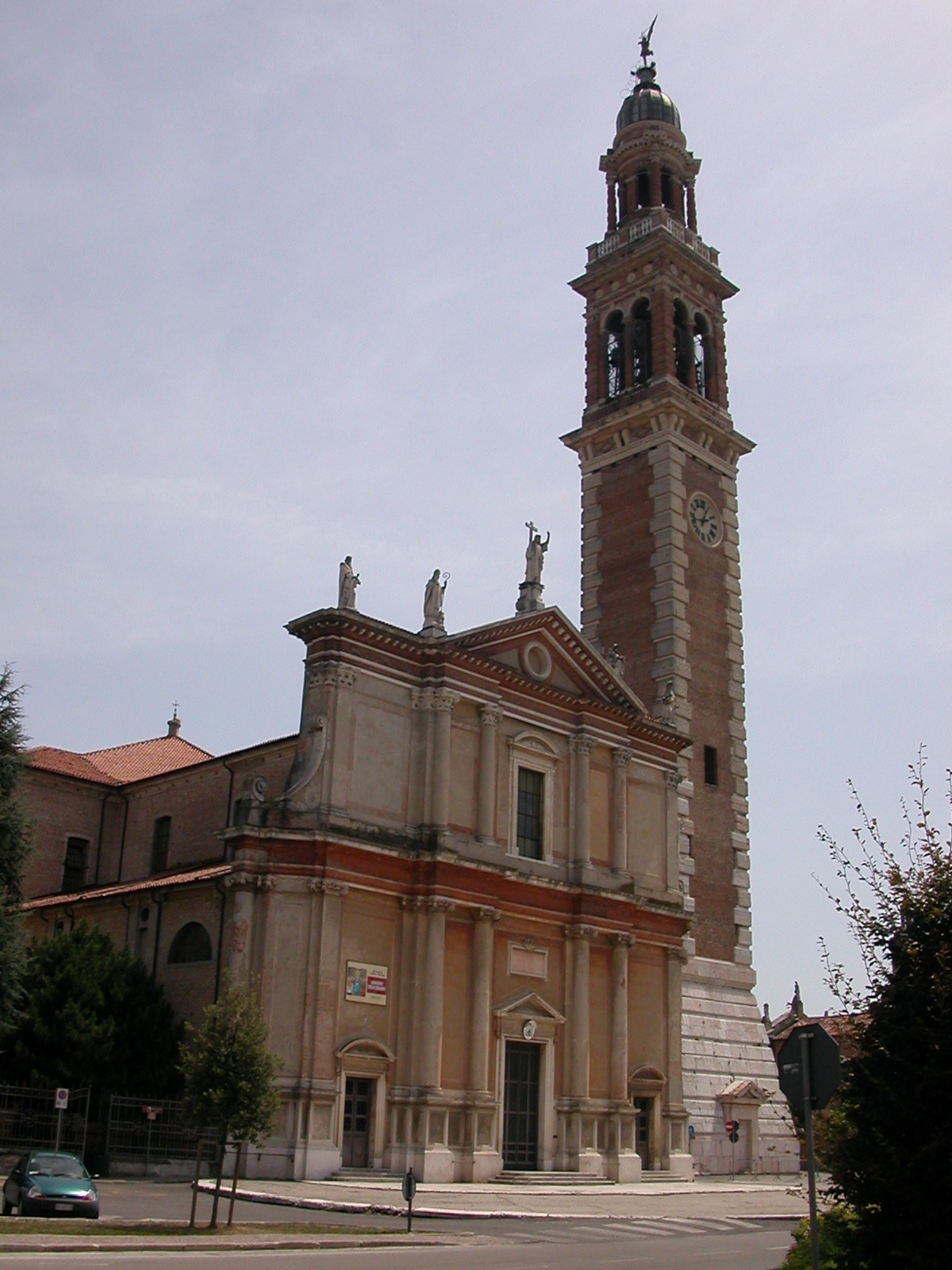
Church of Santa Sofia in Lendinara, Rovigo, Italy

The Church of Santa Sofia (Italian: Duomo di Lendinara) is a Roman Catholic church in the city of Lendinara, in the Province of Rovigo, region of Veneto, Italy.

== History ==
The church was built in 1070 atop the ruins of a pagan temple as an oratory of the Cattaneo family. Around 1550, it became property of the Molin family, and by 1674 was in a dilapidated state. In 1760 the Molin-Minio family commissioned the architect Angelo Santini to restore the church. Refurbishment took years. The facade and bell-tower were designed by Francesco Antonio Baccari and construction also took decades (1797-1857). Originally two bell-towers were planned.

The frescoes in the apse (1796) and cupola, depicting a Transfiguration in the former and a Triumph of the Church and the Four Doctors in the latter, were painted by Giorgio Anselmi. In 1938 Poloni and Casanova restored the murals.

The first altar on left has a canvas of St Antony of Padua (1942) by the painter Casanova. The second altar on the left houses a Virgin of the Rosary and Saints by Giovanni Battista Albrizzi. This painting was originally the main altarpiece of the church of San Giuseppe. In the third altar on left is a canvas depicting the Sacred Heart of Jesus painted in 20th century by B. Biagetti. The fourth altar on left has a canvas depicting an Enthroned Virgin with Shield and Angelic Musicians (1511) by Domenico Mancini.

Another work is an Enthroned Madonna and child with St Lawrences and Anthony of Padua (16th-century) by Francesco Bissolo; an Ecce Homo (1615) by Domenico Fetti.

In the first altar on the right is a Madonna and Child with souls of Purgatory (circa 1700) by Antonio Zanchi, commissioned by the Confraternity della Morte, the sponsors of the chapel. On the second altar on right is a canvas depicting the Descent of the Holy Spirit (circa 1765) by Domenico Maggiotto. On the 3rd altar of right is a canvas depicting Saints Apostles Peter and James (allegory of the Papacy of 1700) also by Zanchi.

The main altarpiece depicts the Martyrdom of Santa Sofia and her daughters Faith, Hope and Charity (1793) by Carlo Alvise Fabris. On the walls of the presbytery, next to the busts of the Scipioni and the Cappellini, are two paintings depicting the Saints Augustine, Benedict, Scolastica, Clare, and Placido (1783) and a Madonna and Child in Glory with Saints Andrea Avellino, Cajetan, and Valentine (1787) by Agostino Ugolini.

In the sacristy is a wooden scale model of the bell-tower. Also there is a canvas depicting the Life of St Costanzo (1730 ca.) by Bartolomeo Litterini, two 17th-century canvases by Pietro Vecchia, some portraits, a copy of Titian and a poorly conserved altarpiece by Matteo dei Pitocchi.
