= De Dominicis =

De Dominicis is an Italian surname. Spellings include De Dominicis, de Dominicis, and DeDominicis. Notable people with the surname include:

- Domenico de Dominicis (died 1478), Italian bishop
- Gino De Dominicis (1947–1998), Italian artist
- Luca De Dominicis (born 1973), Italian actor

== See also ==
- Dominici (surname)
