= Domenico Mancini =

Italian painter

Domenico Mancini (born late 15th century, died in 16th century) was an Italian painter of the Venetian mainland, painting in a High Renaissance style. Mancini was either a pupil or a close follower of Giorgione and Giovanni Bellini. He is said to have worked alongside Pietro Maria Pennacchi.

== Biography ==
Little is known about the painter. He is known for one signed altarpiece, an Enthroned Madonna and Child with Lute-playing Angel, painted in 1511 for the former church of San Francesco in Lendinara He indicates on the painting that he is a Venetian. This work has been called a variation upon Giovanni Bellini's 1505 altarpiece in San Zaccaria, Venice. Other works include a Madonna with St John the Baptist and St Peter in Florence and a Sacra Conversazione in the Louvre. A portrait signed Domenicus is attributed to him. Crowe and Calcaselle erroneously speculated whether Francesco Domenici of Treviso might be the son of Mancini, and also erroneously whether Mancini might be the same painter as Domenico Capriolo, another contemporary Giorgionista of Treviso.
