= Pier Maria Pennacchi =

Italian painter

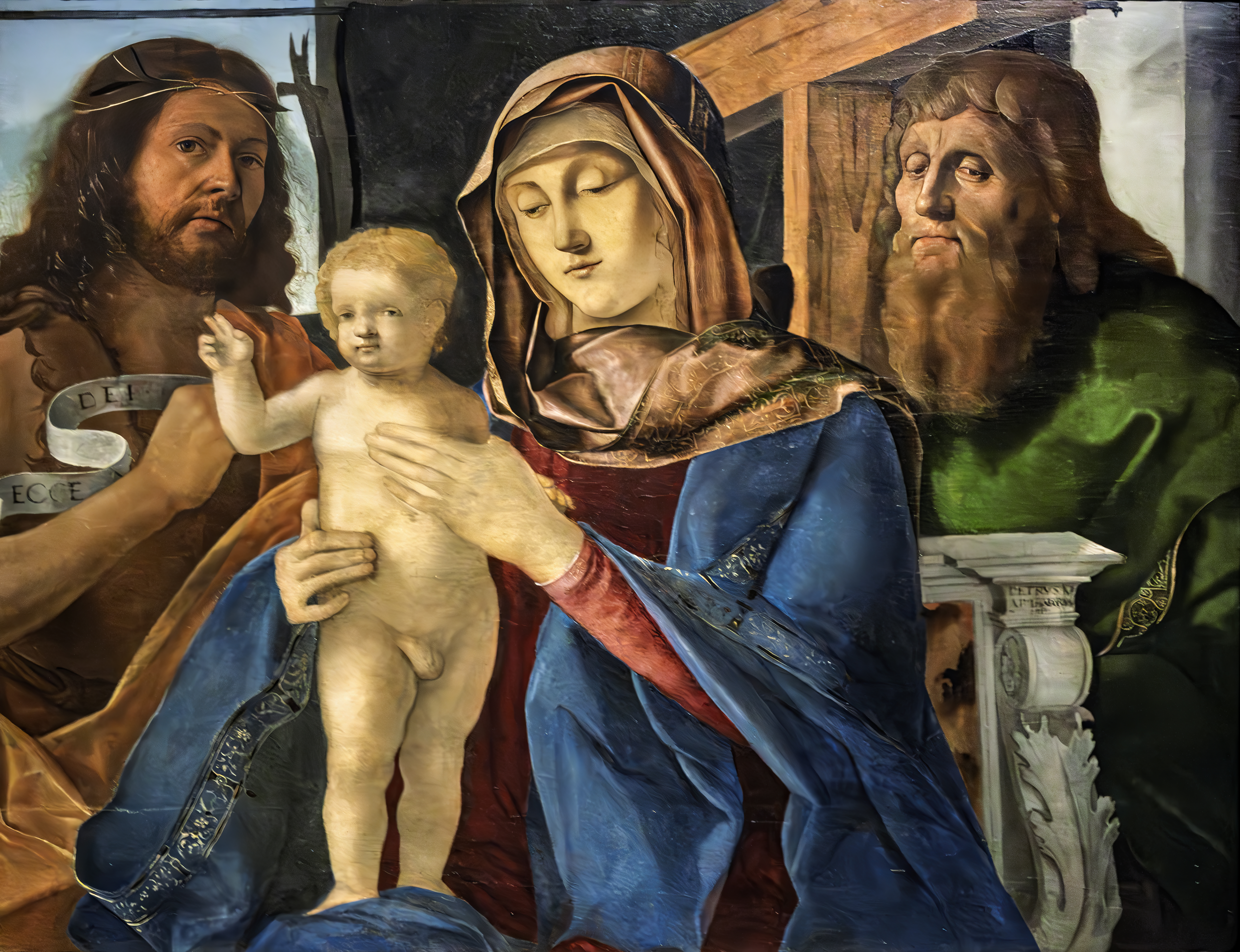
Madonna with Child between St. John the Baptist and St. Andrew

Pier Maria Pennacchi (1464 – before 1515) was an Italian Renaissance painter primarily active in Treviso. His one documented work is a fresco of Christ for a chapel in the Treviso Cathedral. In Venice, the ceiling of the church of Santa Maria dei Miracoli is often attributed to him, as are the Annunciation frescoes in San Francesco della Vigna and a Madonna which came to be placed in the sacristy of the church of Santa Maria della Salute. One of his pupils was Girolamo da Treviso.
