= Pedro César Dominici =

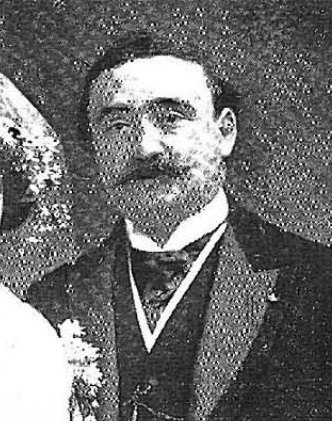

Pedro César Dominici (Carúpano, estado Sucre, Venezuela, February 18, 1873 – Buenos Aires, Argentina, August 23, 1954) was a writer, playwright and Venezuelan diplomat.

== Biography ==
Co-founder of the magazine Cosmópolis with Luis Urbaneja Archepohl and his friend and writer Pedro Emilio Coll. He published several works for the magazine El Cojo Ilustrado, and was the founder of two newspapers of Carúpano, El Noticiero and El Bien Público. He was director of the magazine Venezuela between 1905 and 1909 in París; this magazine circulated only clandestinely in Venezuela.

Represented Venezuela in the Government of Juan Vicente Gómez as Extraordinary Envoy and Minister Plenipotentiary in Italy, Spain, England, Argentina, Chile and Uruguay. In 1890, he was General Consul in Rome.

== Theater ==
- The Man Who Returned (drama, 1949)
- The House (Dramatic comedy, 1949)
- The Sad Venus (Comedy, 1950)
- Angelica (Dramatic comedy, 1950)
- The Golden Cage (Dramatic comedy, 1950)
- Red Love, The Drama of the Crowds, (1951)

== Works ==
- Ideas and Impressions (París, 1897)
- Voluptuous Sadness (Novel, Caracas, 1899)
- The Triumph of the Ideal (Novela, París, 1901)
- A Stratopra (Novel, Caracas 1901)
- Dionysos (Novel, 1904)
- Apollonian Book (Chronicles and Essays, Caracas, 1909)
- Vacant Thrones (Reviews, Buenos Aires, 1914)
- The Condor (Novel, Buenos Aires, 1925)
- Under the Autumn Sun (Buenos Aires, 1947)
- Evocation (The novel of an unhappy love) (Novel, 1949)

== Bibliography ==
- Contreras, Álvaro (2010). "La experiencia decadente. Sobre Pedro César Dominici" (PDF). Voz y escritura. Revista de estudios literarios. (in Spanish) (18). Mérida: Editorial Venezolana: 99–120. ISSN 1315-8392. Archived from the original (PDF) on April 11, 2016.
- González, Aníbal (1996). González Echevarría, Roberto; Pupo-Walker, Enrique (eds.). "Modernist prose". The Cambridge History of Latin American Literature. 2. Cambridge University Press: 69–113. doi:10.1017/CHOL9780521340700.004. ISBN 0-521-34070-5.
