= Girolamo da Treviso =

Italian painter

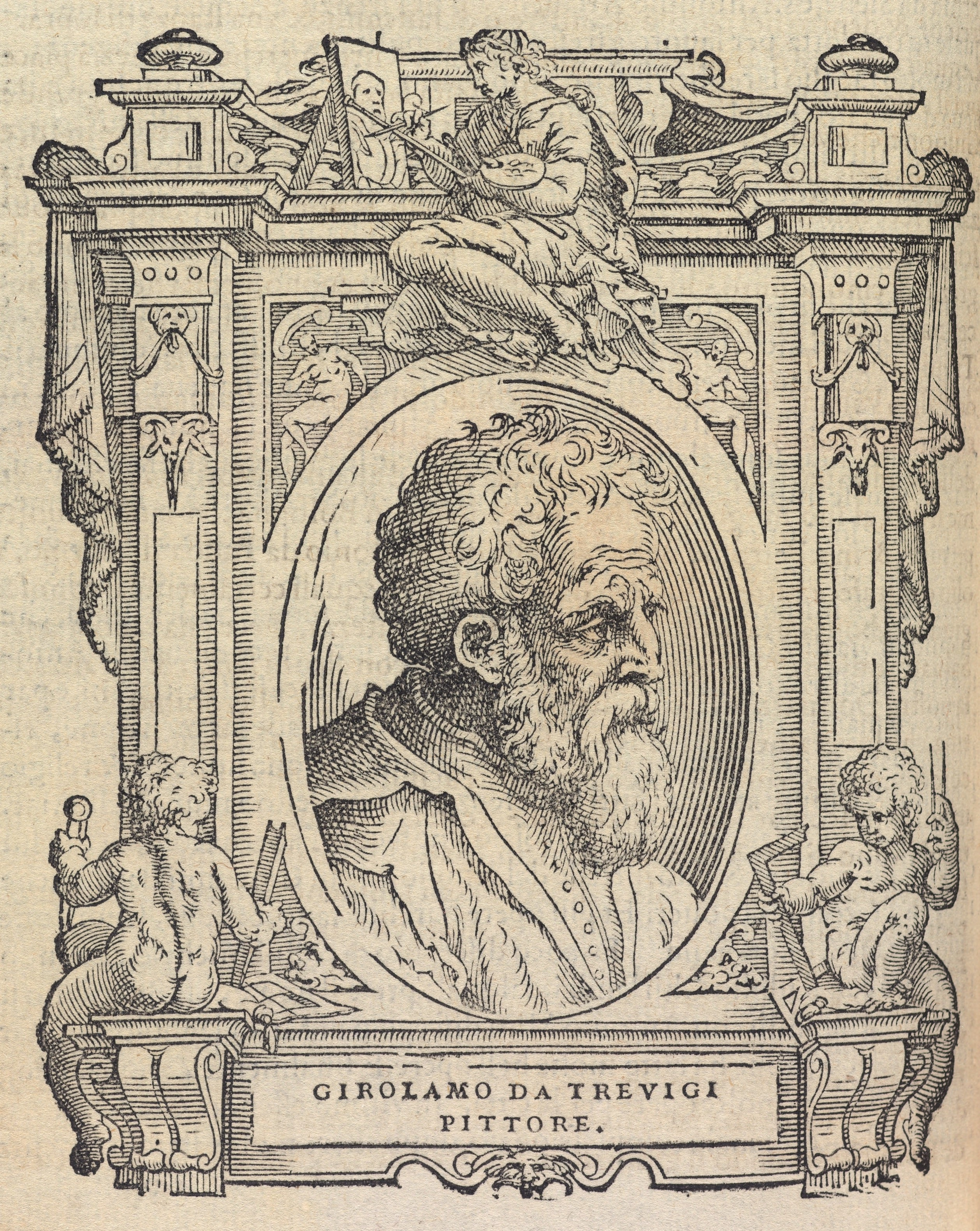
- Portrait in Vasari's Vite
- Born: 1498; Treviso, Republic of Venice
- Died: 1544 (aged 45–46); Boulogne-sur-Mer, France
- Known for: Painting

Girolamo da Treviso (Treviso, 1498 – Boulogne-sur-Mer, September 10, 1544), also known as Girolamo di Tommaso da Treviso the Younger and Girolamo Trevigi, was an Italian Renaissance sculptor and painter in Henry VIII's court in England.

== Biography ==
Born in Treviso, to a Tommaso. The identity of Girolamo da Treviso the Elder, remains unclear.

He was likely not a pupil of Pier Maria Pennacchi, as supposed in the 19th century.

Stylistically, Girolamo is associated with Giorgionismo and the continuation of Giorgione's style, and, while working in Bologna during the 1520s, the influence of Raphael's St. Cecilia. Besides working in Bologna, which included sculptural decoration on the portal of San Petronio and grisaille paintings inside, he also worked in Genoa, Faenza, Trent, and at the Palazzo del Te in Mantua. Giorgio Vasari, in his Lives of the Most Excellent Painters, Sculptors, and Architects, writes that Girolamo traveled to England to work as a military engineer for Henry VIII. He also worked as a painter there, A Protestant Allegory in the Royal Collection shows the Pope on the ground being pelted with large stones by various figures. Girolamo was working as an engineer for Henry when killed by a cannon shot during the Siege of Boulogne in 1544.

== Gallery ==
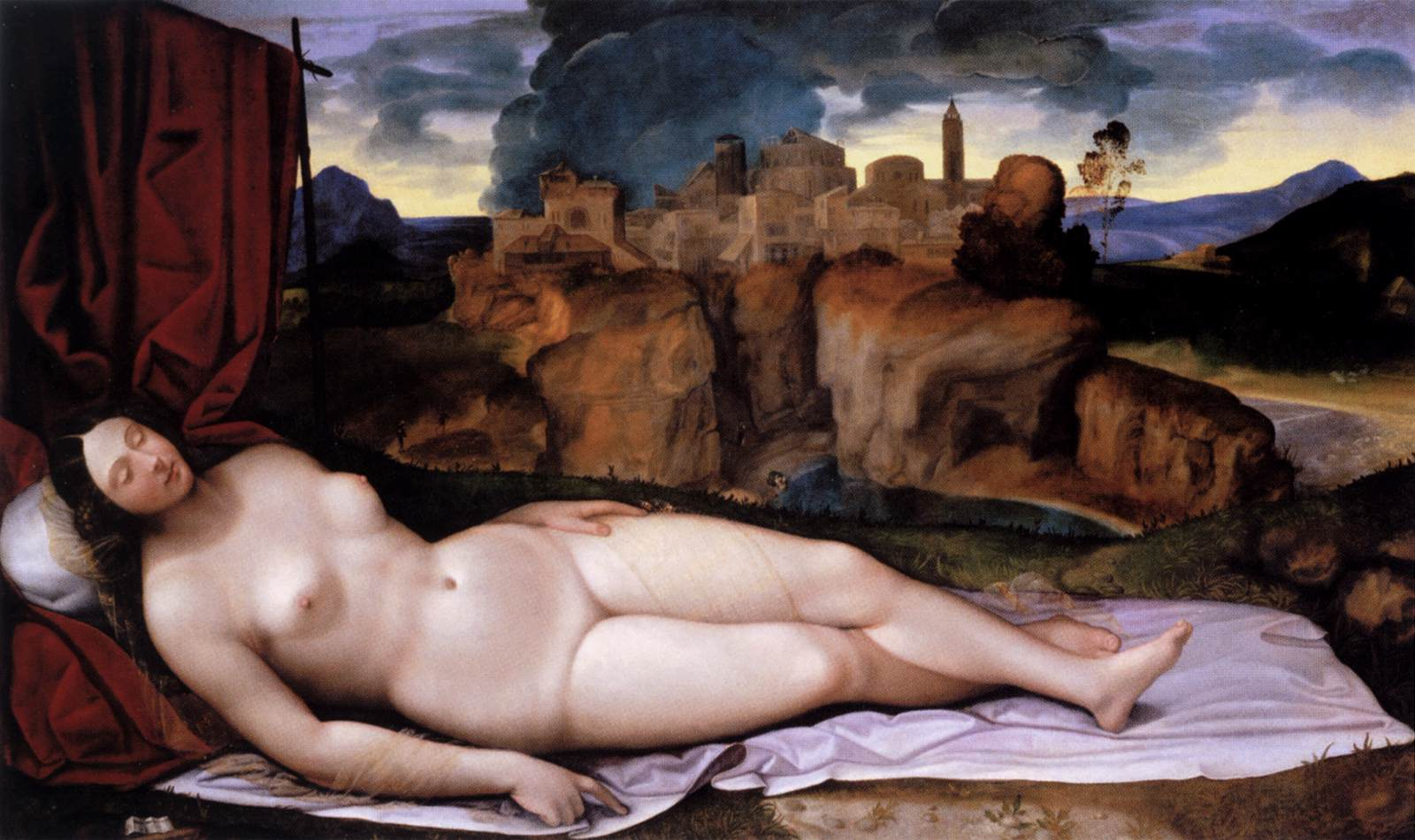
Sleeping Venus

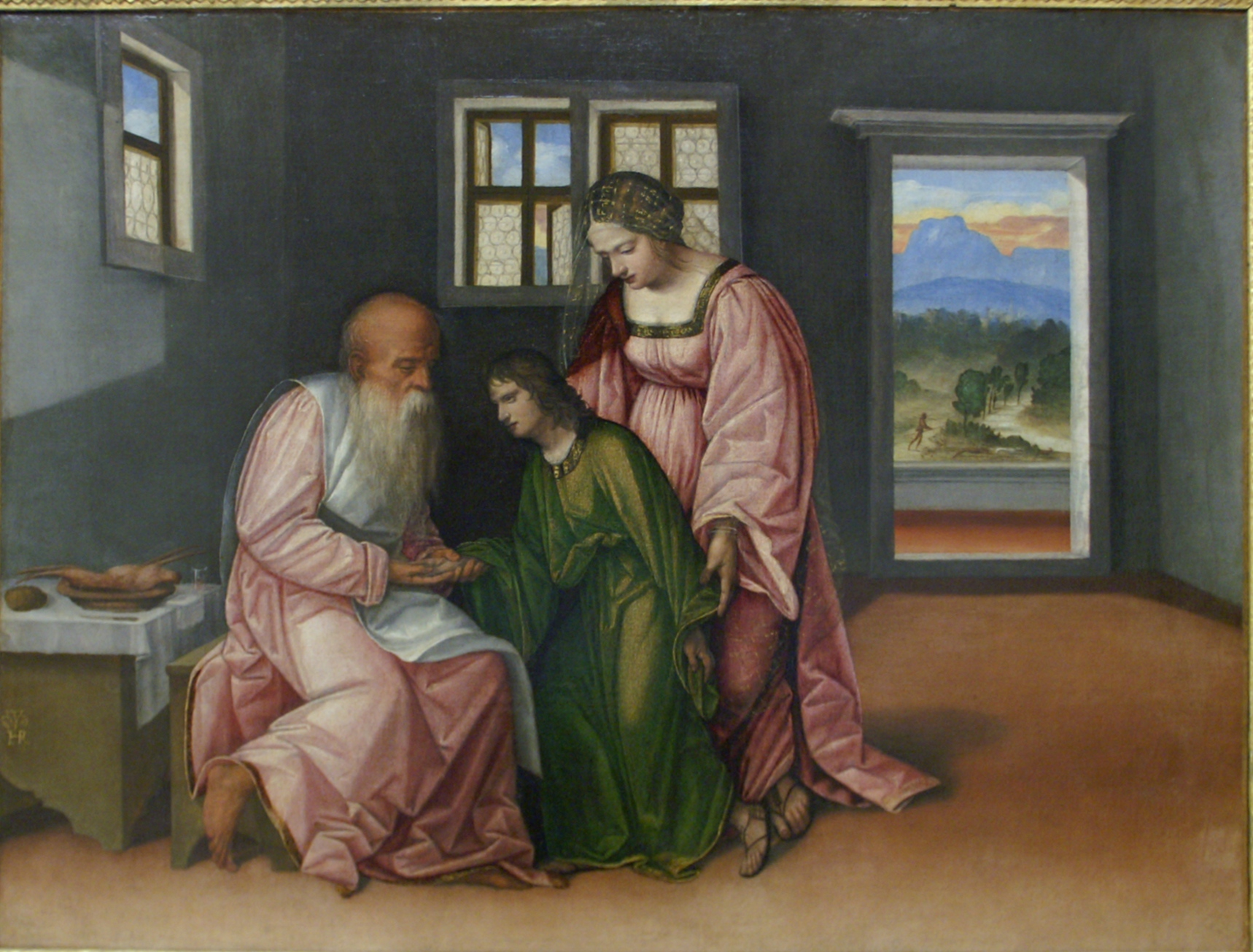
Isaac blessing Jacob, Musée des Beaux-Arts de Rouen.

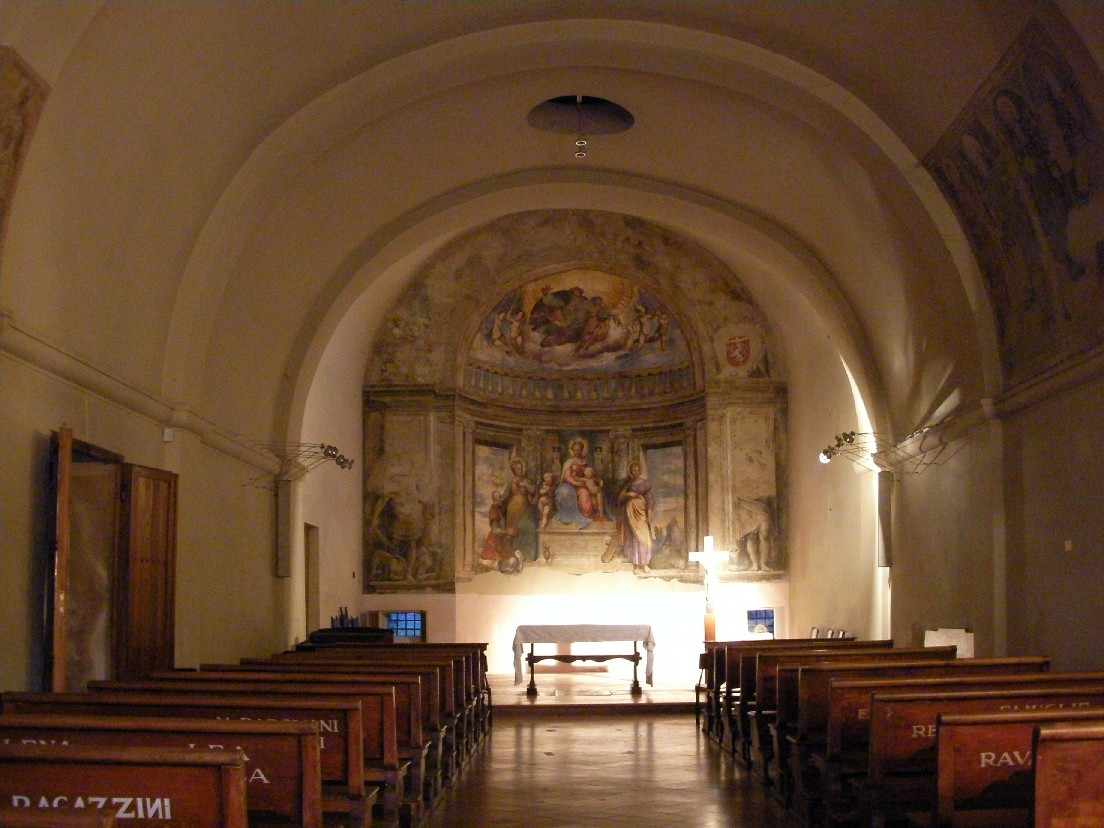
Frescoes in church of Church of the Commenda, Faenza

== See also ==
- Artists of the Tudor court
- List of The Tudors episodes
