= Domenici =

Domenici is an Italian surname. Notable people with the surname include:

- Leonardo Domenici (born 1955), Italian politician
- Pete Domenici (1932–2017), American attorney and politician

== See also ==
- Richard DeDomenici, British artist
