= Francesco Dominici (painter) =

Italian painter

Francesco Dominici, also known as Francesco Fugazza, (circa 1543 – 1578) was an Italian painter, known for his portrait paintings, and active in and near Treviso.

== Biography ==
Francesco had literary aspirations and thus changed his surname from the more commonplace Fugazza to his maternal surname of Dominici. In addition to many portraits, he painted a Procession of the SS. Annunziata for the sacristy of the Duomo of Treviso. He was previously erroneously identified as the son of the Giorgionesque Domenico Mancini by Crowe and Cavalcaselle (1871), or with the contemporary local artist, Francesco di Domenico di Pasqualino da Venezia by Bailo and Biscaro (1900).
