= Richard DeDomenici =

British artist

- Born: Richard DeDomenici
- Education: University of Wales Institute Cardiff
- Known for: Redux, Performance
- Website: dedomenici.com

Richard DeDomenici is a British artist whose "playful" work demonstrates a commitment to a stance against standardisation. He gained notoriety in 2012, when he ran alongside the Olympic Torch before having it confiscated, as well as for his many "Redux" projects, which recreate famous films. DeDomenici's performance piece, "Live From Television Centre", broadcast live on BBC4, was the last broadcast made from the BBC Television Centre, London before it was decommissioned in 2013. DeDomenici's performance was "a disruption of television history that takes place in the exact same locations that these iconic moments".
