= The Holy Family with the Dragonfly =

Engraving by Albrecht Dürer

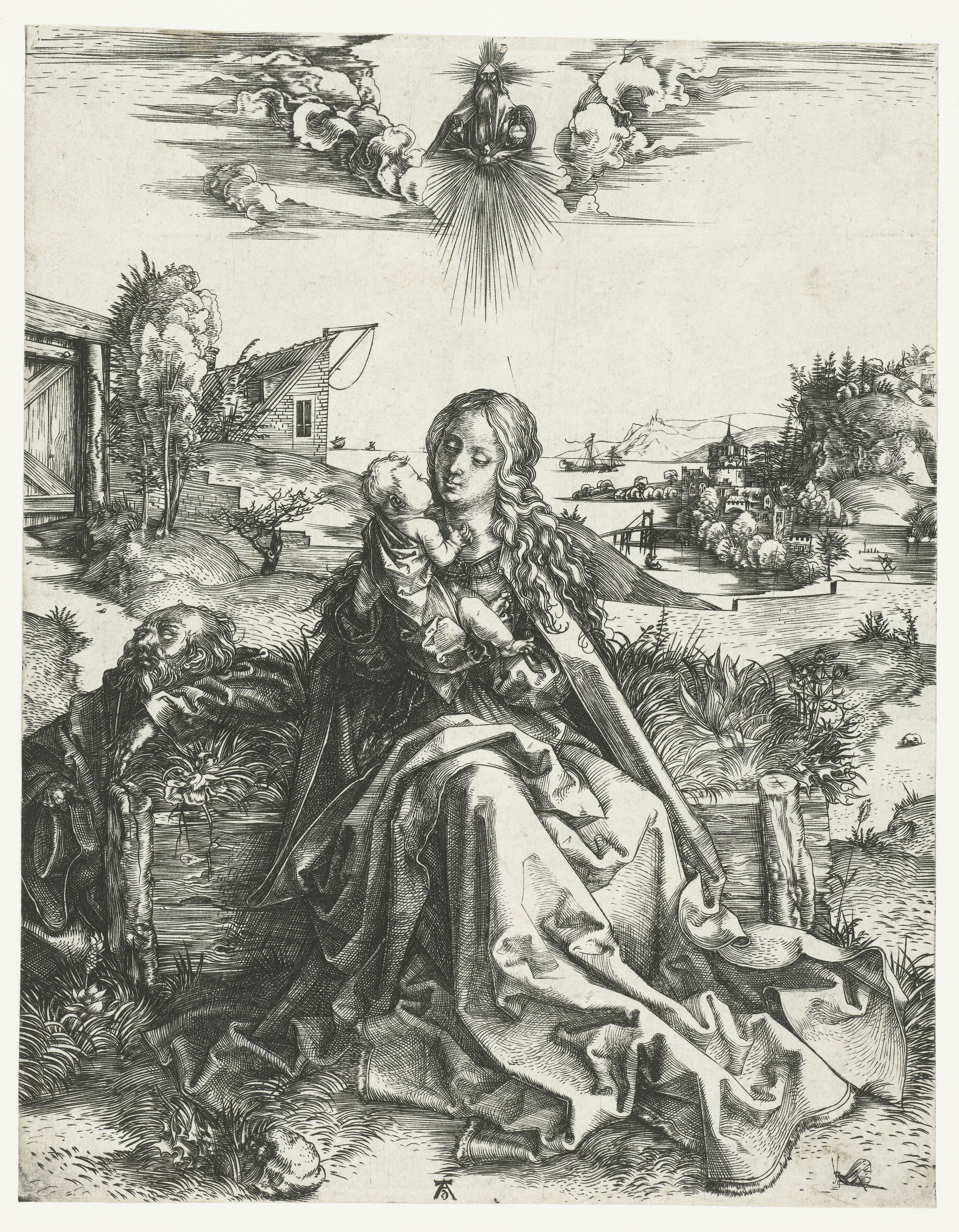
- Artist: Albrecht Dürer
- Year: 1495
- Type: Engraving
- Dimensions: 23.81 cm × 18.4 cm (9.375 in × 7.25 in)

The Holy Family with the Dragonfly, also known as The Holy Family with the Mayfly, The Holy Family with the Locust, and The Holy Family with the Butterfly is an engraving by the German artist Albrecht Dürer (1471–1528) from approximately 1495. It is quite small but full of intricate detail. A very popular image, copied by other printmakers within five years of creation, it is found in most major print room collections, including the Indianapolis Museum of Art and the UK Royal Collection.

== Description ==
The Holy Family with the Dragonfly, alternately known as The Holy Family with the Butterfly, The Holy Family with the Locust, and The Virgin with the Dragonfly, is an early engraving by Dürer. It depicts both the Holy Family and the Holy Trinity, as the Virgin Mary sits on a bench holding Jesus with Joseph beside them, while God the Father and the Holy Ghost in the form of a dove look down from the clouds. In the lower right corner is an insect frequently identified as a dragonfly. However, Dürer may have intended it as a butterfly, a creature whose dramatically transformative life-cycle makes it a perfect symbol of resurrection and redemption. The abundance of beautifully-rendered textures in the richly detailed landscape show how early Dürer mastered the art of engraving.

== History ==
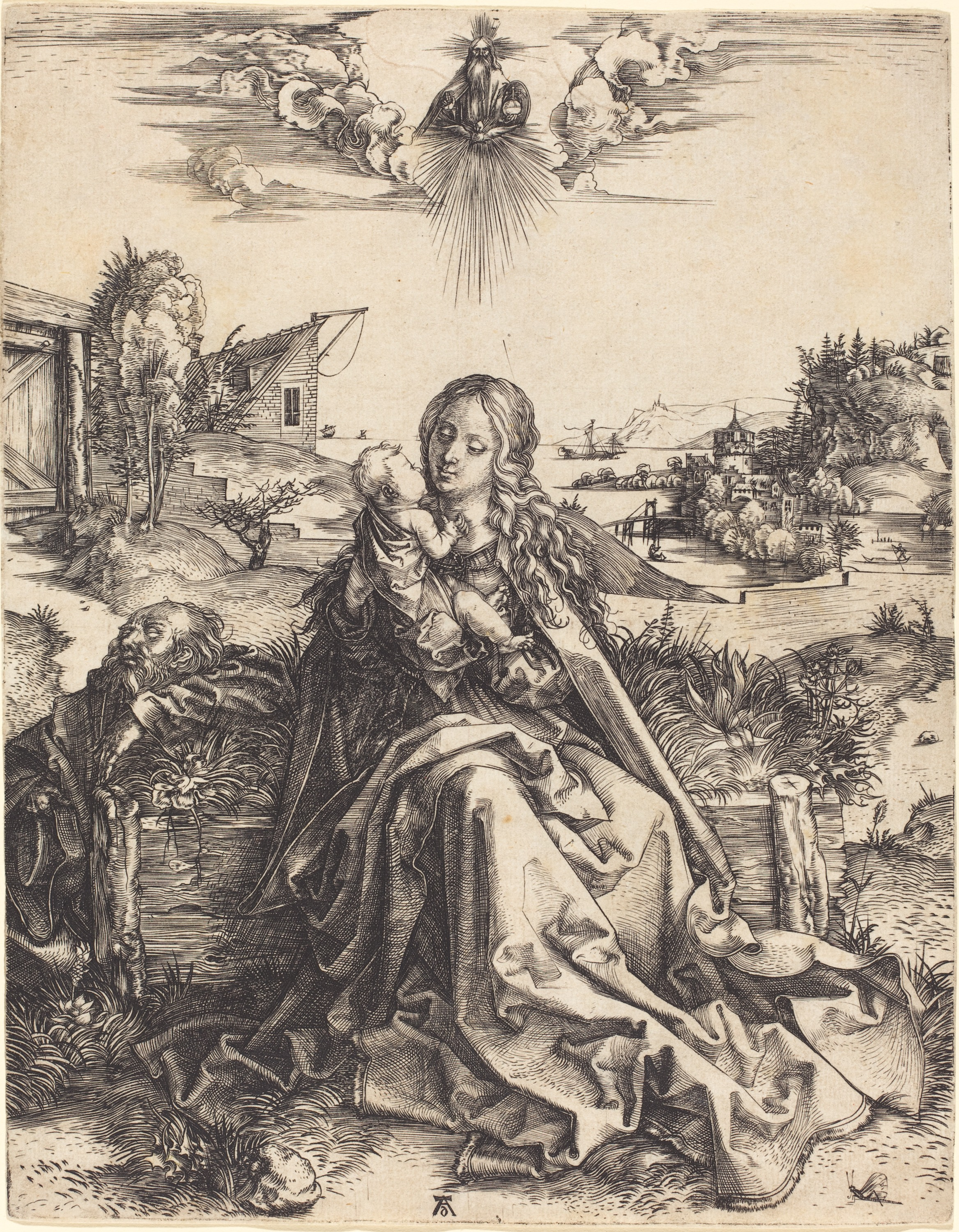
A variant: The Holy Family with the Mayfly (NGA 1943.3.3453)

The exact date of creation is not known. It may have been an imitative piece from his apprenticeship, a copy of older master such as Martin Schongauer. The precise shape of Dürer's monogram is most similar to works dated 1494-95, and the presence of a gondola in the background places it after his 1494 trip to Venice. It is the first print on which he placed his monogram, and the only one in which the D is lowercase. By placing his mark on it, he claimed authorship of the work, unlike the numerous anonymous artists of his day. This act of ownership offered no protection, however, since his international renown as an artistic genius meant copies appeared throughout Italy and Germany by 1500.

In Dürer's Germany, Mary and Jesus were grounded and human, making them highly sympathetic for mere mortals. That meant tender scenes such as this were extremely popular. Dürer made many prints of this theme to be sold in shops and by traveling salesmen so worshipers could paste them into books or attach them to walls as devotional objects.

== Insect ==
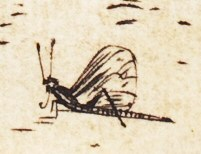
Insect in Dürer's The Holy Family with the Mayfly. Detail of "mayfly" in lower right corner of engraving

The type of insect that Dürer depicted is unclear. While it is commonly named as a dragonfly (Odonata), Kate Heard and Lucy Whitaker in their book The Northern Renaissance. Dürer to Holbein (2011) suggest that he may have meant it to be read as a butterfly (Lepidoptera). They explain that the butterfly's familiar transformation from caterpillar to winged adult was a symbol of resurrection and the soul's redemption, referring to the infant Christ in the Virgin's arms. The painting is indeed sometimes also called the Holy Family with the Butterfly. The insect has also been taken to be a locust (Acrididae) or a praying mantis (Mantodea), "with the symbolic meaning in relation to the Virgin changing accordingly."

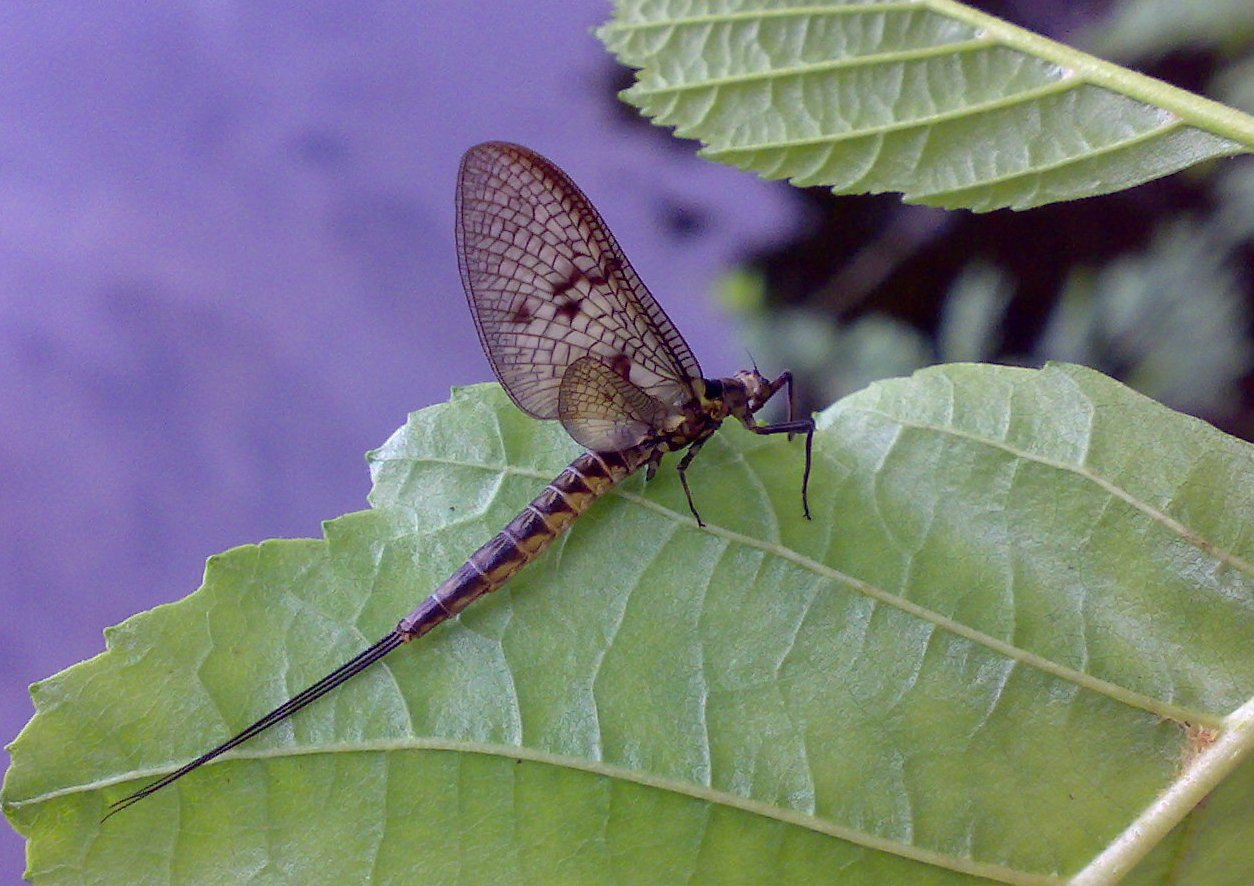
The common European mayfly Ephemera vulgata

A similar engraving in the National Gallery of Art in Washington, D.C. is named The Holy Family with the Mayfly, identifying the insect as a mayfly (Ephemeroptera) signifying the ephemeral nature of human life. The critics Larry Silver and Pamela H. Smith write that the image provides "an explicit link between heaven and earth ... to suggest a cosmic resonance between sacred and profane, celestial and terrestrial, macrocosm and microcosm."

== Collections ==
- Indianapolis Museum of Art (USA)
- Royal Collection (UK)
- National Gallery of Art
- Amsterdam Rijksmuseum (inv.no. RP-P-OB-1204)

== See also ==
- List of engravings by Albrecht Dürer
- List of woodcuts by Albrecht Dürer
- Visitation
- Joachim and Anne Meeting at the Golden Gate
