= Finding in the Temple =

Event from the life of Jesus

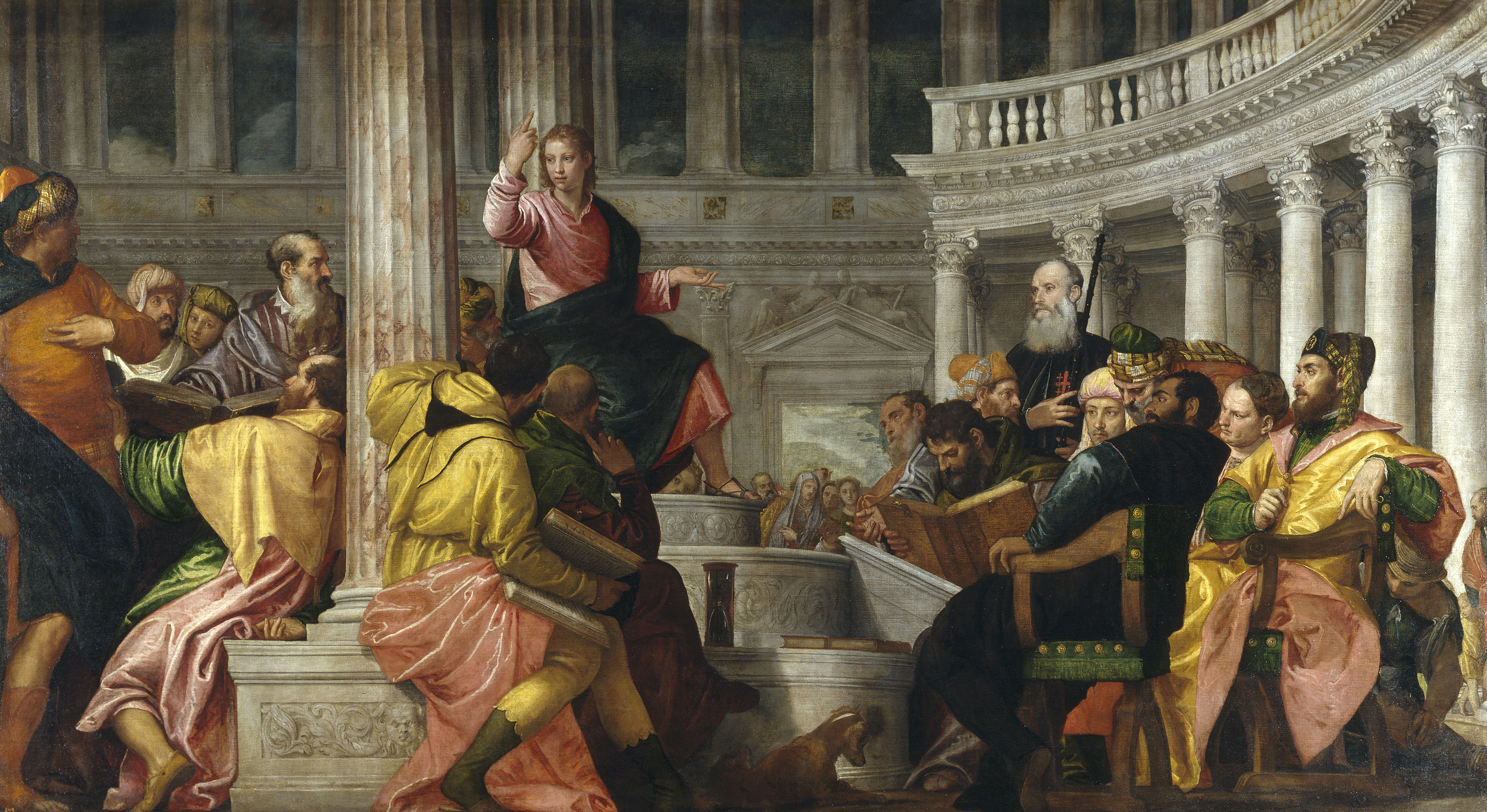
Christ Among the Doctors, c. 1560, by Paolo Veronese

The Finding in the Temple—also called (particularly in art) Christ among the Doctors, the Disputation in the Temple, or variations of those names—is an episode in the early life of Jesus as depicted in the Gospel of Luke (chapter 2). It is the only event of the later childhood of Jesus mentioned in a canonical gospel.

== Gospel account ==
The episode is described in Luke 2:41–52. Jesus, at the age of twelve, accompanies Mary and Joseph, and a large group of their relatives and friends to Jerusalem on many pilgrimages, "according to the custom" – that is, Passover. On the day of their return, Jesus "lingered", staying in the Temple, but Mary and Joseph thought that he was among their group when he was not. Mary and Joseph headed back home and after a day of travel realised Jesus was missing, so they returned to Jerusalem, finding Jesus three days later. He was found in the Temple in discussion with the elders, "listening to them and asking them questions". They were amazed at his learning, especially given his young age. When admonished by Mary, Jesus replied: "How is it that you sought me? Did you not know that I must be in my Father's house?"

The story was slightly elaborated in later literature, such as the apocryphal 2nd-century Infancy Gospel of Thomas (19:1–12). The losing of Jesus is the third of the Seven Sorrows of Mary, and the Finding in the Temple is the fifth Joyful Mystery of the Rosary.

== Commentary ==
Catholic theologian Friedrich Justus Knecht comments on the loss of Jesus by his parents:

Mary lost Jesus through no fault of her own; but with what sorrow she sought Him, with what joy she found Him! We lose Jesus through our own fault when we separate ourselves from Him by mortal sin. This is the greatest of all misfortunes, for he who has lost Jesus, has lost all, and can never be happy without Him. He to whom this misfortune has happened must seek Jesus with sorrow and tears of penance, and he will find Him again in the Temple (His Church), if he will reconcile himself to God by a good and contrite confession.

Jesuit commentator Cornelius a Lapide gives three reasons Jesus is found asking the teachers questions:

(1.) Because it was fitting that the child should ask questions of these learned men, and not teach them.
(2.) To teach the young modesty, and the desire to hear, to question, and to learn, "Lest", says Bede, "if they will not be disciples of the truth, they become masters of error."
(3.) That, asking them questions, He might be questioned in turn by them, and might teach them by His replies.

Scottish Free Church priest William Robertson Nicoll measures the three days (verse 46) from the time when Mary and Joseph had last seen Jesus, not from their re-arrival in Jerusalem, as "the place where they had lodged and the temple would be among the first places visited in the search". Nicoll also notes that some writers suggest the place was a synagogue adjacent to the temple. Senior Church of England cleric F. W. Farrar also observes that "one of the numerous chambers which ran round the Court, and abutted on the actual building" might have been the location.

The Sunday School Teacher of 1881 suggests that a valuable lesson may be learned in reflecting on "how, at the bidding of His parents, [Jesus] immediately accompanied them home, setting in His obedience a lovely example to all children".

Pope John Paul II refers to the story as "joy mixed with drama". Jesus "appears in his divine wisdom as he listens and raises questions, already in effect one who "teaches". The revelation of his mystery as the Son wholly dedicated to his Father's affairs proclaims the radical nature of the Gospel, in which even the closest of human relationships are challenged by the absolute demands of the Kingdom".

== In art ==
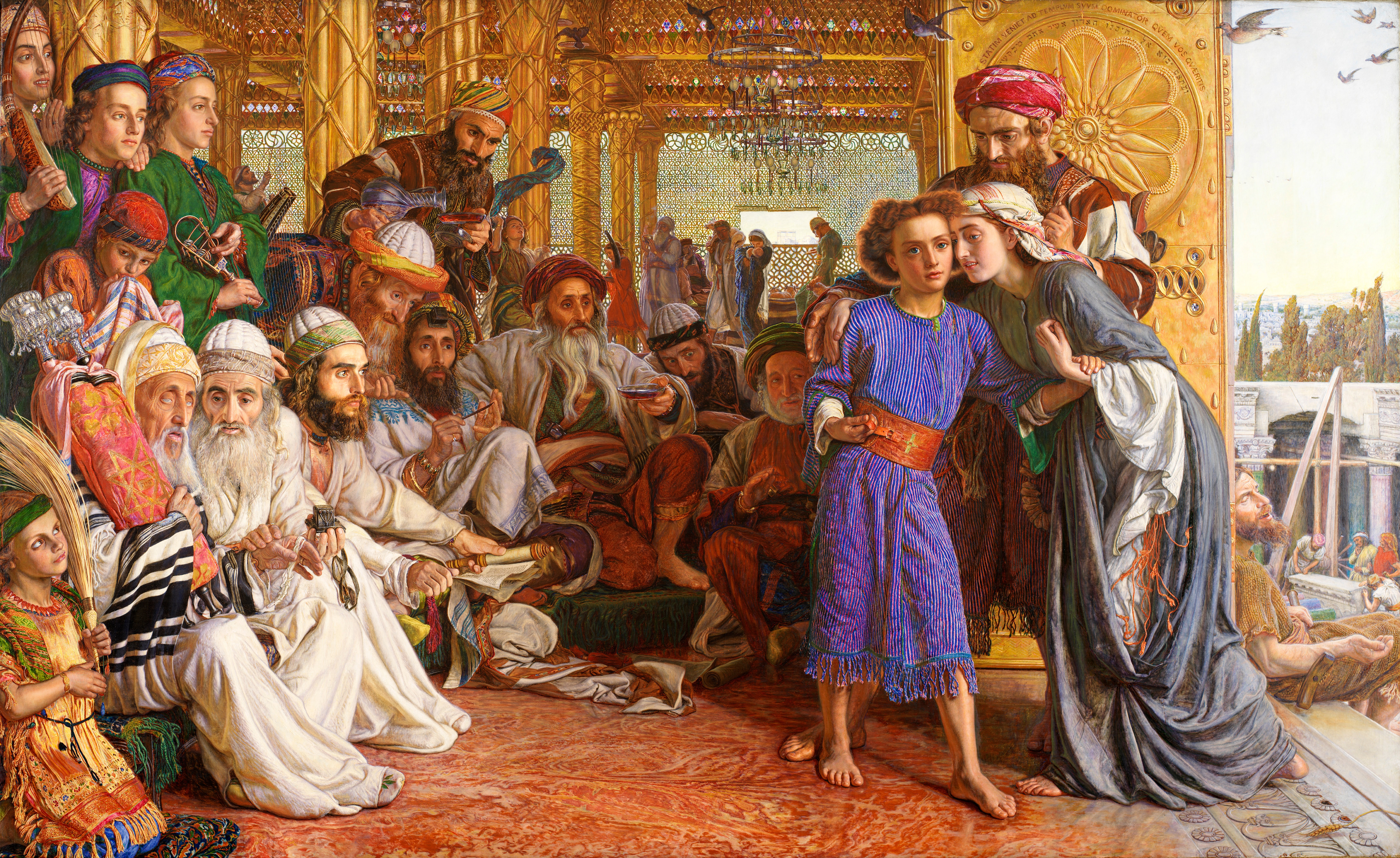
William Holman Hunt, The Finding of the Saviour in the Temple

This event is frequently shown in art, and was a common component in cycles of the Life of the Virgin as well as the Life of Christ. In early Christian depictions, Jesus is usually shown in the center, seated on a raised dais surrounded by the elders, who are often on stepped benches. The gesture usually made by Jesus, pointing to his upraised thumb (illustration), may be a conventional rhetorical gesture expressing the act of expounding text. These depictions derive from classical compositions of professors of philosophy or rhetoric with their students, and are similar to medieval depictions of contemporary university lectures.

This composition can appear until as late as Ingres (Montauban, Musée Ingres ) and beyond. From the Early Medieval period the moment shown is usually assimilated to the finding itself, by the inclusion of, initially, Mary, and later Joseph as well, usually at the left of the scene. Typically, Jesus and the doctors, intent on their discussions, have not noticed them yet. From the 12th century Jesus is often seated in a large throne-like chair, sometimes holding a book or scroll.

In late medieval depictions, the Doctors, often now carrying or consulting large volumes, may be given specifically Jewish features or dress, and are sometimes overtly anti-Semitic caricatures, like some of the figures in Albrecht Dürer's version in the Thyssen-Bornemisza Museum in Madrid. From the High Renaissance onward, many painters showed a "close-up" of the scene, with Jesus closely surrounded by gesticulating scholars, as in Dürer's version of the subject.

Rembrandt, who enjoyed depicting Jewish elders in the Temple in various subjects, made three etchings of the subject (Bartsch 64–66) as well as one of the much more unusual scene of "Christ returning from the Temple with his parents". The Pre-Raphaelite painter William Holman Hunt painted a version called The Finding of the Saviour in the Temple, now at Birmingham, as one of a number of subjects from Jesus's life, for which he travelled to the Holy Land to study local details.

The subject has attracted few artists since the 19th century, and one of the last notable depictions may be the one painted, as a forgery of a Vermeer, by Han van Meegeren in front of the Dutch police, in order to demonstrate that the paintings he had sold to Hermann Göring were also fake.

== Gallery ==
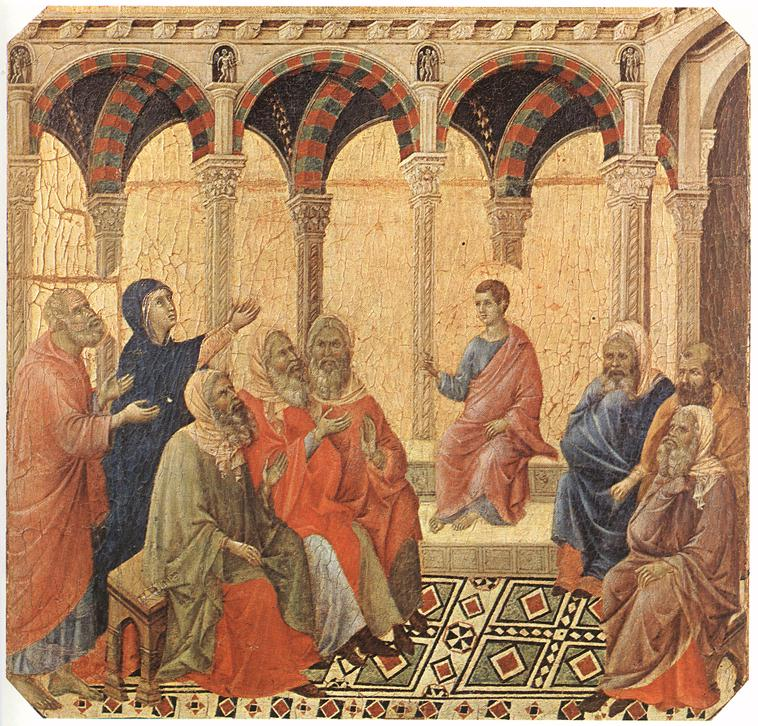
Disputation with the Doctors, Duccio di Buoninsegna, c. 1308–1311, tempera on wood

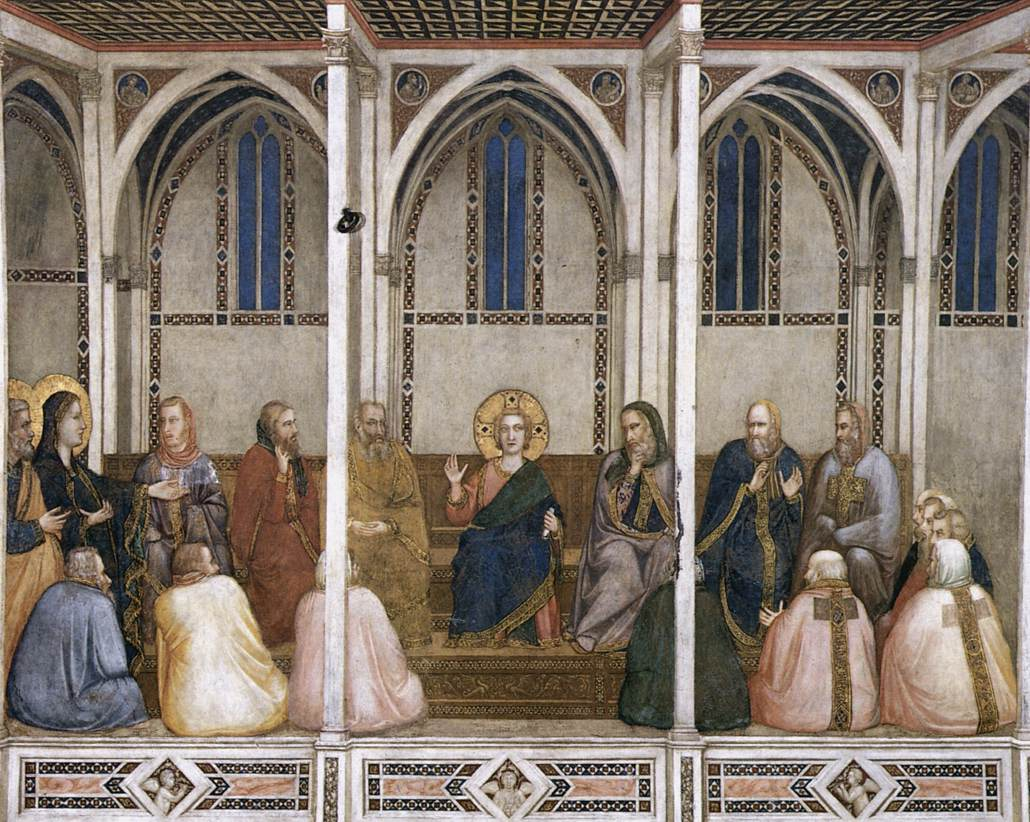
Giotto, Christ Among the Doctors, Lower Basilica of San Francesco, Assisi, 1310s

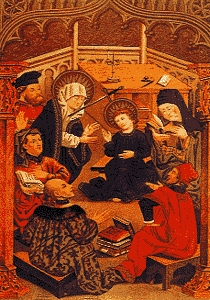
Disputation, 15th ct., Kraków. Note the sword in the heart of Mary.

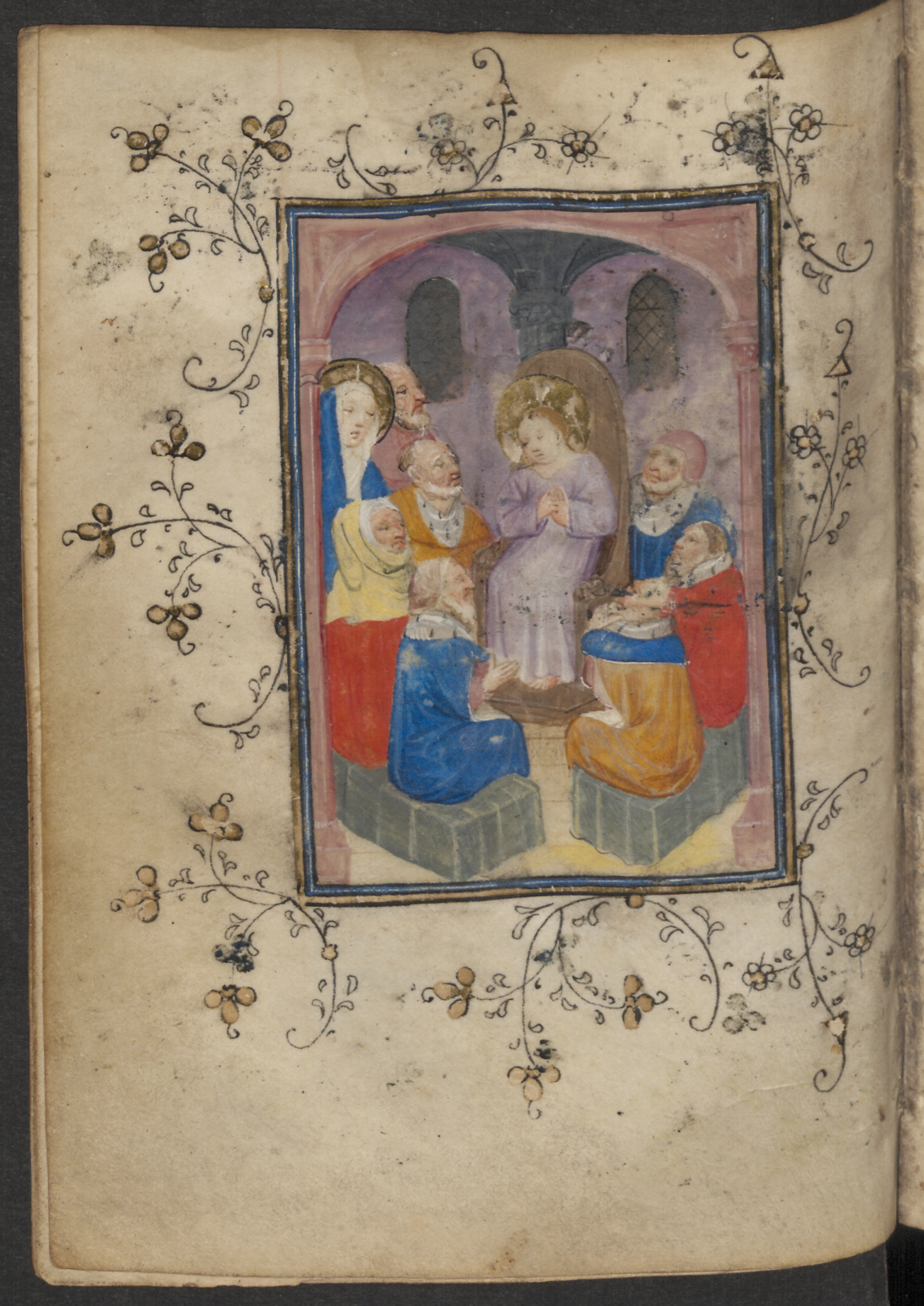
Illumination in a Book of Hours by Dutch Master of Zweder van Culemborg, c. 1420–1440

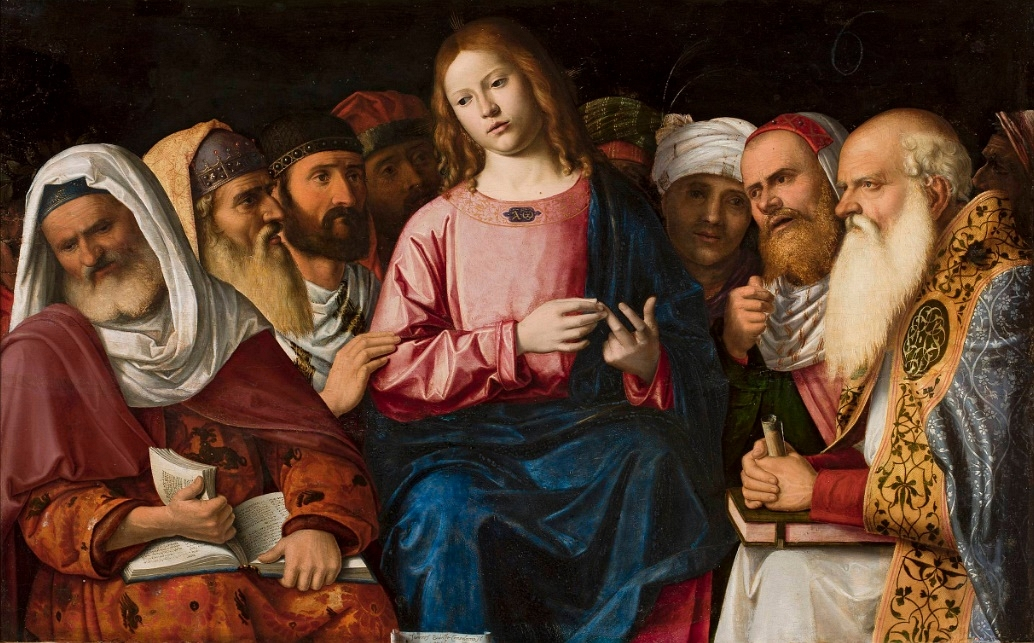
Cima da Conegliano, Christ among the Scholars, c. 1504 (National Museum in Warsaw)

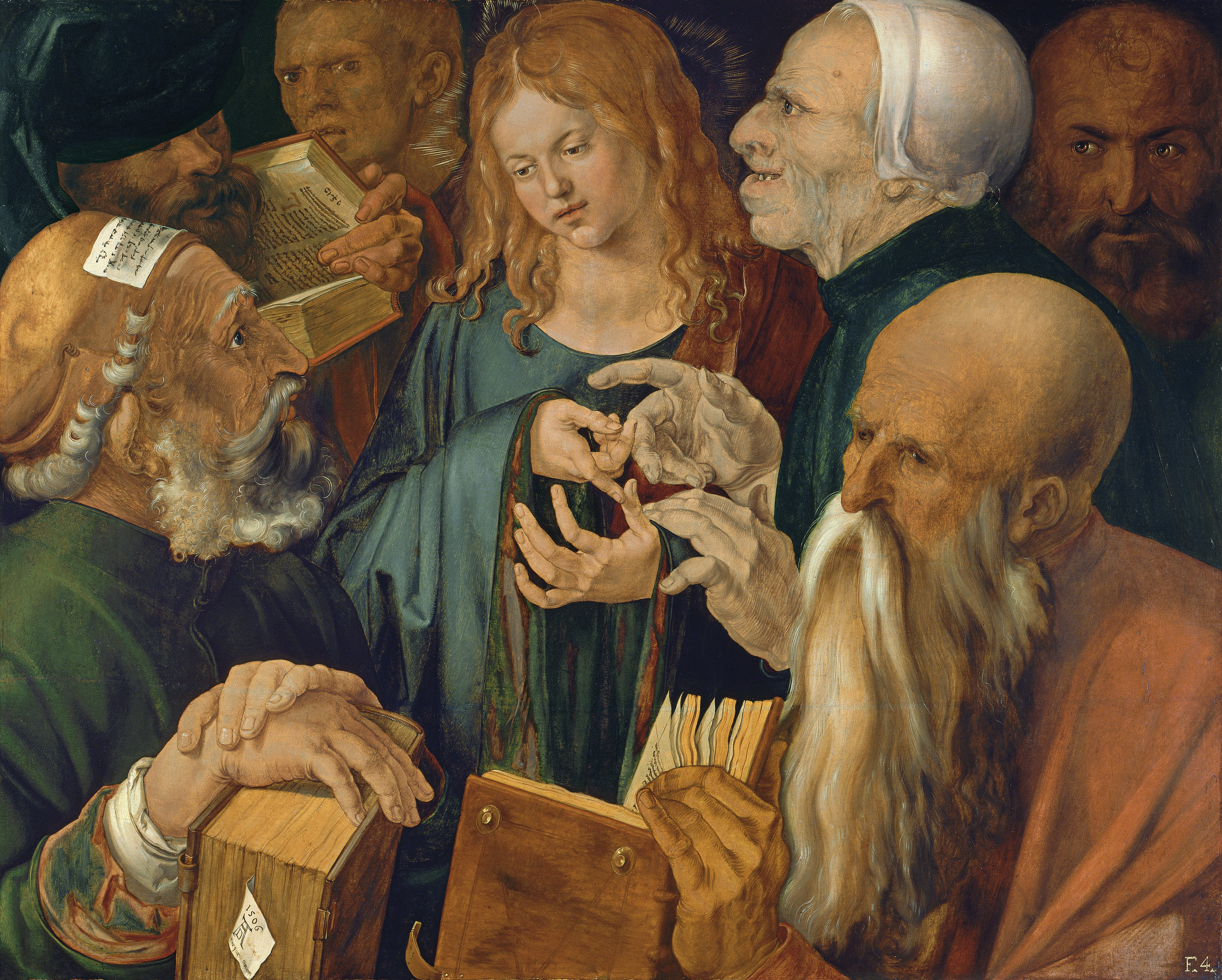
Christ Among the Doctors by Albrecht Dürer, 1506 (Museo Thyssen-Bornemisza, Madrid)

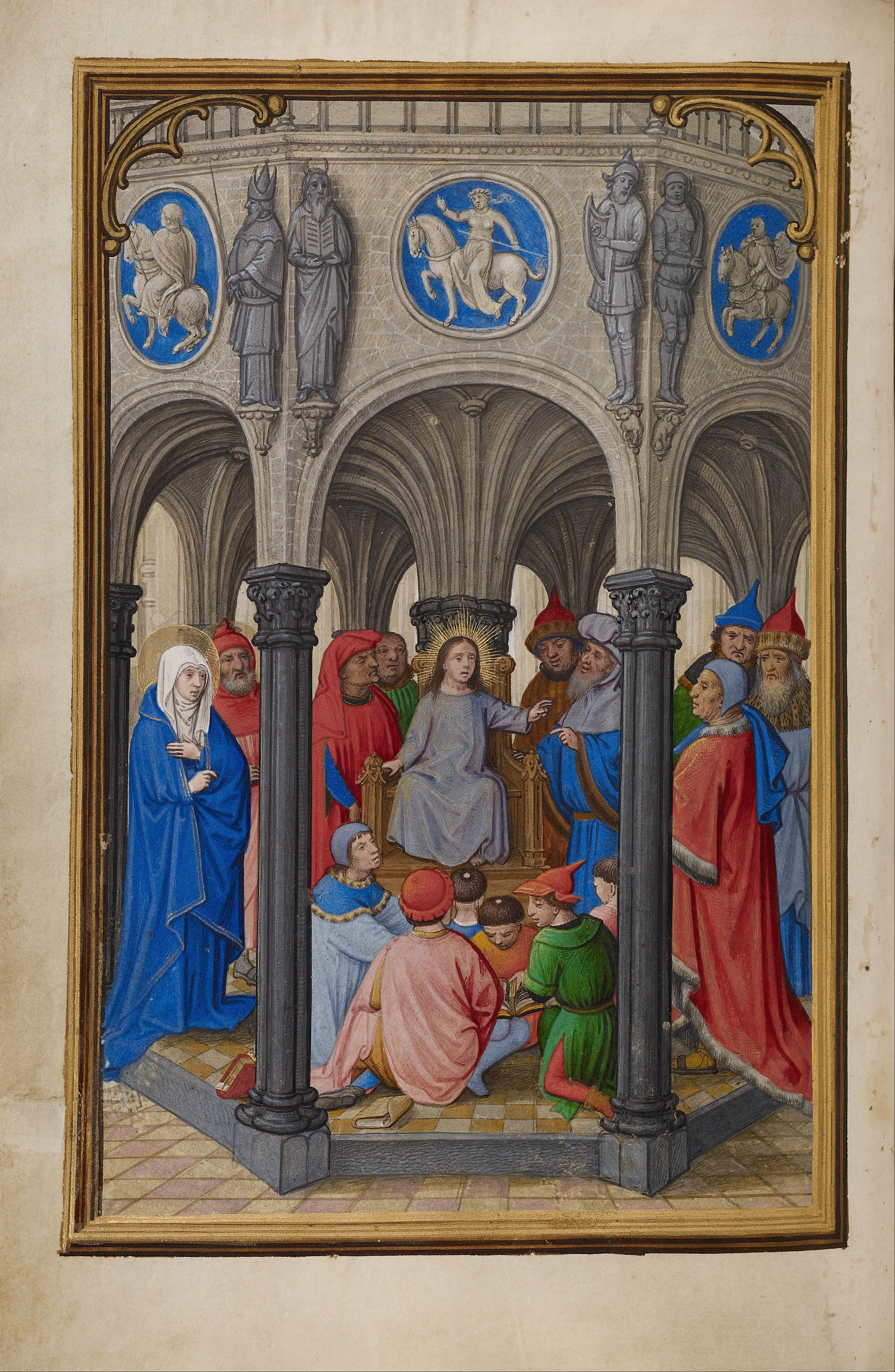
Simon Bening, The Dispute in the Temple, c. 1525–1530

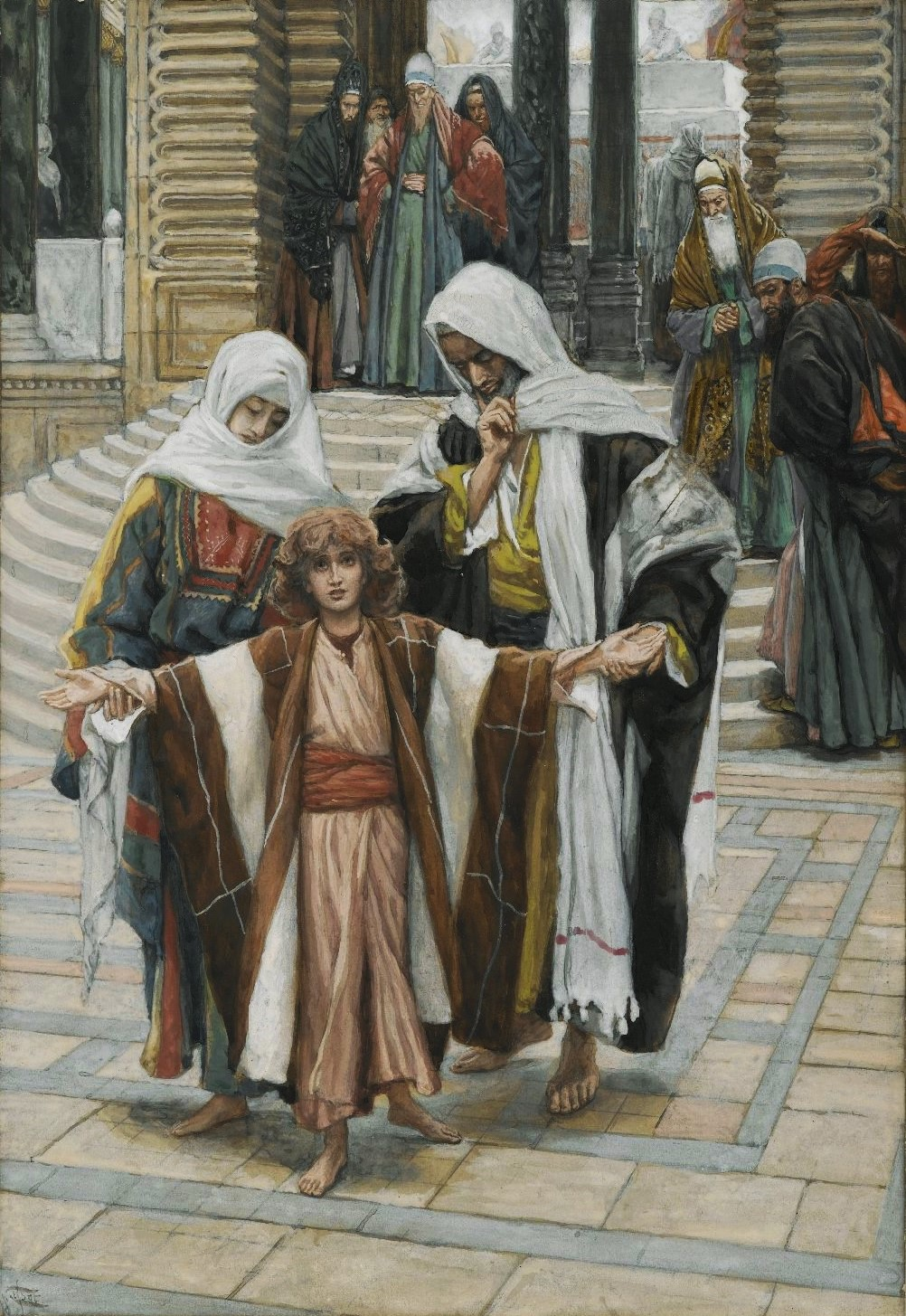
Jesus Found in the Temple (Jesus retrouvé dans le temple) by James Tissot, 19th ct. (Brooklyn Museum, New York)

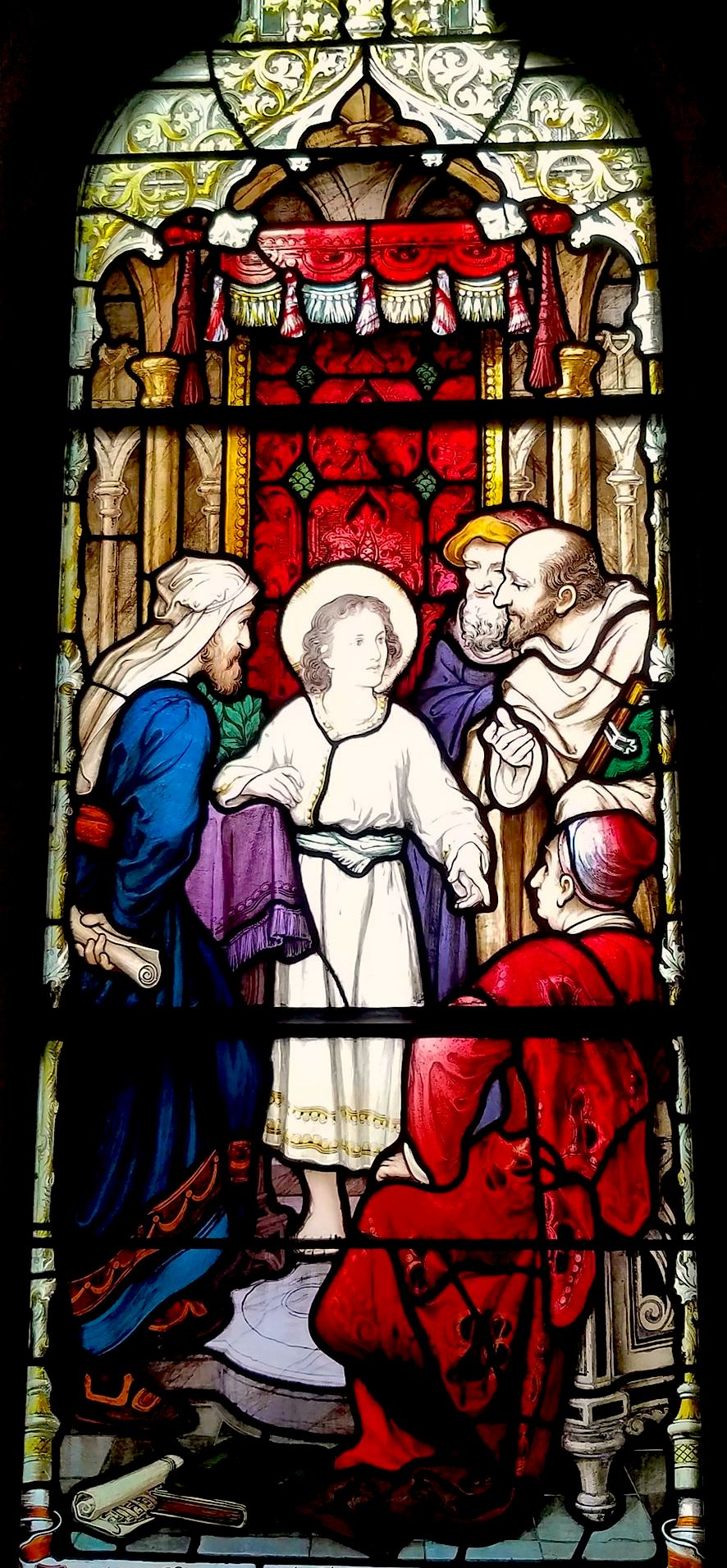
Young Jesus in the Temple, c. 1896 stained glass window, Church of the Good Shepherd, Rosemont, Pennsylvania

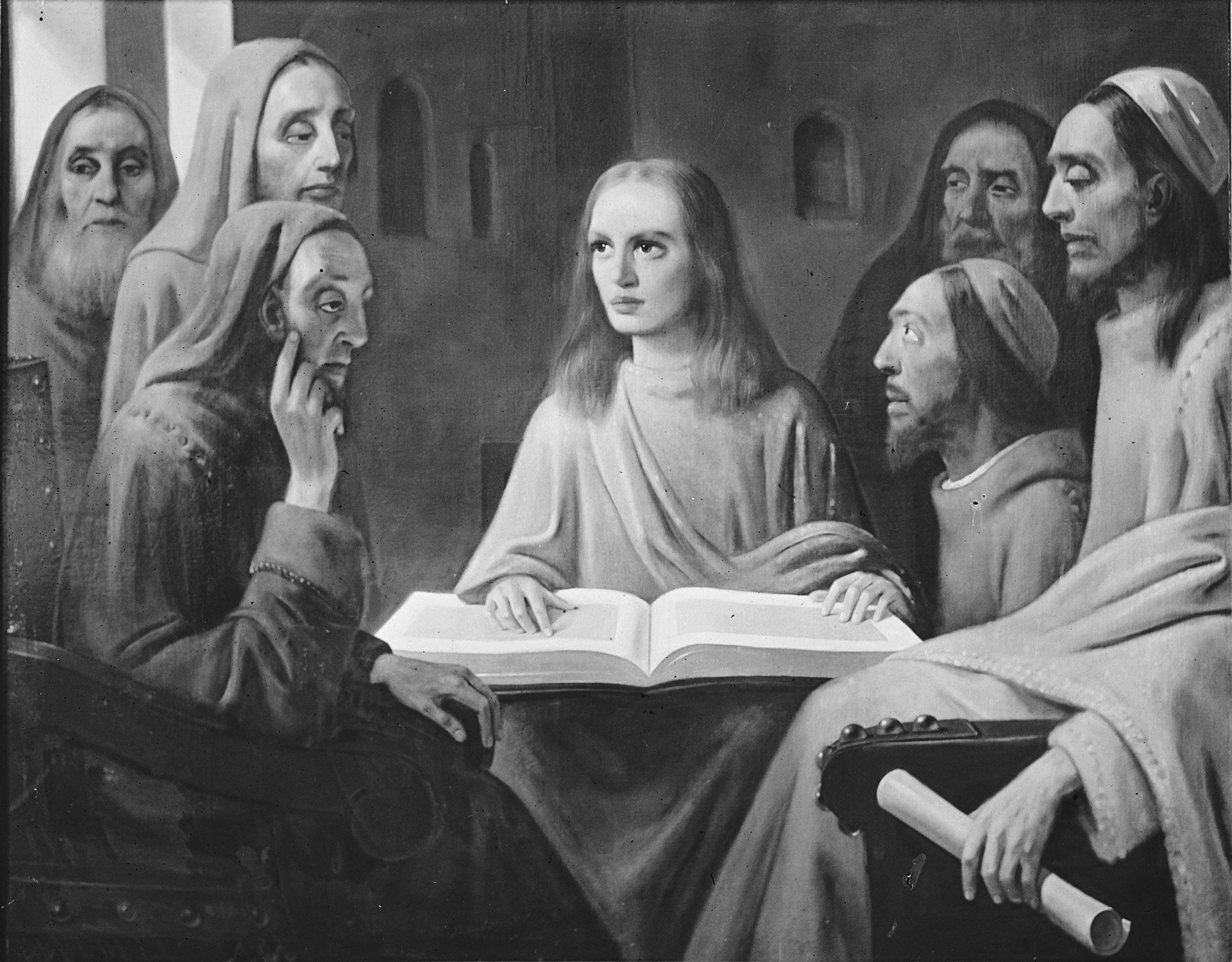
Jesus unter den Schriftgelehrten, or Jesus Among the Scribes, painted in the style of Vermeer by Han van Meegeren to prove to the Dutch Courts he forged a painting that he traded to Hermann Göring for 137 paintings rather than selling an actual Vermeer, which would have been collaboration with Nazi Germany punishable by death

== See also ==
- Seven Sorrows of Mary

== General sources ==
- G. Schiller, Iconography of Christian Art, Vol. I, 1971 (English translation from German), Lund Humphries, London, pp. 124–5 & figs, ISBN 0-85331-270-2
- Friedrich Justus Knecht (1910). "Jesus at the Age of Twelve Years goes to the Temple" . A Practical Commentary on Holy Scripture. B. Herder.

Finding in the Temple Life of Jesus: Ministry
Preceded by Return of young Jesus to Nazareth	New Testament; Events	Succeeded by Pilate made Prefect of Judea, further succeeded by Baptism of Jesus
