= Joachim and Anne Meeting at the Golden Gate =

Christian narrative

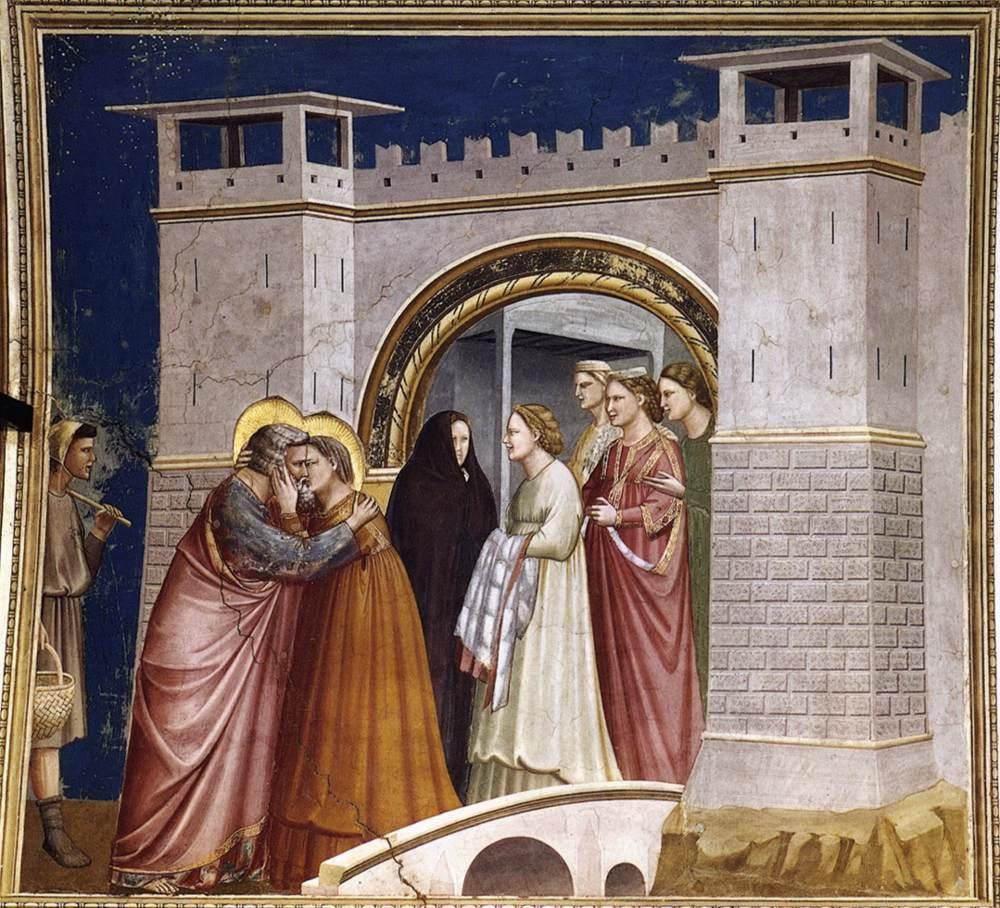
Giotto di Bondone, Legend of St Joachim, Meeting at the Golden Gate, 1305, in the Scrovegni Chapel, is an early Western depiction of the scene.

Joachim and Anne Meeting at the Golden Gate is a narrative of the parents of the Virgin Mary, Joachim and Anne meeting at the Golden Gate of Jerusalem, upon learning that she will bear a child. It is not in the New Testament, but is in the Protoevangelium of James and other apocryphal accounts; the narrative was tolerated by the church. It features in Jacobus de Voragine's Golden Legend (c.1260) and other popular accounts. The story is a popular subject in cycles of the Life of the Virgin in art.

== Story ==
Benedict Chelidonius' work describes the story of the married couple Joachim and Anne, who, though they are devoted to each other, are deeply unhappy as they are childless, which they take as a sign that they must have been rejected by God. An angel informs Anne that she will conceive, while at the same time asking her to meet her husband at the city gate in Jerusalem. On meeting, the couple entwine in joy. According to Chelidonius: "Overjoyed Anne threw herself into the arms of her husband; together they rejoiced about the honour that was to be granted them in the form of a child. For they knew from the heavenly messenger that the child would be a Queen, powerful on heaven and on earth". In traditional depictions of the occasion, the pair embrace, but don't kiss.

== Theological implications ==
This scene represented the conception of Mary, and is an early scene in the many cycles of the Life of the Virgin, the counterpart of the Annunciation showing the conception of Jesus. To some medieval viewers, the kiss was a literal representation of the moment of Mary's conception, while for others it was a symbolic representation. The main figures may be accompanied, usually Anne with women and Joachim with shepherds. The Archangel Gabriel, always shown in Annunciations, may appear here also. Sometimes other saints are included.

The 14th and 15th centuries were the heyday of depictions. In a 1410 French Mass book, Anne and Joachim are depicted in front of a castlelike structure representing the Golden Gate. The image precedes the Mass for the Feast of the Conception of the Virgin Mary. Gradually more allegorical depictions of the Immaculate Conception, featuring an adult Mary, replace this scene in representing the doctrine.

The church had developed the doctrine that the Virgin Mary was, uniquely, conceived without original sin; this is known as the doctrine of the Immaculate Conception (which refers to the conception of Mary, not that of Jesus). In the Middle Ages the doctrine remained controversial, opposed by Dominicans like Thomas Aquinas but supported by Franciscans such as Duns Scotus. Aquinas in the Summa Theologiae affirmed that the Blessed Virgin Mary was conceived by a union of flesh of her parents and therefore incurred in the original sin, but that it was cleansed before her birth. The Immaculate Conception was defined as dogma in 1854, by Pope Pius IX.

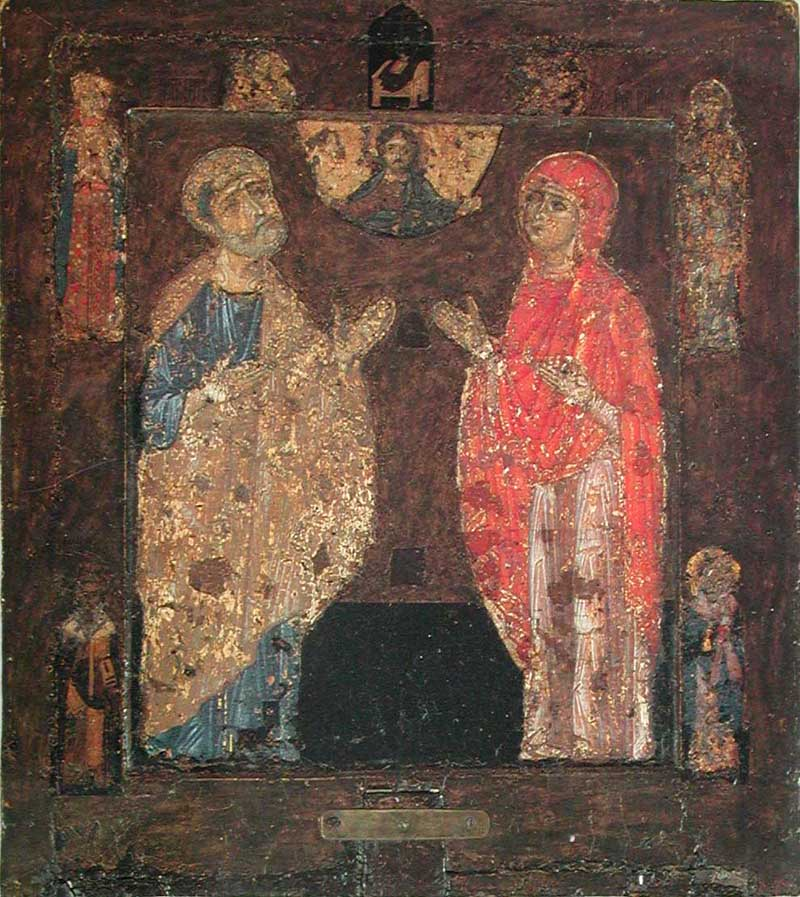
Russian icon, perhaps before 1169

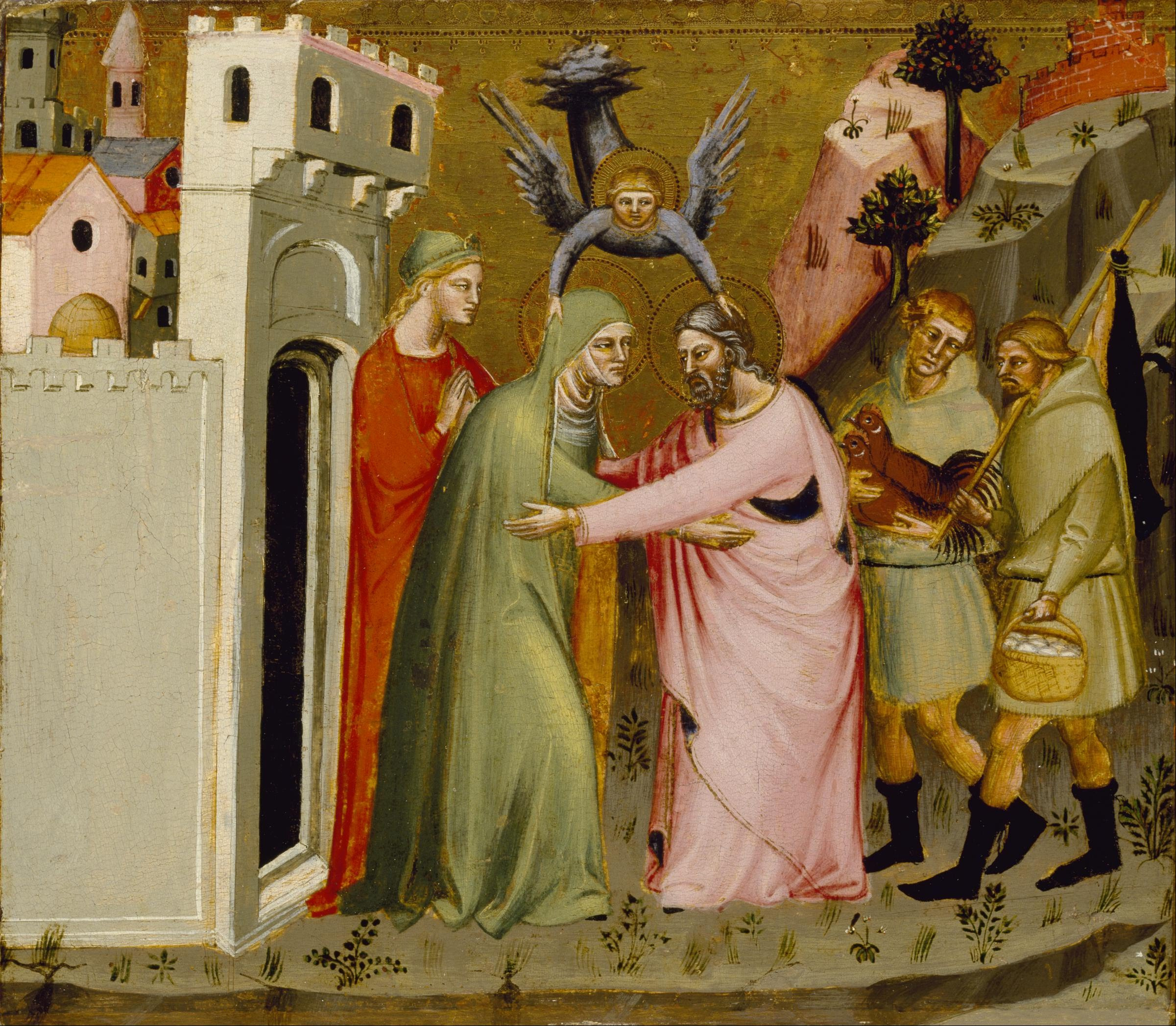
Master of the Golden Gate, late 14th century

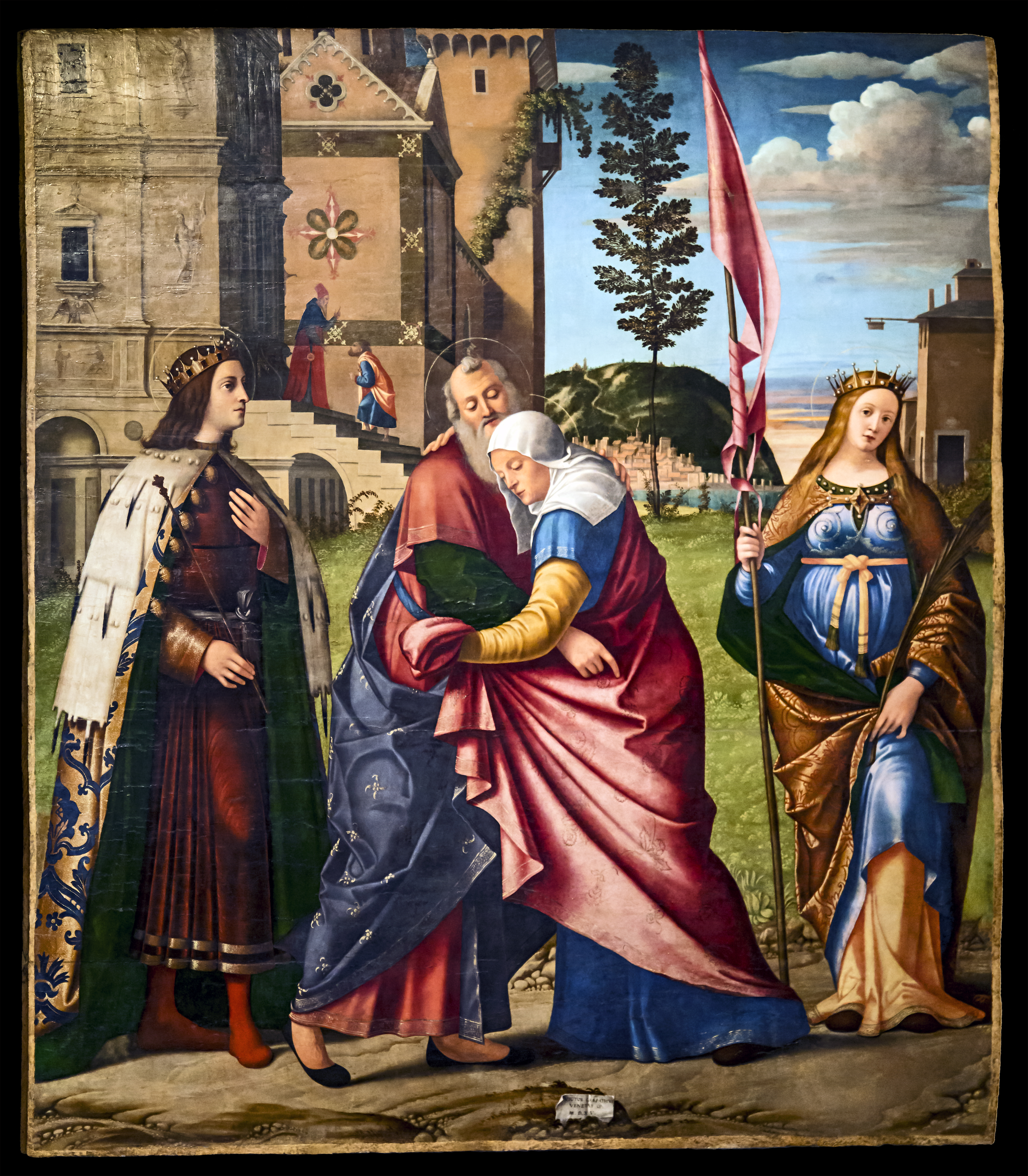
Carpaccio, with Saint Louis IX and Saint Liberata.

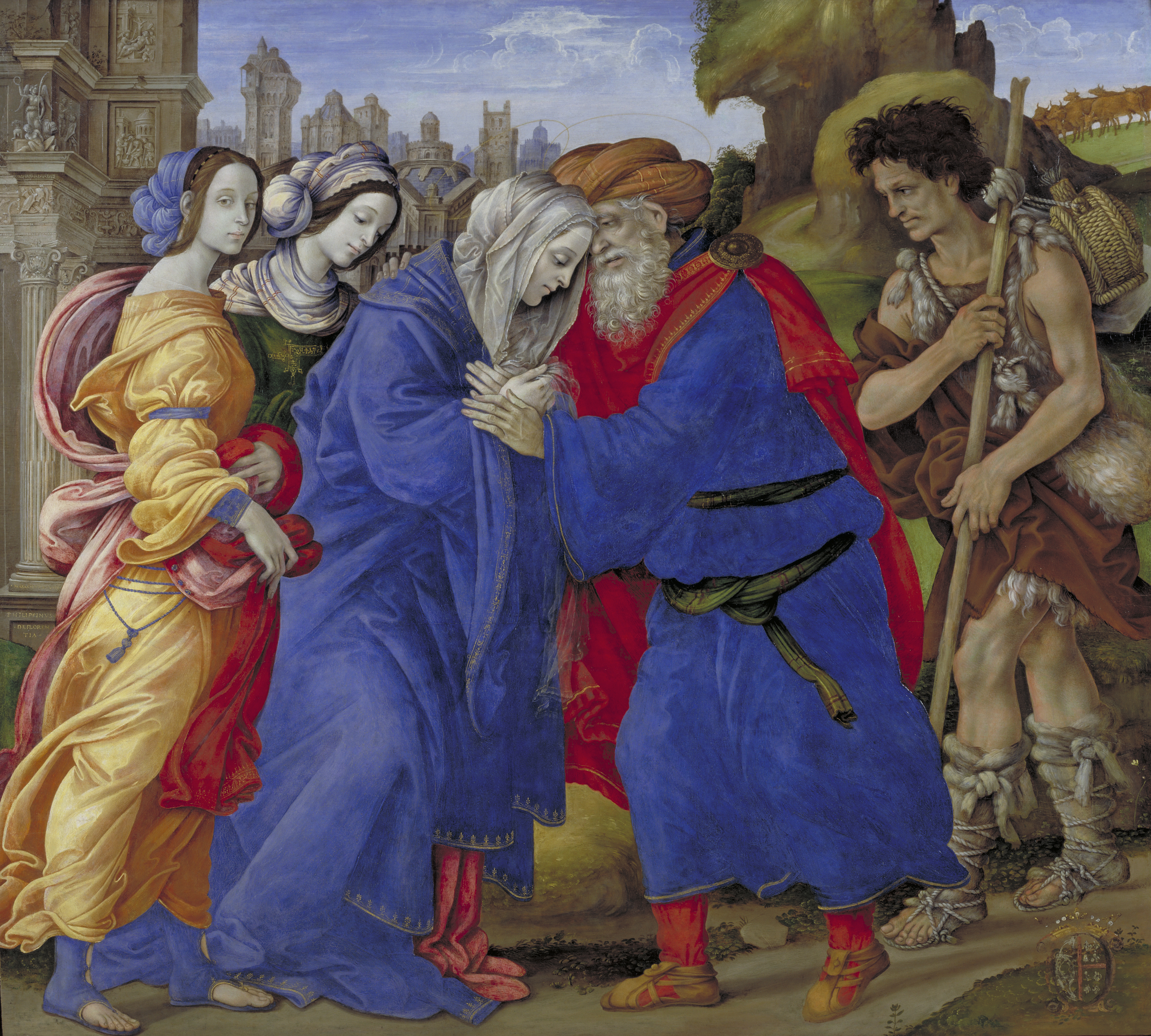
Filippino Lippi, 1497

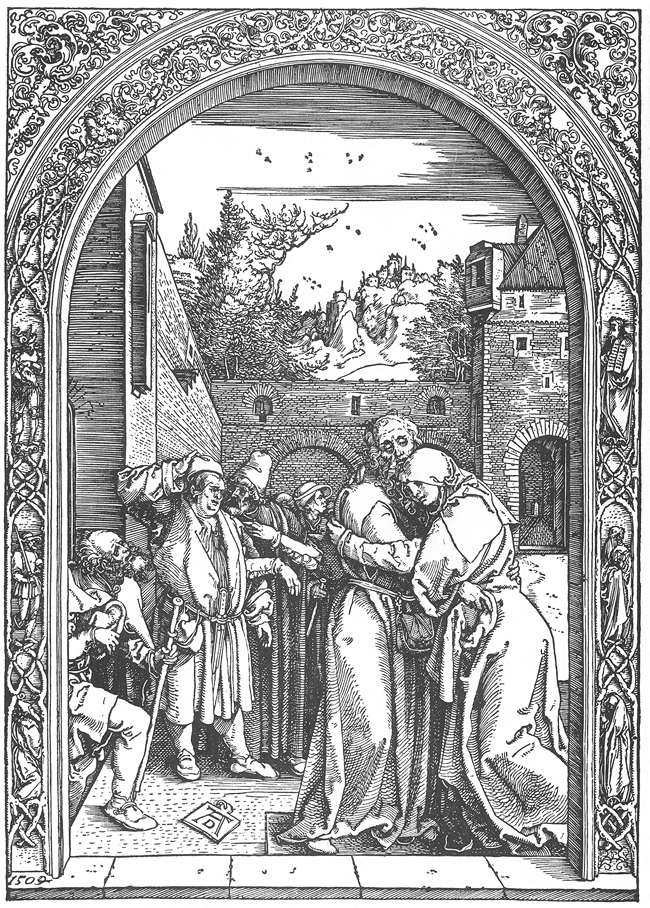
Joachim and Anne Meeting at the Golden Gate, Dürer, 1504

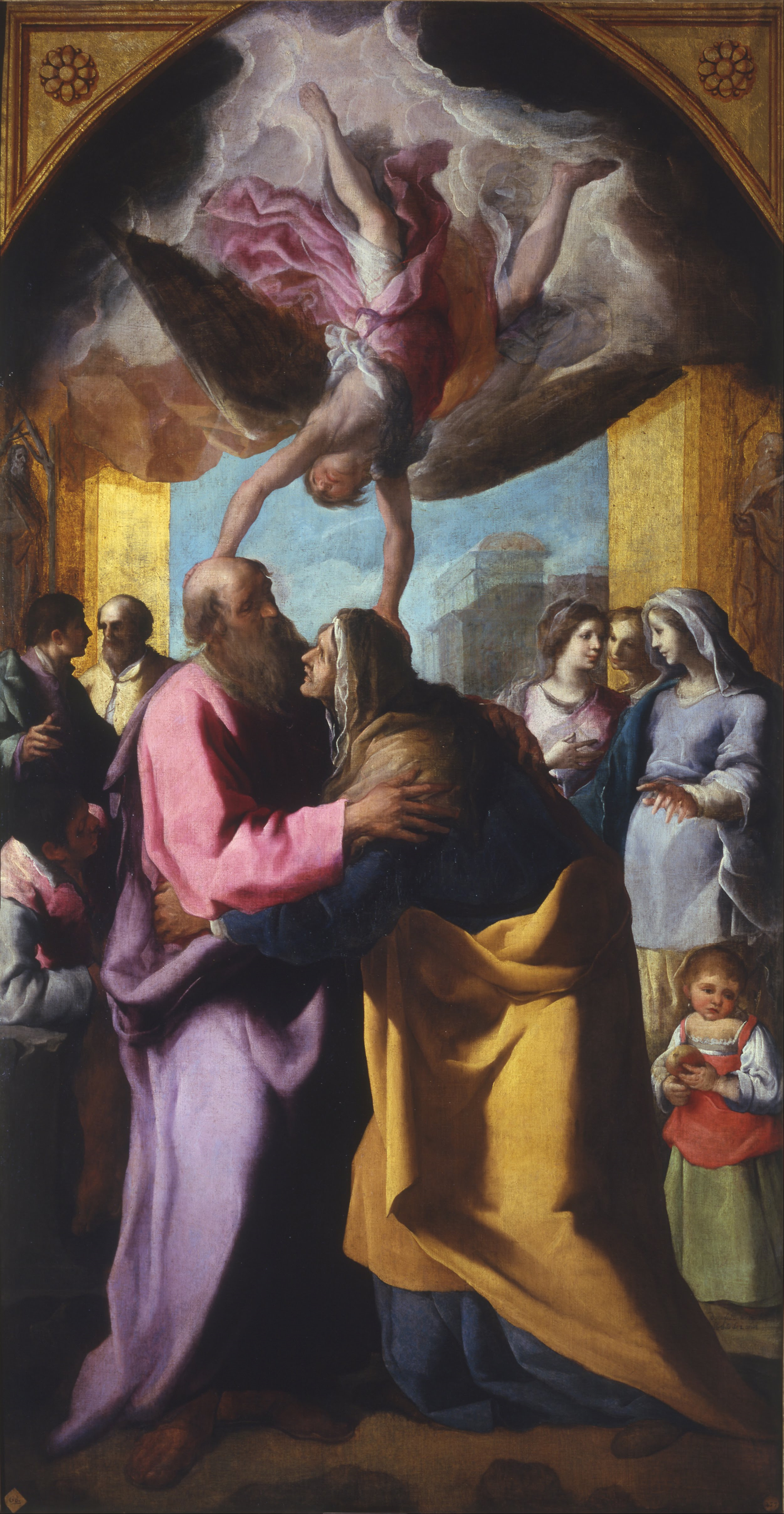
Eugenio Cajés, 1605; by now the scene was becoming less frequent

== Sources ==
- Hall, James, Hall's Dictionary of Subjects and Symbols in Art, 1996 (2nd edn.), John Murray, ISBN 0719541476
- Kurth, Dr. Willi. The complete woodcuts of Albrecht Durer. New York: Arden Book Co, 1935.
- Nurnberg, Verlag Hans Carl. Dürer in Dublin: Engravings and woodcuts of Albrecht Dürer. Chester Beatty Library, 1983.
- Strauss, Walter L. "Albrecht Durer Woodcuts and Woodblocks". The Burlington Magazine, Vol. 124, No. 955, October, 1982. pp. 638–639.
