= Joachim and Anne Meeting at the Golden Gate (Dürer) =

Woodcut by Albrecht Dürer

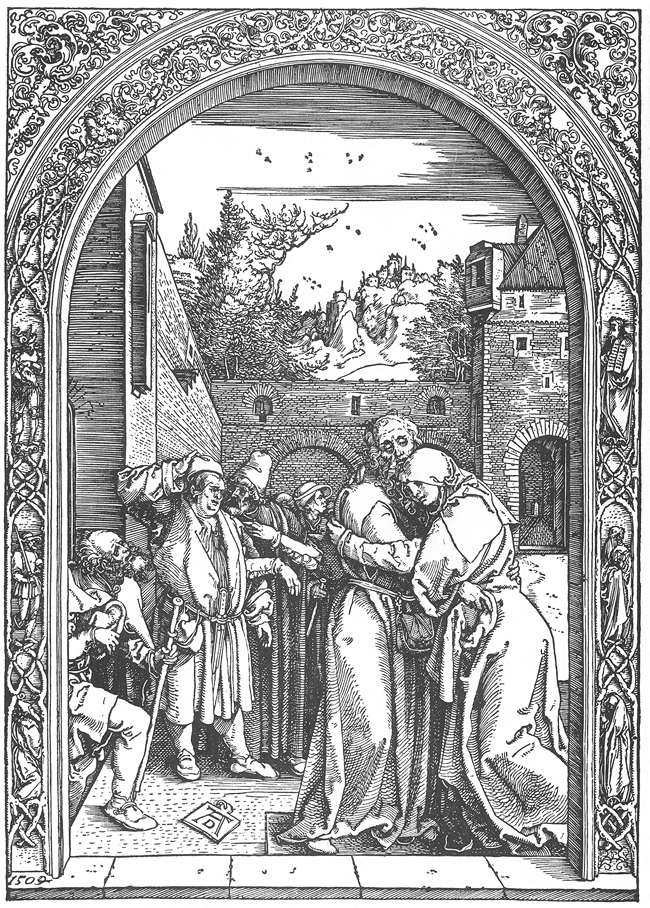
Albrecht Dürer, Joachim and Anne Meeting at the Golden Gate, 1504.

Joachim and Anne Meeting at the Golden Gate is a 1504 woodcut by the German artist Albrecht Dürer that depicts the standard scene of Joachim and Anne Meeting at the Golden Gate. In the woodcut, the parents of the Virgin Mary, Joachim, and Anne meet at the Golden Gate of Jerusalem, upon learning that she will bear a child.

== Description and narrative ==
The work is one of 16 woodcuts in Dürer's Life of the Virgin series, which he executed between 1501 and 1511. Joachim and Anne Meeting at the Golden Gate is the only work in the series to include a date. Throughout the series, the Virgin is displayed as an intermediary between the divine and the earth, yet shown with a range of human frailties. The full series of prints was first published in 1511. Printed on the reverse of each was a Latin text written by a member of his intellectual circle in Nuremberg, the Benedictine Abbot Benedictus Chelidonius.

Dürer here follows an early Renaissance convention involving the illusion of looking through an open window. He framed many of his works in this way, including Joachim and Anne Meeting at the Golden Gate, which is outlined by a Renaissance arch. The artist's mix of classical and sixteenth-century Nuremberg motifs and the northern European setting were utilised to bring the images closer to the audience. According to the critic Laurie Meunier Graves, "these prints manage to illuminate the sacred while at the same time providing scenes of homely, Renaissance life. They are a beautiful blend of the holy and the secular. In addition, woodcuts are an art form that gives plenty of latitude to the imagination and leaves room for fancy." As with the other works in the series, it is distinguished by virtuoso use of line and highly skilled cutting.

== See also ==
- Visitation (Dürer)

== Sources ==
- Hall, James, Hall's Dictionary of Subjects and Symbols in Art, 1996 (2nd edn.), John Murray, ISBN 0719541476
- Kurth, Dr. Willi. "The complete woodcuts of Albrecht Durer". New York: Arden Book Co, 1935.
- Nurnberg, Verlag Hans Carl. "Dürer in Dublin: Engravings and woodcuts of Albrecht Dürer". Chester Beatty Library, 1983.
- Strauss, Walter L. "Albrecht Durer Woodcuts and Woodblocks". The Burlington Magazine, Vol. 124, No. 955, October, 1982. pp. 638–639.
