= Portal sculpture at San Jose Y San Miguel De Aguayo =

Coordinates: 29°21′44.8″N 98°28′48″W

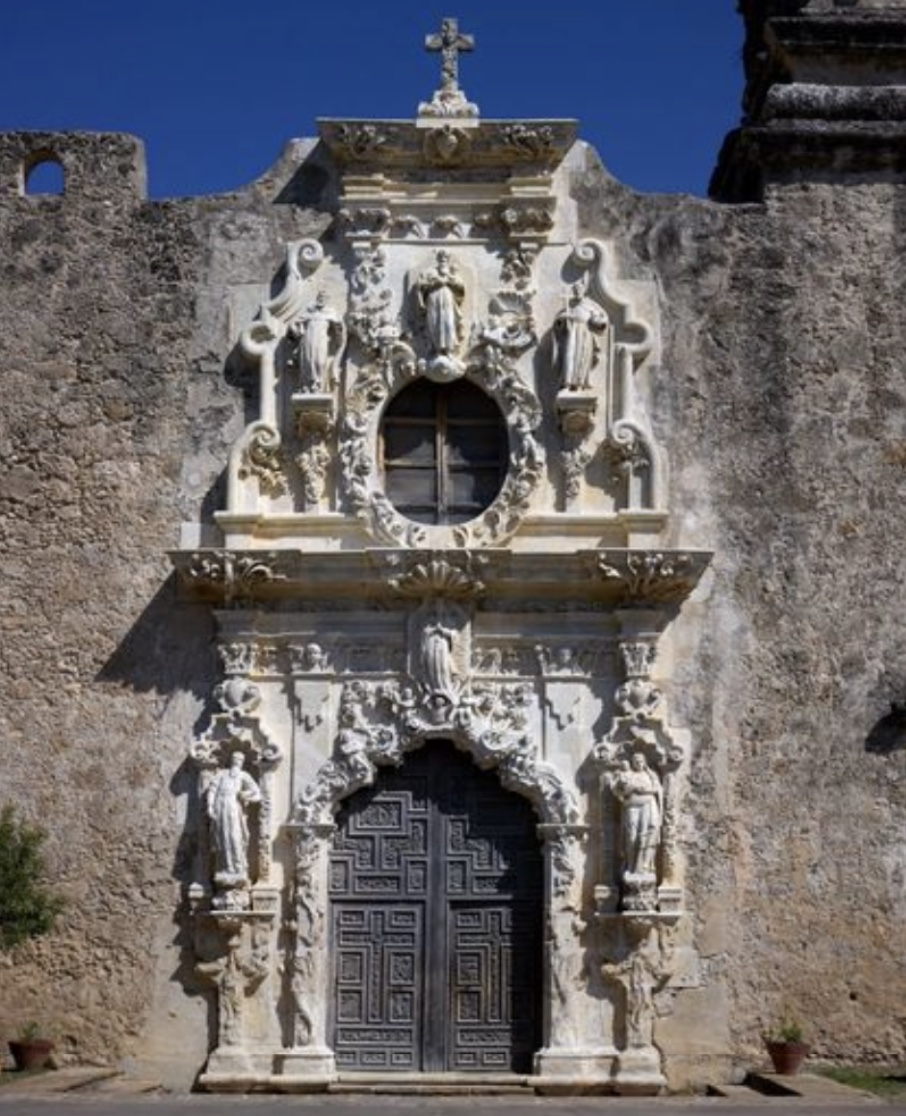
The portal of Mission San Jose y San Miguel de Aguayo, a Spanish mission in San Antonio, Texas.

The Portal Sculpture at San Jose y San Miguel de Aguayo is a façade of the mission's church in San Antonio, Texas. It is covered in saintly figures made by a Mexican-trained sculptor, Pedro Huizar, who carved the figures during 1770–1775. The figures surround an oval window and a portal where the doors of the church are located. The sculptures on the façade were made in high relief and have a spiritual quality of animation. The façade has a Baroque feel and is decorated or embellished with organic sensuous items. Pedro Huizar's style can be linked to styles in Spain where the Catholic Baroque churches existed at the same time. Huizar also had a medieval Gothic taste of style and created the façade with dense figural abundance surrounding the church's portal doors and windows. The statue figures that flank the doorways are Saint Joachim and Saint Anne, the parents of Mary, and Mary can be shown directly above the entrance of the church. The church is dedicated to Saint Joseph, the Virgin's husband. He can be seen above the oval-shaped window.

Pedro Huizar started his sculpture in 1770 and finished in the year 1775. The facade can be seen today in its location in San Antonio, Texas. The church itself is known as “Queen of the Missions” and gets this name from the relief carvings on the façade. The complex detailing of the stonewalls, granary, and bastions was completed in 1782. Over the centuries the church of Mission San Jose has become a lasting symbol for Spanish missions across the Southwest. The Mission San Jose church was not always located where it is today. The church was moved two other times due to the temperamental river nearby, but now the church is a showplace in the southwest. A Franciscan inspector called it “the most beautiful church along the entire frontier of New Spain." Today the church is open to the public and has mass scheduled 7 days a week.
