= Visitation (Dürer) =

Woodcut by Albrecht Dürer

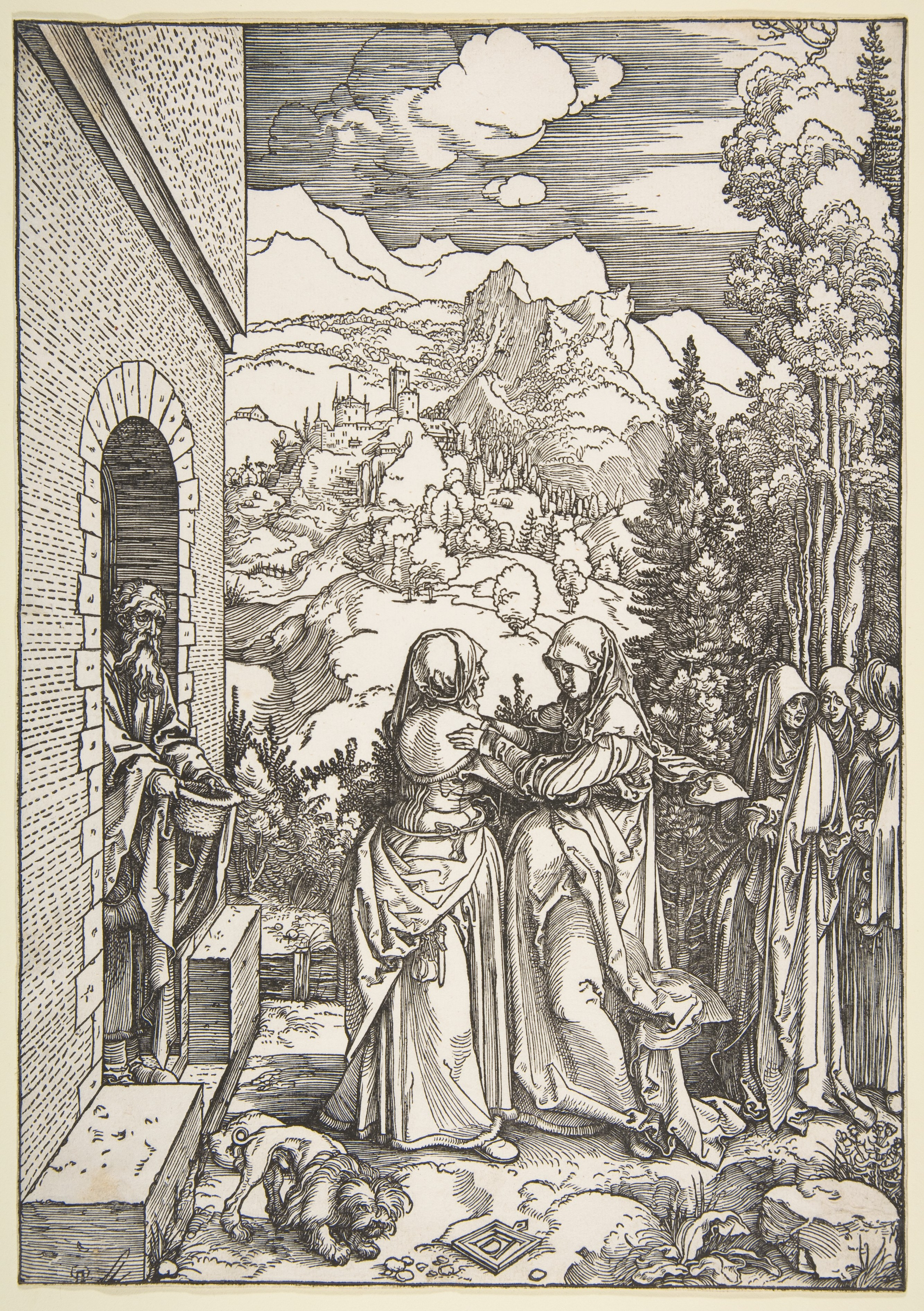
Visitation, Albrecht Dürer, 1503

Visitation is a 1503 woodcut by the German Renaissance artist Albrecht Dürer, from his series on the Life of the Virgin. It depicts the Visitation, an episode in the Gospel of Luke, Luke 1:39–56 when Mary, heavily pregnant, travels to see her much older cousin Elisabeth, who is now also late with child.

The women embrace at the house of Elisabeth's husband Zacharias, who is shown standing at the doorway to the left of the woodcut. Both Zacharias and his wife are old; he is struck into silence by the fact of his long barren wife having finally conceived a child.

The highly detailed landscape shown in the background is likely inspired by the artist's two journeys through the Alps during 1494–95.

== See also ==
- Joachim and Anne Meeting at the Golden Gate (Dürer), another in the series.

== Sources ==
- Nürnberg, Verlag Hans Carl. Dürer in Dublin: Engravings and woodcuts of Albrecht Dürer. Chester Beatty Library, 1983
