= Christ Among the Doctors (Veronese) =

Painting by Paolo Veronese

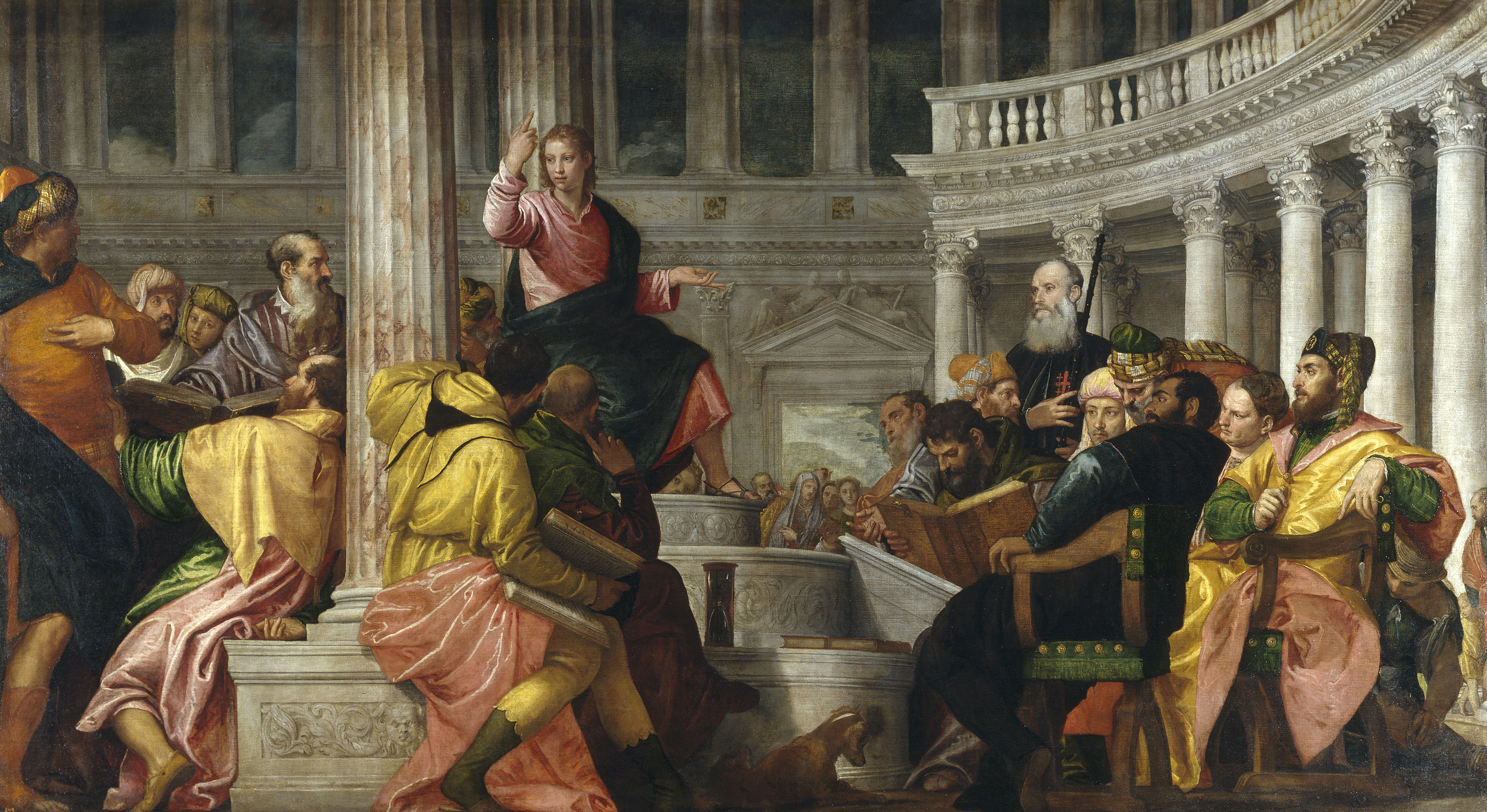
- Artist: Paolo Veronese
- Year: c. 1560
- Medium: oil on canvas
- Dimensions: 236 cm × 430 cm (93 in × 170 in)
- Location: Museo del Prado, Madrid

Christ Among the Doctors is a painting in oils on canvas by Paolo Veronese, now in the Museo del Prado in Madrid. Its dating has been the subject of debate – the date 1548 appears on a book held by a figure seated on the stairs in the foreground, but in 1976 Diana Gisolfi Pechukas posited 1565 as the earliest possible date for the painting's production.

== History and description ==
The work was recorded as being in the Casa Contarini in Padua in 1648, but by 1686 it was in the Real Alcázar di Madrid, having possibly been brought back between 1649 and 1651 by Diego Velázquez after his second trip to Italy. It was later moved to the Buen Retiro Palace.

The painting depicts an episode of biblical history, Christ among the doctors. It is a typical canvas by Veronese showing his preference for large compositions and numerous characters integrated into monumental architecture, as seen – for example – in his Feast in the House of Levi or in The Wedding at Cana. In Christ Among the Doctors twenty-five human figures in different poses and perspectives, dressed in rich clothes, display Veronese's skill in arranging a great variety of colors. The gestural expression of the characters reveals Veronese's study of classical statuary. Relegated to the background, Joseph and Mary, accompanied by the common people, search for their son.

The architectural setting recalls the style of Andrea Palladio, which is one of the arguments invoked in favour of a later creation date as the architectural designs could not be earlier than 1556, the year in which they appeared in an edition of Vitruvius's treatise De architectura.

In this work Veronese follows the typical characteristics of Venetian painting, primarily through his concern for the treatment of light and the harmony of colors. The head of the assembly may be represented by one of the bearded sages, who listens to Christ and wears the black knight's robe of the Order of the Holy Sepulcher and holds a staff of pilgrimage; this could indicate that the painting was commissioned as a reminder of a pilgrimage made to Jerusalem.

== Bibliography ==
- (in Spanish) Palladio 1508.2008, Edita General da Ediciones de Arquitectura, 2008, ISBN 978-84-936203-8-7.
- (in Spanish) Filippo Pedrocco and Terisio Pignatti, Veronés:catálogo completo de pinturas (translated by José Luis Sancho Gaspar y Anselmo), Dedalo, 1993, p. 88, ISBN 978-84-460-0132-4.
