= Life of the Virgin =

Narrative scenes of the life of Mary in art

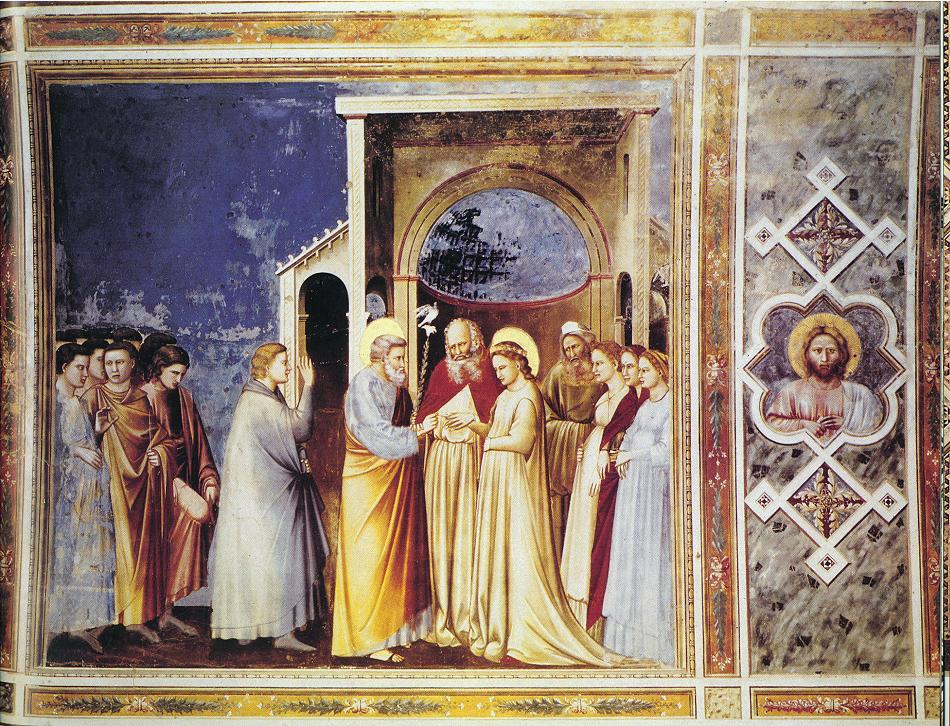
The Marriage of the Virgin by Giotto (Scrovegni Chapel).

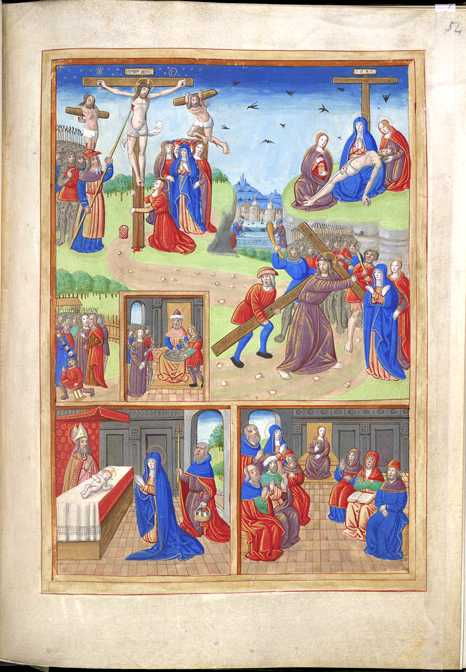
Crucifixion, Descent from the Cross, Lamentation of Christ, Betrayal of Christ, Pilate washing his hands, Christ bearing the Cross, Presentation of Christ in the Temple, Finding in the Temple, from a 15th-century Book of Hours

The Life of the Virgin, showing narrative scenes from the life of Mary, the mother of Jesus, is a common subject for pictorial cycles in Christian art, often complementing, or forming part of, a cycle on the Life of Christ. In both cases the number of scenes shown varies greatly with the space available. Works may be in any medium: frescoed church walls and series of old master prints have many of the fullest cycles, but panel painting, stained glass, illuminated manuscripts, tapestries, stone sculptures and ivory carvings have many examples.

== Scenes shown ==
The Life of the Virgin sometimes merges into a cycle of the Life of Christ, sometimes includes scenes from the Passion of Christ, but often jumps from the childhood of Christ to the Death of the Virgin. The Finding in the Temple, the last episode in the childhood of Christ, often ends the cycle.

Important examples whose scenes are listed in the table below, include those in the Tornabuoni Chapel by Domenico Ghirlandaio and his workshop between 1485 and 1490, the Scrovegni Chapel by Giotto, completed about 1305, and the Maestà by Duccio completed in 1308. The important and extended Late Byzantine mosaic cycle of the Chora Church (early 14th century; see Gallery) shows some differences between East and West – the First seven steps of the Virgin were celebrated by an Orthodox feast day – but the 16 scenes taken to reach a point before the Visitation are similar to the 15 taken in Giotto's near-contemporary cycle. When the Chora cycle resumes, it has become part of the Life of Christ beginning with his Incarnation, as has Giotto's and many Western examples. The Giotto cycle is very full at 26 scenes, but in a small ivory only two scenes may be shown. The commonest pair in such a case is the Annunciation and the Nativity of Jesus, although there were times when the Coronation of the Virgin might displace one of these.

The Tornabuoni Chapel has nine scenes (described more fully at that article). In this case, as very often, other scenes, such as the Visitation, including Mary are contained in the complementary cycle of the Life of St John the Baptist on the walls. A Life of Christ has many more scenes that overlap with the Life of Mary, as the Scrovegni Chapel demonstrates. Albrecht Dürer produced a highly popular and influential series of 19 scenes in woodcut.

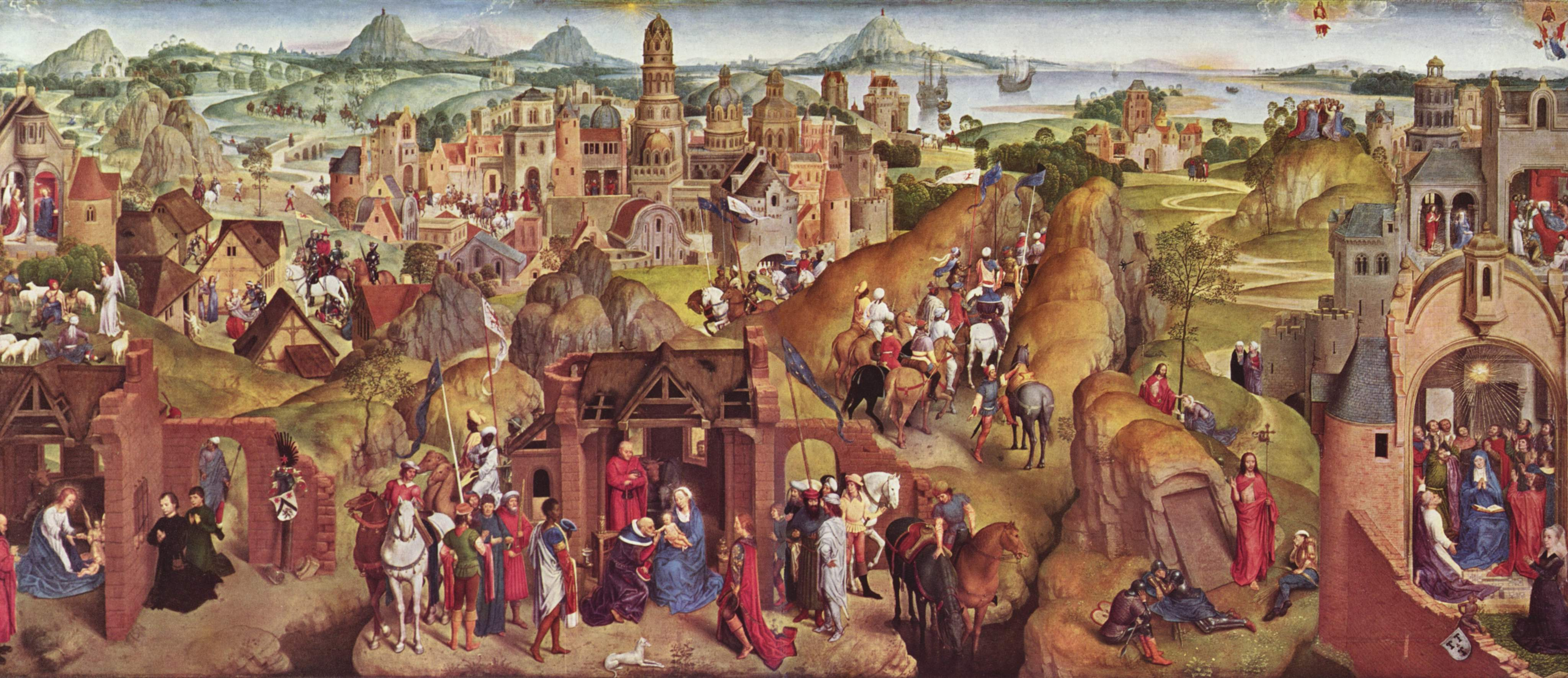
Hans Memling's so-called Seven Joys of the Virgin. In fact this is a later title for a Life of the Virgin cycle on a single panel. Altogether 25 scenes, not all involving the Virgin, are depicted. 1480, Alte Pinakothek, Munich

The total number of scenes was potentially very large up to the early Gothic period; Jacqueline Lafontaine-Dosogne, a leading authority, lists a total of 53 scenes before the Annunciation alone that occur in the art of the West, although only a single example (a 13th-century illuminated manuscript from Germany) containing all of these survives, and very possibly few others ever existed. Seventeen of these scenes preceded the Birth of the Virgin. These apocryphal scenes became much more restricted in the later Middle Ages.

Certain events from the Life were celebrated as feasts by the Church, and others were not; this greatly affected the frequency with which they were depicted. Other Marian devotional practices affected the length and composition of cycles; Books of Hours often had eight scenes to go with the eight sections of the text of the Hours of the Virgin. The Seven Sorrows of the Virgin, the Seven Joys of the Virgin and the 15 decades of the Rosary also influenced selection of scenes, for example in the standardised illustrations for the Speculum Humanae Salvationis. Theological developments also influenced selection, especially those concerning the Death of the Virgin and the Assumption, with the latter gradually replacing the former in the West.

== Table of scenes ==
The table below shows whether a scene was the subject of a feast-day in the Western church, and gives the contents of the cycles (described above and below) by: Giotto in the Scrovegni Chapel, a typical Book of hours, the Hours of Catherine of Cleves, the cycle of the "Master of the Louvre Life of the Virgin", Ghirlandajo's Tornabuoni Chapel cycle, and the print cycles of Israhel van Meckenem and Albrecht Dürer.

Scene	Feast?	Giotto	Bk of Hrs	C of C	Louvre	Ghirla.	Israhel	Dürer
Expulsion of/Annunciation to Joachim		Both		Ann	Ann	Exp	Exp	Both
Joachim and Anne Meeting at the Golden Gate	Yes	Yes		Yes				Yes
Nativity of Mary	Yes	Yes		Yes	Yes	Yes	Yes	Yes
Presentation of Mary	Yes	Yes		Yes	Two		Yes	Yes
Marriage of the Virgin		Yes		Yes	Yes	Yes	Yes	Yes
Annunciation	Yes	Yes	Yes	Yes	Missing?	Yes	Yes	Yes
Visitation	Yes	Yes	Yes	Yes	Yes			Yes
Nativity of Jesus	Yes	Combined	Yes	Combined	Yes		Combined	Combined
Announcement to the Shepherds	Yes	Combined	Yes	Combined			Combined	Combined
Adoration of the Magi	Yes	Yes	Yes			Yes	Yes	Yes
Circumcision of Christ	Yes				Yes			Yes
Presentation of Jesus at the Temple	Yes	Yes	Yes		Yes	Yes	Yes	Yes
Flight into Egypt		Yes	Yes, and/or alternative	Yes	Yes			Yes, plus Rest
Massacre of the Innocents	Yes	Yes	Yes, and/or alternative			Yes	Yes	
Finding in the Temple		Yes			Yes		Yes	Yes
Christ taking leave of his Mother								Yes
Crucifixion of Jesus	Yes	Yes						
Ascension of Jesus	Yes	Yes						
Pentecost	Yes	Yes						
Death of the Virgin	Yes			Yes		Combined		Yes
Assumption of Mary	Yes			Yes		Combined		Yes
Coronation of the Virgin			Yes			Yes	Yes	
Other		Many		4	1			1
Total	16	17+	8	15	12	9	11	19

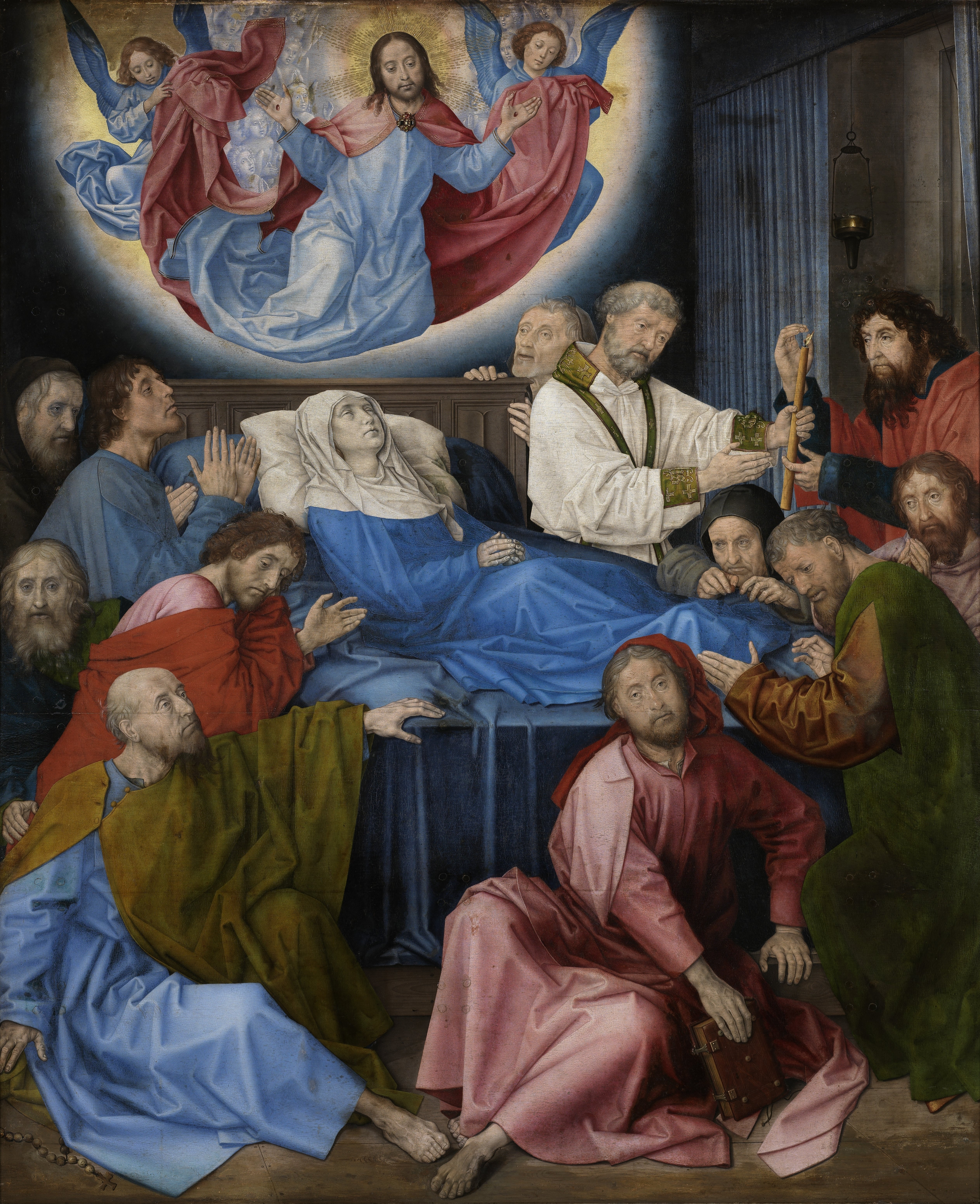
Death of the Virgin, Hugo van der Goes, ca. 1480

The sample above is correct in suggesting that the Annunciation and the Nativity were the only indispensable scenes; the Louvre cycle probably came from an altarpiece with a missing Annunciation as its main panel. The Nativity is always represented, but this may be done by the Nativity itself, the Adoration of the Shepherds, or the Adoration of the Magi – or by a combination of these three. Although the eight scenes for Books of Hours were the standard selection, followed for example by the two examples described by Robert Calkins, it will be noticed that the much longer cycle in the "Hours of Catherine of Cleves" only overlaps with the standard scheme for three scenes. Ghirlandajo has large rectangular spaces to fill, and avoids scenes with only a few participants (and with no opportunity for showy costumes), except for the Annunciation. Christ taking leave of his Mother was a subject new in the 14th century, and only popular from the 15th.

== History ==
The depiction of scenes from the life of the Virgin goes back to almost the earliest days of Christian art; a scene from the church at Dura Europas of about 250 has been interpreted as a procession of Virgins accompanying Mary to the Temple. Early cycles tend to include more scenes and details from the apocryphal Gospels, including the story of Mary's parents, Saint Anne and Joachim, before her birth. The influence of these stories never disappeared entirely, partly because the canonical Gospels give few details of Mary's life before and after the years around the birth of Jesus. In the West the Pseudo-Matthew was the dominant apocryphal source; in the East, slightly different versions, all equally deriving from the Protoevangelium of James, were preferred.

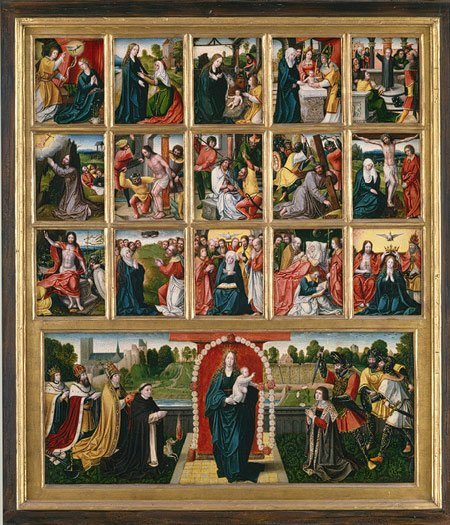
The Fifteen Mysteries of the Rosary and the Virgin of the Rosary, a Rosary-based cycle.

Cycles of the Life of Mary were less frequent in the West than the East until the Gothic period. The cycle of the Nativity in the tympanum of the right portal of Chartres Cathedral is the earliest Western monumental cycle to appear under a large enthroned Virgin and Child. Such cycles continued to appear in prominent positions, gradually becoming less common than scenes of the Passion of Christ. The evolution during the 13th century of the illuminated Book of hours gave another important location for cycles, as did the gradual development of more sophisticated altarpieces for the Lady Chapel, or at least a side-altar, which all large churches had.

With the arrival of the old master print, series of the Life were popular, and were often among the most ambitious works of printmaking artists. Martin Schongauer's Death of the Virgin was one of his most influential works, adapted into painting by a host of artists in Germany and beyond. Schongauer apparently planned a large series, but only four scenes were produced (ca 1470–75). Israhel van Meckenem's series of 12 scenes (ca 1490–1500) and Francesco Rosselli's series, which followed the subjects of the Mysteries of the Rosary, were the most important other 15th century examples. Dürer largely eclipsed these at the beginning of the 16th century with his cycle of 19 woodcuts on the Life of the Virgin (c. 1501-11) essentially following Schongauer's composition in his scene of the Death.

With the decline of the illuminated manuscript and the advent of larger paintings and the single-subject altarpiece, cycles became less important in art, except in print form, but painted cycles by no means died out. A cycle of 16 fairly large paintings by Luca Giordano of about 1688 hung in the Queen of Spain's bedroom in Madrid in the 18th century, and many cycles were painted for cathedrals and other large buildings. After the decrees of the Council of Trent in 1563, many of the apocryphal scenes, and late medieval introductions like the Swoon of the Virgin, were attacked by writers like Molanus and Cardinal Federigo Borromeo.

== Gallery ==
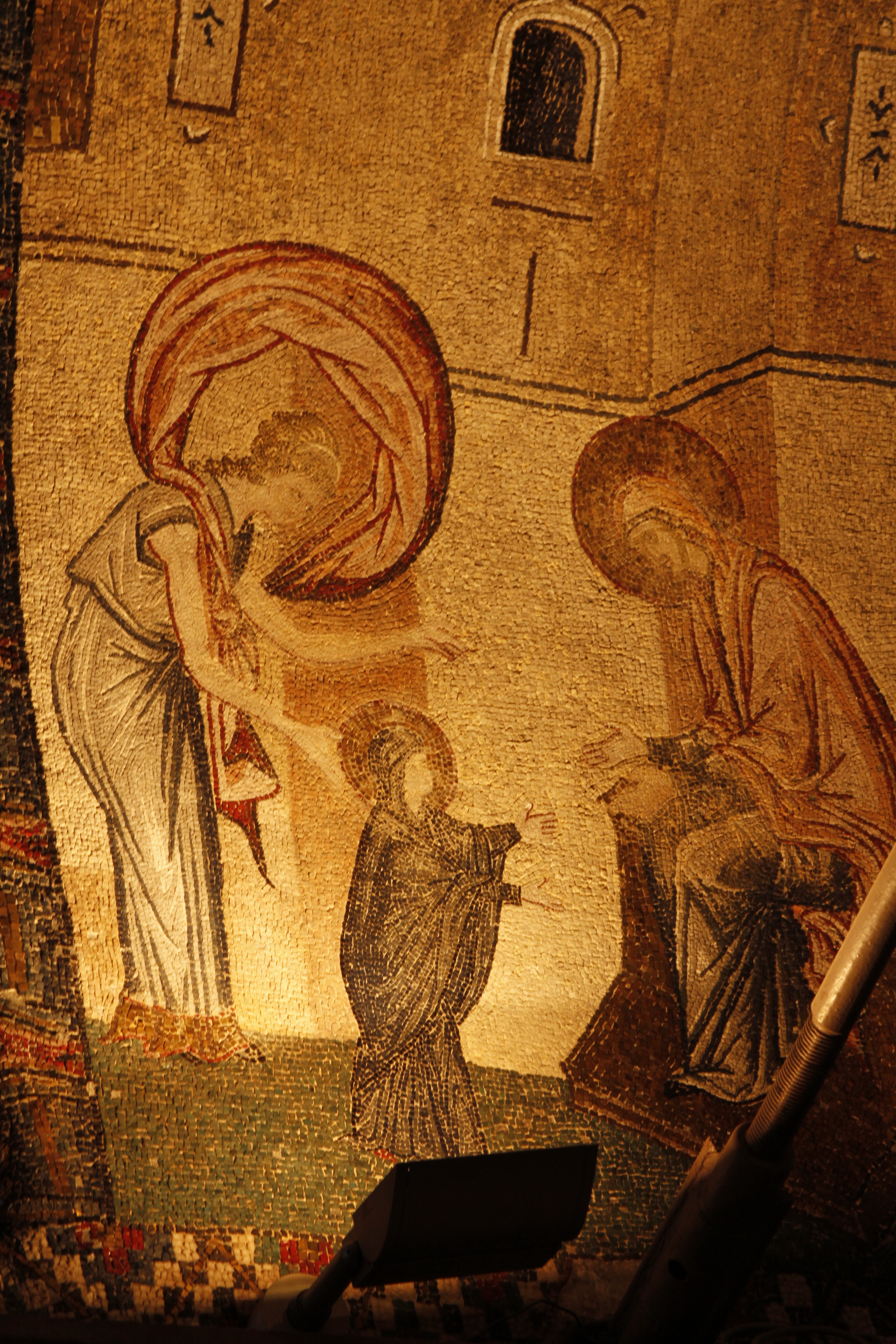
The first steps of the Virgin, a common Byzantine subject, rarely seen in the West. Mosaics from the Chora Church of Constantinople, 1315-21.

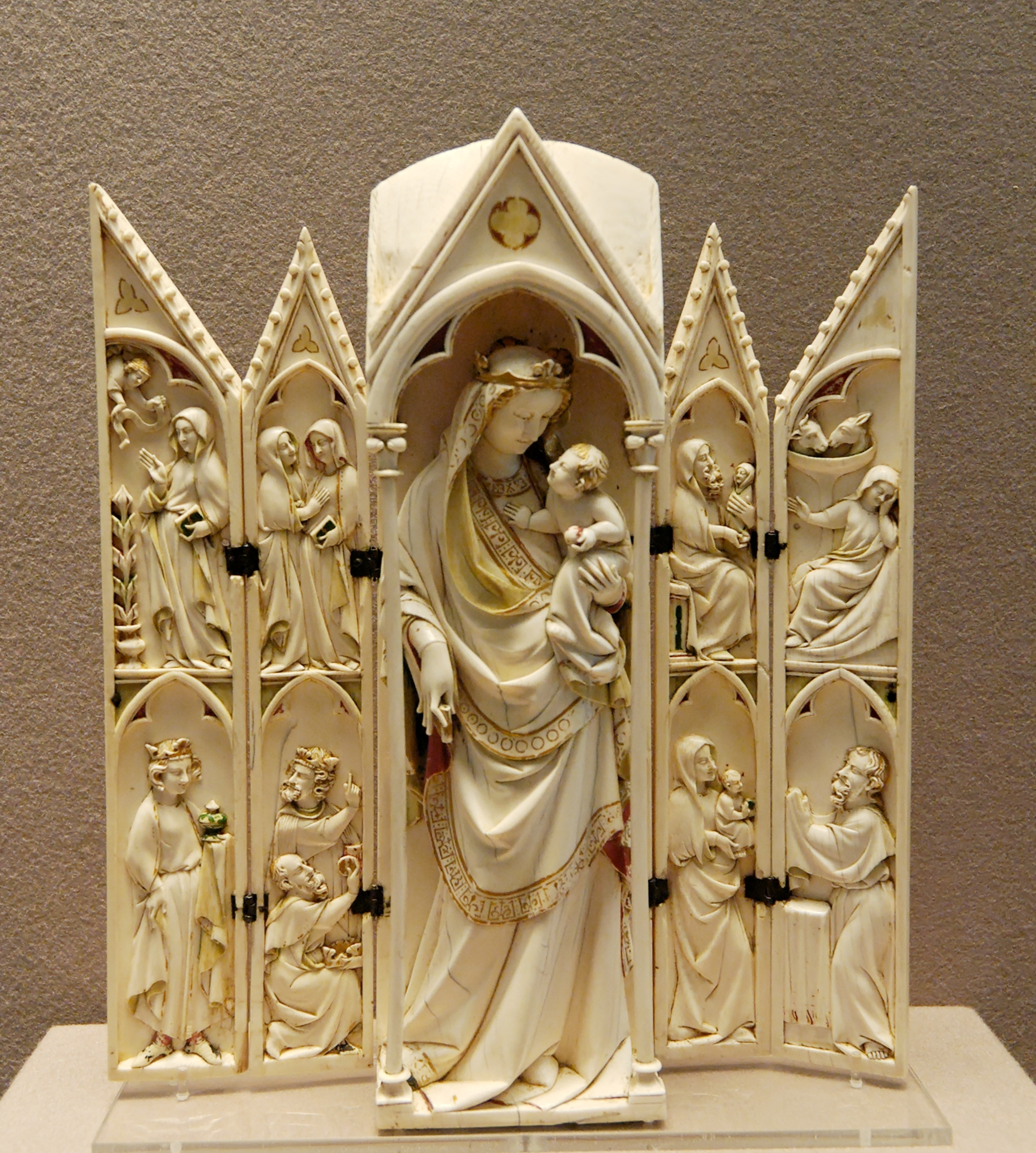
14th-century French ivory triptych showing the Annunciation, Visitation, Adoration of the Magi, Nativity (with Joseph holding the baby while Mary sleeps), Presentation.

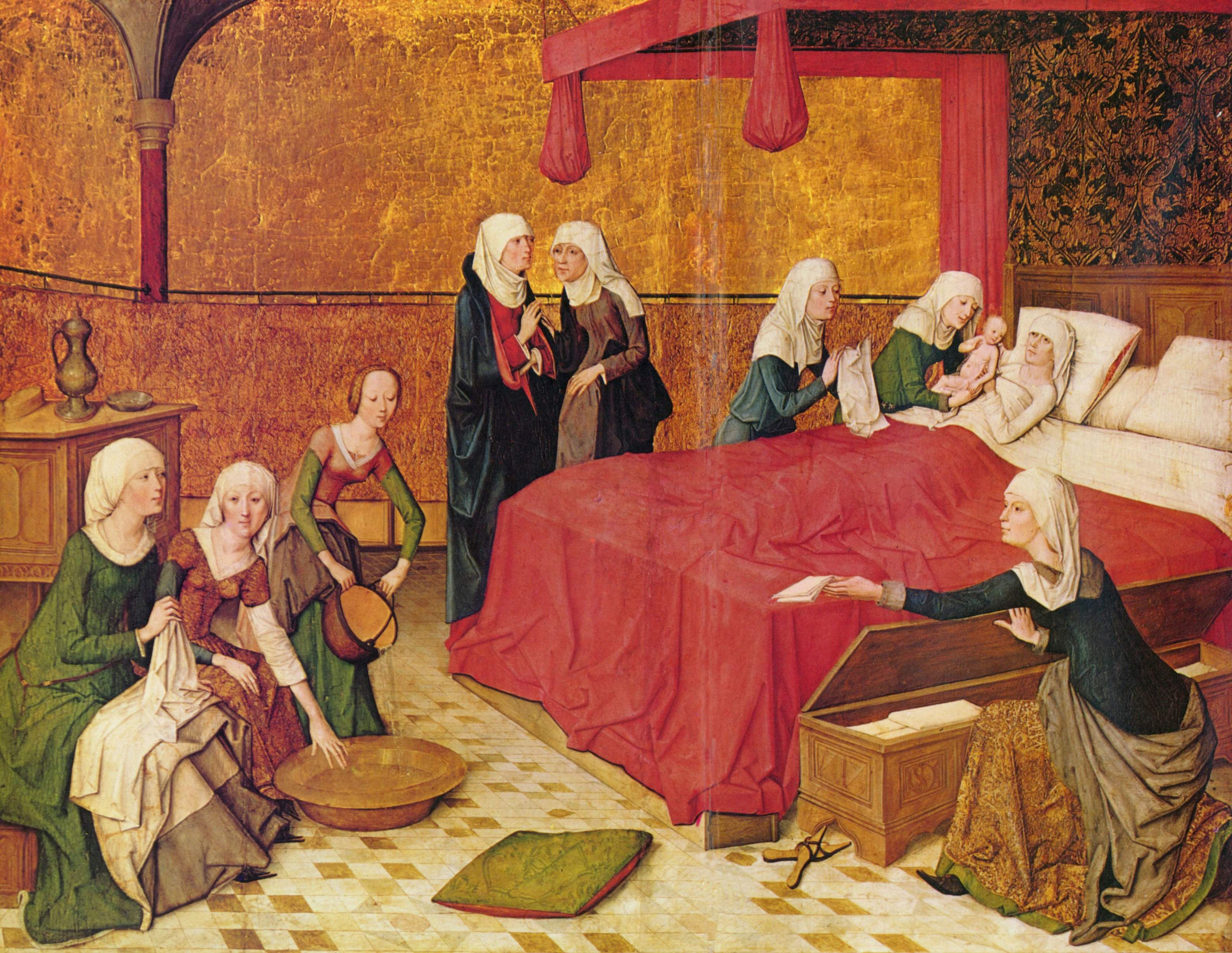
German Nativity of Mary, from the 8 scene cycle by the Master of the Life of the Virgin, 1463

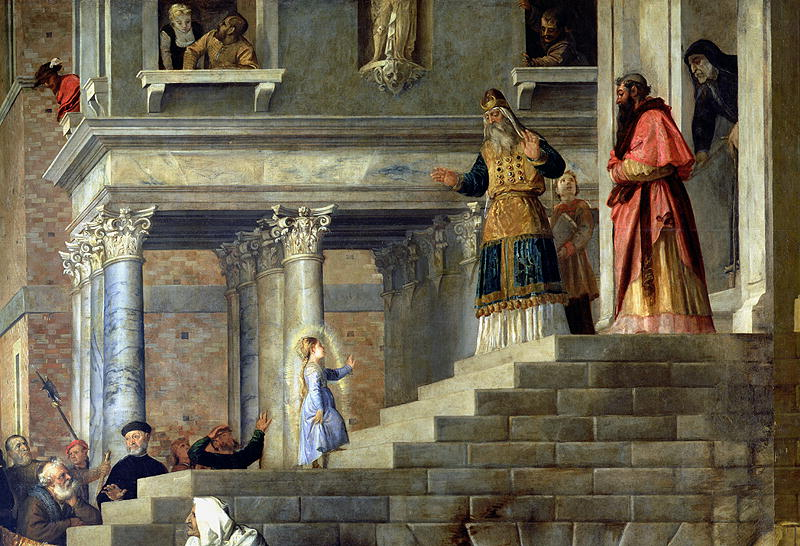
The Presentation of Mary by Titian

== See also ==
- Castelseprio
- Chora Church – late Byzantine cycle detailed.
