= Master of Zweder van Culemborg =

15th-century Netherlandish painter

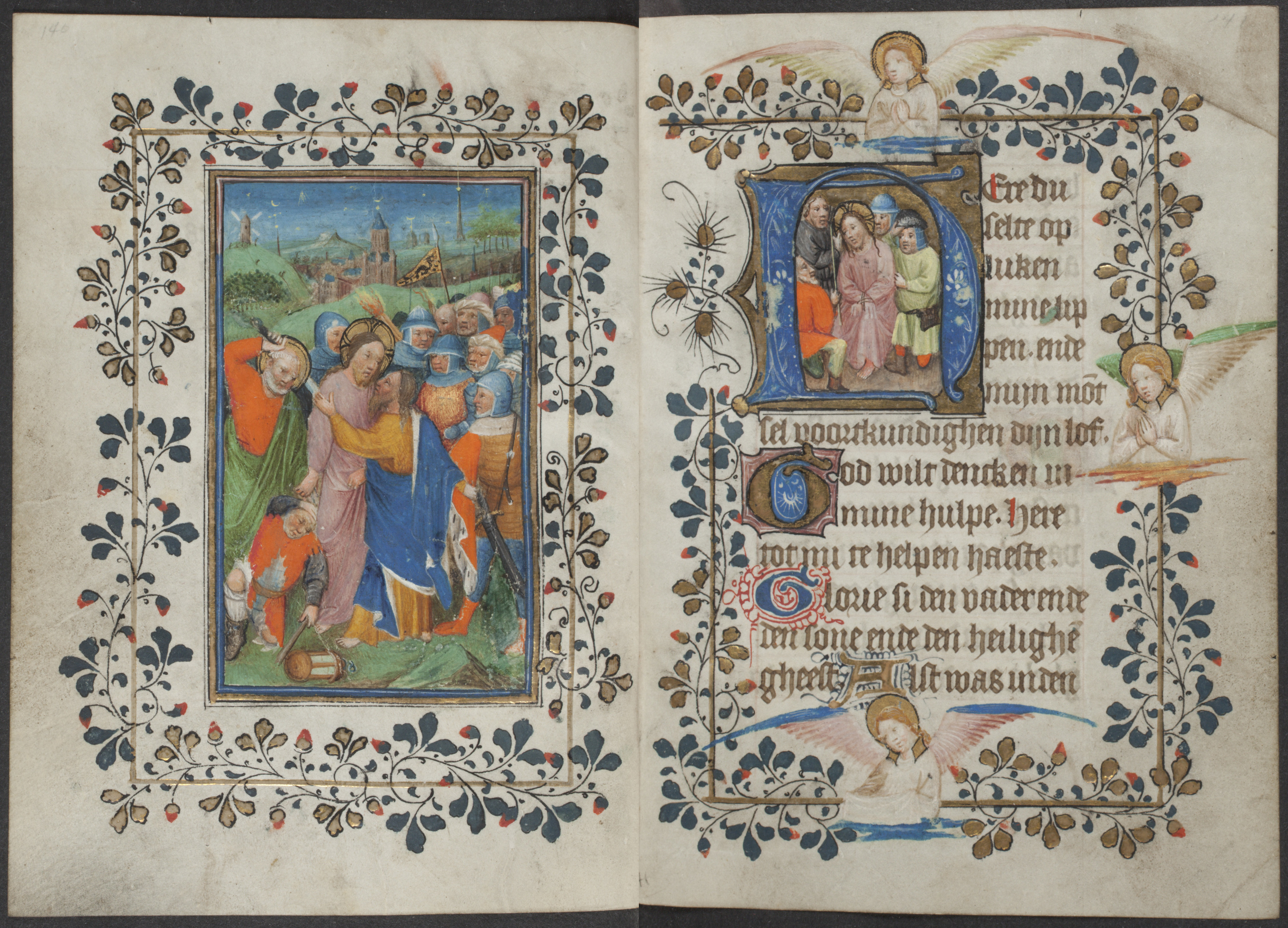
Full page miniature and initial in a Book of hours by the Master of Zweder van Culemborg - KB 79 K 2

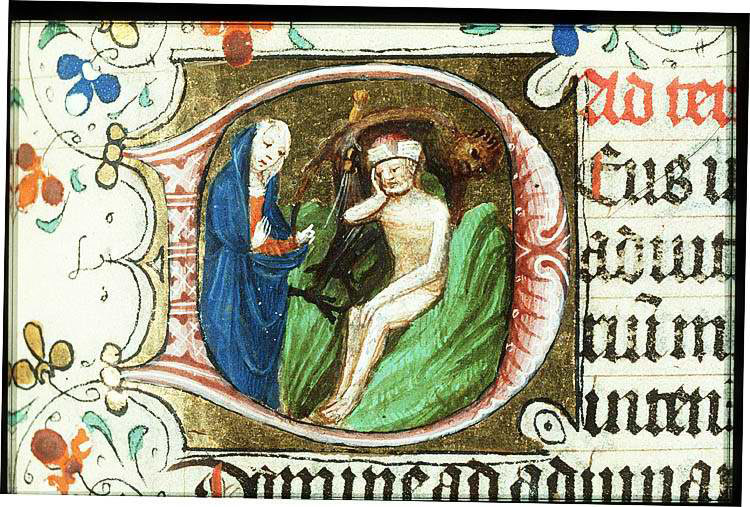
Letter from a manuscript illuminated by the Master of Zweder van Culemborg

The Master of Zweder van Culemborg (sometimes referred to as Master Pancracius) was a North Netherlandish painter of illuminated manuscripts active in the area around Utrecht between 1420 and 1440. His namepiece is a canon page in a Missal depicting a bishop worshipping the crucified Christ. According to a coat of arms in the border of the painting, the religious is Zweder van Culemborg, nominated to the town's bishopric in 1423; he was, however, unable to take his position until 1425. In 1431 he left for the Council of Basle; he died there two years later.

The Missal was most likely painted soon after the appointment of the new bishop. It contains sixteen initials, thirteen of which are believed to be by the Master. He did not, however, paint the canon page from which his name is derived. At least five other works, illuminated in whole or in part by the Master, survive; four are in the library in Utrecht, while one is now in the Fitzwilliam Museum in Cambridge.
