= Joachim =

Father of Mary in Christian tradition

Saint Joachim
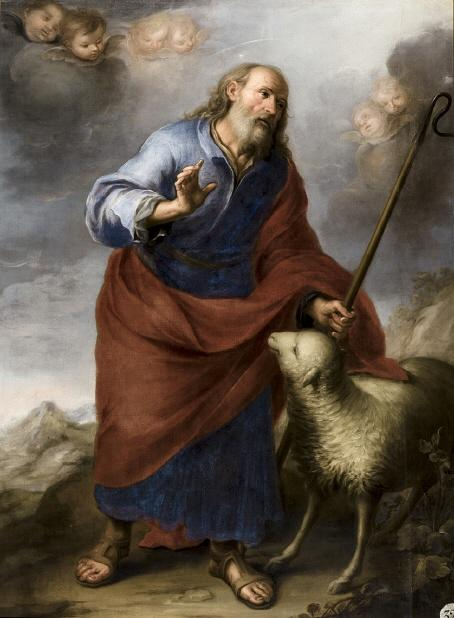
- Saint Joachim by Juan Simón Gutiérrez, c. 1700

Father of the Blessed Virgin Mary; Confessor
- Born: c. 75 BC; Nazareth, Hasmonean Judea
- Died: c. 18 BC; Jerusalem, Herodian Kingdom
- Venerated in: Catholic Church; Eastern Orthodox Church; Oriental Orthodox Churches; Anglican Communion; Lutheranism; Islam
- Canonized: Pre-Congregation
- Feast: 26 July (Catholic Church), (Anglican Communion); 9 September (Eastern Orthodox Church), (Greek Catholics); Calendar, (1738–1913); 16 August (General Roman Calendar, 1913–1969)
- Attributes: Lamb, doves, with Saint Anne or Mary
- Patronage: Fathers grandparents Adjuntas, Puerto Rico; Dolores, Eastern Samar; Fasnia, Tenerife; Carmelites; San Joaquin, Iloilo

Joachim (Note: /ˈdʒoʊəkɪm/; Hebrew: יהויקים, romanized: Yəhoyāqim, lit. 'he whom Yahweh has set up'; Greek: Ἰωακείμ, romanized: Iōākeím) was, according to Christian Sacred tradition, the husband of Saint Anne, the father of Mary and grandfather of Jesus. The story of Joachim and Anne first appears in the Gospel of James, part of the New Testament apocrypha. His feast day is 26 July, a date shared with Saint Anne.

== In Catholic tradition ==
The story of Joachim, his wife Anne (or Anna), and the miraculous birth of their child Mary, the mother of Jesus, was told for the first time in the 2nd-century apocryphal infancy-gospel the Gospel of James (also called the Protoevangelium of James). Joachim was a rich and pious man, who regularly gave to the poor; however, Charles Souvay, writing in the Catholic Encyclopedia, says that the idea that Joachim possessed large herds and flocks is doubtful. At the temple, Joachim's sacrifice was rejected, as the couple's childlessness was interpreted as a sign of divine displeasure. Joachim consequently withdrew to the desert, where he fasted and did penance for 40 days. Angels then appeared to both Joachim and Anne to promise them a child.

Joachim later returned to Jerusalem and embraced Anne at the city gate, located in the Walls of Jerusalem. An ancient belief held that a child born of an elderly mother who had given up hope of having offspring was destined for great things. Parallels occur in the Hebrew Bible in the case of Sarah, the wife of Abraham and mother of Isaac; Hannah, the mother of Samuel; and in the New Testament in the case of Elizabeth and Zechariah, the parents of John the Baptist. The cycle of legends concerning Joachim and Anne was included in the Golden Legend (around 1260) by Jacobus de Voragine. This cycle remained popular in Christian art until the Council of Trent (1545–1563) restricted the depiction of apocryphal events.

No liturgical celebration of Saint Joachim was included in the Tridentine calendar. It was added to the General Roman Calendar in 1584, for celebration on 20 March, the day after the feast day of Saint Joseph. In 1738, it was transferred to the Sunday within the Octave of the Assumption of Mary. As part of his effort to allow the liturgy of Sundays to be celebrated, Pope Pius X (term 1903–1914) transferred it to 16 August, the day after the Assumption, so Joachim may be remembered in the celebration of Mary's triumph. On May 28, 1906, Pope Saint Pius X introduced the indulgence of 300 days, that can be obtained once a day, for each invocation of "Saint Joachim, spouse of Saint Anne and father of the Blessed Virgin".

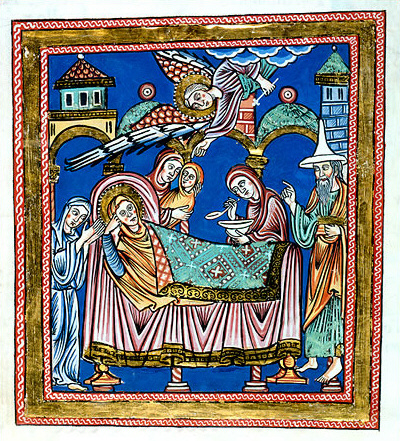
12th-century German Nativity of Mary, with Joachim wearing a Jewish hat

The feast was then celebrated as a Double of the Second Class, a rank that was changed in 1960 to that of Second Class Feast. In the 1969 revision of the General Roman Calendar, it was joined to that of Anne, for celebration on 26 July. The Eastern Orthodox Church and Eastern Catholic Churches commemorate Joachim on 9 September, the Synaxis of Joachim and Anne, the day after the Nativity of Mary. Joachim is remembered (with Anne) in the Church of England with a Lesser Festival on 26 July.

=== Patronage ===
Joachim is named as the patron saint of fathers, grandfathers, grandparents, married couples, cabinet makers, and linen traders.

=== Iconography ===
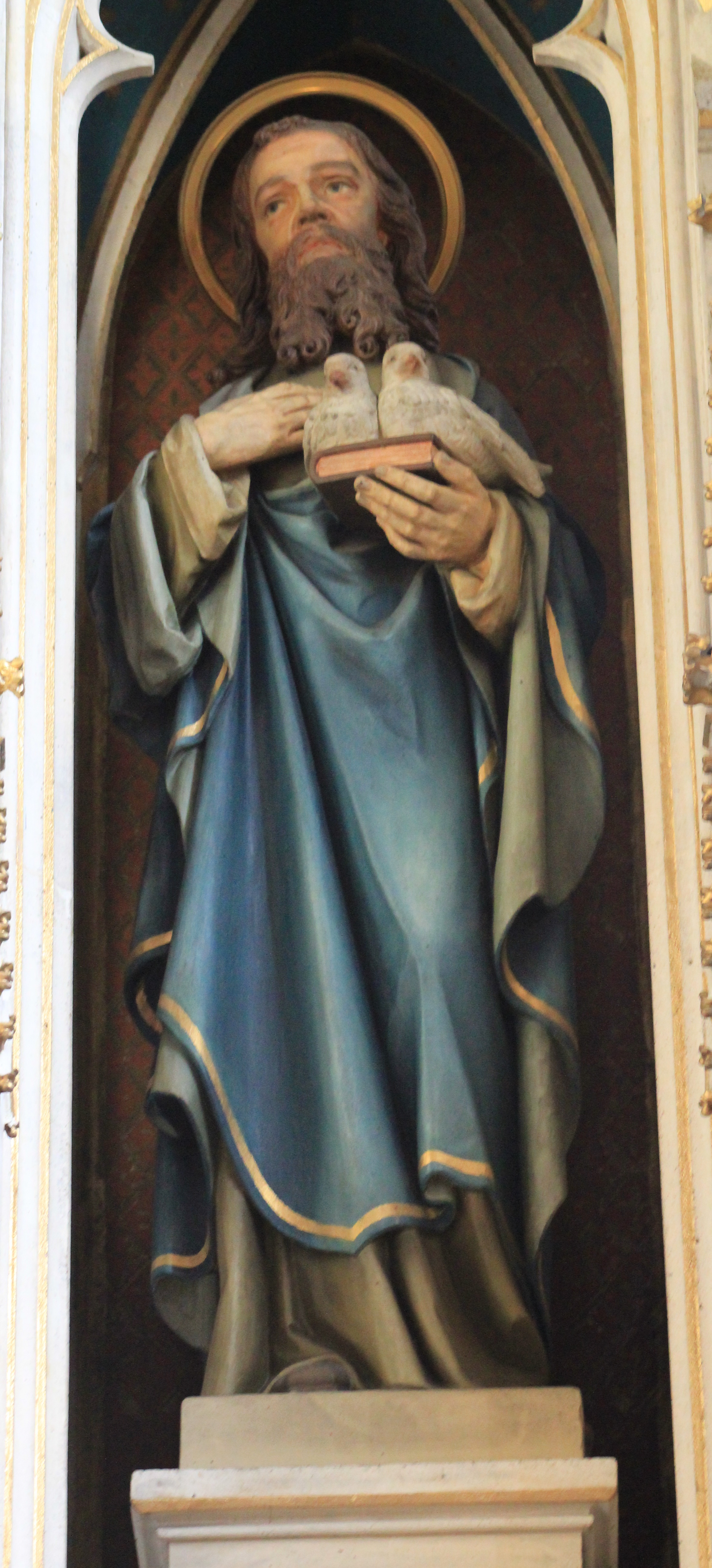
Statue of Saint Joachim at Church of St. Nicholas in Friesach

In medieval art, he often wears a conical Jewish hat. He is often treated as a saint, with a halo, but in the Latin Church, there was some awareness that he had quite likely died too soon to be counted as a Christian. Joachim and Anne Meeting at the Golden Gate was a popular subject in artistic renditions of the life of the Virgin.

Symbols associated with Saint Joachim include a book or scroll representing linen makers, a shepherd's staff for the Christian Word, and a basket of doves representing peace. He is almost always clothed in green, the color of hope. The name of the San Joaquin River dates to 1805–1808, when Spanish explorer Gabriel Moraga was surveying east from Mission San José to find possible sites for a mission. The name was in common use by 1810.

== See also ==
- Chronological list of saints in the 1st century
- Portal:Catholic Church/Patron Archive/July 26
