= Benedict Chelidonius =

Benedict Chelidonius or Schwalbe (also Benedict Chelydonius or Caledonius; born c. 1460; died 1521) was an abbot of the Scottish monastery at Vienna. A scholar of Greek and a Neo-Latin poet, he collaborated with the artist Albrecht Dürer. In some of his publications he used the name Musophilus.

== Life ==
The 17th-century historian Thomas Dempster claimed Benedict was of Scottish origin, presumably based on his surname (derived from the Greek cheridon, meaning swallow) and possibly his association with the Scottish Abbey in Vienna (which was actually founded by Irish monks). However, he was from the area around Nuremberg, where he became a monk at the Abbey of St Aegidius.

Chelidonius wrote Latin poetry on the passion of Christ and the life of the Blessed Virgin Mary to accompany woodcuts published by Albrecht Dürer in 1511. He moved to Vienna in 1514, becoming abbot of the Scottish Abbey in 1518. In 1519, he published an edition of the Libri quatuor sententiarum by 12th-century theologian Bandinus. This work was an abridgement of Peter Lombard's Sentences, which Chelidonius mistakenly believed was Lombard's model.

He was a close friend of theologian Johann Eck, an opponent of Martin Luther. Following Dempster, the Dictionary of National Biography attributed a tract against Luther, Contra Lutherum apostatam, to Chelidonius. However, the tract cannot be identified.

Benedict died on 8 September 1521.

== Works ==
- Voluptatis cum Virtute disceptatio, 1515.
- Bandini Sententiarum de Rebus Theologicis, 1519. Reprinted, Louvain, 1557.

== Sources ==
Stephen, Leslie, ed. (1885). "Benedict Chelydonius" . Dictionary of National Biography. Vol. 4. London: Smith, Elder & Co.
