= List of works by Hugo van der Goes =

The following is an incomplete list of paintings and drawings by the Early Netherlandish painter Hugo van der Goes. Attribution of his work has been difficult for art historians, and a great many works though, in the early to mid-20th century, to be by his hand are now accepted to be copies by members of his workshop or by followers. Often, when trying to establish attribution, if there was no documentary evidence, comparisons were made to his great 1470 Portinari Altarpiece, mentioned by Vasari.

Hugo appears to have left many drawings, and either from these or the paintings themselves followers made many copies of compositions that have not survived from his own hand.

== Works ==
=== Paintings ===
Work	Title	Date	Technique	Dimensions	Museum
	Monforte Altarpiece	ca. 1470	oil on panel	147x242 cm + 9x76,3 cm	Gemäldegalerie, Berlin
	The Death of the Virgin	ca. 1470	oil on panel	147,8 x 122,5 cm	Groeningemuseum Bruges
	Portinari Altarpiece	ca. 1470	oil on panel	253 x 586 cm	Uffizi, Florence
	Vienna Diptych	ca. 1475	oil on panel	32.3 x 21.9 cm (left); 34.4 x 22.8 cm (right)	Kunsthistorisches Museum, Vienna
	St Hippolyte Triptych (central panel attributed to Dieric Bouts)	ca. 1475	oil on panel	92 x 41 cm (linkerluik)	St. Salvator's Cathedral, Bruges
	Portrait of a donor with John the Baptist	ca. 1475	olieverf op paneel	32 x 22.5 cm	Walters Art Museum, Baltimore
	Portrait of a man	ca. 1475	oil on panel	oval 31,8 x 26 cm	Metropolitan Museum of Art, New York
	Trinity Altarpiece	ca. 1478 – 1479	oil on panel	202 x 100.5 cm (each panel)	National Gallery of Scotland, Edinburgh
	Left panel of the Deposition Diptych	ca. 1480	tempera on canvas	53.5 x 38.5 cm	The Phoebus Foundation
	Right panel of the Deposition Diptych	ca. 1480	tempera on canvas	53.5 x 38.5 cm	Gemäldegalerie, Berlin
	Adoration of the Shepherds	ca. 1480	oil on panel	97 x 245 cm	Gemäldegalerie, Berlin
	Madonna and child (middle panel of a triptych)	ca. 1480/1490	oil on panel	30 x 23 cm	Städelsches Kunstinstitut, Frankfurt am Main

=== Drawings ===
Work	Title	Date	Technique	Dimensions	Museum
	Jacob and Rachel	ca. 1470 – 1475	Pen and wash heightened with white on gray paper	338x572 mm	Christ Church, Oxford
	Joseph and Asenath	ca. 1475	Pen and yellowish-brown and dark brown ink, softly outlined in pen, remains of black stylus preliminary drawing (chalk?) on paper	max. diameter 214 mm	Ashmolean Museum, Oxford
	Christ on the cross	ca. 1475 – 1480	Brush and brown pigment, heightened with white, on grey-brown-violet grounded paper	258x204 mm	Windsor Castle

=== Workshop ===
Work	Title	Date	Technique	Dimensions	Museum
	Virgin and Child	ca. 1485	oil on panel	32 x 21 cm	National Gallery, London
	A Benedictine Monk	ca. 1478	oil on panel	25.1 x 18.7 cm	Metropolitan Museum of Art, New York

== Sources ==
- Campbell, Lorne. The Fifteenth-Century Netherlandish Paintings. London, National Gallery. New Haven: Yale University Press, 1998. ISBN 0-300-07701-7
