= Trinity Altarpiece =

Panel paintings by Hugo van der Goes

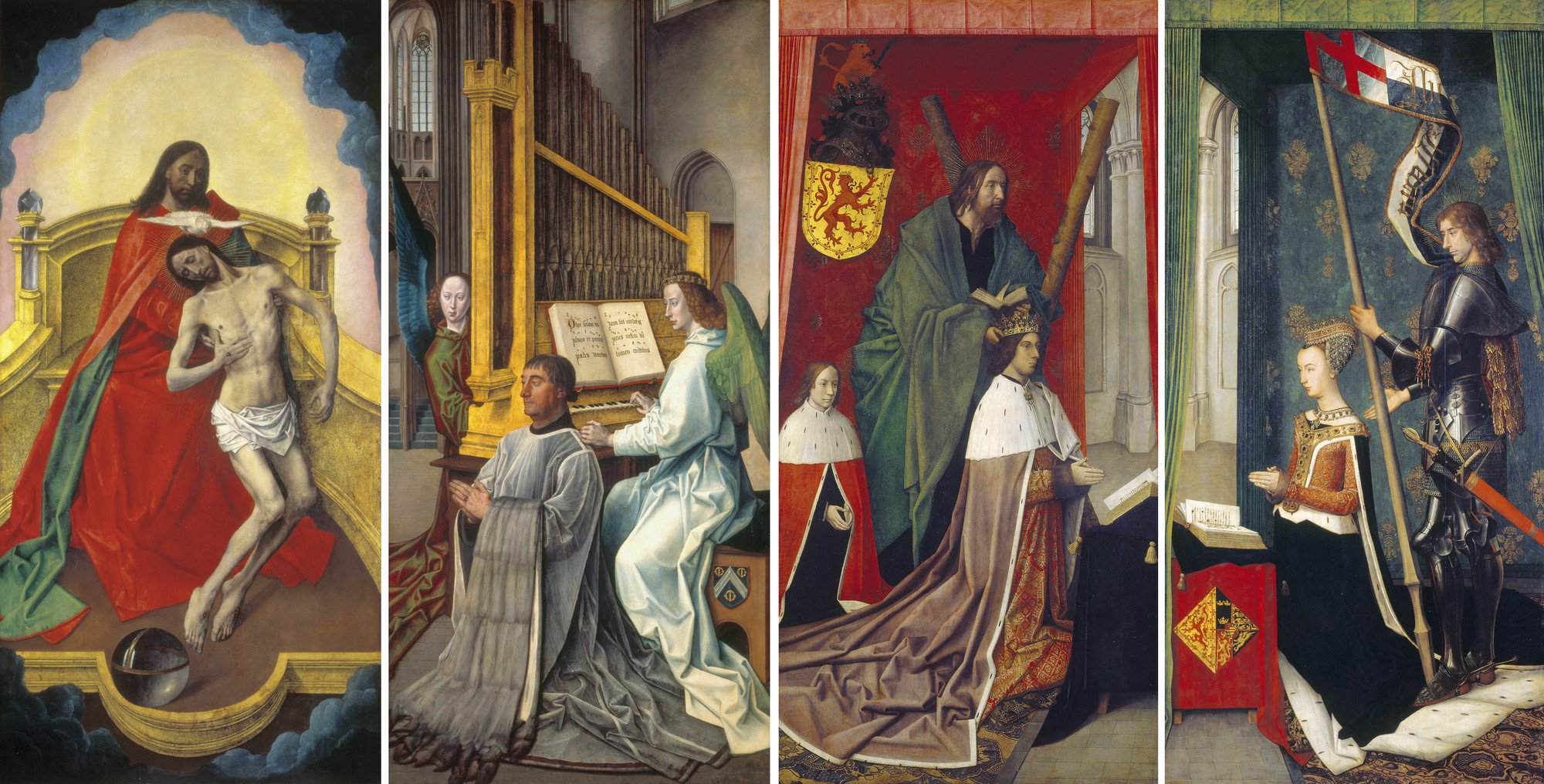
The Trinity Altarpiece

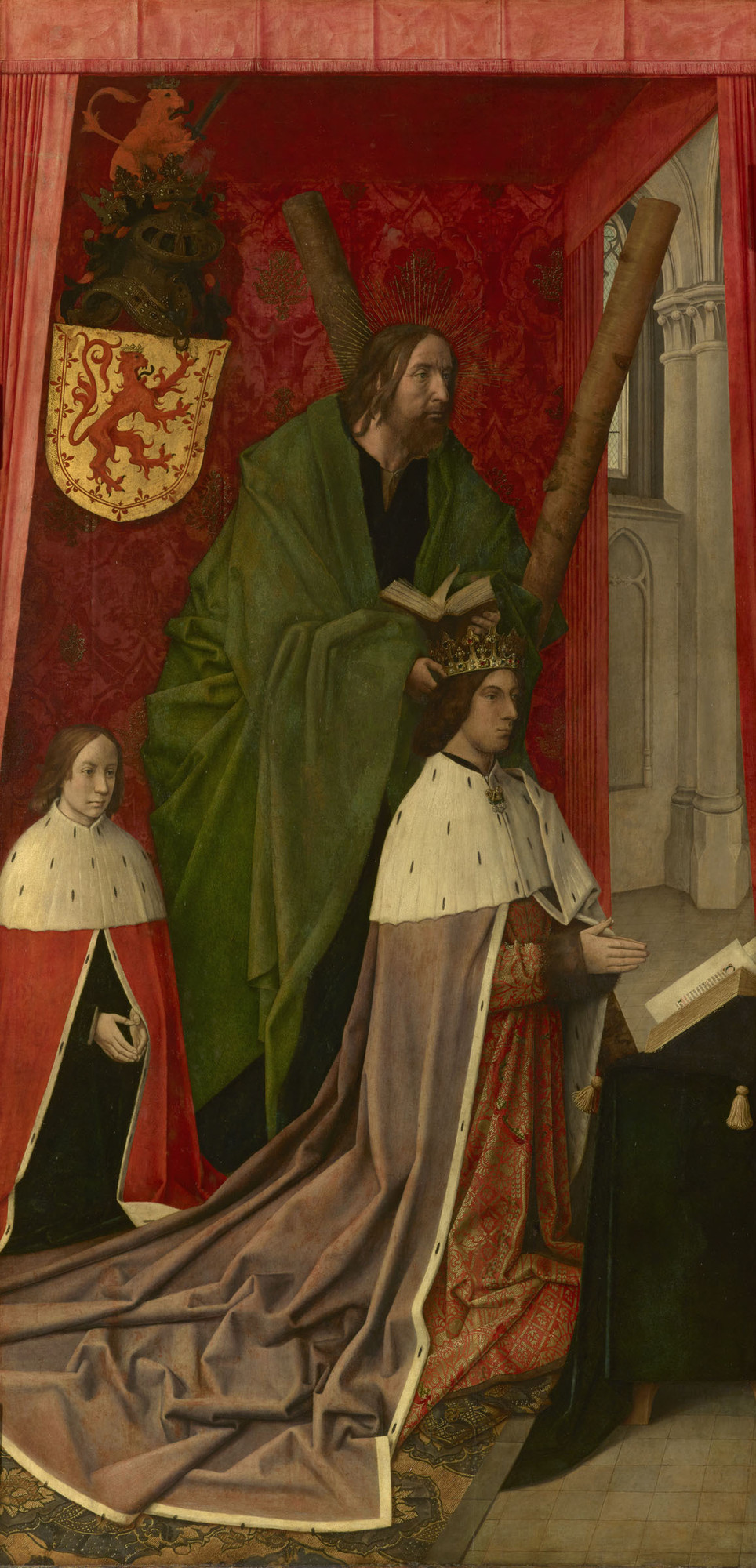
James III of Scotland accompanied by his son James, presented by St Andrew

The Trinity Altarpiece, also known as the Trinity Altar Panels, is a set of four paintings in oil on wood thought to have been commissioned in the late fifteenth century for the Trinity College Kirk in Edinburgh, Scotland. The panels are now part of the British Royal Collection and are loaned to the Scottish National Gallery.

They are now universally attributed to the Netherlandish artist Hugo van der Goes, with studio assistance, and probably represent the inner and outer panels of the wings of a triptych. The presumed central panel is lost; probably it contained a Virgin and Child. Van der Goes died in 1482, and the prince presumed to be the future James IV of Scotland was born in 1473; he appears to be at least five years old. A second son born in 1478 is not shown. As with the royal portraits in the Hours of James IV of Scotland a few years later, it is presumed that drawings were made in Scotland and sent to the artist.

The painting in the church was described as a "burd" ("board") on 17 May 1516 when John Stewart, Duke of Albany made an offering at the high altar on Trinity Sunday.

The work represents a rare example of religious art in Scotland to have survived the iconoclasm of the Scottish Reformation in 1560; the central panel was perhaps destroyed at this point. In the absence of any archival evidence, the inclusion of the portrait of the cleric Edward Bonkil (identified by heraldry) links the painting with the Trinity Church in Edinburgh, and it is possible that he commissioned the painting.

== In Stuart England ==
The painting was taken to England soon after the Union of the Crowns and in 1617 was recorded in the collection of Anne of Denmark, wife of James VI and I, at Oatlands, the panels unjointed and as yet "unhanged". According to notes added to the inventory, in 1618 Anne gave the picture to her son Prince Charles, who presented the painting to the Duke of Buckingham, but it is uncertain if the gift was made. The altarpiece was at Hampton Court in 1650. In 1857 Queen Victoria had the painting installed at the Palace of Holyroodhouse, and for many years it was placed in the palace gallery alongside the portraits of Scottish monarchs by Jacob de Wet II.

== Description ==
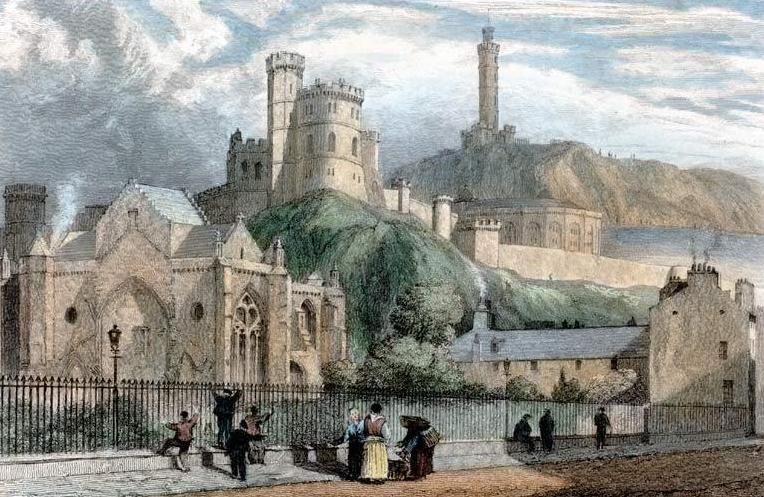
Trinity College Kirk in an engraving of 1825

The four panels depict the following subjects:

- The Holy Trinity.
- A praying cleric, thought to be a donor portrait of the contemporary Provost of Trinity College Kirk, Edward Bonkil, accompanied by two angels playing an organ.
- King James III of Scotland at prayer attended by Saint Andrew and a boy, presumed to be the future King James IV (born 1473). The royal arms of Scotland hang from a wall.
- Queen Margaret of Scotland at prayer attended by Saint George. Her royal arms decorate her lectern. She wears a caul embroidered with pearls.

== Edward Bonkil ==
Edward Bonkil was a member of a wealthy Edinburgh merchant family with commercial connections in Bruges. His father, Robert Bonkil, owned a house in Bruges. Edward's older brother, Alexander Bonkil, was a member of the Bruges Confraternity of the Holy Snow.

He may have commissioned the altarpiece to strengthen ties of the Trinity Collegiate Church with Margaret of Denmark, and the imagery used may express her interests and personal iconography.

== See also ==
- List of works by Hugo van der Goes
- Portinari Altarpiece
- Madonna in the Church
