= Virgin and Child (after van der Goes?) =

Painting by a follower of Hugo van der Goes

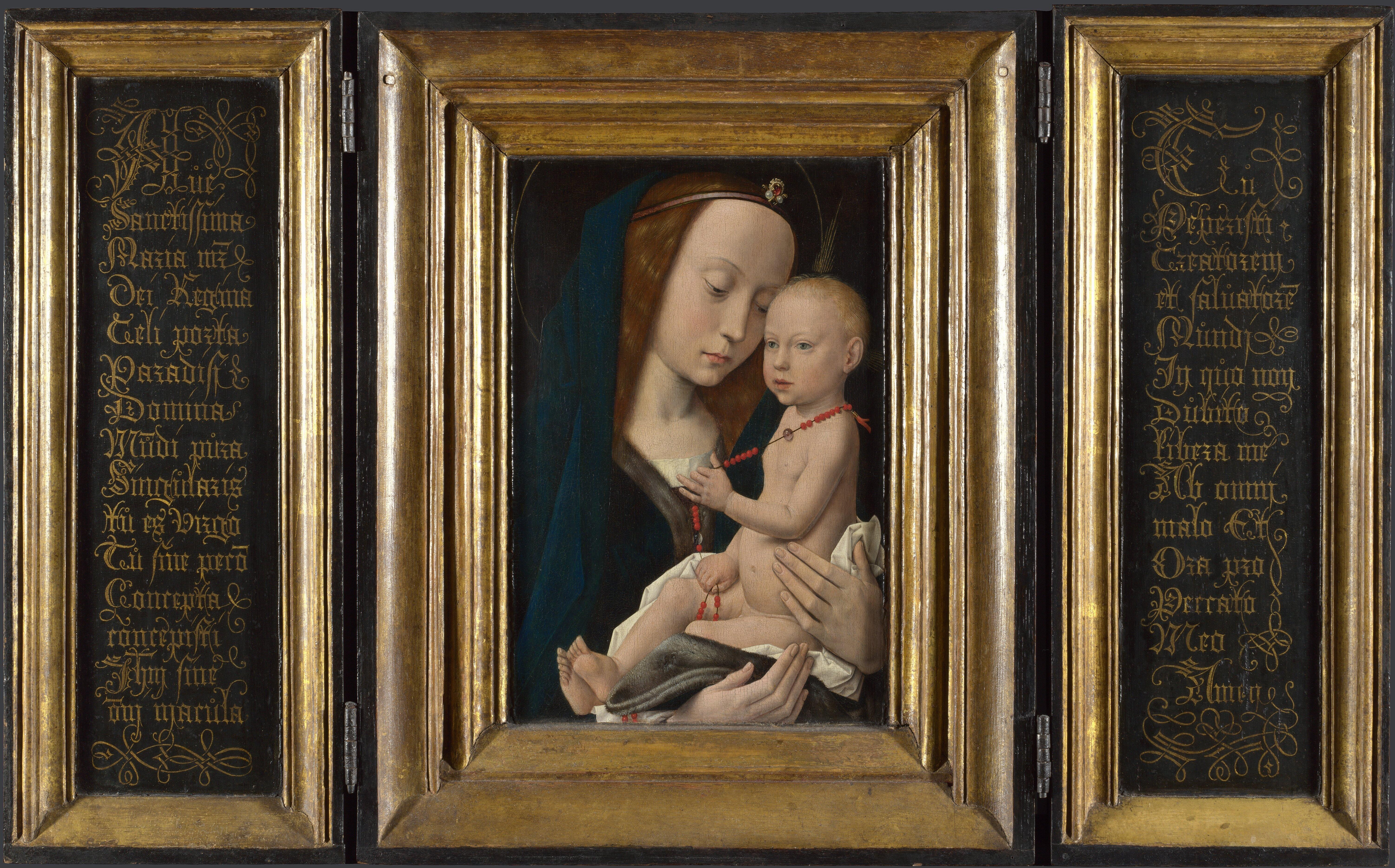
Virgin and Child; triptych by a follower of Hugo van der Goes, c. 1485. National Gallery, London, 32.3cm x 21.4 cm

Virgin and Child (or Virgin and Child with Prayer Wings) is a small c. 1485–1490 double-hinged oil on oak triptych with a central panel by a follower or workshop member of the Flemish painter Hugo van der Goes or Gerard David. The work is currently held in the National Gallery, London with the central panel in its original frame. The central image is a tightly cropped and intimate portrayal of Mary cradling the infant Jesus, who plays with a red rosary tied around his neck.

The work is a composite, probably assembled in the 19th century by an art dealer, with the framed central panel inserted into an altarpiece triptych which probably dates from c. 1500. The centre panel bears evidence that it was slightly planed down to fit into the frame. It is probably based on a then-popular and heavily copied Flemallesque Virgin and Child, the original of which is lost but known through numerous paintings and woodcuts.

The center panel has been attributed to a number of Early Netherlandish painters, including Rogier van der Weyden, Gerard David and van der Goes. It was completed at a time when the copying or adapting of works by the great Netherlandish painters was commonplace and a thriving, well paid industry. As the 15th century progressed, copying progressed from mere reproduction of the basic designs to a more complicated and involved process whereby works adapted elements from older works but established them with the particular artist's own vision. This panel is especially interesting in this regard, it has been described as "executed in Gerard David's painting style after a work which, due to facial type, might be attributed to van der Goes, who in turn depended compositionally on an iconic model, perhaps that in Cambrai or one of its numerous northern copies. Here is copy upon copy, each slightly transformed through personal style and artistic feeling."

== Description ==
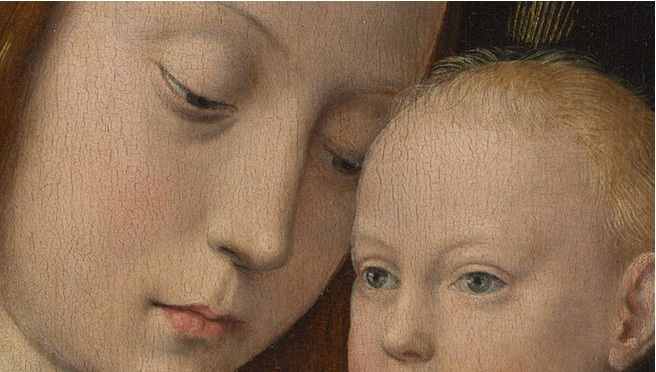
Detail of the central panel showing the faces of Mary and the child Jesus.

Both figures in the central panel have gilded halos. Mary is shown as be very young, likely no older than 15. She has blue green-eyes and reddish-blond hair, which is decorated with a green striped headband studded with an ornament jewelled with a ruby, two pearls and a diamond. She wears a long blue mantle which veils her face and drapes over her purple under-dress and blue fur-lined dress. The fur line extends beneath the child. The child has short blond hair and blue eyes and is cradled by Mary's hand; her long, fine fingers are shown reaching under his legs and across the lower chest. He is shown sitting on white cloth, toying with a string of red coral rosary beads which cast a shadow over his chest. The beads are strung on a green chord which drapes over his shoulder. At the time coral was used to protect children from evil spirits.

Areas of the central panel have faded or are damaged, especially around the child's cheek, and across the Virgin's veil. As a result, it was heavily over-painted before it was acquired by Layard. All three were cleaned and restored by the National Gallery in 1957 when most of the over-paint was removed.

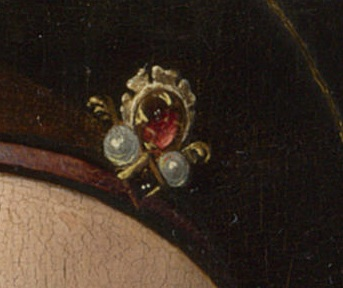
Detail showing Mary's the jeweled ornament on her headband.

While the background of the centre panel is painted in solid black, the black of the outer wings is mixed with red earth. The reverse of each panel is coated with thick matt black, although they had been at some early point layered with white paint. The lack of any background detail is unusual for paintings of the era, but along with the close cropping, reinforces the intimacy of the panel. In addition, it removes the figures from any earthly context, and further reinforces their idealised and sacred presentation, they seem far removed from our own world. The single oak boards of the outer wings are both of vertical grain, and it is likely that the hinges are original 1500 c. They wings are still shuttable via an outer hook which fits with a ring on the back of the left panel. Both nail and hook seem to be original.

== Inscription ==
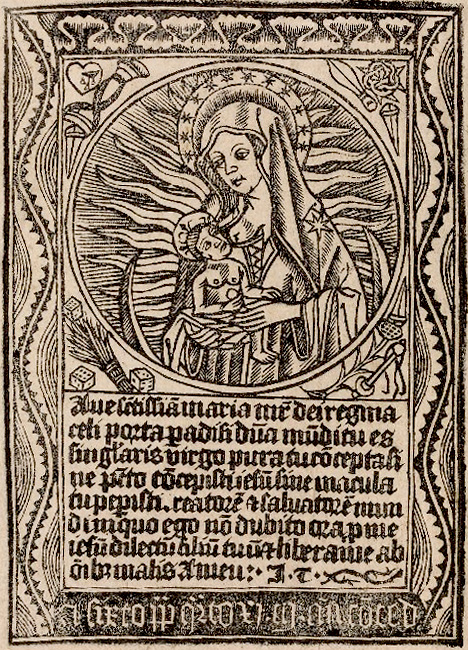
The Madonna and Child in a Glory with the Instruments of the Passion. England (?) or Netherlands (?, c.1480-1500) Bodleian Library. An example of a Virgo in Sole image.

Campbell notes that there is no indication that the engraved frame of the Virgin and Child was ever hinged, and thus no reason to suppose that it was ever part of a triptych. Its outer frame with its attached wings show, however, that the frame originally housed a Virgo in Sole image, depicting the Virgin as the apocalyptic "woman clothed with the sun, with the moon under her feet, and on her head a crown of twelve stars" of Revelation 12:1.

The outer wings are attached by four hinges. They contain inscriptions gilded on yellow mordant, the text of which are prayers to Mary written in Latin. These read as follows, with translations (the correspondence between phrases is only approximate because of the differing syntaxes of Latin and English):

Left panel

Ave
Sanctissima
Maria m[ate]r
Dei Regina
Celi porta
Paradisi
Domina
Mu[n]>di pura
Singularis
tu es Virgo
Tu sine pec[cat]o
Concepta
concepisti
Ih[esu]m sine
o[m]ni macula.

Hail,
Most Holy
Mary, Mother
of God, Queen
of Heaven, Gate
of Paradise,
Mistress
of the world,
thou are a uniquely
pure virgin;
yourself conceived
without sin,
you conceived
Jesus without
any stain.

Right panel

Tu
Peperisti
Creatorem
et saluatore[m]
Mundi
In quo non
Dubito
libera me
Ab omni
malo Et
Ora pro
Peccato
Meo
Amen.

You
have borne
the Creator
and Saviour
of the World
in whom I
do not doubt.
Deliver me
From every
evil and
pray for
my
sin.
Amen.

The prayer, which was immensely popular in the Middle Ages, refers to the Immaculate Conception of the Virgin Mary i.e. to say not the doctrine of the Virgin Birth but rather that Mary herself was conceived free of original sin (hence the yourself conceived without sin of the prayer), a doctrine made popular by Pope Sixtus IV who was said to have granted an indulgence of 11,000 years to anyone who recited the prayer before an image of the Virgo in Sole.

The manuscript page on the right from the Bodleian Library is an example of such an image. It depicts the Virgin and Child with haloes surrounded by a glory (i.e. a circle of light surrounding the head). The Virgin Mary has twelve stars in her halo and is standing on a crescent moon. The Christ child is holding the host. In the four corners are found the bleeding Sacred Heart and instruments of the Passion. Below the image is the same prayer above.

== Provenance ==
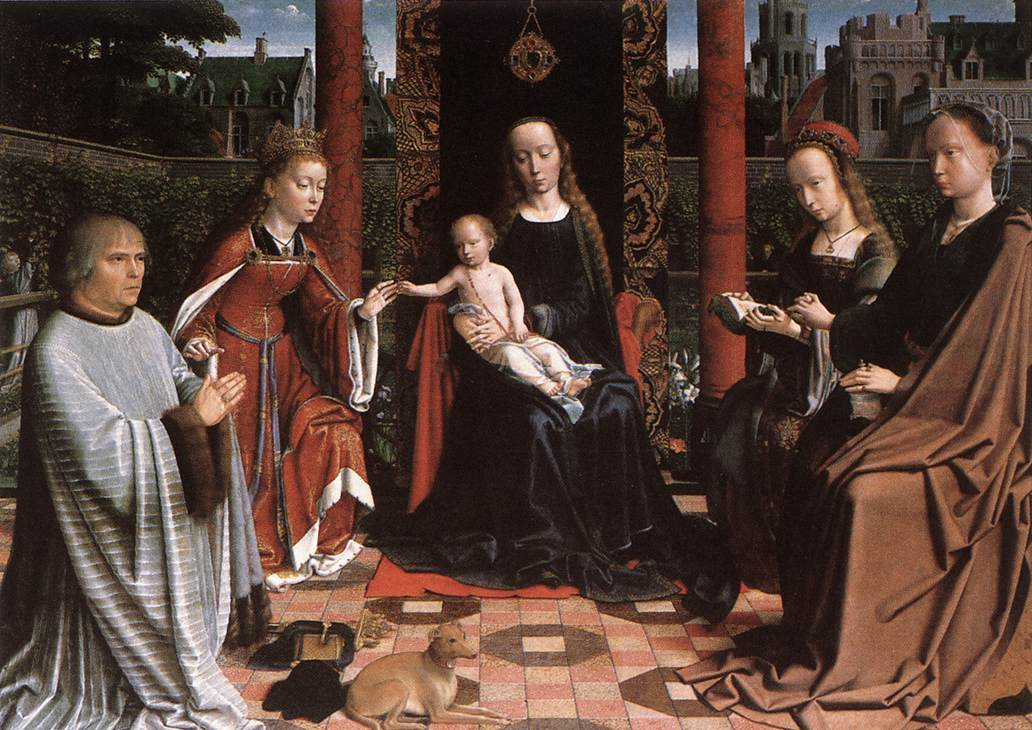
Gerard David, Virgin and Child with Saints and Donor. National Gallery, London

It was purchased as a composite by Austen Henry Layard in 1872 as a van der Weyden from a collector in Madrid. He died in 1894, and it was kept by his widow in Venice until her death in 1914. It was bequeathed to the National Gallery in London along with other works in Layard's collection. The central panel was attributed to Petrus Christus in 1875, and later to Hans Memling. A 1920 National Gallery catalogue gives it as a van der Goes, which was later revised to a copy of van der Goes by Gerard David, possibly due both the Virgin and child's similarity to the figure in David's Virgin and Child with Saints and Donor, also in the National Gallery. The attribution was finally narrowed to van der Goes' workshop due to the similarity of the Virgin to her portrayal in his c. 1475 Portinari Altarpiece.

The outer wings are connected to the central frame by four dove-tailed hinges or joiners. This technique was unique to Brussels at the time, a fact used to narrow the work's attribution. Van der Goes spent his last years just outside the city, and it is believed that the central panel was completed by a member of his workshop. Comparisons to his later works indicated that the artist behind the central panel was not as skilled a draughtsman as his master, although x-ray studies of the under-drawing show that he seems to have been aware of his limitations and to have sought ways to work around them. In particular he seems to have struggled with the placing with the Virgin's left eye; ironically its initial placing as revealed in the under-drawing is more anatomically correct than the final position.
