= Adoration of the Kings (Gossaert) =

Painting by Jan Gossaert

The Adoration of the Kings
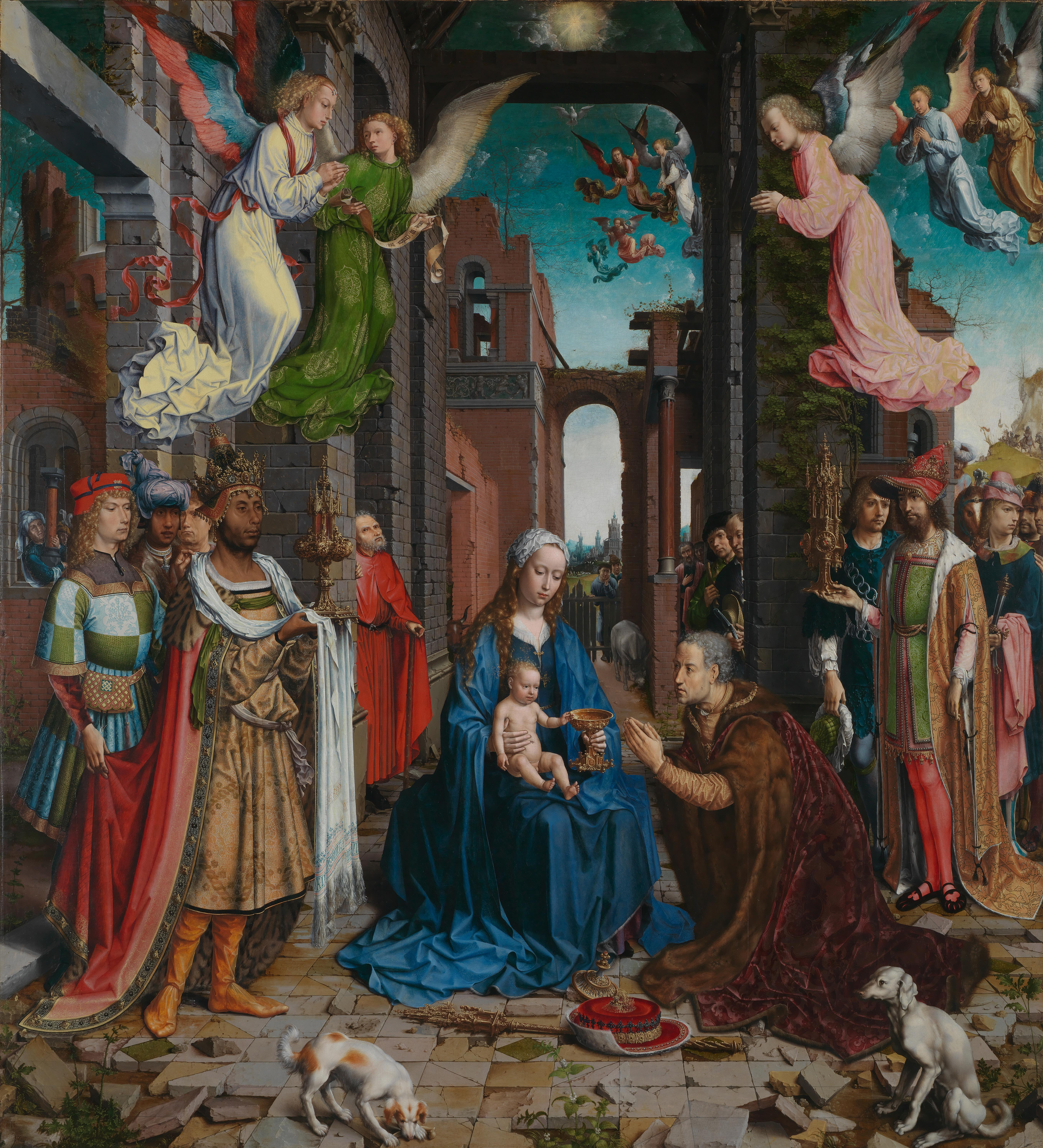
- Artist: Jan Gossaert
- Year: 1510–1515
- Medium: Oil on oak
- Dimensions: 177.2 cm × 161.8 cm (69.8 in × 63.7 in)
- Location: National Gallery, London

The Adoration of the Kings is a large oil-on-oak painting by Jan Gossaert (born Jean Gossart, also known as Jan Mabuse), dated to 1510–15, depicting the Adoration of the Magi. Although Gossaert's name is signed on the border of Balthazar's richly embroidered headdress, and on a collar worn by Balthazar's turbaned attendant, the painting was occasionally attributed to Albrecht Dürer in the 17th and 18th centuries. In 2010, Ainsworth suggested that the work was a collaboration between Gossaert and Gerard David.

== Painting ==
In the center of the painting, the Madonna and child sit in the destruction of a building, receiving a gift from the kneeling Caspar to the right; the Christ-child holds a gold coin in his left hand, almost as if he were offering Caspar a communion wafer. Six shepherds, an ass and a cow watch from behind, with a grey-bearded Joseph – depicted in a bright red robe, contrasting with Mary's traditional garb of deep blue – standing behind a column to the left. More shepherds and their flock are barely visible in the distance.

To the right of Caspar stands Melchior holding his gift, accompanied by four attendants, with more attendants approaching from the distance on horseback. Balthazar stands to the left with his gift and three attendants. Balthazar's richly decorated crown is inscribed with his name at its peak and Gossaert's name towards the bottom; Gossaert's name also appears on a collar worn by Balthazar's turbaned black attendant. Further left, two more attendants in exotic dress watch from a window.

Nine angels (perhaps representing the nine orders of angels) look down through the structure of the ruined building, one holding a scroll bearing the words "Gloria in excelsis deo". A bird – symbolising the Holy Spirit – hovers above, while the Star of Bethlehem shines brightly at the top of the painting. Several babies appear as decorative details, in the architectural frieze and the capitals, and on the golden vessel for Balthazar's gift. A tenth angel – possibly a self-portrait of Gossaert – is barely visible, in a doorway behind the ox.

== Technical details and composition ==
The work was painted on a wooden panel consisting of six oak boards, laid vertically, measuring 177.2 centimetres (69.8 in) high by 161.8 centimetres (63.7 in) wide. The paint was applied to a ground of chalk fixed with animal glue, with a thin priming layer of lead white mixed with a little lead-tin-yellow. There is much underdrawing, visible in some areas due to the paint having become more transparent. A number of details were added at a late stage, over areas previously painted, including the two figures at the window to the left; the ox and the ass; the two shepherds behind the ass and the shepherds in the distance; Joseph's stick; Caspar's sceptre and the lid of Caspar's goblet.

Gossaert's composition draws from several sources. It takes its main inspiration from the Monforte altarpiece by Hugo van der Goes (Gemäldegalerie, Staatliche Museen, Berlin), which has a similar grouping of richly dressed Mary and Magi among ruined architecture, with their attendants and bystanders, and glimpses of the landscape behind and angels above. The two dogs in the foreground, on a floor with many broken tiles, are copied from other engravings: one taken from the lower right corner of Dürer's engraving of Saint Eustace and the second is a reflection of the dog in an engraving of the "Adoration of the Kings" by Martin Schongauer. Other elements are drawn from other prints by Schongauer and Dürer.

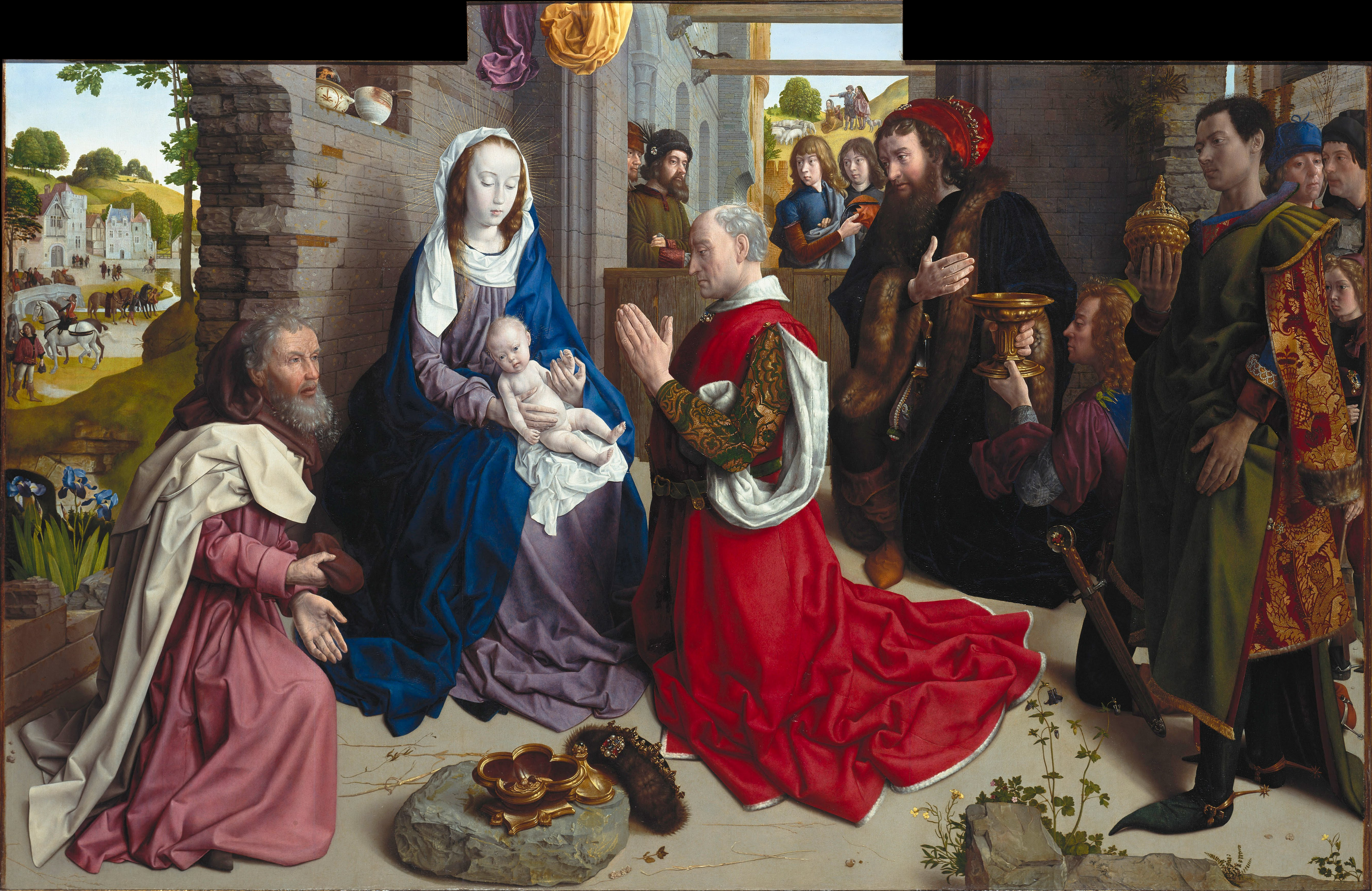
The Monforte altarpiece by Hugo van der Goes

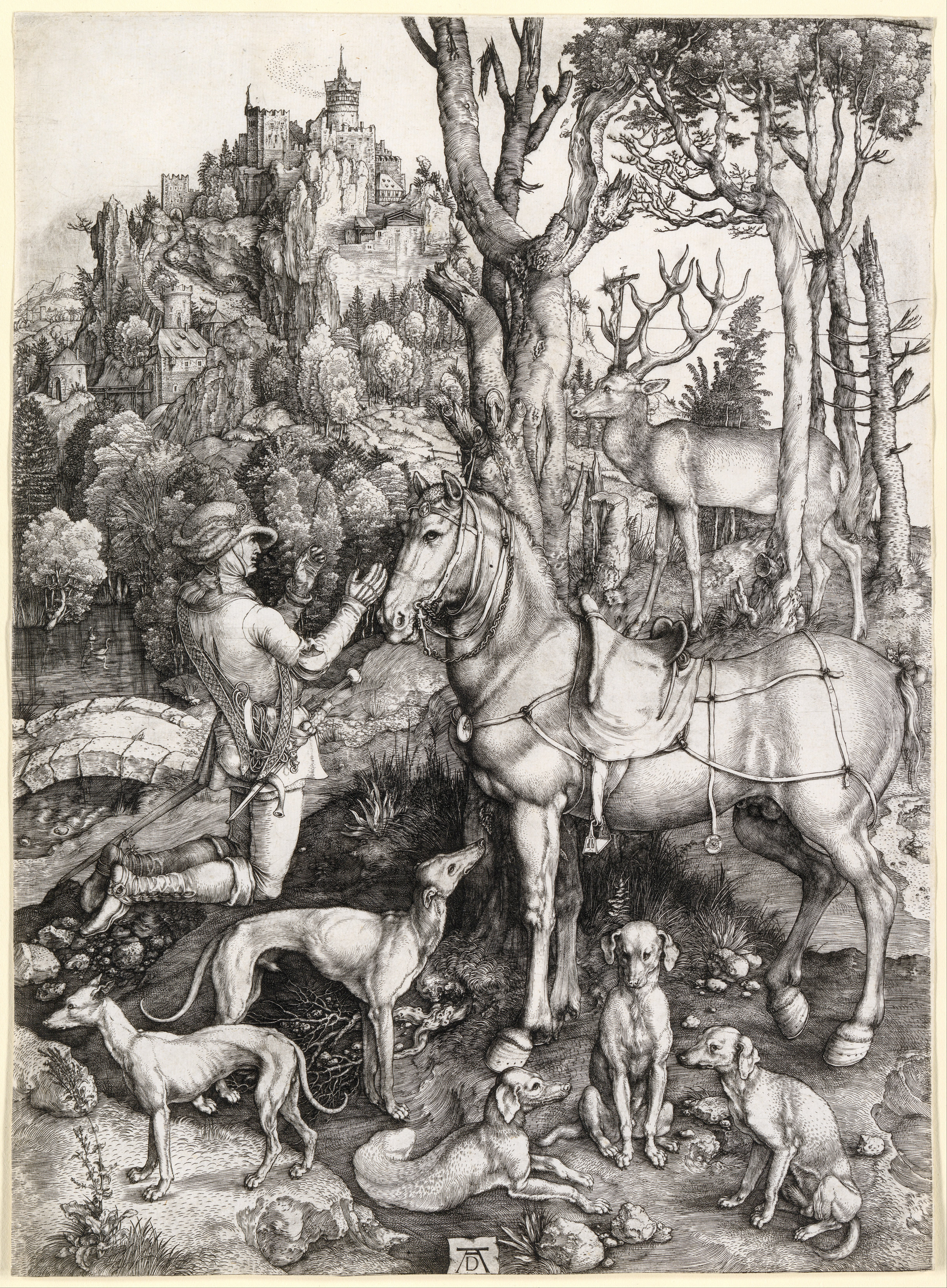
Albrecht Dürer's engraving of Saint Eustace

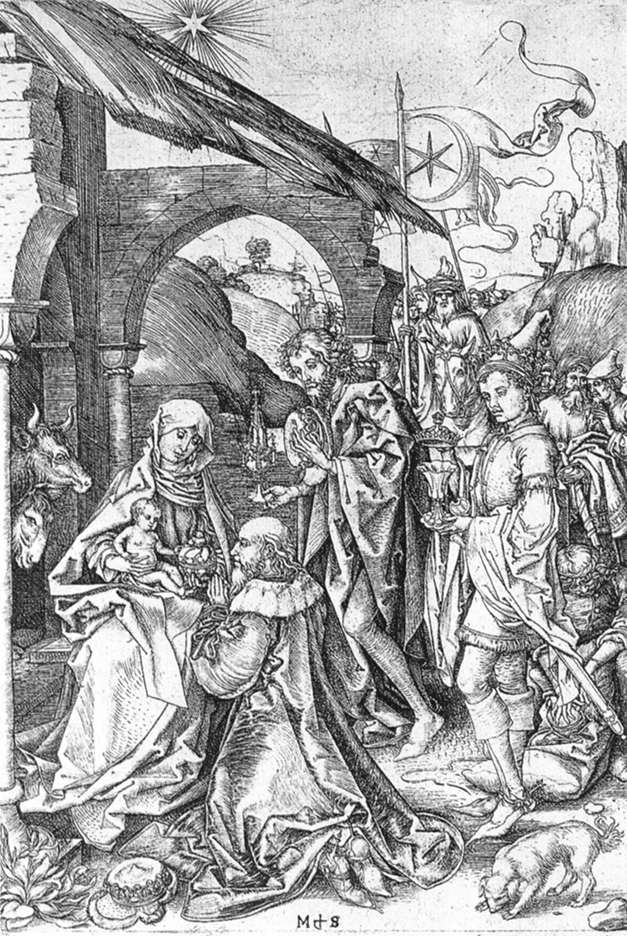
Adoration of the Kings by Martin Schongauer

== History ==
The origins of the painting are unclear. It may have been commissioned by David of Burgundy, Bishop of Utrecht from 1456 to 1496, or his half-brother, Philip of Burgundy, who was Bishop from 1517 to 1524. Lorne Campbell argues that the painting was commissioned by Daniel van Boechout, Lord of Boerlare and Beverweerd, as the altarpiece of the Lady Chapel of the Benedictine Abbey of St Adrian in Geraardsbergen, in East Flanders, south of Ghent and west of Brussels, where it first enters the historical record in 1600. It was bought by the rulers of the Habsburg Netherlands, Albert and Isabella, in 1601, who had seen it at the abbey the previous year. They paid £2,100 to the abbot, and moved the painting to become the altar of the chapel of their palace in Brussels. The palace was destroyed by a fire in February 1731, but the chapel and its contents survived. The chapel was demolished in the 1770s, but the painting had already been removed by the Governor of the Austrian Netherlands, Charles of Lorraine. It was sold after Charles' death in 1781 to Emmanuel-Marie de Cock, Pensionary of Brussels and Greffier-Pensionary of the States of Brabant.

A painting matching its description came to London in 1787 and was sold at an auction held in London by John Greenwood the following year. It came into the possession of art dealer Michael Bryan by 1795, and was sold to Frederick Howard, 5th Earl of Carlisle, who displayed it at Castle Howard. It was restored in 1884 by William Morrill, and then moved to Naworth Castle.

George Howard, 9th Earl of Carlisle served as a Trustee of the National Gallery for more than 30 years, and offered to sell the painting to the National Gallery shortly before his death in 1911. His widow honoured his wishes, and the painting was bought by the gallery later in 1911. The £40,000 purchase price was funded by an advance of the gallery's annual purchase grant and other gallery funds, with contributions from The Art Fund, Edward Tennant, 1st Baron Glenconner, Edward Guinness, 1st Earl of Iveagh, Alfred de Rothschild, and George Curzon, Earl (later Marquess) Curzon of Kedleston. The gallery published a monograph by Maurice W. Brockwell to commemorate the acquisition – the first such publication by the gallery.

Copies are held by the Museo Nacional de San Carlos in Mexico City, the Wittelsbacher Ausgleichfonds in Munich, the church of St John the Baptist in Nethen, the National Gallery in Prague, and the Tula Art Museum.
