= Adoration of the Shepherds (der Goes) =

Painting by Hugo van der Goes

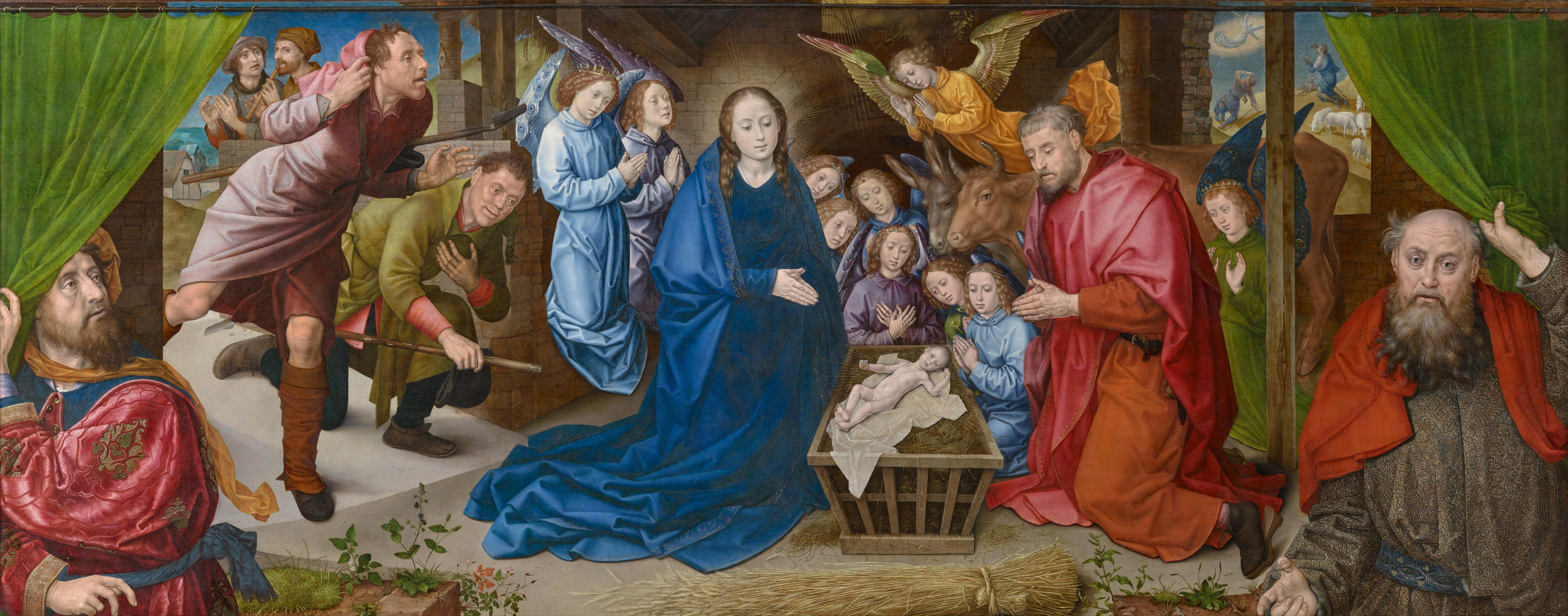
- Artist: Hugo van der Goes
- Year: c. 1480
- Medium: Oils
- Dimensions: 97 cm × 245 cm (38 in × 96 in)
- Location: Gemäldegalerie, Berlin

Adoration of the Shepherds (also referred to as The Nativity) is a late oil painting by the Flemish Northern Renaissance painter Hugo van der Goes, now in the Gemäldegalerie, Berlin. Unusually large for van der Goes, it is less well-known than his Portinari Triptych or his Monforte Altarpiece on the same subject. He produced it before renouncing his worldly life and becoming a lay brother at Rouge-Cloître Abbey near Brussels, a daughter house of the Windesheim Congregation in the strict tradition of the Brethren of the Common Life, part of the wider devotio moderna movement.

The scene is flanked by two prophets from the Hebrew scriptures, shown half-length and holding up a green curtain, which they part to show the scene. Standing in front of the scene, they act as intermediaries between it and the viewer, with the right-hand one with his hand and mouth open as if to speak. According to art historian Hans Belting, the panel "is indeed a scene in the theatrical sense, as we see the curtains opening on the stable in Bethlehem as if the play is about to begin." The scene itself includes three shepherds as well as a background scene showing the angels announcing Christ's birth to them. The Christ Child looks out at the viewer and behind him, Mary and Joseph is a group of angels.

== See also ==
- List of works by Hugo van der Goes

== Bibliography ==
- (in German) Hans Belting, Die Erfindung des Gemäldes. Das erste Jahrhundert der Niederländischen Malerei, Munich, Hirmer Verlag, 1994; chapter 14, "Hugo Van der Goes. A painted theatre"
- Larousse (ed.). "Hugo van der Goes". Dictionnaire de la peinture (in French). Larousse..
- (in French) Rivages de Bohême
- Nevet Dolev (1999). Publication of the Tel-Aviv University Faculty of Fine Arts, Section B (ed.). "Gaspar Ofhuys' chronicle and Hugo van der Goes" (PDF). Assaph B. 4: 125–137. ISSN 0333-6476.
