= Monforte Altarpiece =

Painting by Hugo van der Goes

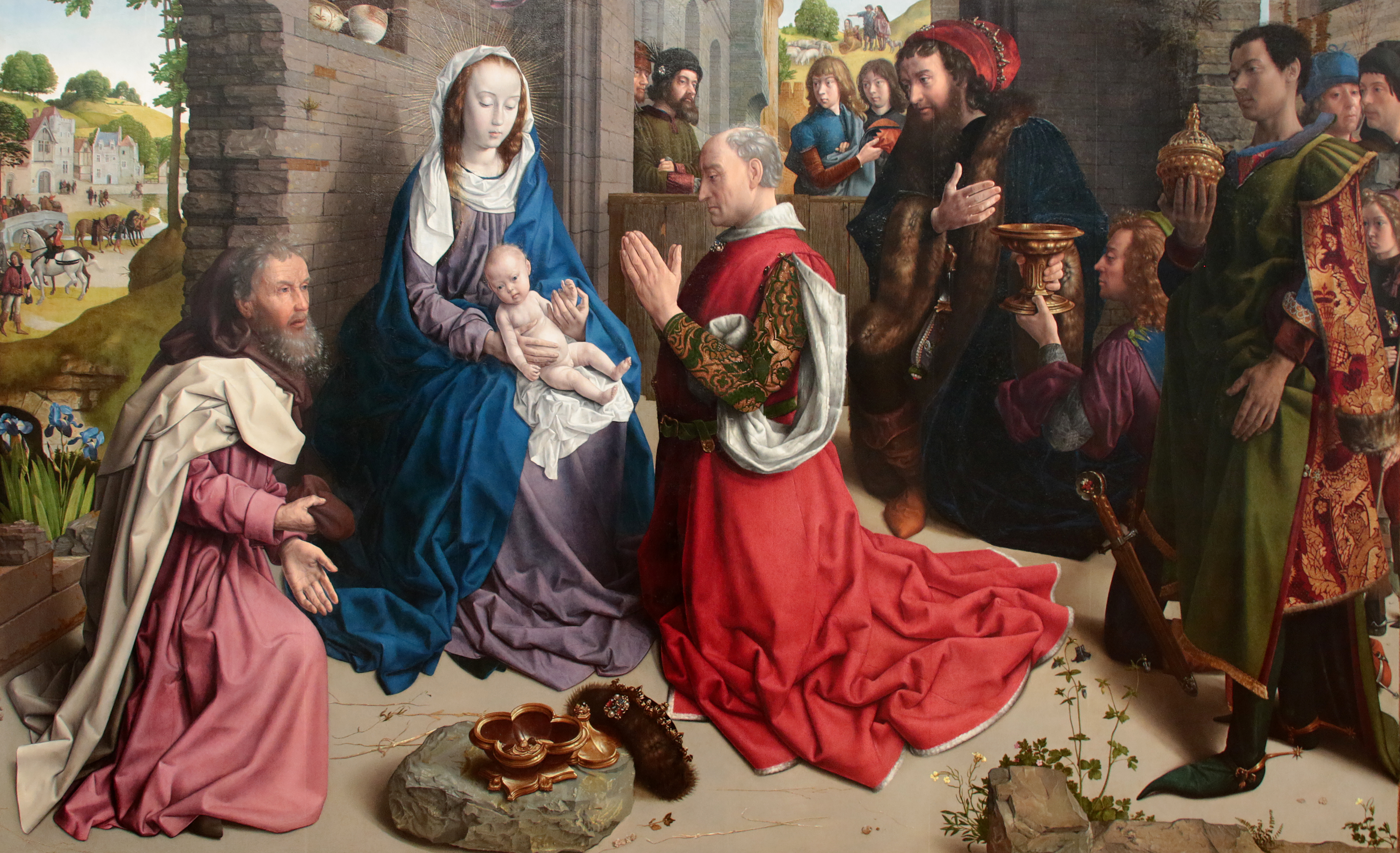
- Artist: Hugo van der Goes
- Year: c. 1470
- Medium: Oil on wood
- Dimensions: 147 cm × 242 cm (58 in × 95 in)
- Location: Gemäldegalerie, Berlin

The Monforte Altarpiece (c. 1470) is an oil-on-oak-panel painting of the Adoration of the Magi by the Flemish painter Hugo van der Goes, now housed in the Gemäldegalerie, Berlin, Germany. The altarpiece was originally the central panel of a triptych with movable wings that are now lost; these were probably painted on both sides, as demonstrated by the hinges remaining in the original frame. Old copies of the work show the Nativity and Circumcision of Jesus on the wing panels. The central panel has been reduced in size at the top. In 2023, a detailed reconstruction of the missing top portion was completed for an exhibition on van der Goes' work at the Gemäldegalerie, Berlin. A detailed description of the process and a photograph of the result are included in an article by museum curator Dr. Stephan Kemperdick .

== History ==
The work takes its name from a convent in Monforte de Lemos, in northern Spain, where it is presumed (from the dates of copies made in Flanders) to have arrived in the early 16th century; before that its history is unknown. The dating to c. 1470, early in van der Goes' short active career is based on stylistic considerations.

It was offered on the London art market in 1910 (though still in Spain) and acquired by Wilhelm von Bode and Max Jakob Friedländer for the Gemäldegalerie in 1914, after Friedländer went to Spain to view it and the Spanish government finally agreed to its export. The purchase caused a dispute between Friedländer, whose attribution to the then little understood van der Goes was based on similarities to his Portinari Altarpiece in Florence, and the leading art historian Heinrich Wölfflin. Wölfflin's formalist approach made him think the painting was much too late to be by van der Goes, and from the 16th century. It is now generally accepted that the work is by van der Goes, though its style is indeed very advanced for its date.

Among other works clearly influenced by the painting is the Adoration of the Kings by Jan Gossaert (1510–15) in the London National Gallery, which uses some of the figures and broad elements of the composition.

== Description ==
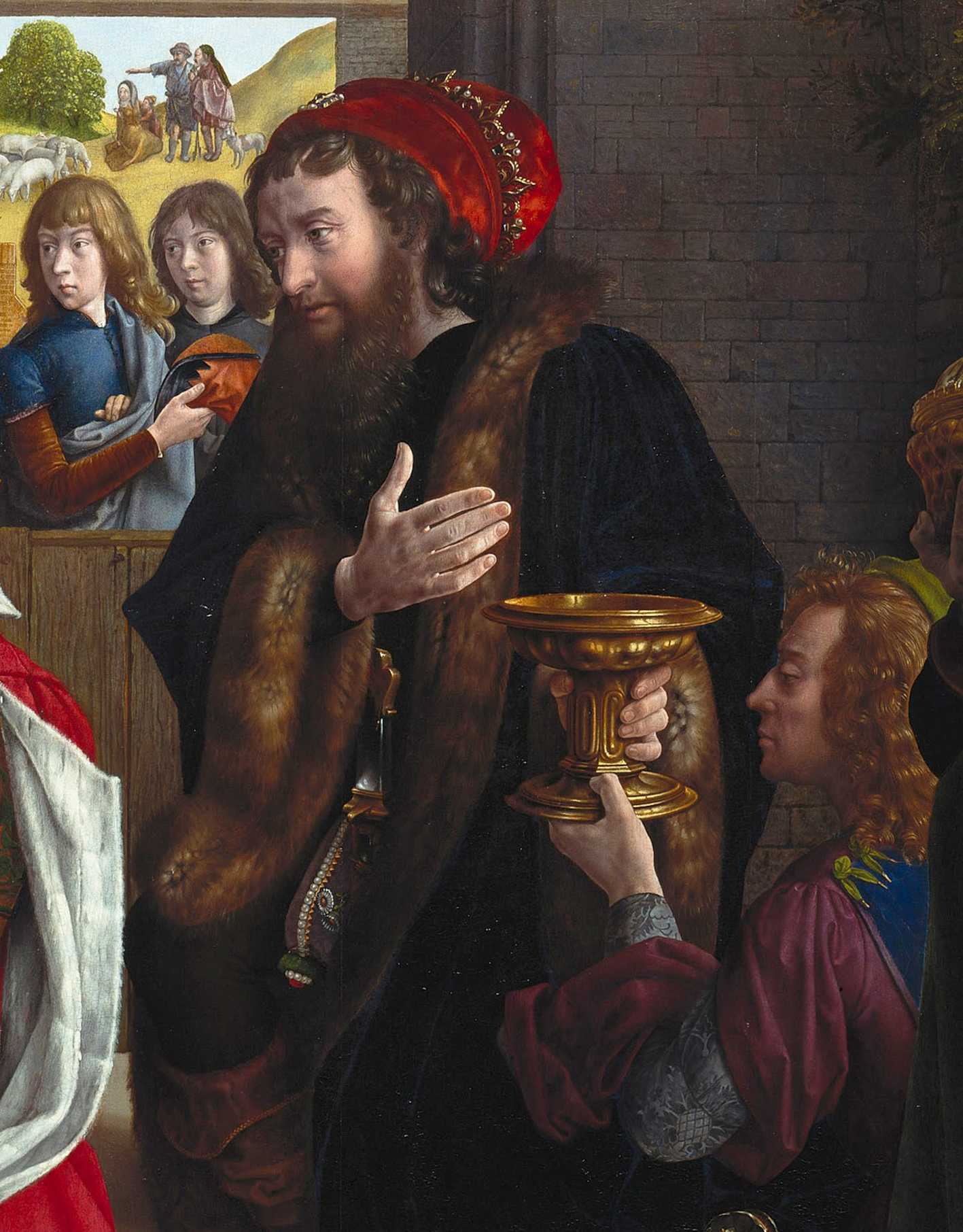
Detail of the second king

The panel depicts Mary with the Child on her womb, subject of the adoration of the three Magi. One of the latter, with a flashing red mantle, is kneeling in front of her; his crown with fur edges lies on the ground next to him, together with a container full of gold coins. Joseph, behind Mary, is perhaps pointing at them with an amazed expression.

Behind the first king are another one, also kneeling and aged, and a younger one standing, with black skin. The former, who has a hand on his chest while another is catching the gift, wears a crown above a red velvet beret, and has a fur-lined hood which partially hides a sword hilt. His garments are completed by a saddlebag decorated by two pearls and two daisies. The last king is already holding his gift; he is also dressed sumptuously, including the spurs, and is accompanied by three servants.

In the background are several shepherds, including a bearded one with a fur hat decorated by feather, who could be the artist's self-portrait. All the characters' glances converge on the baby Jesus, who, instead, looks towards the observer.

As usual in early Netherlandish art, the ground in the lower part is painted in wide angle perspective. Symbolic details scattered in the picture include an iris flower at left and a small still life with a bowl, a pot, a wooden spoon and a piece of bread in a wall niche. At left is a landscape with the Magi procession, with several buildings and lake where grooms and horses are resting. Another portion of landscape is in the middle part, with two shepherds pointing at something, an aged woman and a child: the latter characters could be a reference to St. Elizabeth and the young St. John the Baptist visiting Jesus.

In the upper part are two pink and yellow drapes. This is what remains of the angels flying towards the comet, and are now lost; a similar theme appears in Jan Gossaert's Adoration of the Magi.

== See also ==
- 100 Great Paintings, 1980 BBC series
- List of works by Hugo van der Goes

== Sources ==
- Crane, Susan A. ed, Museums and Memory, Cultural Sitings, 2000, Stanford University Press, ISBN 978-0804735643, googlwe books
- Gemäldegalerie Berlin. Prestel. 1998. ISBN 978-3-7913-4071-5.
