= Vienna Diptych =

Painting by Hugo van der Goes

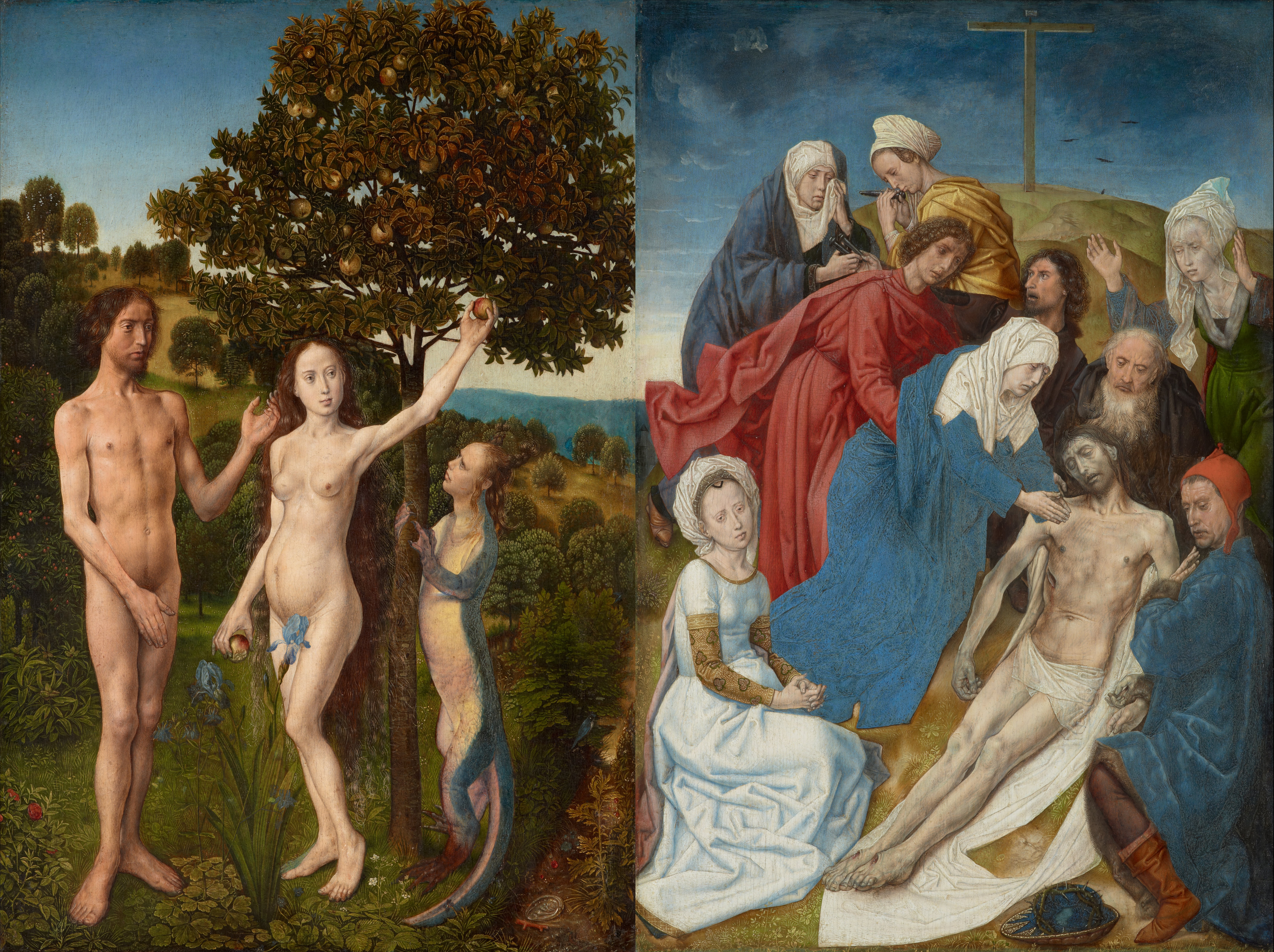
- The Fall of Man (left) / Lamentation (right)
- Artist: Hugo van der Goes
- Year: after 1479
- Medium: Oil on wood
- Dimensions: 32.2 cm × 21.9 cm (12.7 in × 8.6 in)
- Location: Kunsthistorisches Museum, Vienna

The Vienna Diptych or the Fall and Redemption of Man is a religious diptych by the Flemish artist Hugo van der Goes depicting the fall of man on the left panel and the lamentation of Christ on the right panel. Painted in the second half of the 15th century, the diptych is housed in the Kunsthistorisches Museum, Vienna. According to Wolfgang Kermer, who also described the work in detail in its condition in 1967, the diptych is unique in the history of diptych painting in terms of its subject matter (antithesis: Fall of Man / Redemption).

The tempting Serpent is depicted as a bipedal salamander-like creature because it was assumed that the serpent could walk before God's curse compelled it to crawl and eat dust. The human-headed Serpent was introduced into art in the late 13th century. Subsequent Renaissance artists generally abandoned the depiction of Serpent as a human-headed creature.

The reverse side of the left panel has an image of Saint Genevieve painted on it. The reverse side of the right panel bears traces of a coat of arms, consisting of a shield with a black eagle and two supporters, of which only the feet survived. The coat of arms was painted in the 17th century and indicates possible House of Habsburg ownership of the diptych.

== See also ==
- List of works by Hugo van der Goes
