= Hugo van der Goes =

Flemish painter (c. 1430/1440–1482)

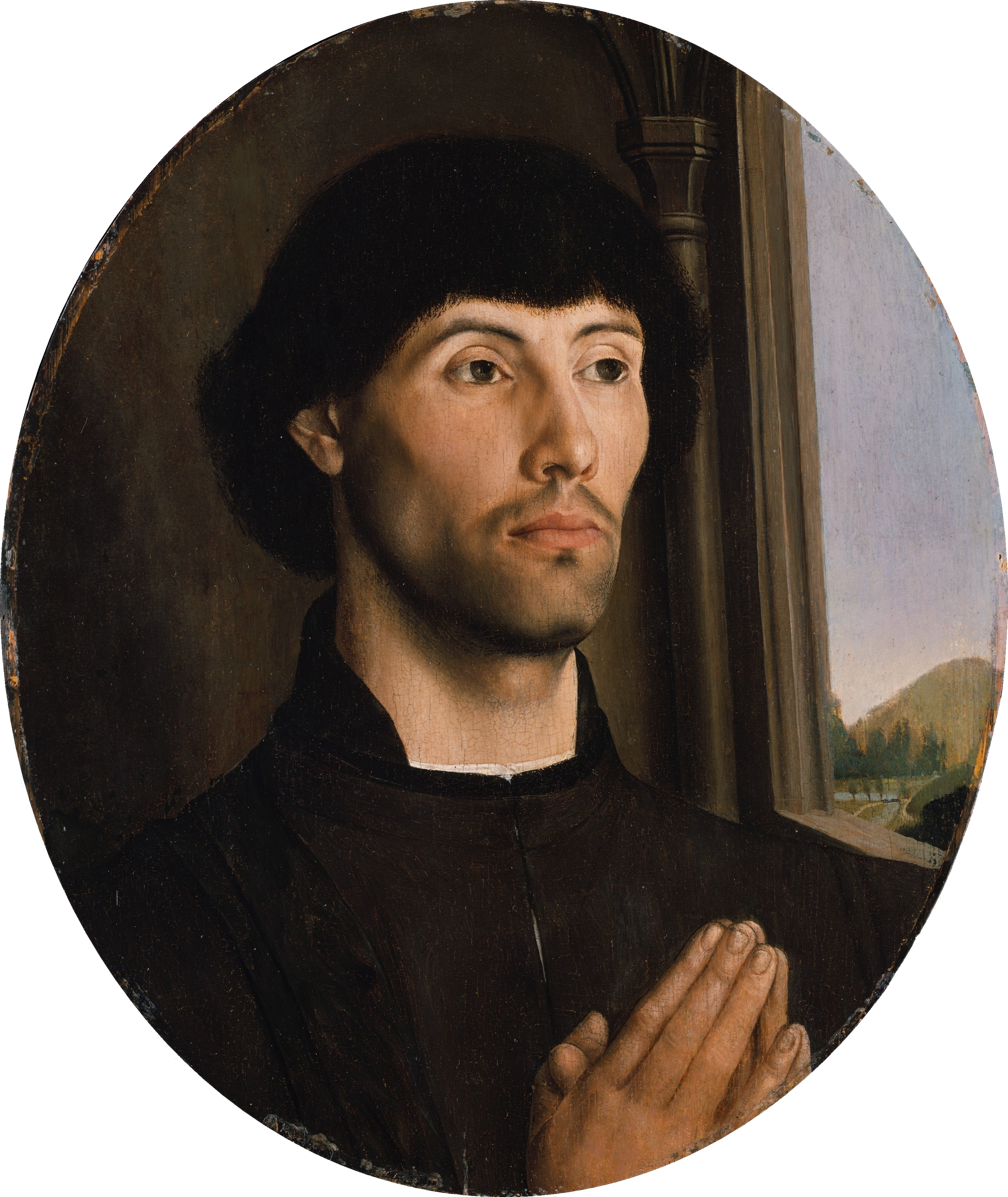
- Portrait of a Man by Van der Goes
- Born: c. 1430/1440 probably Ghent
- Died: 1482 (aged 42 to 52); Auderghem
- Notable work: Portinari Triptych; Monforte Altarpiece; Fall and Redemption of Man
- Movement: Early Netherlandish painting, Northern Renaissance

Hugo van der Goes (c. 1430/1440 – 1482) was a Flemish painter who was one of the most significant and original Early Netherlandish painters of the late 15th century. Van der Goes was an important painter of altarpieces as well as portraits. He introduced important innovations in painting through his monumental style, use of a specific colour range and individualistic manner of portraiture. From 1483 onwards, the presence of his masterpiece, the Portinari Triptych, in Florence played a role in the development of realism and the use of colour in Italian Renaissance art.

== Life ==
Hugo van der Goes was likely born in Ghent or in the vicinity of Ghent around the year 1440. Nothing is known with certainty about the artist's life prior to 1467, the year in which he became a master in the painters' guild of Ghent. The sponsors for his membership of the guild were Joos van Wassenhove, master painter in Ghent from 1464, and Daneel Ruthaert. It is likely that he had trained elsewhere before he became a master in Ghent. Some historians have suggested that Dieric Bouts was possibly the master of van der Goes but there is no independent evidence for this.

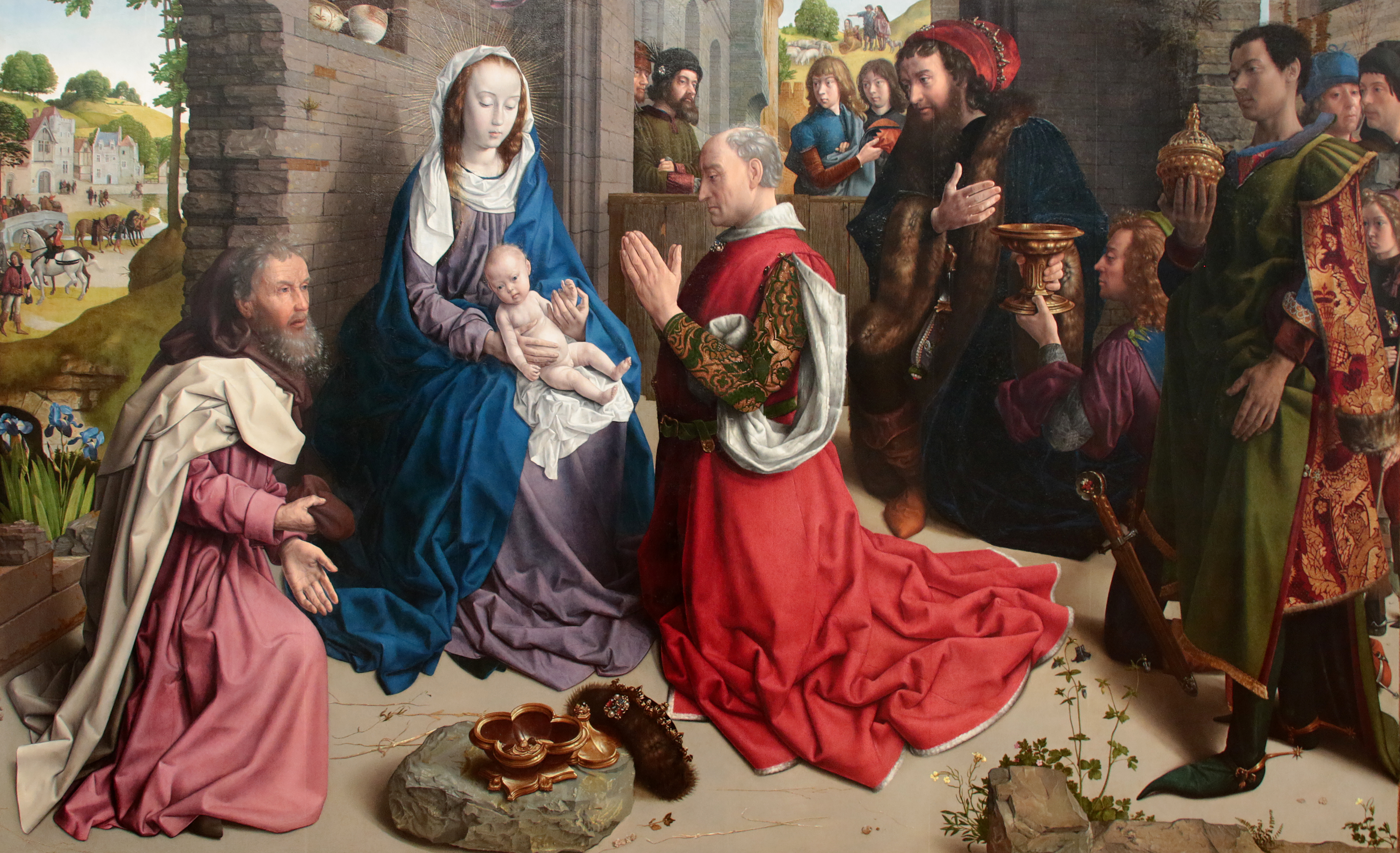
The Adoration of the Kings (Monforte Altarpiece)

In 1468 the artist was commissioned by the city of Ghent to execute some works in connection with the grant of the Great Indulgence of the city. More commissions from the city in the following years required van der Goes to create decorations for events such as papal blazons. In 1468 he was in the town of Bruges making decorations to celebrate the marriage between Charles the Bold and Margaret of York. Hugo van der Goes is recorded again on 18 October 1468 when he and other members of Ghent's painter's guild hosted painters from nearby Tournai at the guild's assembly in Ghent to celebrate St. Luke's day together. St. Luke was the patron saint of painters.

In 1469 Hugo van der Goes and Joos van Wassenhove vouched for Alexander Bening for his entry as a master in the painter's guild of Ghent. Alexander Bening married Catherina (Kathlijn) van der Goes, a cousin or sister of Hugo van der Goes, in 1480. The artist and his workshop worked on commissions of the city of Ghent to provide heraldic decorations for Charles the Bold's Joyous Entry in Ghent in 1469 and later in 1472.

When in 1470 Joos van Wassenhove left Ghent for Italy to become the court painter of Federico da Montefeltro, the Duke of Urbino, van der Goes became the leading painter in Ghent. In 1467 the Burgundian court had paid van der Goes for creating the blazons used at Philip the Good's funeral. The painter was repeatedly elected as deacon of the painter's guild of Ghent and served as its deacon from 1474 to 1476.

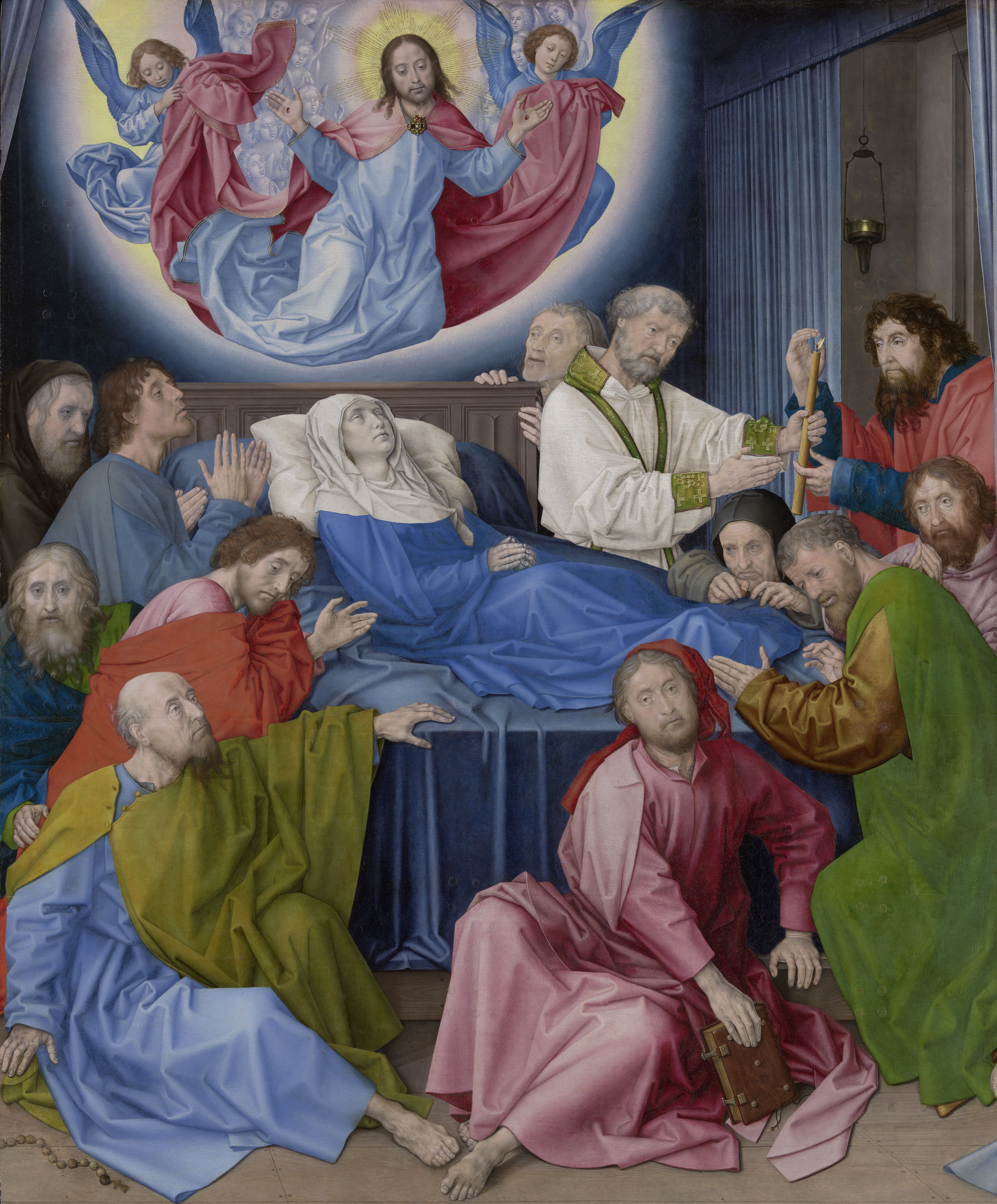
Death of the Virgin

It was during this period that Hugo van der Goes painted the Adoration of the Magi (also known as the Monforte Altarpiece (Gemäldegalerie, Berlin)) and worked on the commission of Tommaso Portinari for the Portinari Altarpiece (Uffizi, Florence), which arrived at its destination in Florence only in 1483, when the artist had already died.

Van der Goes achieved considerable success and secured important commissions from the Burgundian court, church institutions, affluent Flemish bourgeoisie and associations of Italian business people based in the Burgundian Netherlands. When he had reached the peak of his career in 1477 van der Goes suddenly decided to close down his workshop in Ghent to become a frater conversus (i.e. a lay brother) at the monastic community of the Rood Klooster (or Rooklooster) near Auderghem (now in Brussels). The Rood Klooster was part of the monastic wing of the Modern Devotion movement and belonged to the Windesheim Congregation. At the monastery he enjoyed certain privileges. He was allowed to continue working on painting commissions and to drink wine. According to the chronicle written up in Latin some time between 1509 and 1513 by Gaspar Ofhuys, a fellow monk in the Rood Klooster, van der Goes received visits by eminent persons including Archduke Maximillian.

During his time at the cloister he received in 1482 a request from the counsel of the City of Leuven to value the works for the Leuven city hall that Dieric Bouts had left unfinished at the time of his death. As a reward for this service van der Goes received a jug of Rhine wine from the city authorities. It is believed that it was van der Goes who completed Bouts' unfinished Triptych for Hyppolite Berthoz. His contribution was the painting on the left panel of the portraits of the couple who had paid for the triptych. In 1482 the monastery sent van der Goes to Cologne together with his half-brother Nicolaes, who had also taken religious vows, and another brother of the monastery. On the return leg of this trip the artist suffered an acute depression and declared himself to be damned. He made a suicide attempt. His companions brought him back to Brussels and then to the Rood Klooster. After a brief recovery, he died not long thereafter in the Rood Klooster.

There is speculation that anxiety about his artistic achievements may have contributed to his madness, for 'he was deeply troubled by the thought of how he would ever finish the works of art he had to paint, and it was said then that nine years would scarcely suffice'. A report by a German physician, Hieronymus Münzer, from 1495, according to which a painter from Ghent was driven to melancholy by the attempt to equal the Ghent Altarpiece, may refer to Hugo van der Goes.

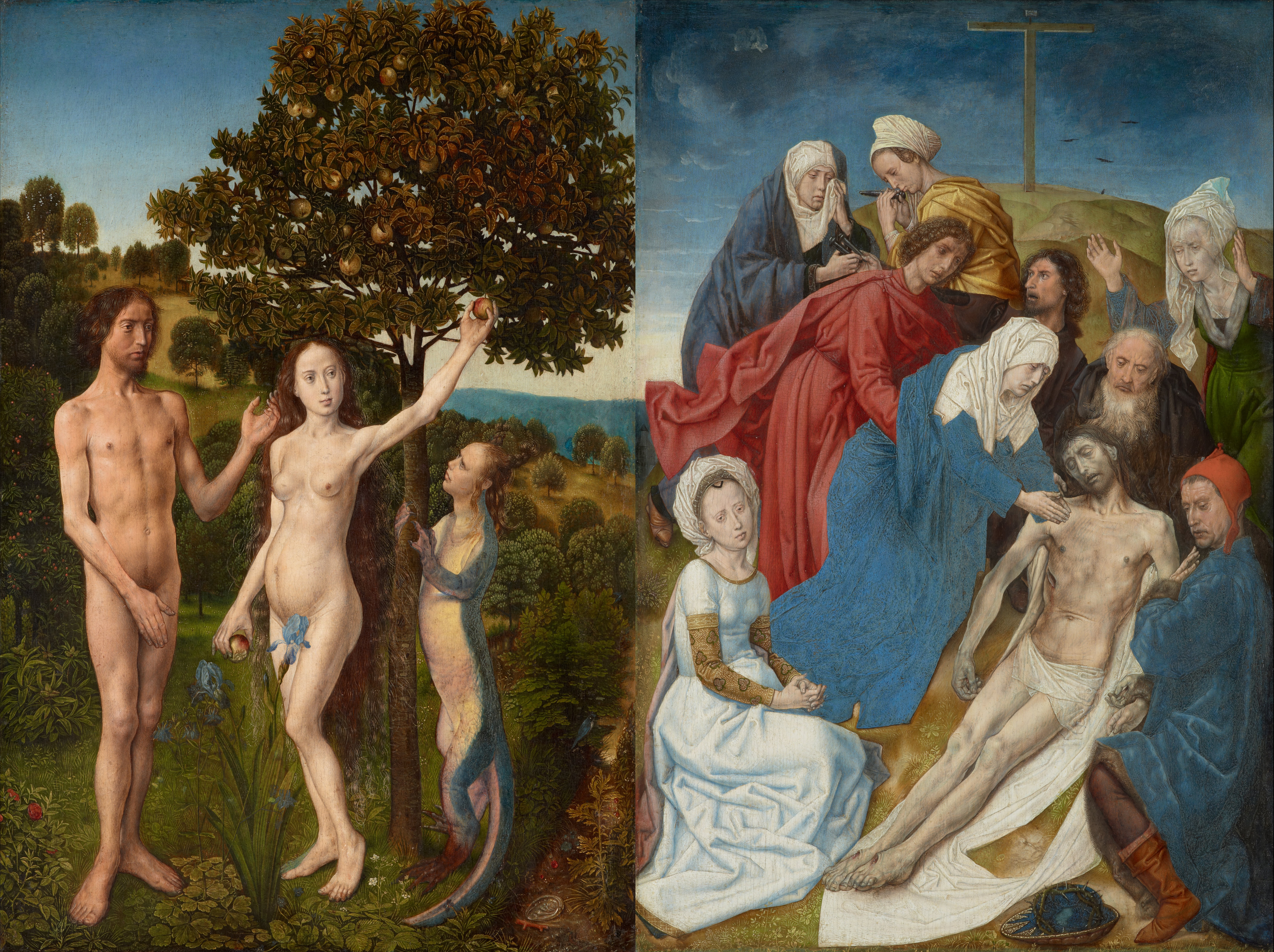
The Fall and Redemption of Man (Vienna Diptych)

The mental breakdown of Hugo van der Goes was only rediscovered in 1863, when the Belgian historian Alphonse Wauters published the information, which he had found in Ofhuys' newly discovered chronicle. Wauters' publication inspired the late Romantic Belgian painter Emile Wauters (a nephew of Alphonse Wauters) to create his 1872 painting Portrait of Hugo van der Goes (1872, Royal Museums of Fine Arts of Belgium). This painting depicts Hugo van der Goes during his period of madness and was so successful that it was awarded a Grand Medal at the Paris Salon. In 1873 the Dutch painter Vincent van Gogh mentioned Wauters' painting in a letter to his brother Theo van Gogh. On two further occasions van Gogh likened his own appearance to that of van der Goes as recreated by Wauters, and stated that he identified emotionally with the 15th-century painter.

== Work ==
=== General ===
Attribution of his work has been difficult for art historians. Many works, which in the early to mid 20th century were believed to be by his hand, are now accepted to be copies by members of his workshop or by followers. In the absence of documentary evidence, attributions have been based on a comparison with his 1470 Portinari Altarpiece (Uffizi, Florence) for which there exists a clear attribution of authorship by van der Goes.

The originals of a large portion of van der Goes's works have been lost. These works only survive through later copies made after these now lost originals. The large number of copies bears witness to the high regard in which he was held and also contributed to his important influence on early Flemish art. Martin Schongauer's prints after van der Goes's works spread the artist's influence across the Flemish borders into Germany. The prominent Bruges painter Gerard David and the assistants in his workshop clearly took their inspiration from the Ghent artist.

Hugo van der Goes was an important painter of altarpieces as well as portraits. His principal religious works include the Portinari Triptych (Uffizi, Florence), the Adoration of the Magi (also called the 'Monforte Altarpiece'), the Adoration of the Shepherds (both Gemäldegalerie, Berlin), the Fall and Redemption of Man (Kunsthistorisches Museum) and the Death of the Virgin (Groeningemuseum, Bruges).

In the 1460s, van der Goes was commissioned to provide an altarpiece for the Church of the Holy Trinity in Edinburgh by its first provost, Edward Bonkil. The church had been founded by Scotland's queen consort, Mary of Guelders. The four surviving panels of the Trinity Altarpiece depict James III, King of Scots, flanked by St. Andrew and his son, the future James IV, and his wife, Margaret of Denmark. The donor, Edward Bonkil, also features.

=== The Portinari Triptych ===
Van der Goes's most famous surviving work is the Portinari Triptych (Uffizi, Florence). The Triptych is an altarpiece commissioned for the church of San Egidio in the hospital of Santa Maria Nuova in Florence by Tommaso Portinari, the manager of the Bruges branch of the Medici Bank.

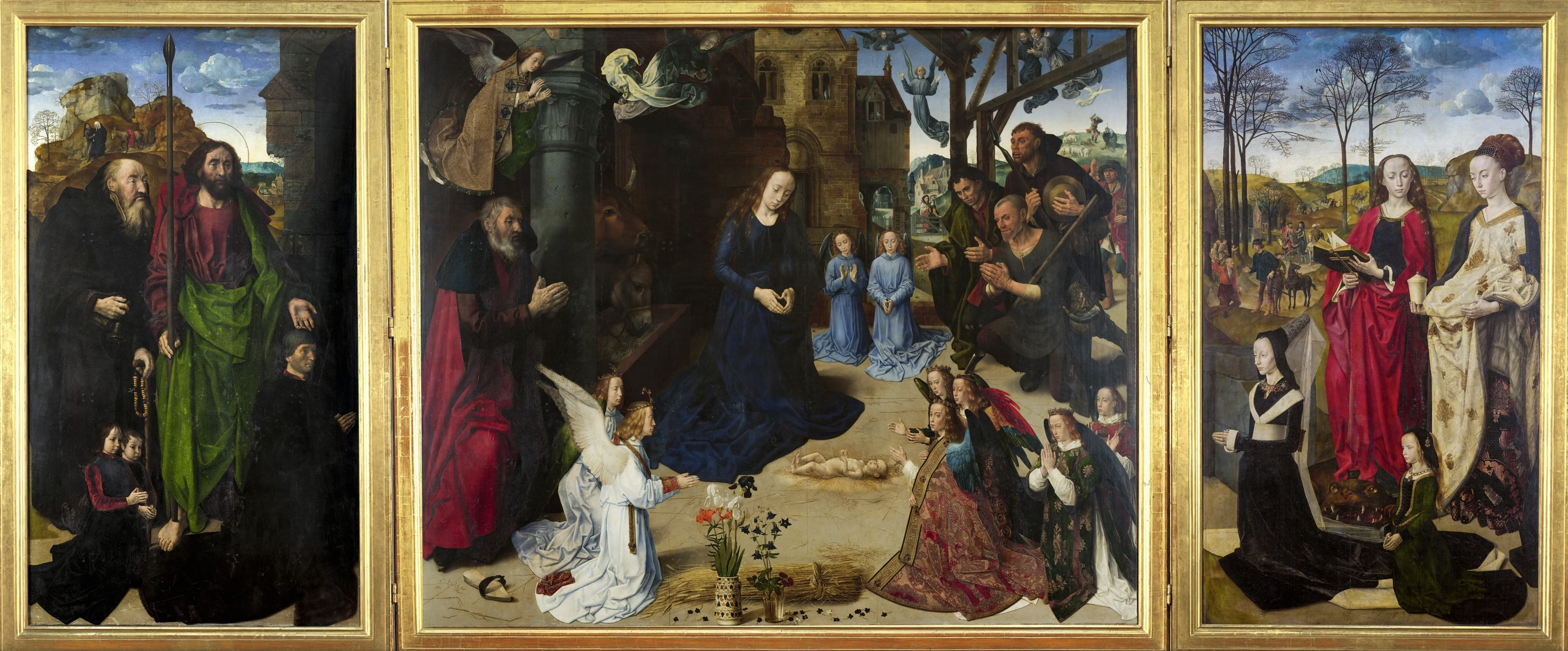
Portinari Triptych

In 1483, apparently some years after its completion by van der Goes, the Portinari Altarpiece arrived in Pisa from which it was shipped via canal to the Porta San Friano in Florence. The altarpiece was hung in the church of the hospital of Santa Maria Nuova.

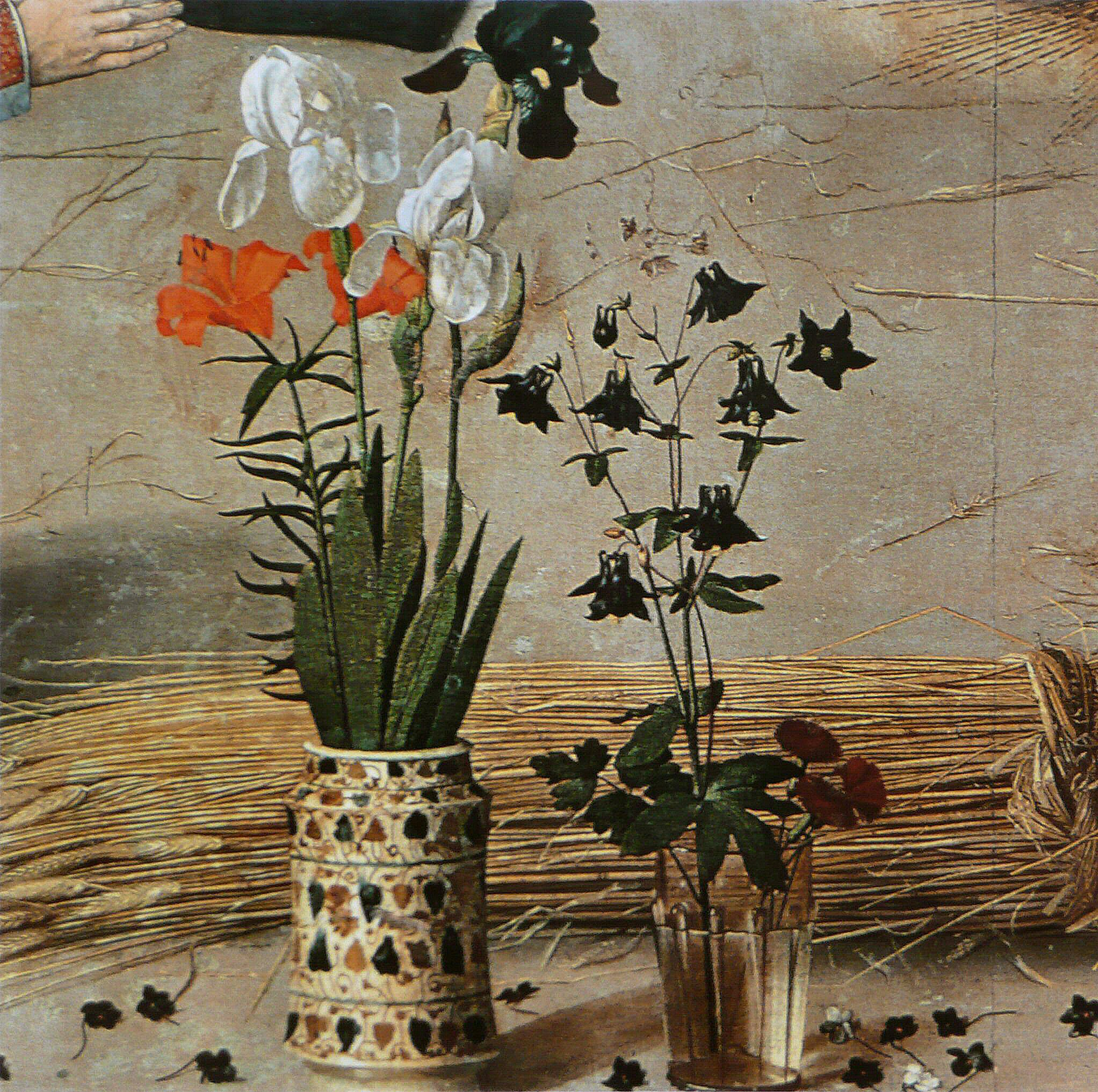
Still life from the Portinari Triptych

The raw features of the shepherds in van der Goes's composition made a deep impression on painters working in Florence. Domenico Ghirlandaio likely drew inspiration from the Portinari Triptych for his Epiphany in the Sasseti chapel. The largest Netherlandish work that could be seen in Florence, it was greatly praised. In his Vite of 1550 Giorgio Vasari referred to it as by "Ugo d'Anversa" ("Hugo of Antwerp"). This is the sole documentation for its authorship by Hugo van der Goes. All other works are attributed to van der Goes based on stylistic comparison with the altarpiece.

After Hugo van der Goes's death the triptych was wrongly attributed to others, including Andrea del Castagno and Domenico Veneziano. These two artists had produced the frescoes around the altarpiece, but were not involved in its design. In 1824, Karl Friedrich Schinkel identified it as the work of Hugo van der Goes. It was not until later that this theory became generally accepted.

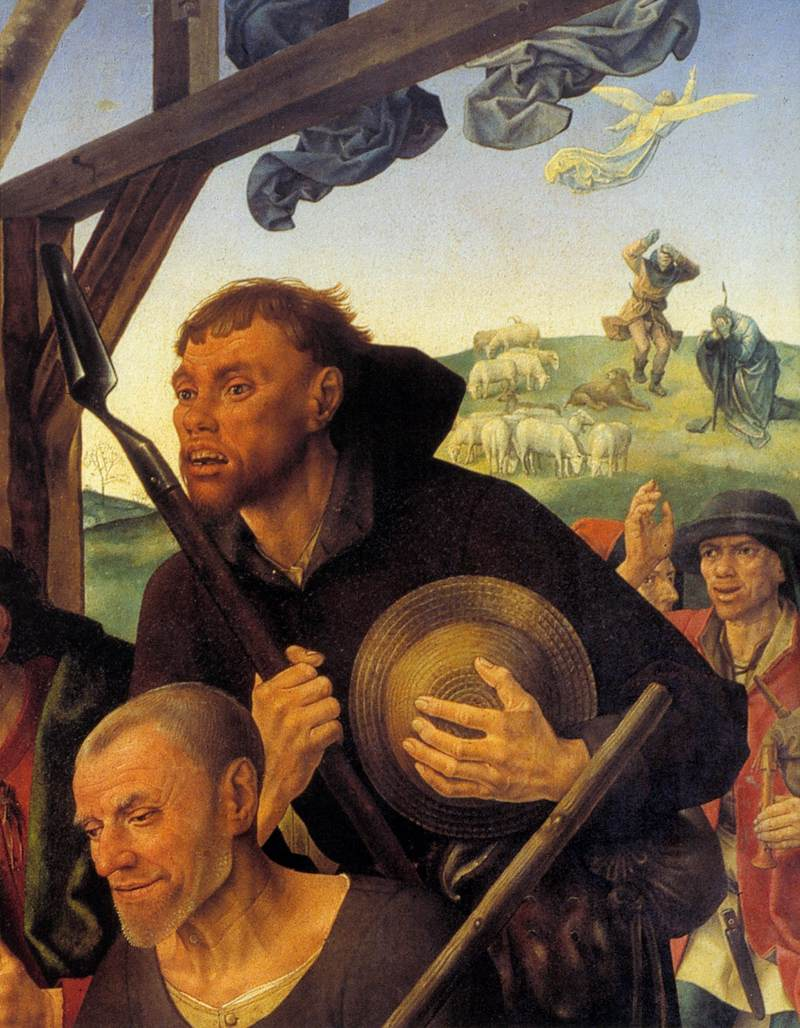
Shepherds from the Portinari Triptych

The central panel of the Portinari Triptych depicts the central Christian myths concerning the birth of the Christian saviour god: the nativity of Jesus, the adoration of the shepherds and the annunciation to the shepherds (in the far right background). Many interpretations of the iconography of the altarpiece have been proposed. The composition emphasizes the devotion to the Eucharist and the passion of Christ. The Eucharist is represented through the angels wearing liturgical vestments and the visual analogy of the sheaf of wheat with the body of Christ. The Passion is represented in the somber expressions of the figures and in the prominently placed flower still life in the foreground, which includes flowers such as a scarlet lily, white and purple irises and carnations. One of the containers in which the flowers are placed is of the albarello type. Albarelli were used as medicinal jars designed to hold apothecaries' ointments and dry drugs and thus reference in the picture the hospital setting (i.e. the hospital of Santa Maria Nuova) in which the altarpiece was to be displayed. Some of the flowers in the flower still life were in the Renaissance also used for medicinal purposes and thus also reference the hospital setting. These references to medicinal powers also allude to the miraculous birth of Jesus, which, according to Christian literature, happened without the usual birth pains. The birth of Jesus itself is also supposed to have healing powers by delivering mankind from the so-called original sin, the Christian doctrine of humanity's state of sin, which resulted from the fall of man.

The side panels depict the male (left wing) and female (right wing) members of the Portinari donor family who commissioned and donated the altarpiece. The right wing also includes a scene of the annunciation to the Magi and the left wing a scene of the journey of Mary and Joseph to Bethlehem.

=== Portraits ===
Hugo van der Goes is regarded as one of the most significant portrait artists of 15th-century Europe. At that time portraiture was gaining importance in art because of the renewed importance attached to the individual fostered by the rise of humanism.

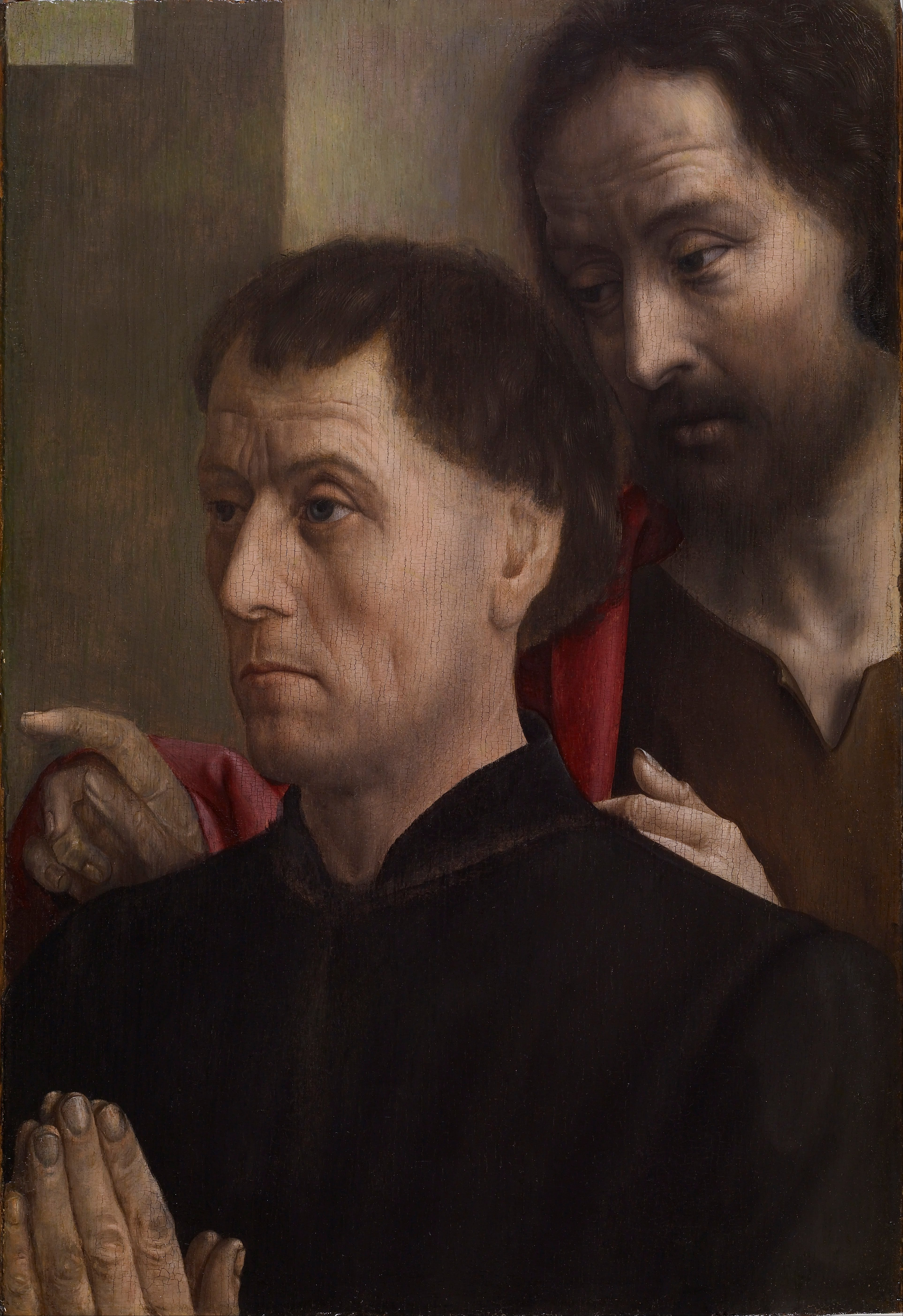
Portrait of a Man at Prayer with St John the Baptist

No independent portraits by Hugo van der Goes have survived. His achievements in this genre are only known by the donor portraits included in his devotional diptychs and triptychs. Examples are the left wing of the Saint Hippolytus Altarpiece, the central and right panels of which are by Dieric Bouts (c. 1475, Groeningemuseum, Bruges), the Portinari Alarpiece, the Trinity Altarpiece (between 1473 and 1478, Scottish National Gallery, Edinburgh) and the fragments of altarpieces such as the Portrait of a Man at Prayer with St John the Baptist (Walters Art Museum) and the Portrait of a Man. The portraits included in these devotional works typically depicted a man or woman in prayer, who appear to be experiencing some vision, often of the Virgin Mary.

The Portrait of a Man (c. 1475, Metropolitan Museum of Art, New York) is a good example of his portrait work. This small panel was cut down to its current oval shape from its original rectangular format. It formed likely the right wing of a small altarpiece known as a diptych, which is only made up of two panels. Alternatively, a portrait of the sitter's wife may have been painted on a panel on the right of a central panel depicting a Christian scene, so that as a whole the artwork formed a conventional triptych. The Christian scene was likely a depiction of the Virgin and Child. In the Portrait of a Man van der Goes demonstrated his skills as a portrait painter through his ability to bring out the sitter's resolute bearing and strength of character. He achieved these effects by placing the sitter on a higher level than the viewer and by creating a contrast between the face that catches the light from outside and the dark wall behind it.

Van der Goes used chiaroscuro effects to further accentuate the modeling of the facial features, which appear to be made of stone. These features as well as the appearance of the hands and background after they were painted over by later restorers may explain why scholars previously attributed this male portrait to the Italian painter Antonello da Messina. The stark realism of Hugo van der Goes's approach, with its meticulous rendering of the dark tones in the man's face, the stubble on his chin and his rough hands joined in prayer, creates the impression that the sitter of the portrait was gripped by a strong feeling of devotion.

The donor portrait of Hippolyte de Bertohoz on the left wing of the Saint Hippolytus Altarpiece and Edward Bonkil's head painted on the right wing of the Trinity Altarpiece show a similar realism in the treatment of portraits by van der Goes. The Portrait of a Man at Prayer with Saint John the Baptist (Walters Art Museum) shows similar traits. As at the time the display of strong emotion in public was frowned upon, Hugo van der Goes resorted in this work to the most subtle facial expressions to express his sitters' mental state. In the Portrait of a Man at Prayer with Saint John the Baptist the deep concentration of the sitter is suggested in a subtle manner in the raised eyebrow and tense muscles around his mouth.

== Stylistic development ==
Van der Goes is regarded as one of the most original and innovative early Netherlandish artists. As many works of van der Goes have not survived and most of the surviving works cannot be dated accurately, it is difficult to establish a stylistic development for van der Goes. The Portinari Altarpiece is the sole of his works that can be confidently linked to the artist.

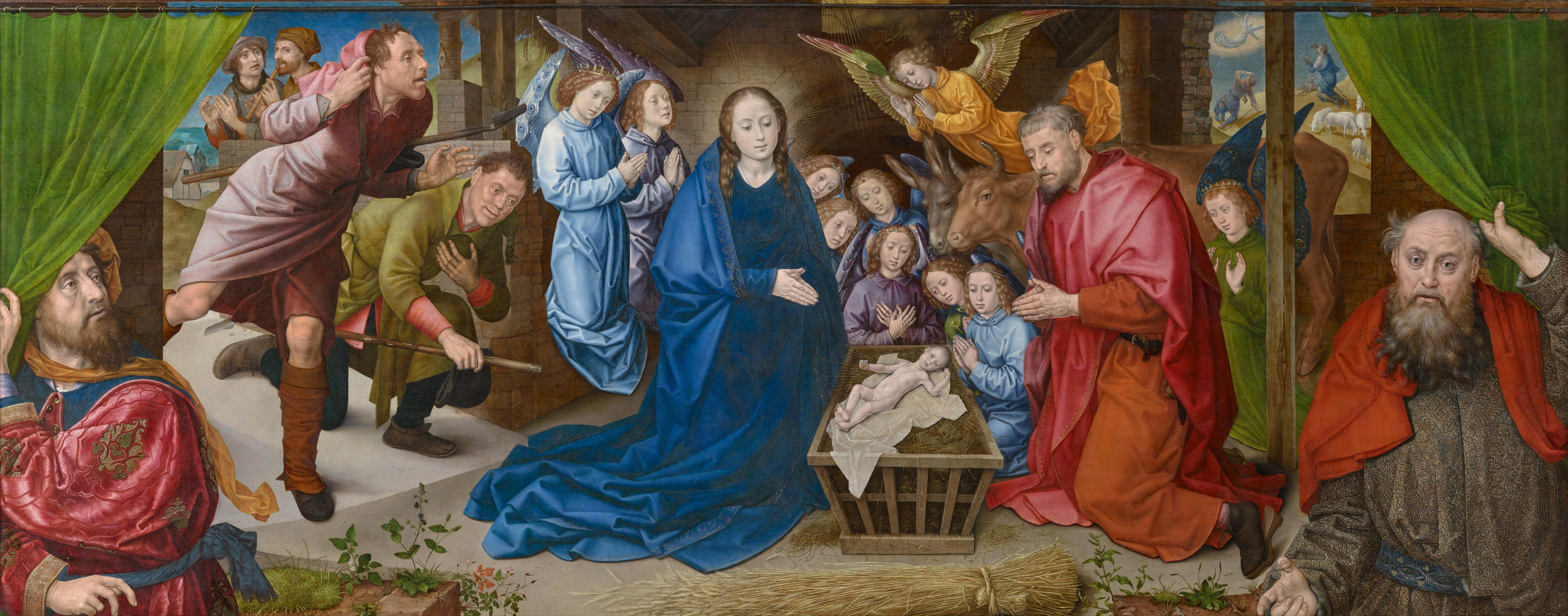
Adoration of the Shepherds

Even so, art historians see a global development starting with a style close to the illusionism of van Eyck. This early style was characterised by a detailed description in rich colour and a single vanishing-point perspective as can be observed in the Monforte Altarpiece and Portinari central panel. Van der Goes may have learnt this style from Petrus Christus or Dieric Bouts.

Later works gradually abandoned illusionism for an increased emphasis on the artificiality of the picture as created image, divorced from reality. This effect was achieved by the use of a limited range of colours and the expressive distortion of figures as well as space. Example of works in this later style are the Death of the Virgin (Groeningemuseum, Bruges) and the Adoration of the Shepherds (c. 1480, Gemäldegalerie, Berlin). Other characteristics imputed to these later works are a breakdown of space, a renunciation of still-life elements not directly related to the subject matter and an exaggerated agitation and an excess of expression in the figures. Early scholars saw the evolution as a reflection of the increasing mental instability of the artist. Later interpretations gave much weight to the artist's adherence to the Modern Devotion movement as an important influence. These interpretations see the later paintings as attempts by van der Goes to translate the ideas of this movement into a visual medium. In particular the movement's emphasis on meditation is seen as playing a key role in the artist abandoning illusionism.

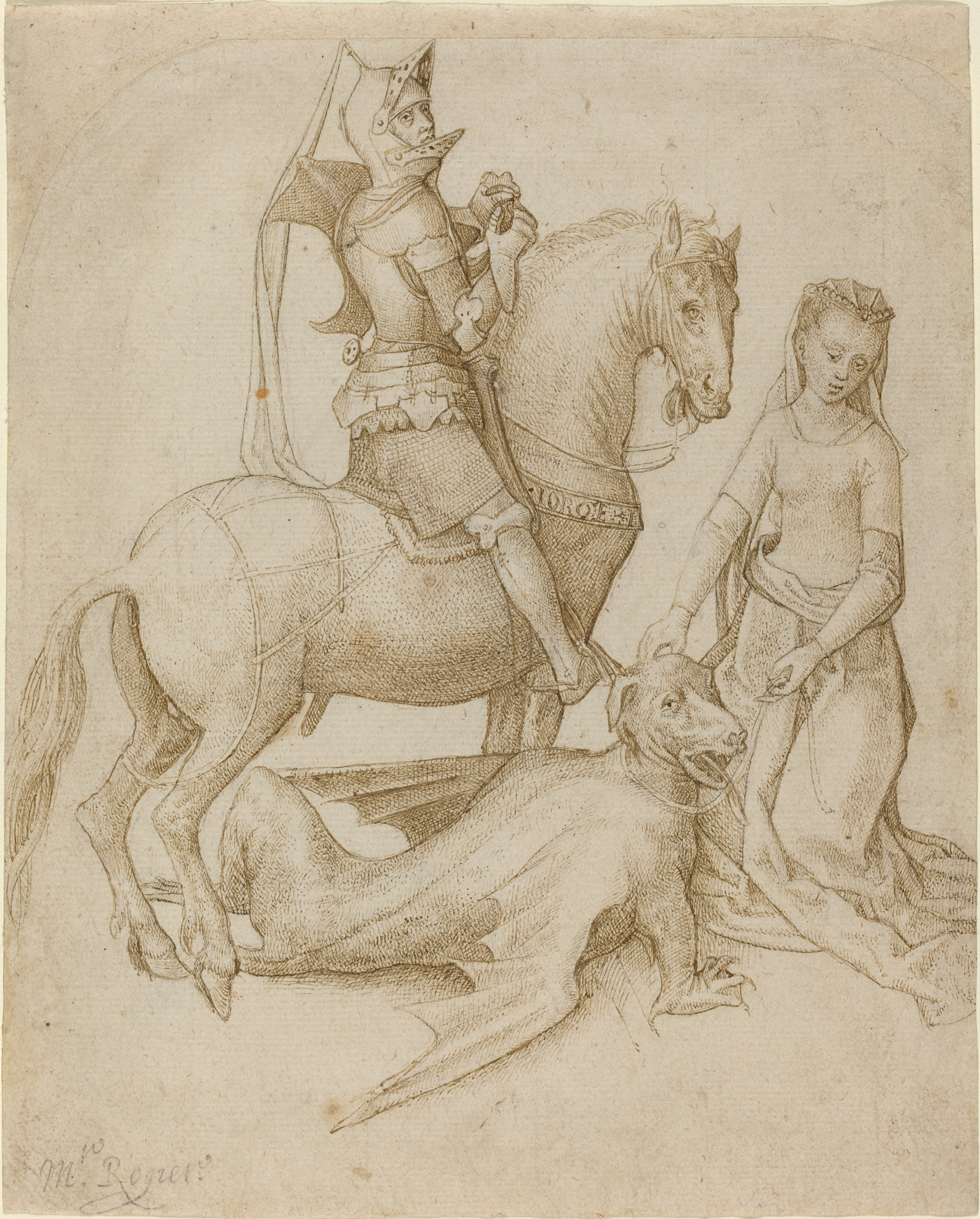
Saint George and the Dragon

The muted coloring of the late Adoration of the Shepherds seemed to support the interpretation of a stylistic evolution away from illusionism. A recent restoration of the Adoration has provided new visual evidence, which contradicts the earlier reading as it revealed that rather than muted the painting was bright and strongly illusionistic.

Not all scholars agree there was a stylistic development in van der Goes's work. Some insist that his career of only 15 years was too short to allow for a development to be distinguished. Other scholars regard van der Goes as an artist with an ability to create in the same period and even within a single composition very different types and styles of work. They maintain that van der Goes had the flexibility and range to use or discard techniques whenever they suited his purpose.

=== Drawings ===
Hugo van der Goes left a large number of drawings. These drawings or the paintings themselves were used by followers to produce large numbers of copies of compositions from his own hand that are now lost. After van der Goes's death, the book illustrator Alexander Bening, who was married to a niece of van der Goes, likely came in the possession of van der Goes's drawings and patterns. Simon Bening, the son of Alexander Bening, is believed to have introduced these drawings in Bruges later on since compositions by van der Goes appear in an illustrated book of hours created by the Ghent-Bruges school of illuminators.

A drawing of Jacob and Rachel preserved at the Christ Church Picture Gallery, Oxford is thought to be a rare surviving autograph drawing by van der Goes. It was possibly a preliminary study for a stained glass window.
