= Portinari Altarpiece =

Triptych by Hugo van der Goes

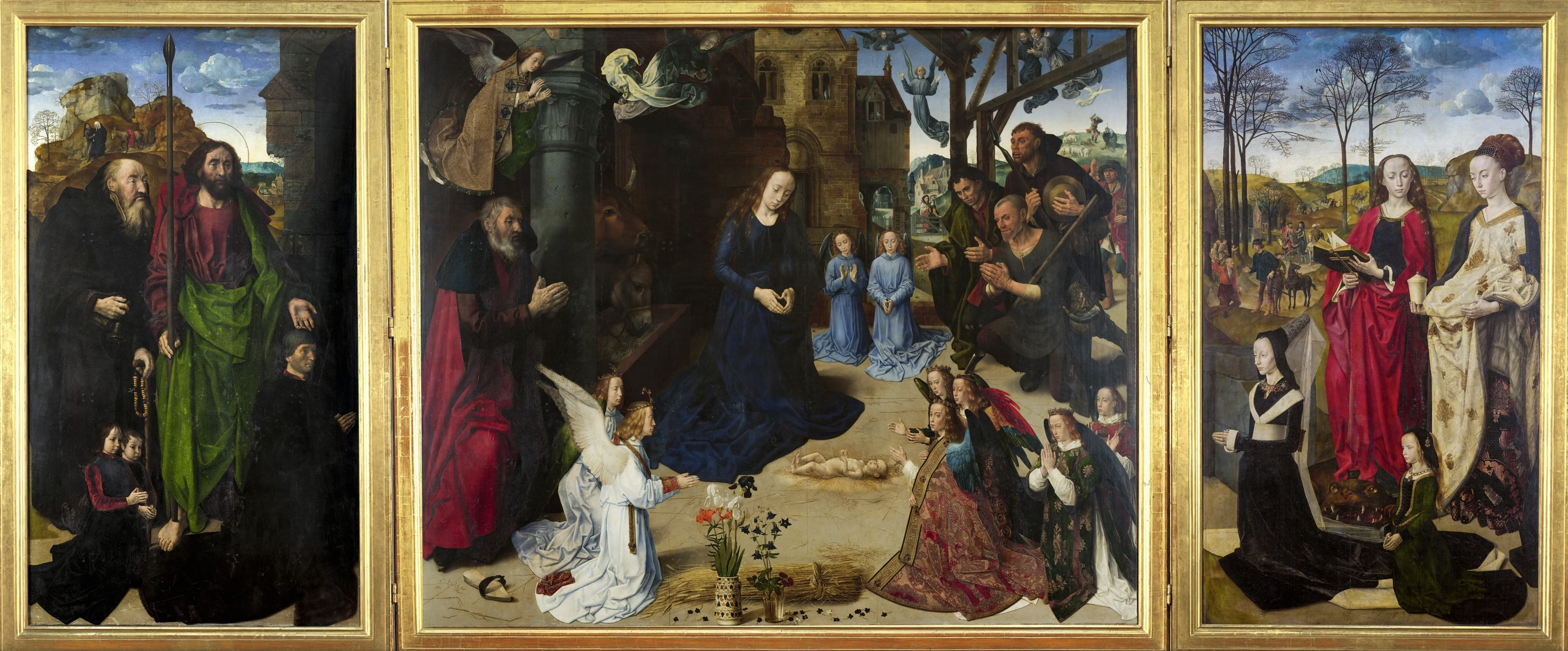
- Artist: Hugo van der Goes
- Year: 1475–1476
- Medium: Oil on wood
- Location: Uffizi Gallery, Florence

The Portinari Altarpiece or Portinari Triptych (c. 1475) is an oil-on-wood triptych painting by the Flemish painter Hugo van der Goes, commissioned by Tommaso Portinari, representing the Adoration of the Shepherds. It measures 253 x 304 cm, and is now in the Galleria degli Uffizi in Florence, Italy.

This altarpiece is filled with figures and religious symbols. Of all the late-fifteenth-century Flemish artworks, this painting is said to be the most studied.

== History ==
The work was commissioned for the church inside of one of the largest hospitals in Florence, hospital of Santa Maria Nuova by the Italian banker Tommaso Portinari, a descendant of the hospital's founder. Portinari lived for more than forty years in Bruges as a representative for the Medici family's bank. Portinari himself is depicted on the left panel with his two sons Antonio and Pigello; his wife Maria di Francesco Baroncelli is shown on the right panel with their daughter Margarita. All, except Pigello, are accompanied by their patron saints: Saint Thomas (with the spear), Saint Anthony (with the bell), Mary Magdalen (with the pot of ointment) and Saint Margaret (with the book and the dragon). When the work arrived in Florence in 1483, it was installed in the Portinari family chapel where it was deeply admired by the Italian artists who saw it, many of whom sought to emulate it. A good example is the Adoration of the Shepherds (1485) which Domenico Ghirlandaio painted for the Sassetti Chapel in the church of Santa Trinita in Florence. However, the naturalistic depiction of the shepherds is already present in Andrea Mantegna's Adoration of the Shepherds (Metropolitan Museum, New York), which dates from around 1450.

== Patron ==
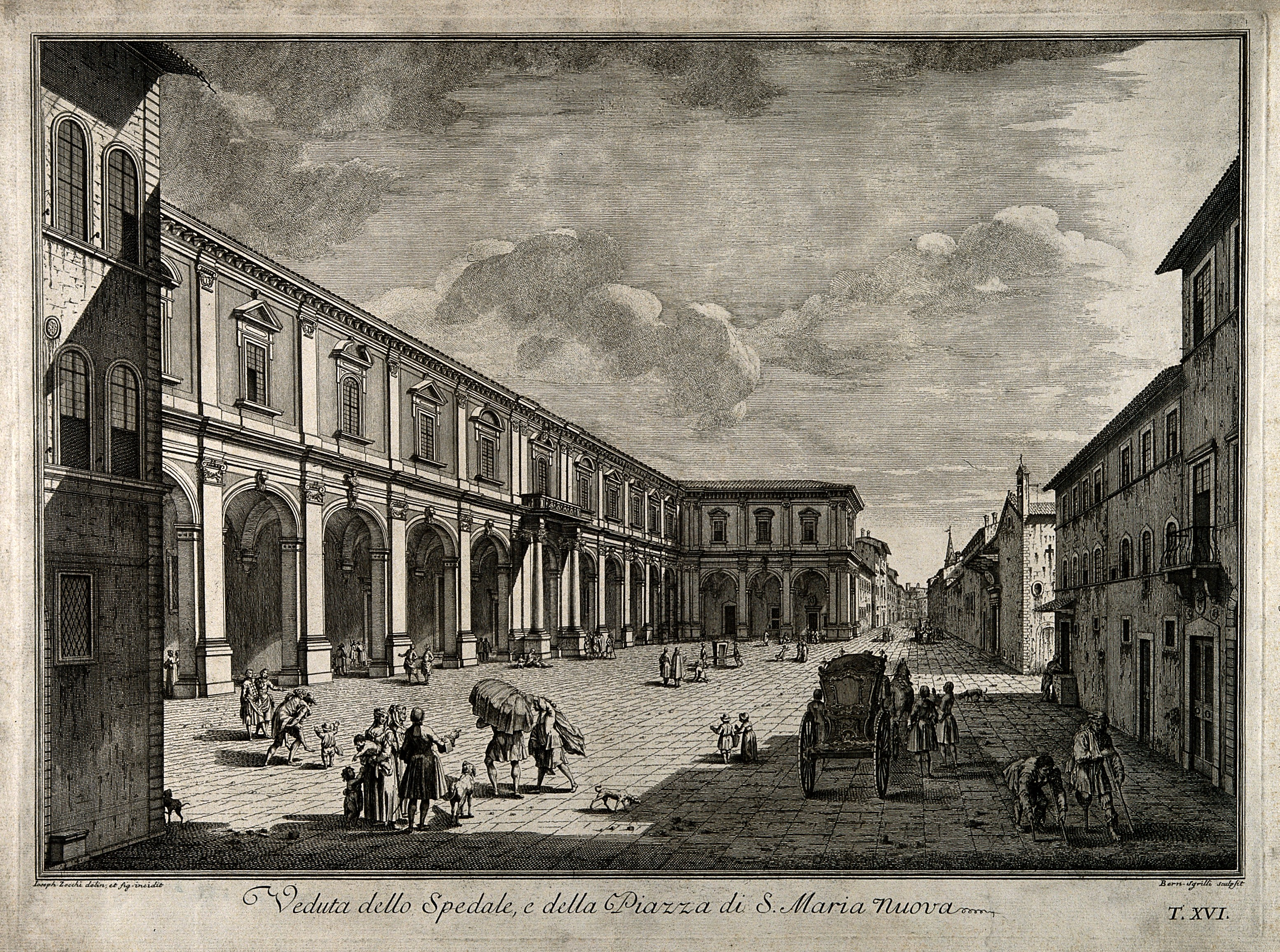
Hospital of Santa Maria Nuova, Florence, Italy. Etching by B Wellcome V0014713

The hospital of S. Maria Nuova in which the altarpiece was originally held, was built in 1285 by Folco Portinari. The hospital was founded with only twelve beds and by the fifteenth century it grew to house around two hundred of them. Because of the hospital's prestige and growth, the hospital became well known throughout Florence as well as many other cities in Europe. The hospital was built for charitable purposes, but later became part of the Portinari legacy that created honor for the family and its generations to come after Folco.

The timing of the commission for the Portinari altarpiece was during the peak of Tommaso Portinari's career while in Bruges around the 1470s. The enormous size and choice of artist of this altarpiece is a statement of the patron's wealth and power.

== Description ==
In the central panel, three shepherds fall to their knees before the child Jesus. Van der Goes painted these rustic characters very realistically. Kneeling angels surround the Virgin and the Child, who is not in a crib but lies on the ground surrounded by an aureole of golden rays. This unusual representation of the adoration of Jesus is probably based on one of the visions of Saint Bridget of Sweden.

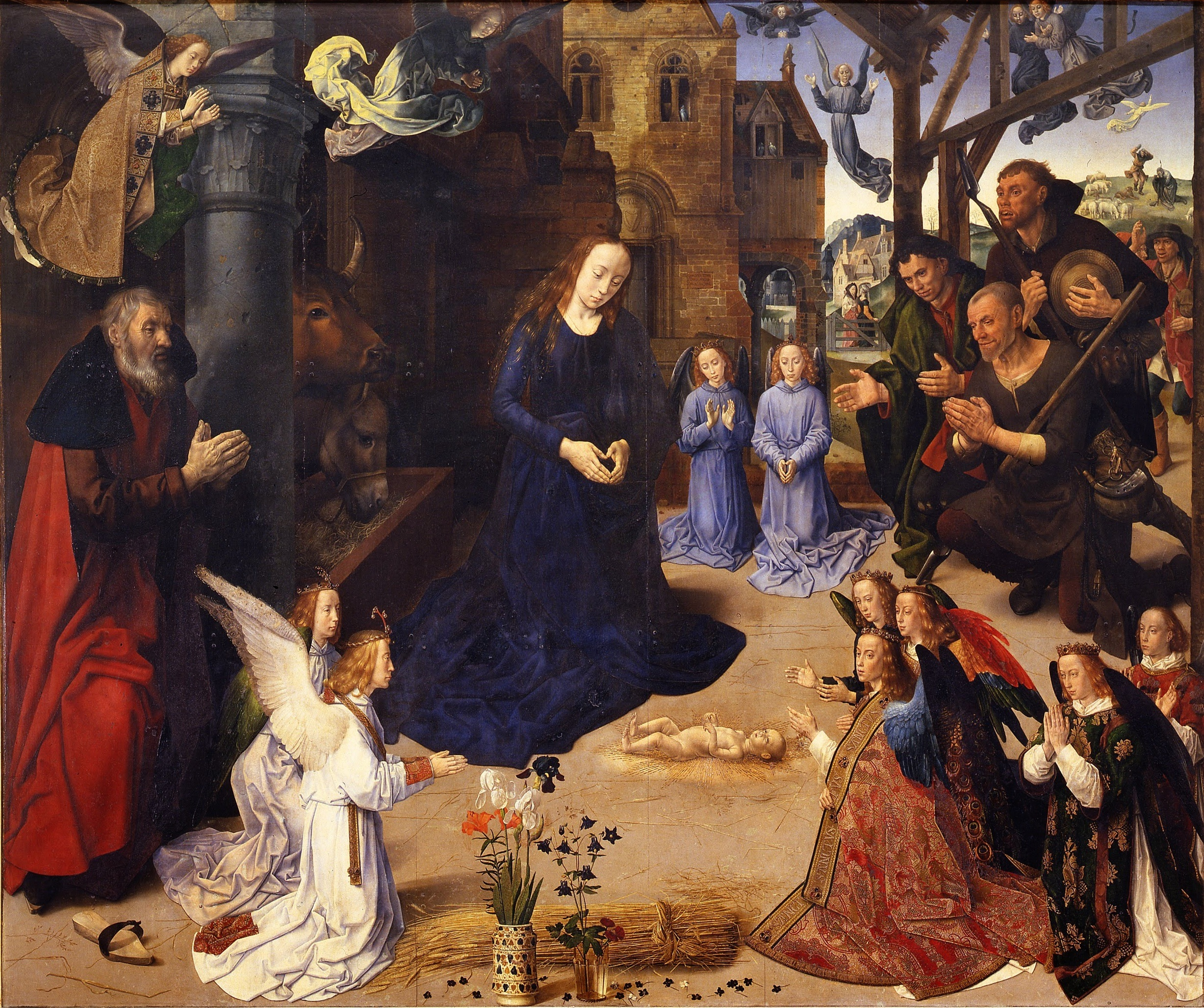
The central panel

In the background, van der Goes painted scenes related to the main subject: on the left panel, Joseph and Mary on the road to Bethlehem; on the central panel (to the right), the shepherds visited by the angel; on the right panel, the Three Magi on the road to Bethlehem. Hugo van der Goes used continuous narrative to show the same characters repeated in one painting. In the central panel, he sets the characters up in the background first. Here, the shepherds are seen with an angel over their heads. This scene is the Annunciation of the Shepherds where the angel comes to tell the shepherds of the news of Christ's birth. In the foreground of the central panel, the shepherds are seen now adoring Christ across from the Virgin Mary.

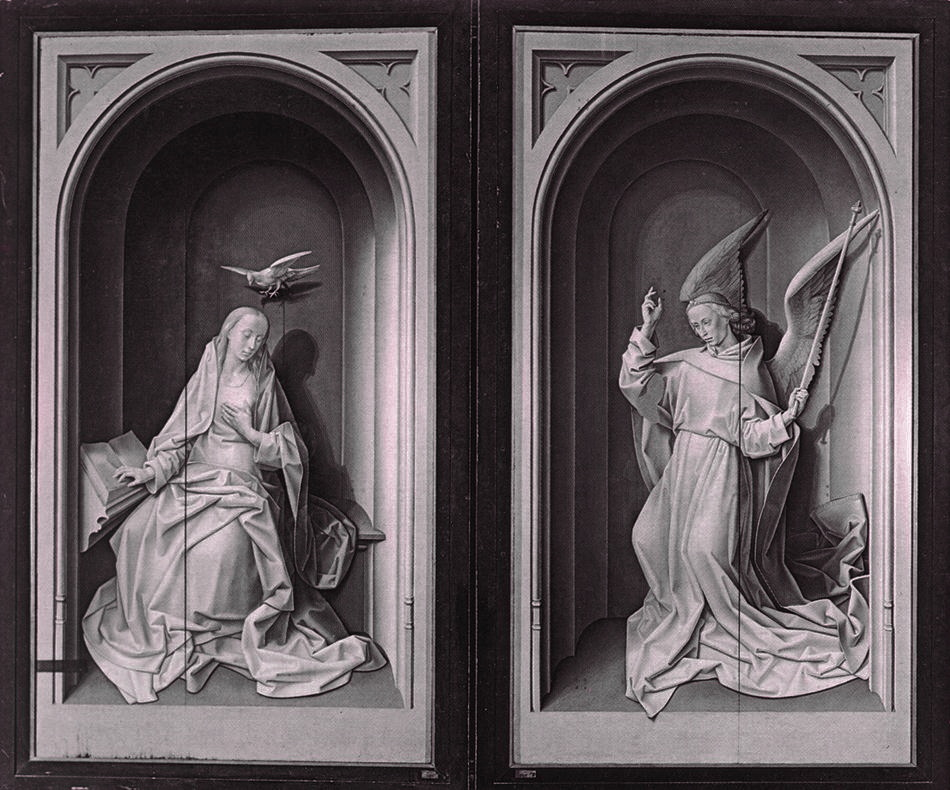
The Annunciation in grisaille on the closed wings

Because most triptych altarpieces are usually kept unopened, the Portinari Altarpiece would have been closed except for special occasions such as holidays and feast days when it would have been opened. The exterior of Hugo van der Goes's triptych has decorative depictions of the Annunciation scene. The artist Hugo van der Goes painted the figures of the Virgin Mary and of the Angel Gabriel in grisaille, meaning to paint it in a style that imitates sculpture. The two figures are placed in shallow niches. During the completion of this work in the Netherlands, to depict grisaille on the exterior of altarpieces was a tradition for artists. This tradition came from the Middle Ages, when sculpture was considered the chief medium for devotional art. In the fifteenth and sixteenth centuries, some places in Germany continued to see sculpture as superior and that it belonged in the middle of a folding altarpiece like the one by Van der Goes.

It was more economical for a patron to have an artist like Hugo van der Goes who could create a painting and a sculpture with paint itself. This allowed the patron to only have to contract the artist instead of multiple craftsmen. This also helped Van der Goes because the entire commission could be kept for the artist and his assistants. Another concept that was popular during the time of Hugo van der Goes was depicting the scene of The Annunciation on the exterior of the triptych while the scene from the life of Christ would be in the interior of the altarpiece once the panels were opened since The Annunciation gave way for the Incarnation of Christ.

== Symbolism ==
Hugo van der Goes's Altarpiece is considered to have some of the most complicated and hidden symbolism in any Nativity scene from the fifteenth century. The scenes of the Nativity and the Adoration of the Shepherds are seen in the central panels of the triptych, whereas in the background to the right side, is the scene of the Annunciation of the Shepherds.

There are certain symbols in the painting that represent the devotion of the Eucharist. The angels in the central panel wear liturgical vestments. Those liturgical vestments are the same ones worn during the first Solemn High Mass by the assistant ministers. In the upper left part of the central panel as well as the lower right corner, are two angels wearing the liturgical cope that is worn traditionally by the archpriest in a first Solemn High Mass. There are two angels on the righthand side of the angel who is on his knees. Those two angels wear a Dalmatic cope, which is a short sleeved garment with slits going up the side. The Dalmatic is usually worn in Solemn High Masses by a Deacon or Subdeacon. In a Solemn High Mass, a linen alb is worn under the vestments of every assistant minister. The same linen alb is worn by every angel in the painting. The angel who is kneeling at the bottom left of the frame, wears a linen alb and a stole. The angel behind him, wears only the alb. The liturgical vestments of the angels together with the sheaf of wheat—also found in the central panel, create a symbol for the Eucharist. The vestments of the angels are created so that whoever is gazing at this altarpiece, is reminded of the holy sacrament that took place at the altar, where the triptych altarpiece would have been placed. There are two structures that symbolize the Old Testament coming to an end once the arrival of Christ comes, the old shed on the right and the Romanesque architecture to the left are starting to deteriorate. The column near the shed is thought to have been a support for Mary while she as giving birth. The ox and ass also have religious significances. The ox represents the Church the one who accepted Christ; its head is raised in recognition of Christ while the ass tilts his head downward representing the way the people who worshiped In the Jewish Synagogue lived in blindness against Christ.

Dressed in a red robe is Joseph, the husband of Mary. In front of Joseph and behind the white cloaked angels is a clog or sandal. The sandal symbolizes the removal of a shoe before entering a holy place or stepping on sacred ground. Therefore, the ground in which Joseph is stepping on, the ground on which the Christ child lays, is holy.

The symbollic flowers in the foreground include scarlet lilies and white and purple irises representing the Passion, violets for humility, three red carnations that symbolize the three nails on the cross and columbines that represent the Holy Spirit. The flowers are held in an albarello lusterware ceramic. A vessel like this was known to be used as an apothecary jar to store and carry herbs, spices, and other organic compounds with therapeutic qualities. All the depicted flowers have medicinal properties.

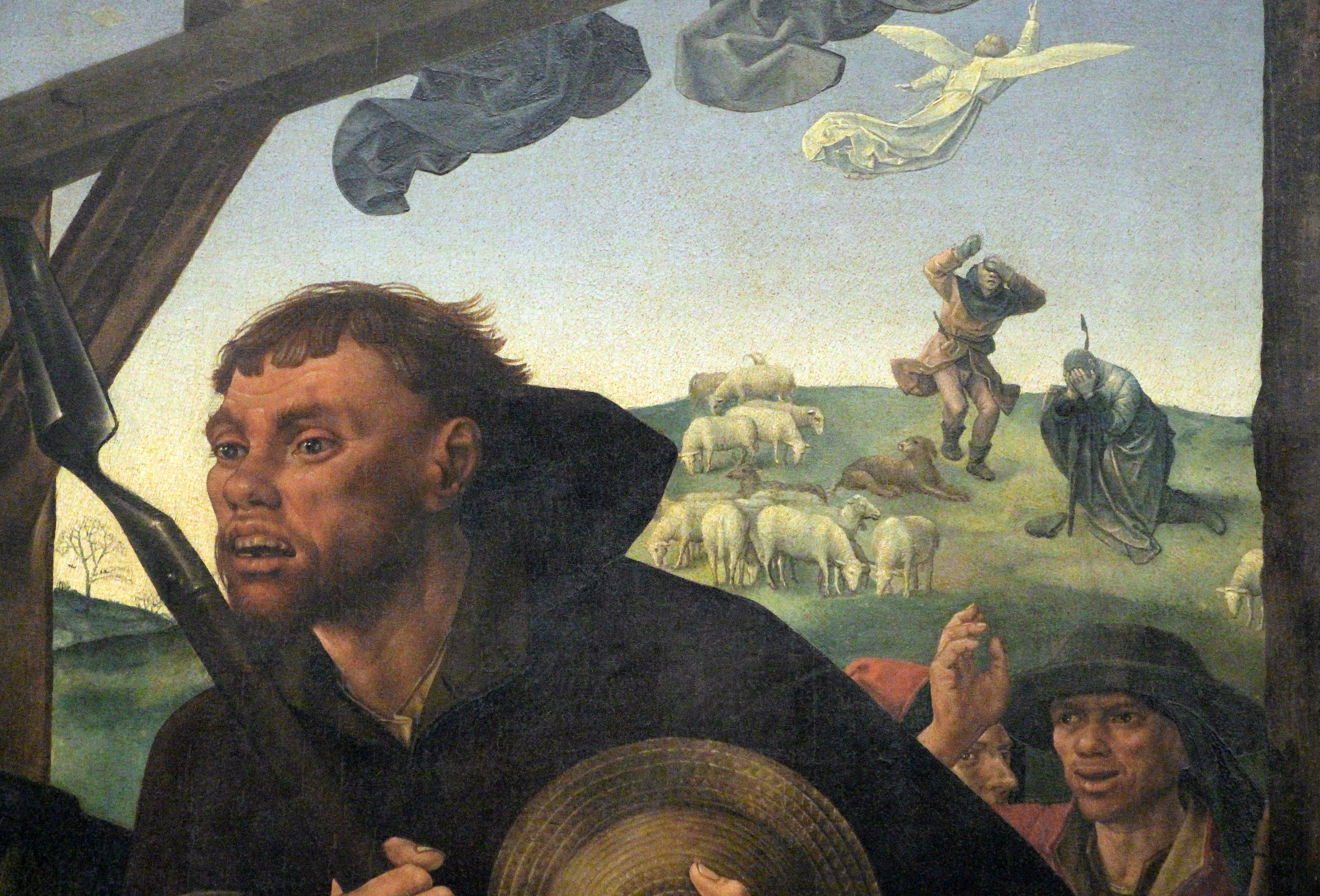
The Annunciation of the Shepherds in the top right corner of the central panel

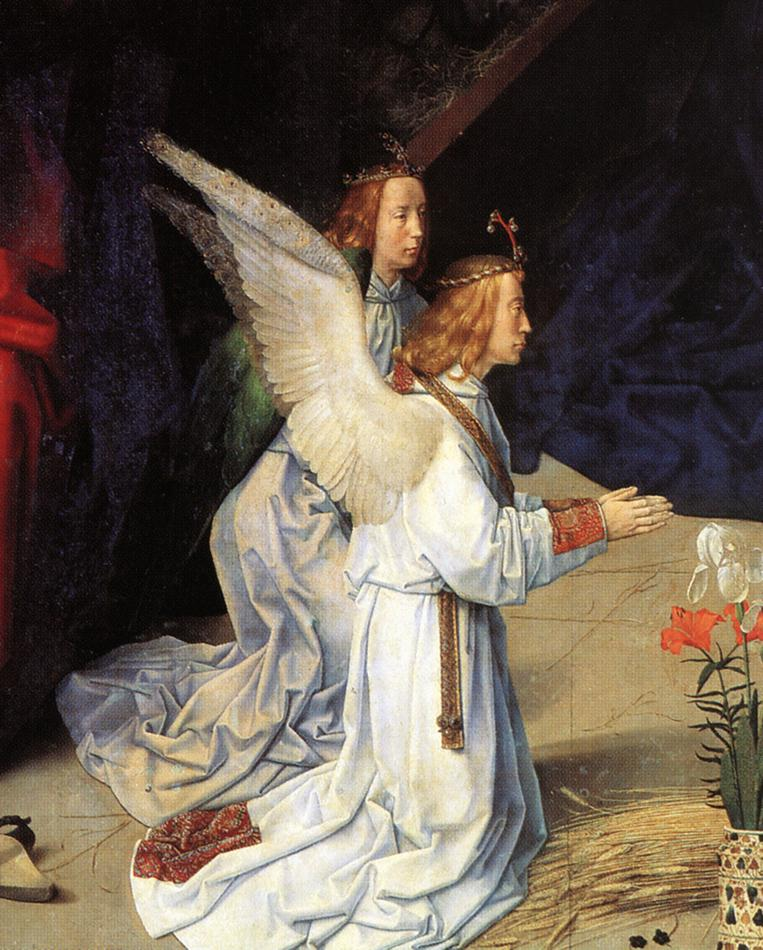
Angel wearing linen alb

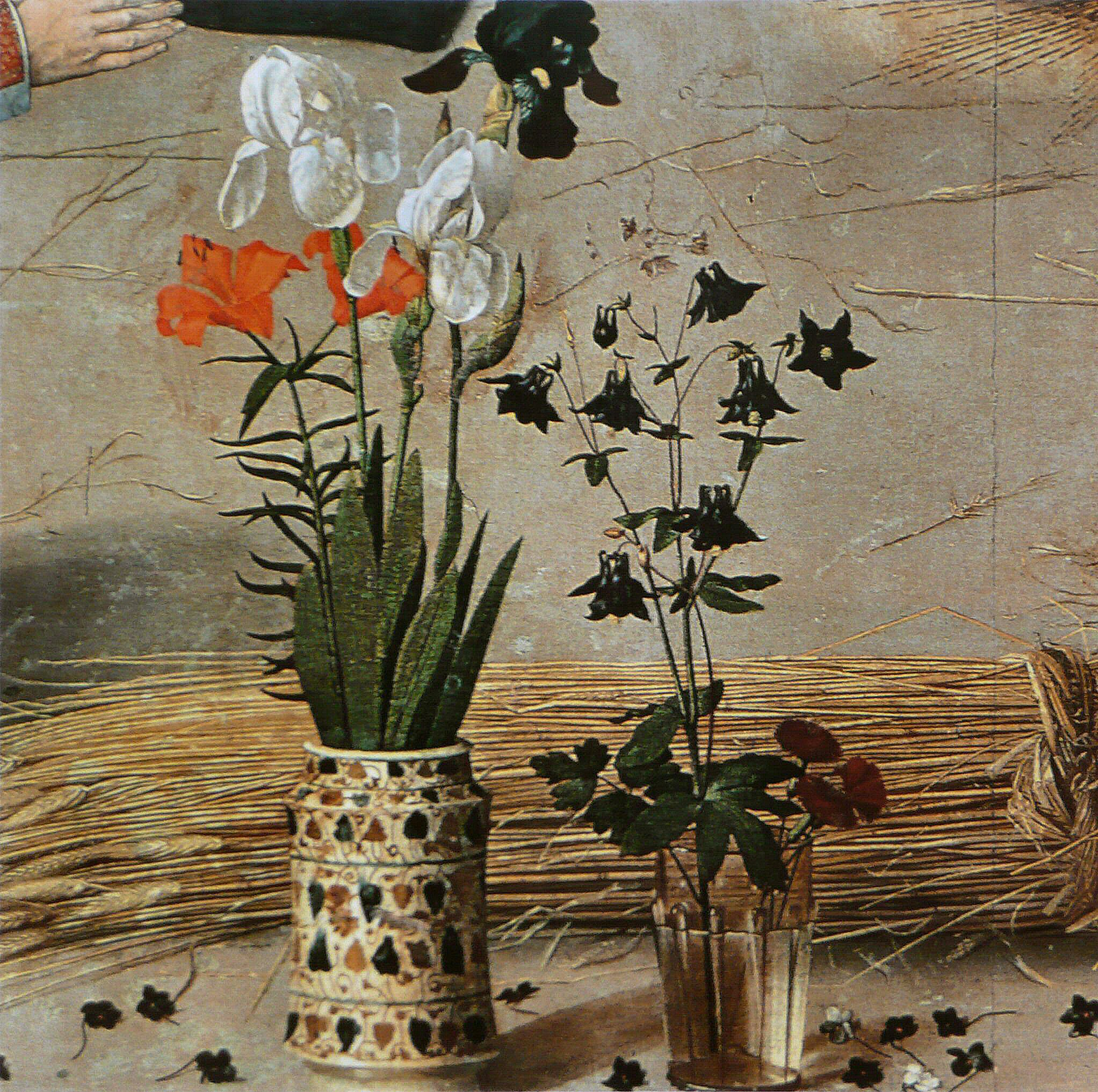
Details of the flowers within the arbarello lusterware ceramic

== See also ==
- List of works by Hugo van der Goes

== Sources ==
- Various authors (2003). Galleria degli Uffizi. Florence.
