= Death of the Virgin (disambiguation) =

The Death of the Virgin is a common subject in Christian art, depicting the death of the Virgin Mary.

Death of the Virgin may also refer to:

- Death of the Virgin (Christus), a 1460–1465 painting by Petrus Christus
- Death of the Virgin (Mantegna), a 1462–1464 painting by Andrea Mantegna
- Death of the Virgin (van der Goes), a 1472–1480 painting by Hugo van der Goes
- Death of the Virgin (Anonymous), a 15th-century oil painting on a panel
- Death of the Virgin (Caravaggio), a 1606 painting by Caravaggio
- The Death of the Virgin (Rembrandt), a 1639 print in etching and drypoint by Rembrandt
- The Death of the Virgin (Bruegel), a 1564 painting by Pieter Bruegel the Elder
