= Death of the Virgin (Anonymous) =

15th-century oil painting

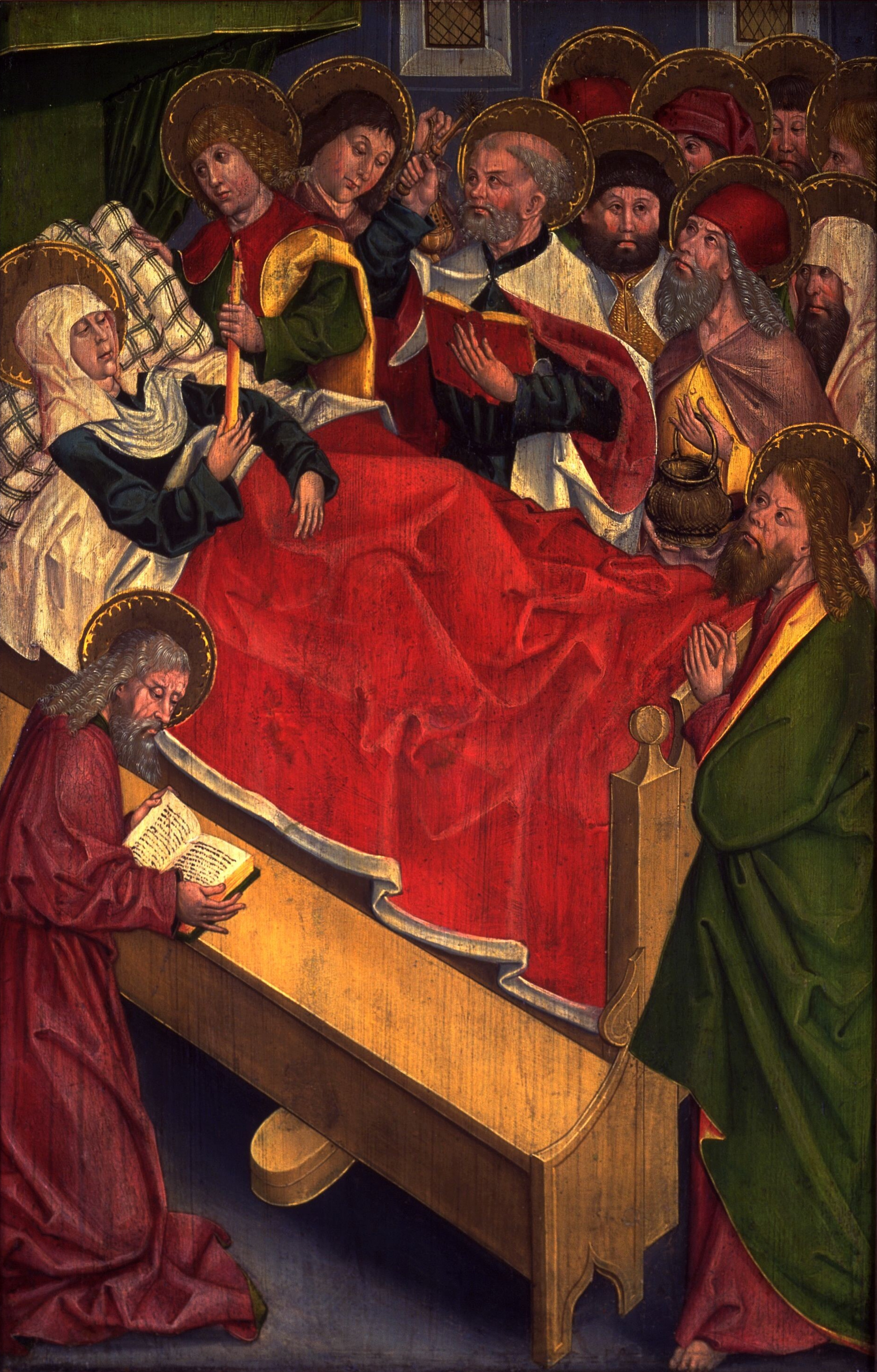
- Artist: Anonymous 15th century Tyrolean Master
- Year: late 15th century
- Medium: Oil on panel
- Dimensions: 91.8 cm × 61.3 cm (36.1 in × 24.1 in)
- Location: Fine Arts Museums of San Francisco, San Francisco

The Death of the Virgin acquired in 1944 by the Legion of Honor Art Museum in San Francisco is an oil painting on a panel created sometime in the late fifteenth century in Swabia, Germany by an unknown artist, portraying the Virgin Mary surrounded by the twelve apostles. The subject has been painted by several other anonymous masters of the Death of the Virgin.

== Art style ==
The painting contains many key religious figures, as religious works were the most popular during the Middle Ages. Religious paintings would often be done as works of patronage to a church, especially during the early Middle Ages. Towards the end of the fifteenth century, however, it was common for works of art to include more aspects of secular life and create a more human connection to the painting. The fact that Mary is elderly as she would be at that point in her life is historically accurate. All apostles are present at the scene of her death, but neither Jesus Christ nor any angels appear in the work.

== Symbols in the work ==
The artwork contains a few symbols in it. One of the symbols is the candle which the Virgin Mary can be seen holding. This is often a sign of the fact that Mary is still alive in the work. In other works the candle may be out, signifying she has passed. Around her bed are the twelve apostles, who appear to be in a kind of funerary ritual, as one can be seen reading from a book, another is sprinkling her with water, and another is holding incense. The bed also has a step, making it so that the viewer does not seem to out of complete reach of the Virgin Mary. Mary is also dying in a house or room, which has more in common with a fifteenth century home than a fifth century one.

== The Background of the story ==
The Death of the Virgin is inspired by a legend which originated in the fifth century, as it is nowhere to be found in any book from the Bible. The legend is also known as the Dormition of Theotokos (“the one who gave birth to God”), and originated mostly likely in the Byzantine world, working its way westward into Europe. In the legend, Mary is visited by an angel, sometimes Gabriel, informing her that she will die soon. She is granted a wish in which she asks to be united with all twelve apostles when she dies. As such, the apostles are miraculously transported from all over the world to the place where the Virgin Mary is dying. Those who are dead are also transported, some appearing on clouds. The artist of the work has chosen to represent this aspect of the story, as all the apostles appear. However, the author’s choice to be more realistic has led to the fact that no angels are present at the scene.

== See also ==
- Death of the Virgin (Caravaggio)
- Death of the Virgin (Mantegna)

== Sources ==
1. "The Death of the Virgin." Legion of Honor. Legion of Honor, n.d. Web. 23 Mar. 2014.
2. Nash, Steven A., Lynn F. Orr, and Marion C. Stewart. Masterworks of European Painting. New York: Hudson Hills, 1999. Print.
3. Walsh, Elizabeth. "Images of Hope: Representations of the Death of the Virgin, East and West." Religion and the Arts 11.1 (2007): 1-44. Web.
