= Adoration of the Magi (Mantegna) =

Painting by Andrea Mantegna

Uffizi Triptych
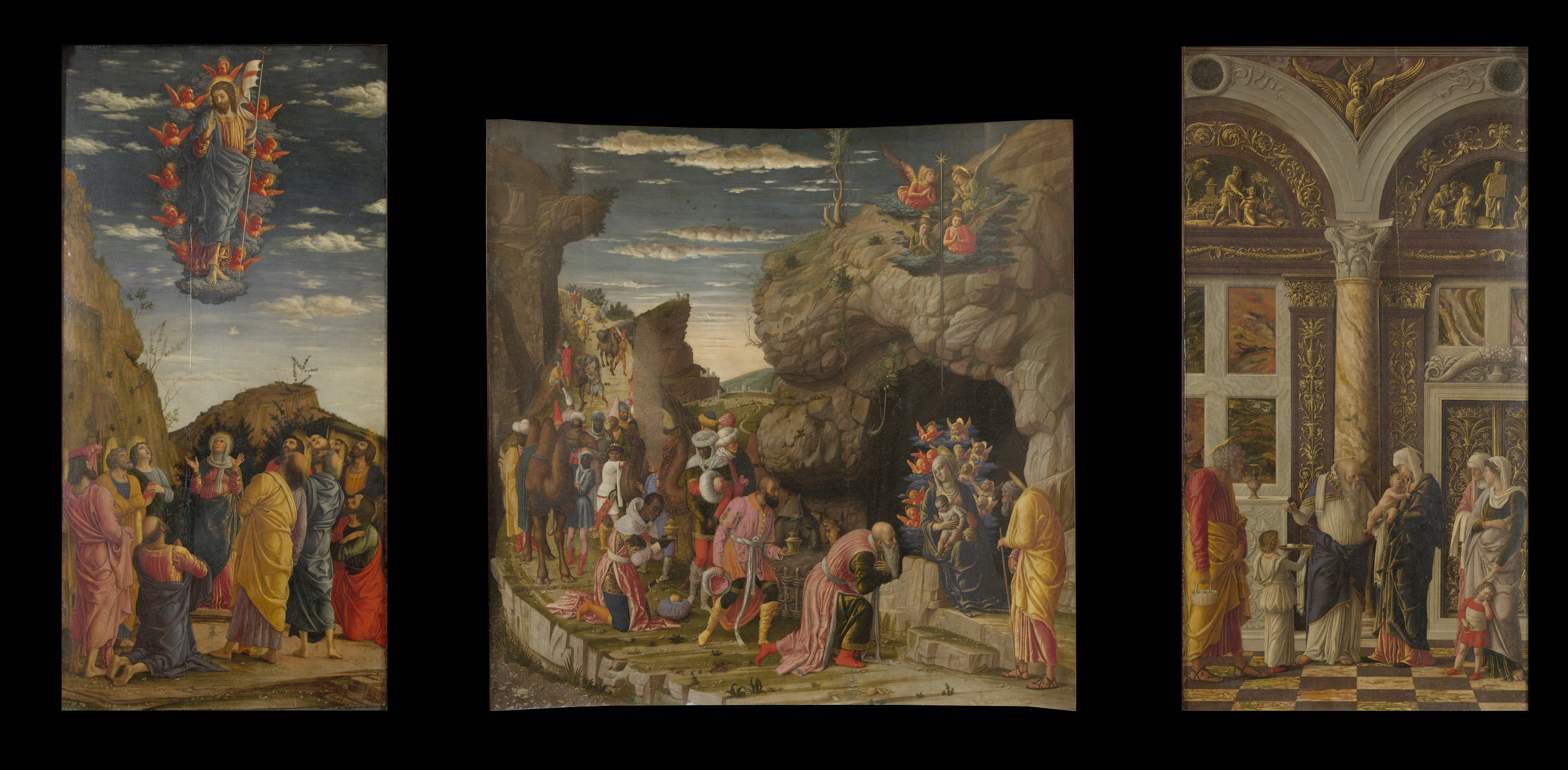
- Artist: Andrea Mantegna
- Year: 1462
- Medium: Tempera on panel
- Dimensions: 76 cm × 76.5 cm (30 in × 30.1 in)
- Location: Uffizi, Florence

The Adoration of the Magi or Uffizi Triptych is a group of three tempera paintings on panel by Andrea Mantegna, dating to around 1460. Their three subjects are the Ascension of Christ (86 by 42.5 cm), Adoration of the Magi the largest and central panel (76 by 76.5 cm) and the Circumcision of Christ (86 by 42.5 cm). They were gathered as a trio in the 19th century, although some art historians doubt that they were created as a triptych set as they are arranged. They are in the Uffizi Gallery in Florence.

== History ==
Most scholars agree the three works were commissioned in the 1460s for Ludovico III Gonzaga's private chapel in the Castle of St. George in Mantua (together with the Death of the Virgin, in the Museo del Prado, and Christ Bearing the Soul of the Virgin, in Ferrara). The paintings for the chapel are mentioned in two letters from Mantegna to Ludovico dated April 1464 and in Vasari as "a painting [by Mantegna], in which are scenes with small but very beautiful figures ... in the castle at Mantua, for the chapel".

Other scholars such as Fiocco argue that there is no evidence for how the three works got from Mantua to Florence and that they were instead produced in Tuscany during one of Mantegna's two trips there in 1466 and 1467. Stylistic reasons, however, link the work to Mantegna's final period in Padua, which ended in 1459, rather than to his maturity in Mantua.

The first secure reference to the three paintings dates to 1587, when it was found cut up in Valle Muggia near Pistoia among the belongings of Don Antonio de' Medici. They were inherited before in 1632 entering the collection of the Grand Duchy of Tuscany, where the Adoration was misattributed to Botticelli. The three works were exhibited together from 1827, with a gilded new neo-Renaissance intaglio frame which compensated for the differing sizes of the central work and the side panels.

Most modern critics note the differences between the three works, including their form, format, setting and quality, especially between the Circumcision and the other two works. Roberto Longhi doubted that the three works were conceived as a single unified triptych and theorised that instead they all came from different locations in the same chapel, as did Death of the Virgin and Christ Bearing the Soul of the Virgin. According to Longhi, Circumcision replaced Death of the Virgin when it was decided to limit the scheme solely to scenes from Christ's life.

== Adoration ==
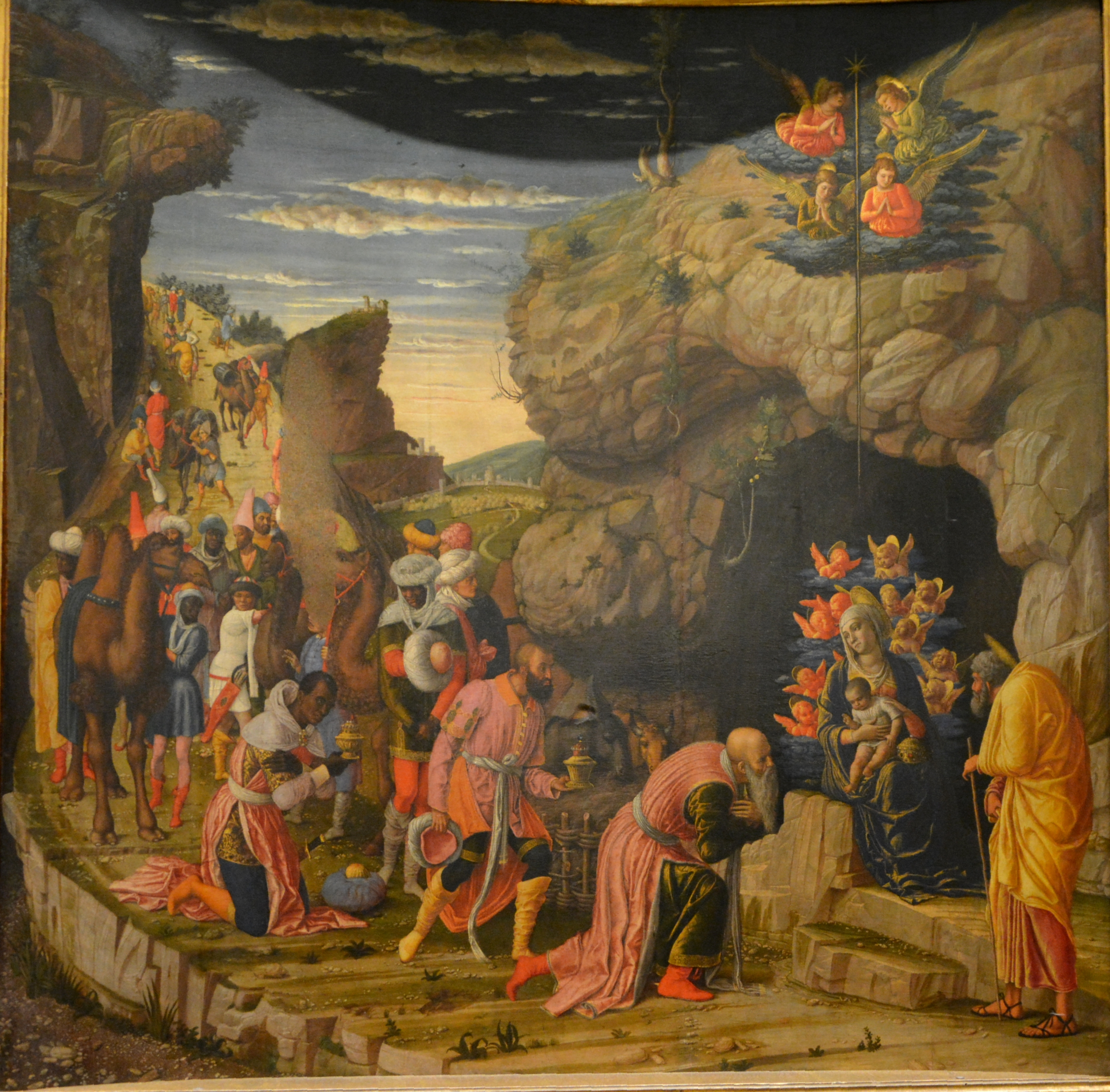
The Adoration

The panel was probably located in the chapel's apse. The Magi are depicted while descending to the Child's grotto from a path carved out in the rock. The Virgin is portrayed with a crown of angels, according to a Byzantine model.

Another version of the painting sold for the then record price of $10.5 million in 1985.
