= Death of the Virgin (Christus) =

Painting by Petrus Christus

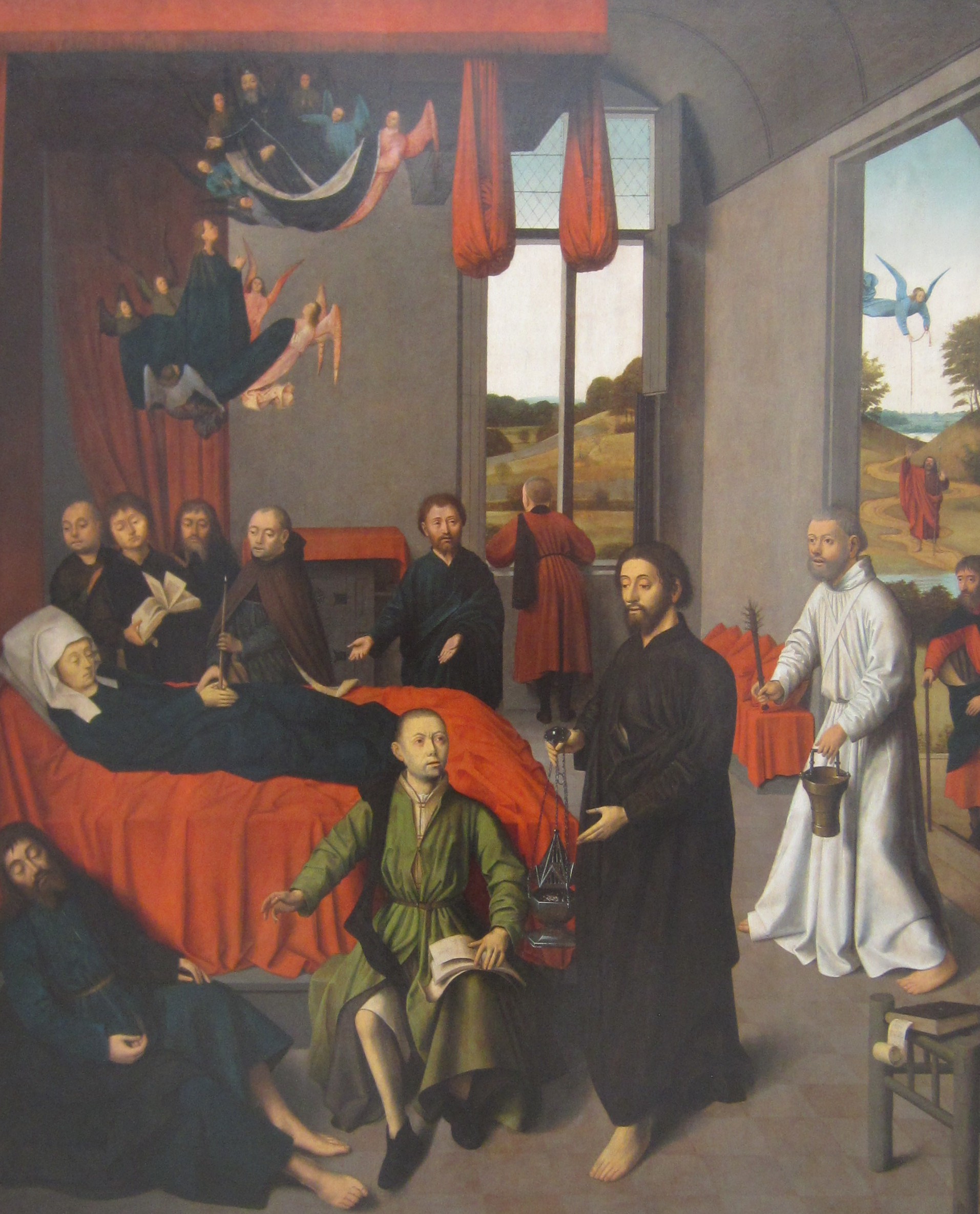
- Artist: Petrus Christus

Death of the Virgin is a 1460–65 painting by Petrus Christus. It is part of the collection of the Timken Museum of Art in San Diego, California, United States. The work is the largest by the artist. It was previously on loan to the National Gallery of Art in Washington, D.C.

In 1994, Michael Kimmelman of The New York Times said the work "may be in poor condition, but it doesn't take an expert eye to tell that this is a clunky, awkward painting. It's curious that someone capable of such subtlety when painting portraits should produce such peculiar-looking figures here and elsewhere when painting from his imagination".

== See also ==
- Death of the Virgin
- Death of the Virgin (van der Goes)
