= Master of the Death of the Virgin =

Three anonymous artists have been called Master of the Death of the Virgin, after works depicting the Death of the Virgin Mary:

- Master of the Death of the Virgin (engraver), a German engraver active in the middle of the fifteenth century
- Master of the Death of the Virgin (painter), a Netherlandish painter of the sixteenth century
- Master of the Amsterdam Death of the Virgin, another Netherlandish painter

== See also ==
- Master of the Life of the Virgin
