= Master of the Life of the Virgin =

Late Gothic German painter

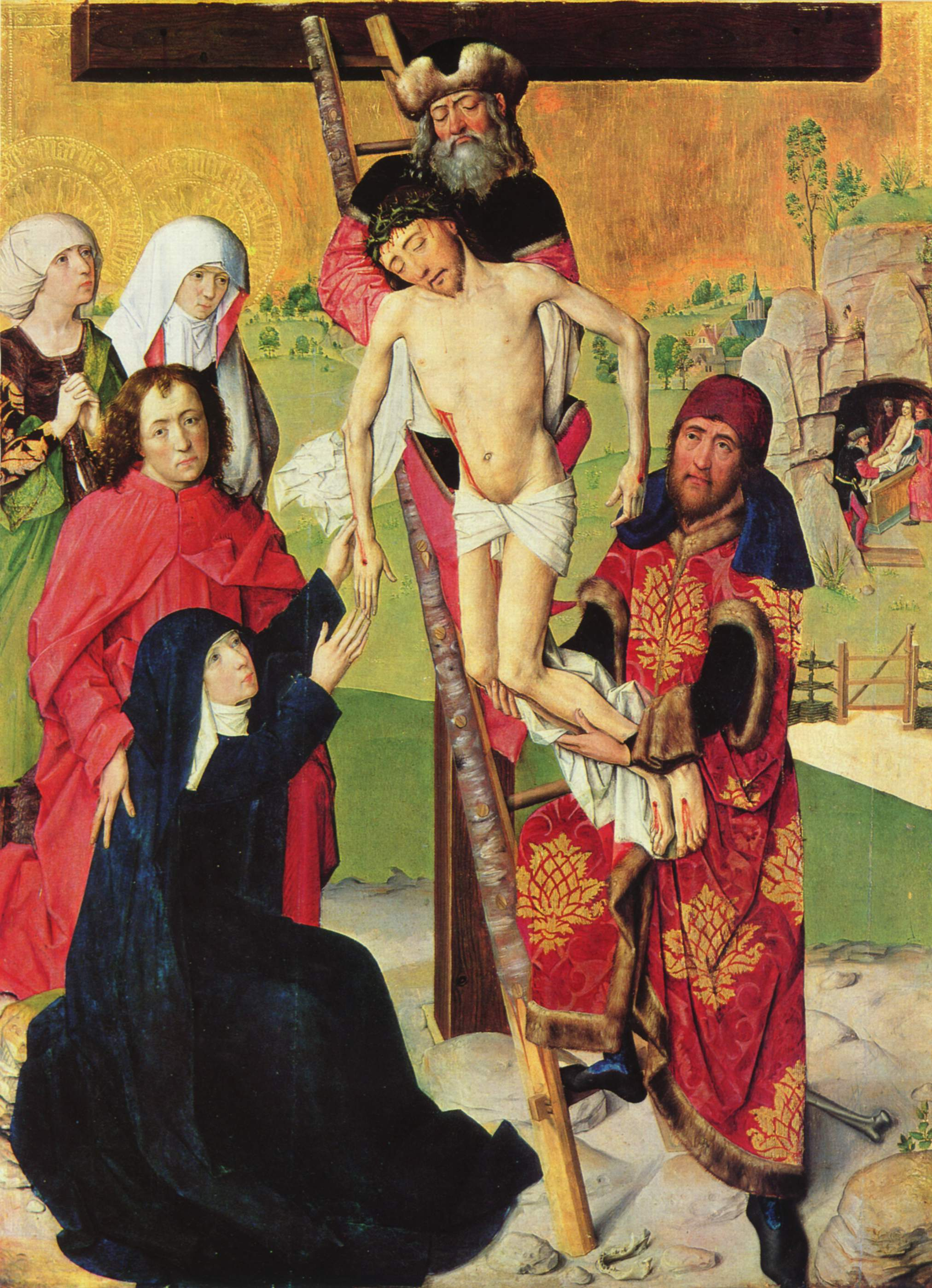
Deposition of Christ at the Wallraf-Richartz Museum, Cologne

The Master of the Life of the Virgin, in German the Meister des Marienlebens, (working ca. 1463 — ca. 1490), is the pseudonym given to a Northern renaissance German painter working in Cologne. He can also be known as the Master of Wilten, or Johann van Duyren, an identification not universally accepted.

His workshop is identified by his masterwork, a series of eight depictions of conventional scenes from the Life of the Virgin Mary, painted for the Ursulakirche, Cologne; seven are in the Alte Pinakothek, Munich, and one in the National Gallery, London, who also have the four outer panels from an altarpiece from Werden, whose central panel appears to be lost. Further works recognizable by their style and handling are the Crucifixion of Christ for the hospital chapel, Bernkastel-Kues; the Adoration of the Magi in the Germanisches Nationalmuseum, Nuremberg; and the Crucifixion and Deposition of Christ at the Wallraf-Richartz Museum, Cologne.

Through the detectable influence of Netherlandish painters including Dirk Bouts and Rogier van der Weyden, it is generally suggested that he must have received some training in the Low Countries.

Though his name is unknown, through his paintings he has become the most celebrated Late Gothic painter of the Cologne School. His elegant figural style is well enough known that his considerable influence can be detected in the work of other painters in Cologne.

He is not to be confused with another 13th-century Norwegian "Master of the Life of the Virgin", the late 15th-century Venetian "Master of the Louvre Life of the Virgin," or the three artists each known as the Master of the Death of the Virgin.

== Gallery ==
Seven of the eight scenes from the eponymous Life of the Virgin, in Munich with one exception. The final Assumption is missing.

Meeting at the Golden Gate

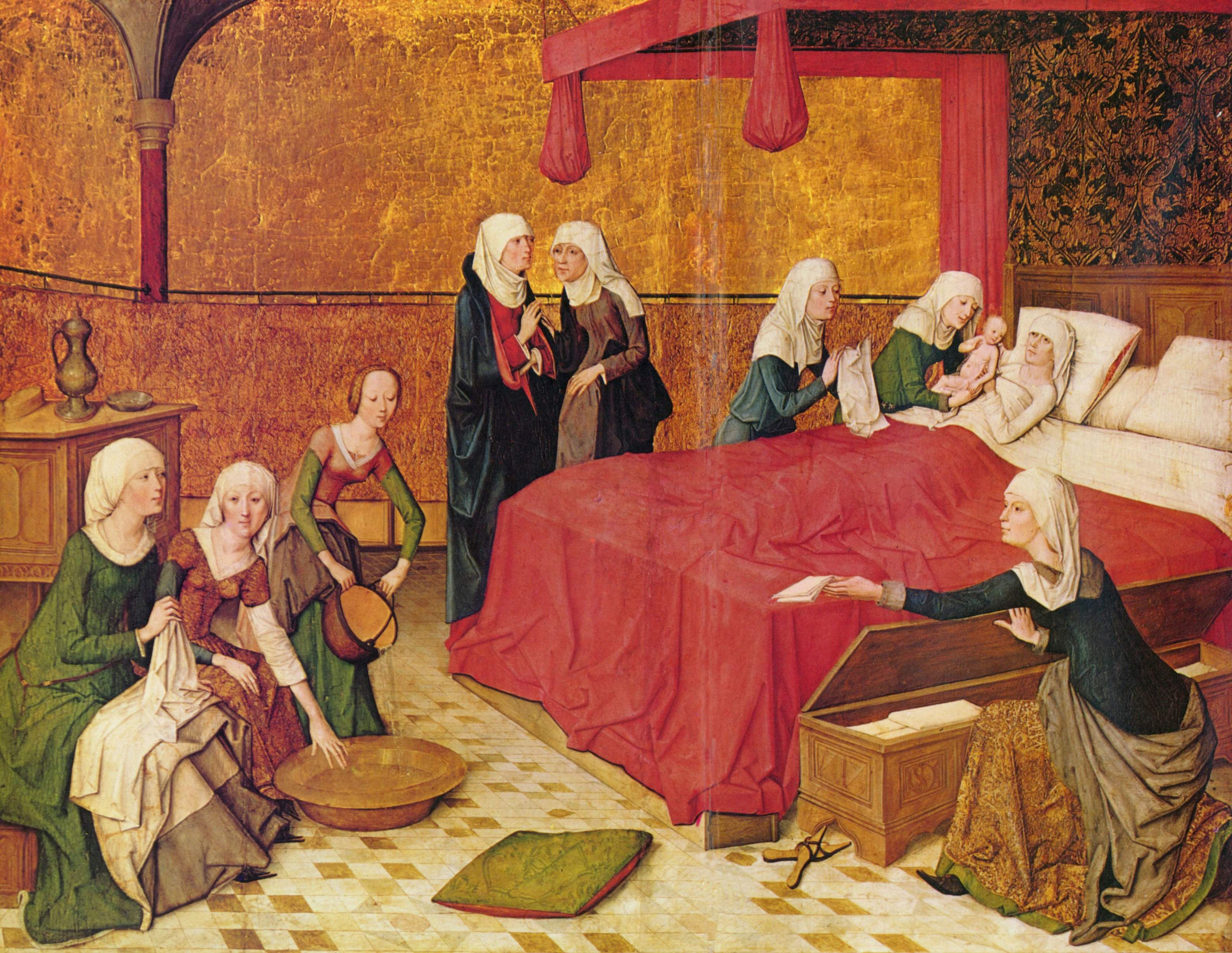
Nativity of Mary

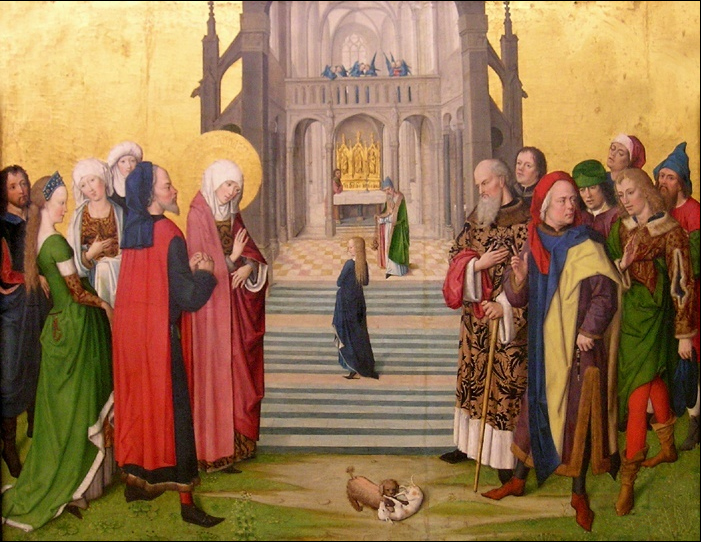
Presentation of Mary

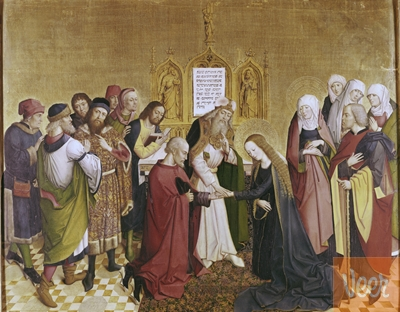
Marriage of the Virgin

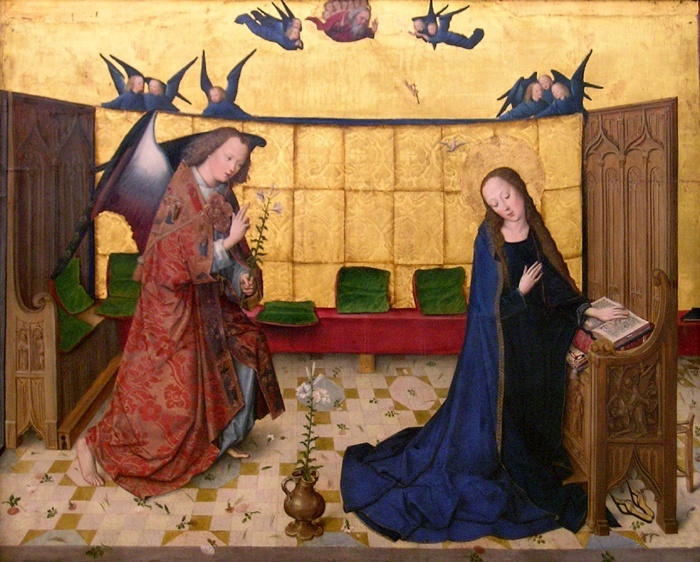
Annunciation

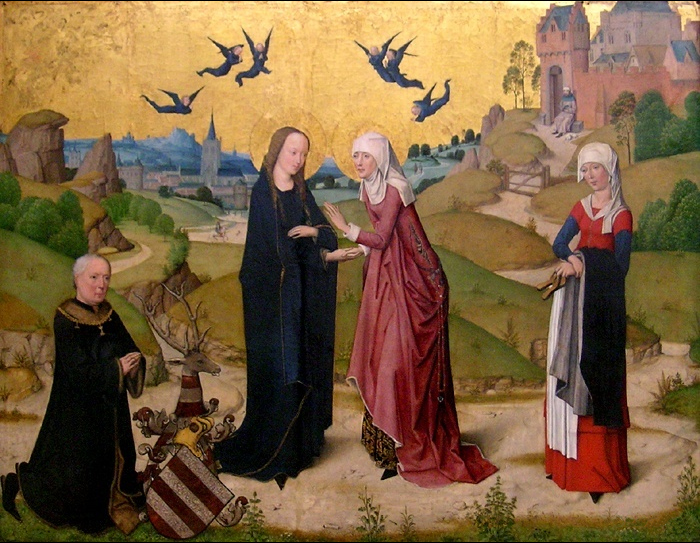
Visitation

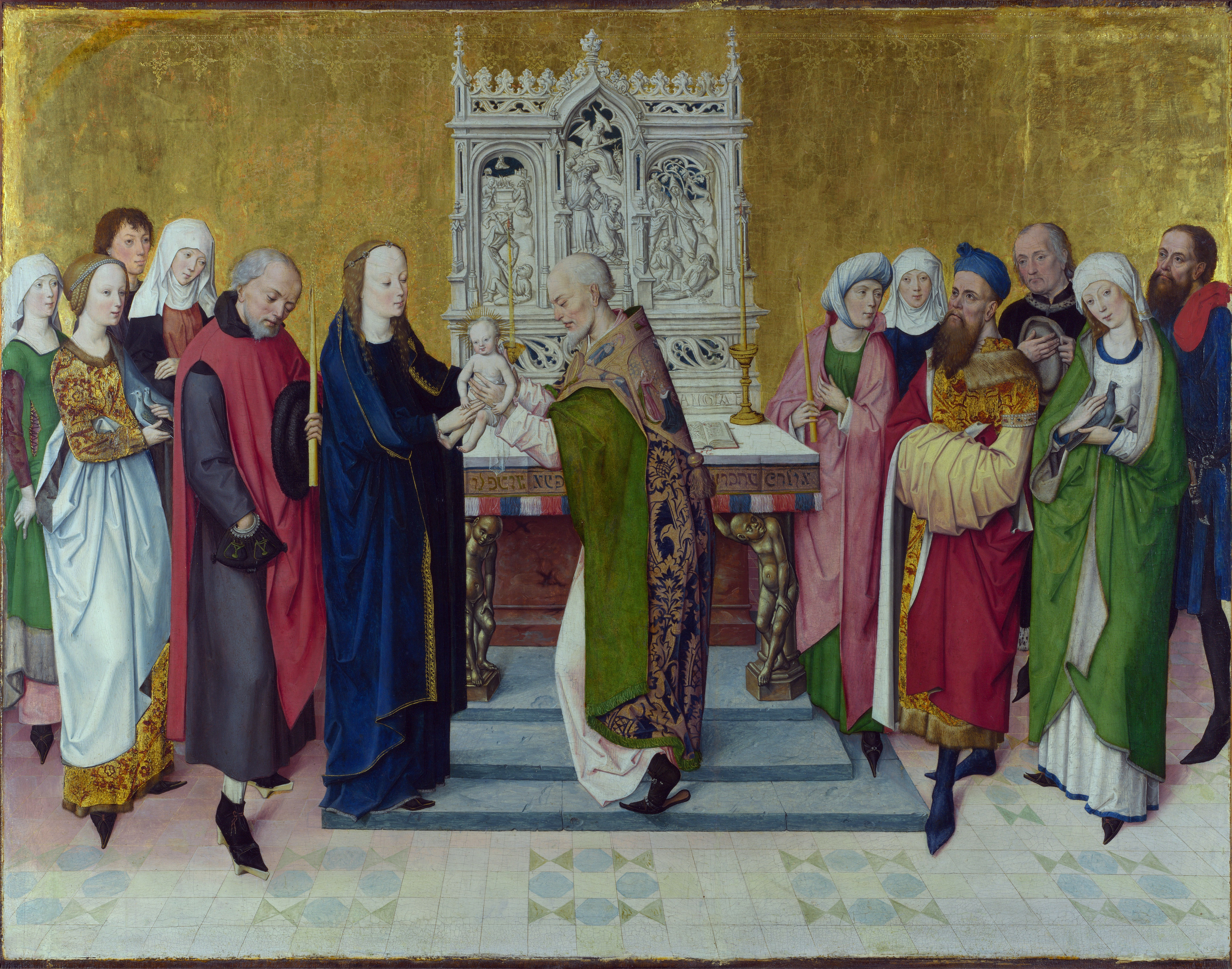
Presentation of Jesus at the Temple, London

== E ==
- Kunsthalle, Karlsruhe: Portrait of a Scholar, attributed to the Meister des Marienlebens
- Infobitte: Meister des Marienlebens
