= Giulio Mancini =

Italian physician, art collector, art dealer and writer

- Born: 21 February 1559; Siena
- Died: 22 August 1630 (aged 71); Rome
- Occupations: physician, art critic

Giulio Mancini (21 February 1559 – 22 August 1630) was a seicento physician, art collector, art dealer and writer on a range of subjects. His writings on contemporary artists like Caravaggio and Annibale Carracci remain one of our earliest sources of biographical information; his Considerazioni being an important source on art in early 17th-century Rome.

== Biography ==
Mancini was born in Siena and attended the University of Padua, where he studied medicine, astrology and philosophy. He went to Rome in 1592, where he practised medicine; from 1595 at the Hospital of Santo Spirito. He became personal physician to Pope Urban VIII in 1623. The pope was a notable patron of the arts, and their relationship was such that, in 1628, Mancini was made an apostolic protonotary and a canon of St. Peter's.

Mancini's writings went unpublished until the 20th century; his Considerazioni sulla pittura (thoughts on painting), written between 1617 and 1621, remained so until 1956. His advice to the collector gives us insight into the contemporary art market in Rome; his notes on spotting fakes were the first indication of how sophisticated these pastiches had already become by the early 17th century.

In the Considerazioni, he distinguishes four tracts of painting in his contemporary Rome: that of Caravaggio; that of Carracci; the third of Giuseppe Cesari; and the fourth of everybody else, the mannerist painter Cristoforo Roncalli, for instance. There is evidence that he knew, at least Caravaggio, well, having attended to the artist when he was ill and staying at the Palazzo Madama, probably in 1595. Mancini was also well acquainted with Caravaggio's benefactor, Francesco Maria del Monte.

As dealer he most notably sold Caravaggio's The Death of the Virgin to Vincenzo Gonzaga, Duke of Mantua for 280 scudi in 1607; a transaction proposed to the Duke by Peter Paul Rubens and brokered by Giovanni Magno.

In his private life, Mancini was known as a self-confessed atheist, someone who moved in libertine circles, an art lover and a connoisseur. He was a member of the Accademia degli Umoristi, a literary club founded in 1603, whose members included Giovanni Battista Guarini, Alessandro Tassoni, and Gian Vittorio Rossi. He also wrote on such diverse subjects as dancing and the ways of courtiers.

Upon his death, Mancini left his fortune to be distributed among the students of Siena.
