= Master of the Amsterdam Death of the Virgin =

Unidentified 15th-century Dutch painter

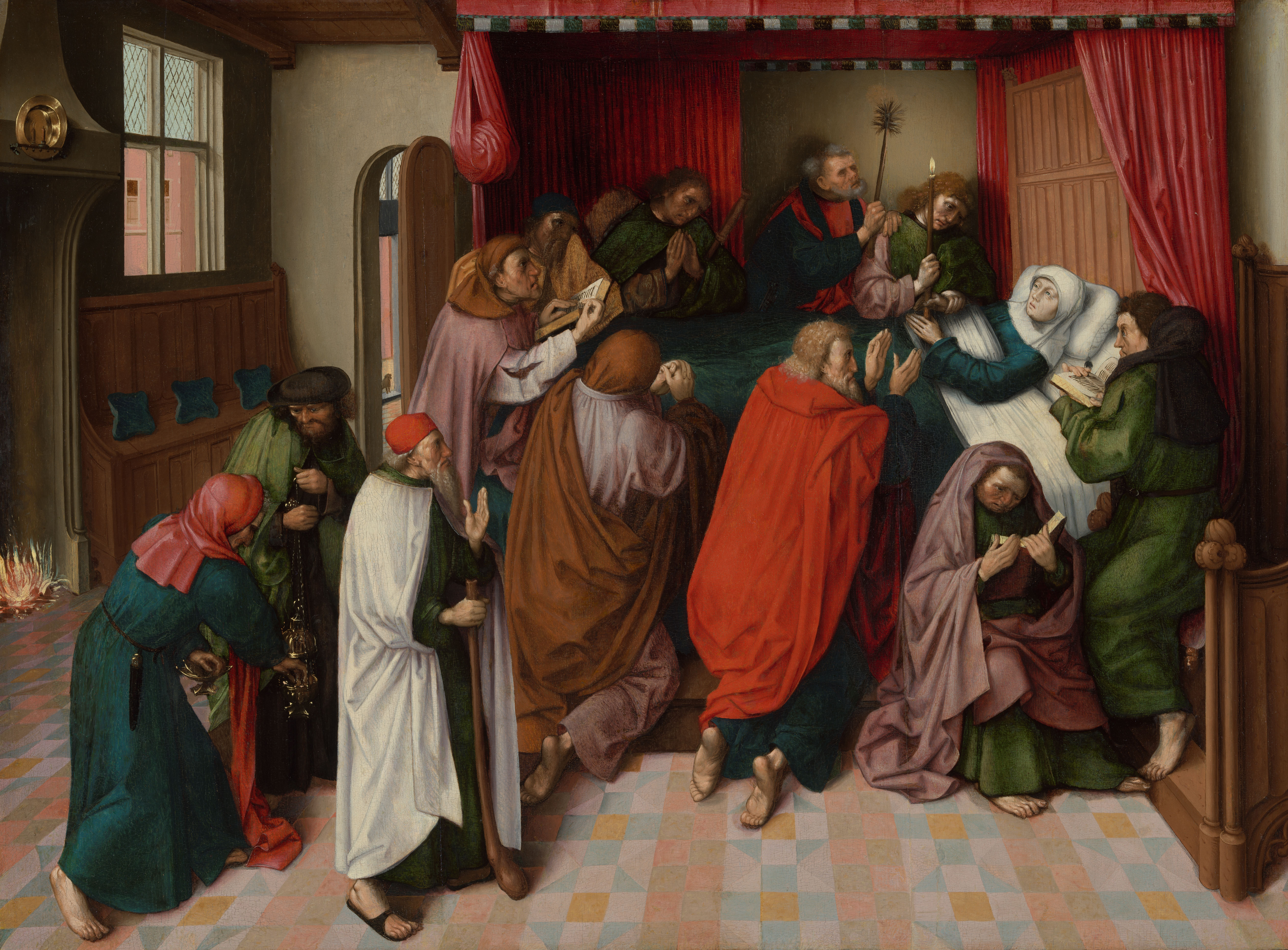
The Death of the Virgin (c. 1500). 57.5 x 76.8 cm, Rijksmuseum Amsterdam

The Master of the Amsterdam Death of the Virgin (sometimes called the Master of the Almshouse of the Seven Electors) (fl. c. 1500) was a Netherlandish painter. His notname is derived from a panel depiction of the Death of the Virgin, dated to about 1500 and now in the Rijksmuseum Amsterdam. The painting shows the Virgin Mary and the twelve Apostles in a complex interior, in intimate mood. The figures in the painting are small, with small heads and hands; their torsos, however, are bulky and covered in drapery. The name "Master of the Almshouse of the Seven Electors" is sometimes preferred because it refers to the name of the institution that donated the painting to the museum. There is also some disagreement over the attribution of paintings ascribed to the Master; some critics prefer instead to attribute some of them to the poorly known Master of the Lantern. Critics also disagree as to his origin; some have linked him to Amsterdam, while others have suggested ties to Utrecht and its school of manuscript painters.
