= Death of the Virgin (Caravaggio) =

Painting by Caravaggio

- Morte della vergine (Italian), Transito della Madonna (Italian)
- Artist: Caravaggio
- Year: c. 1604-1606, 1602
- Medium: Oil on canvas
- Dimensions: 369 cm × 245 cm (145 in × 96 in)
- Location: Louvre, Paris

Death of the Virgin is an oil on canvas painting by the Italian Baroque master Caravaggio, from c. 1604-1606. It is a depiction of the death of the Virgin Mary. It is part of the collection of the Musée du Louvre, in Paris.

== History ==
When he painted The Death of the Virgin (c. 1601–06), Caravaggio had been working in Rome for fifteen years. The painting was commissioned by Laerzio Cherubini, a papal lawyer, for his chapel in the Carmelite church of Santa Maria della Scala in Trastevere, Rome; the painting could not have been finished before 1605–06. The depiction of the Death of the Virgin caused a contemporary stir, and was rejected as unfit by the parish.

Giulio Mancini thought Caravaggio modelled a prostitute, possibly his mistress, as the Virgin. (Note: "One can see how much wrong the moderns do: if they decide to depict the Virgin, Our Lady, they portray her like some filthy whore from the slums.", 59v, 152r-v, 160v) Giovanni Baglione (Note: "For the Madonna della Scala in Trastevere, Caravaggio painted the Death of the Madonna. But because he so disrespectfully (con poco decoro) made the Madonna swollen-up and with bare legs, it was removed, and bought by the Duke of Mantua to be placed in his splendid gallery.") and Gian Pietro Bellori (Note: "The same fate (of being refused) met the Death of the Virgin in the church of the Scala, removed because the Virgin had been made to look too much like the swollen corpse of an ordinary dead woman.") attributed the rejection to the appearance of the Virgin. The breach of decorum led to a rejection of the painting by the fathers of Santa Maria della Scala and its replacement by a picture by Carlo Saraceni, a close follower of Caravaggio.

Upon the recommendation by Peter Paul Rubens, who praised it as one of Caravaggio's best works, the painting was bought by Vincenzo Gonzaga, Duke of Mantua. Giovanni Magni, the duke's ambassador, briefly exhibited the painting in his house on the Via del Corso, between 1 and 7 April 1607. Copying was absolutely forbidden.

The duke's collection was sold to Charles I of England in 1627. After his execution the English Commonwealth put his collection up for sale in 1649, and the painting was bought by Everhard Jabach, who in 1671 sold it to Louis XIV for the French Royal Collection, which after the French Revolution became the property of the state. Today it hangs in the Louvre. Prior to leaving Rome, it was shown at the Academy of Painters for under two weeks. However, Caravaggio had fled Rome by then, never to publicly return. (During one of his frequent brawls in Rome, the mercurial and impulsive Caravaggio had killed a man, Ranuccio Tomassoni, in a sword fight following a tennis game.)

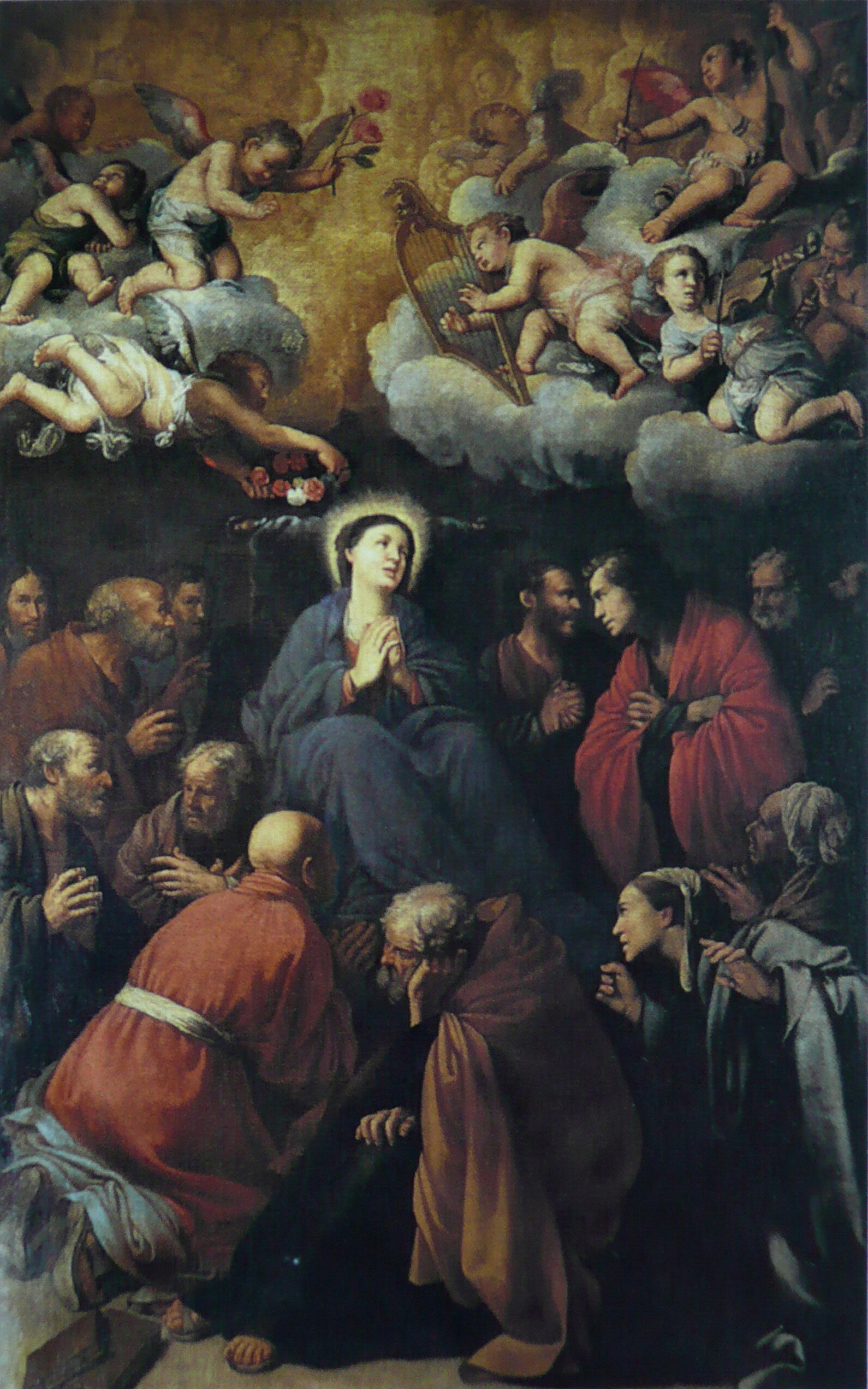
Carlo Saraceni, Death of the Virgin, 459 × 273 cm, Santa Maria della Scala, Rome

== Description ==
External videos
- Smarthistory - Caravaggio's Death of the Virgin

The painting recalls Caravaggio's Entombment in the Vatican in scope, sobriety, and the photographic naturalism. The figures are nearly life-sized. Mary lies reclined, clad in a simple red dress. The lolling head, the hanging arm, the swollen, spread feet depict a raw and realistic view of the Virgin's mortal remains. Caravaggio completely abandons the iconography traditionally used to indicate the holiness of the Virgin. In this cast-off body, nothing of the respectful representation found in devotional paintings remains.

=== Composition ===
The composition is arranged around the Virgin, the painting's central theme. Surrounding the Virgin are the overcome Mary Magdalene and the apostles. Others shuffle in behind them. The compact mass of the assemblage and the posturing of the figures guide the viewer's eye toward the abandoned body. Caravaggio expresses the greater grief of the former not by a more emotive face, but by hiding their faces. Caravaggio, master of stark and dark canvases, is not interested in a mannerist exercise that captures a range of emotions. In some ways this is a silent grief, this is no wake for wailers. The sobbing occurs in faceless emotional silence. The holiness of the Virgin is discerned by her thread-like halo. Suppressing all anecdotal detail, Caravaggio invests this subdued scene with extraordinary monumentality through the sole presence of these figures and the intensity of their emotions. The theatrical drape of blood-red cloth looms in the upper portion of the canvas; a common motif in deposition painting, here used to heighten the scene's dramatic effect.

=== Use of light and shadow ===
The painter makes use of the nuances of light and shadow to model the volumes of the objects, figures, and clothing. But above all he accentuates, through this process, the physical presence of the Virgin, struck by a dazzling light. The artist creates the illusion of depth through a series of lighter areas: from the back of Mary Magdalene's neck in the foreground, the eye penetrates further into the painting, passing from Mary's face to the hands and heads of the apostles.

== Treatment of the subject ==
This painting was completed at a time when the dogma of the Assumption of Mary was not yet formally enunciated ex cathedra by the pope, but had been gaining ground for some centuries. Pope Pius XII, in his Apostolic constitution, Munificentissimus Deus (1950), which dogmatically defined the Assumption, left open the question of whether or not Mary actually underwent death in connection with her departure, but alludes to the fact of her death at least five times. The New Testament does not mention the matter at all. How she passed from this world is and was therefore not a matter of Catholic dogma, although by the 17th century, the conventional belief among Catholics was that she was assumed alive, as shown in the great majority of contemporary paintings of the subject. By then most believed that she felt no pain or disease, and that she was assumed in healthy if aged body and soul prior to "death". However, during a General Audience on 25 June 1997, Pope John Paul II affirmed that Mary did indeed experience natural death prior to her assumption into Heaven.

Caravaggio's painting is the last major Catholic work of art in which Mary is clearly dead. Caravaggio does not depict an assumption but her death. The figure, like that in nearly all Renaissance and Baroque Assumptions, looks much younger than a woman some 50 or more years old; (Note: By the conventional chronology, Mary was about 48 at Pentecost, her last appearance in scripture. She was generally thought to have lived on for some years after this, though there was no generally accepted tradition for how long.) medieval depictions of the death were often more realistic in this respect.

== Influence ==
This painting illustrates the iconographic and formal revolution that Caravaggio instigated in the late 16th and early 17th centuries. Distancing himself from the precious, affected mannerist vogue, the artist inaugurated a frank, robust, energetic style. He took on the task of translating people's reality and emotions without worrying about the conventions of representations of the sacred. His impact on the evolution of pictorial conceptions in the 17th century was considerable.

== See also ==
Other Madonnas by Caravaggio:

- Madonna of Loreto
- Madonna and Child with St. Anne (Dei Palafrenieri)
- Madonna of the Rosary

Other images of the Death of the Virgin:

- Death of the Virgin (Anonymous)
- Death of the Virgin (Mantegna)
- Death of the Virgin (Saraceni)

== Other images ==
- List of paintings by Caravaggio
