= Death of the Virgin =

Subject in art

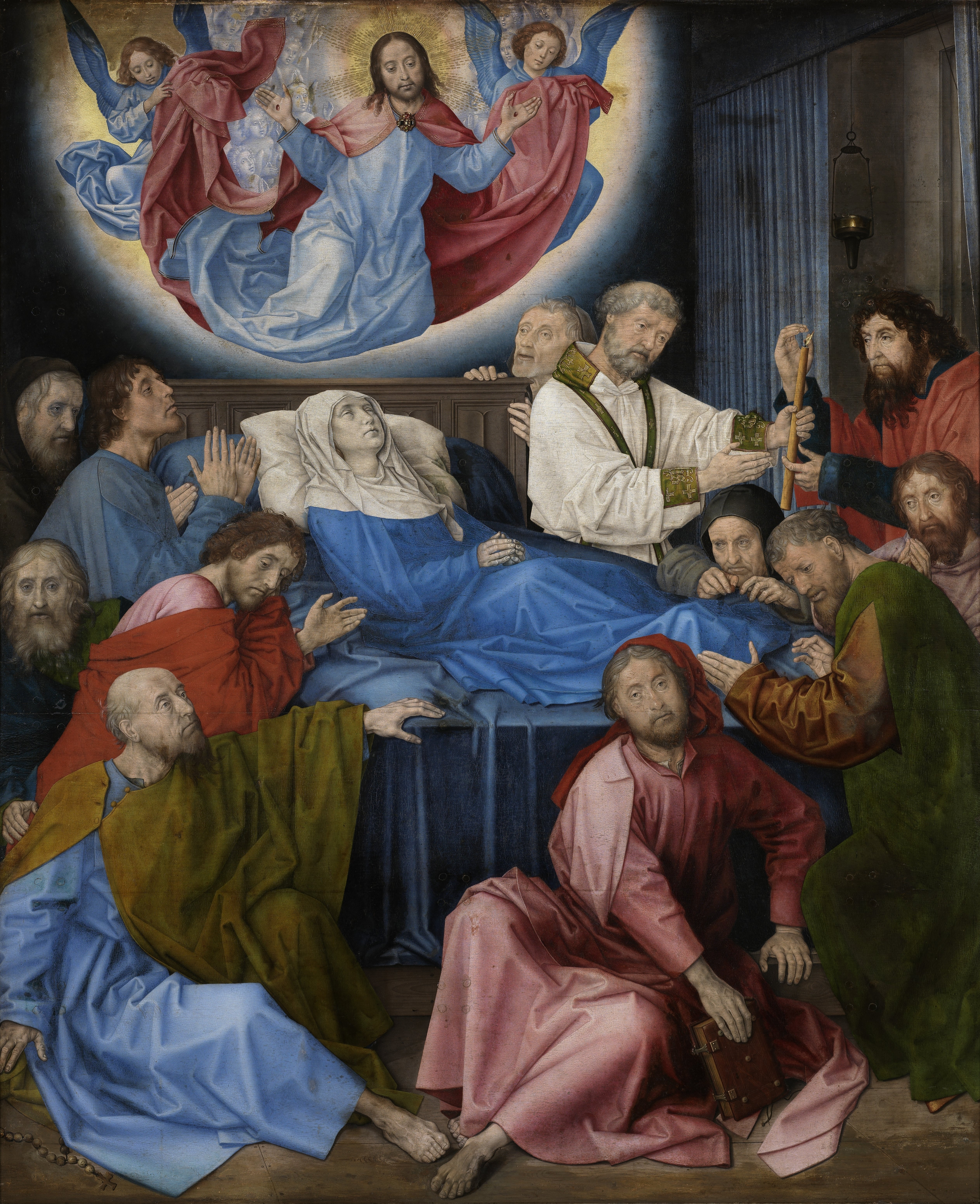
Death of the Virgin, Hugo van der Goes, c. 1480

The Death of the Virgin Mary is a common subject in Western Christian art, and is the equivalent of the Dormition of the Theotokos in Eastern Orthodox art.

== History ==
The depiction became less common as the doctrine of the Assumption gained support in the Catholic Church from the Late Middle Ages onward. Although that doctrine avoids stating whether Mary was alive or dead when she was bodily taken up to Heaven, she is normally shown in art as alive. Nothing is said in the Bible about the end of Mary's life, but a tradition dating back to at least the 5th century says the Twelve Apostles were miraculously assembled from their far-flung missionary activity to be present at the death, and that is the scene normally depicted, with the apostles gathered round the bed.

== Examples ==
A virtuoso engraving by Martin Schongauer of about 1470 shows the Virgin from the foot of a large bed with the apostles spread around the three sides, and this composition influences many later depictions. Earlier depictions usually follow the standard Byzantine image, with the Virgin lying on a bed or sarcophagus across the front of the picture space, with Christ usually standing above her on the far side, and the apostles and others gathered around. Often Christ holds a small figure that may look like a baby, representing Mary's soul.

A prominent, and late, example of the subject is Death of the Virgin by Caravaggio (1606), the last major Catholic depiction. Other examples include Death of the Virgin by Andrea Mantegna and Death of the Virgin by Hugo van der Goes. All these show the gathering of the apostles around the deathbed, as does an etching by Rembrandt.

Three minor anonymous works are known to art history as the Master of the Death of the Virgin.

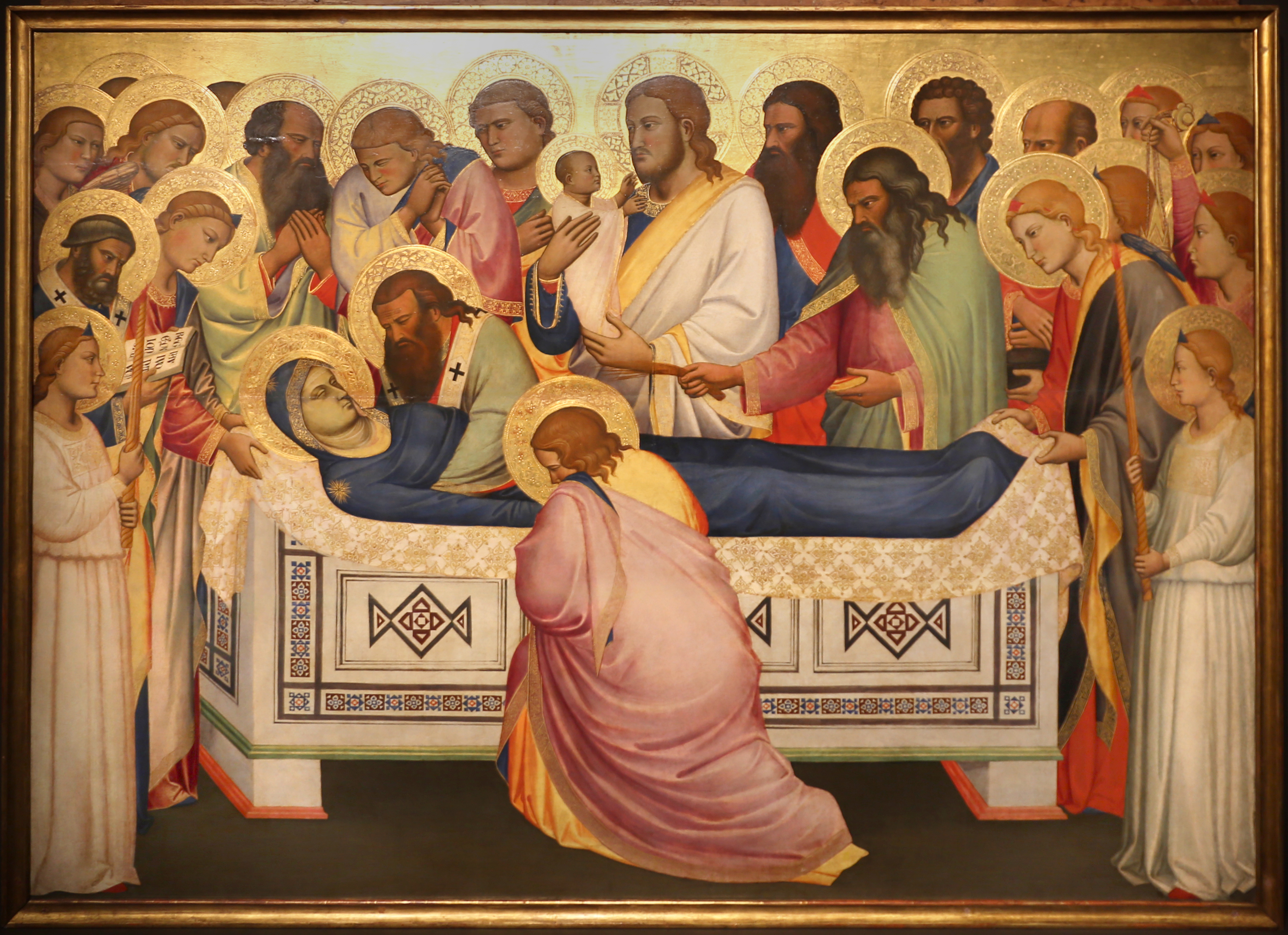
Niccolò di Pietro Gerini, Death and Assumption of the Virgin, c. 1370–1375

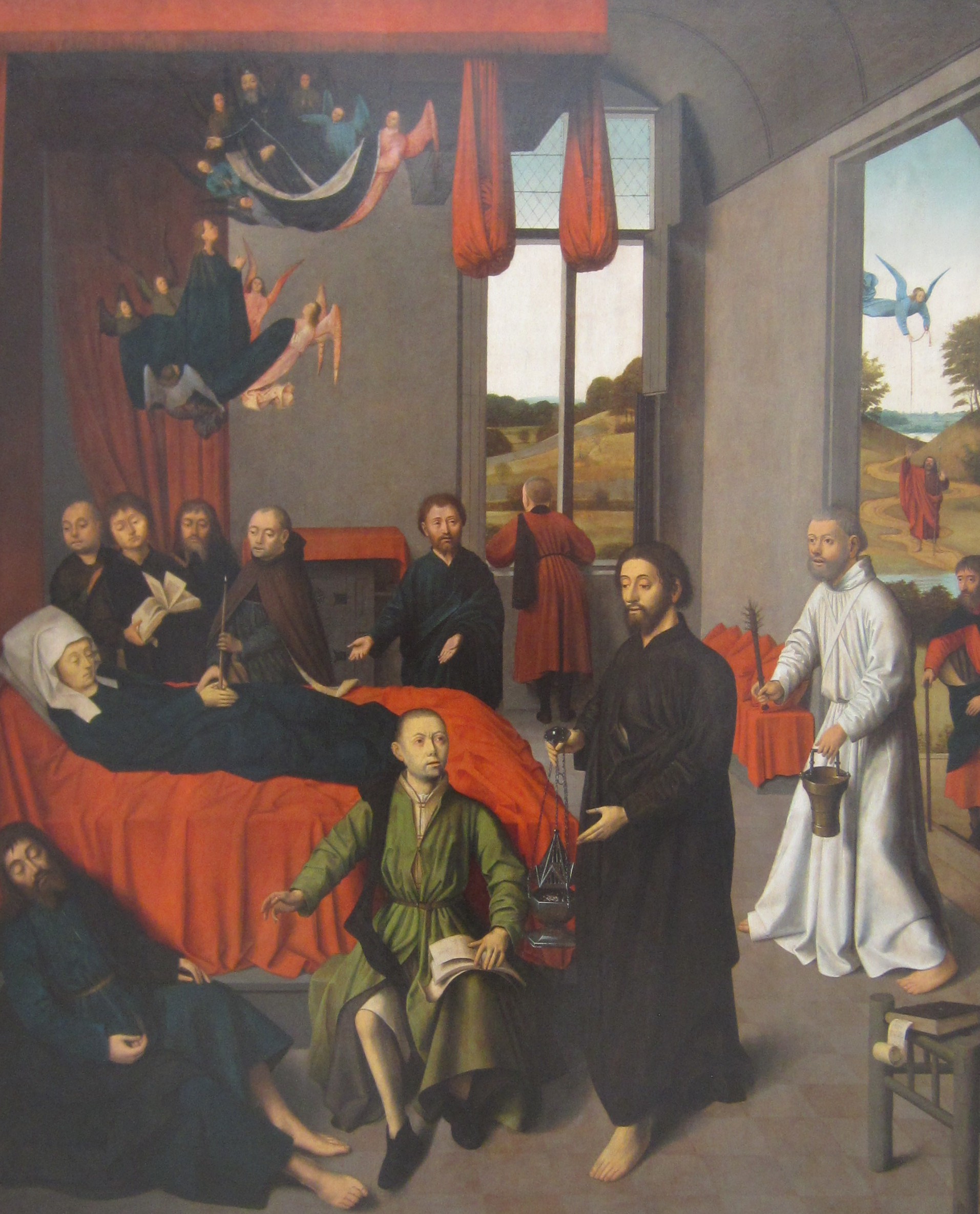
Death of the Virgin, Petrus Cristus, c. 1460–65

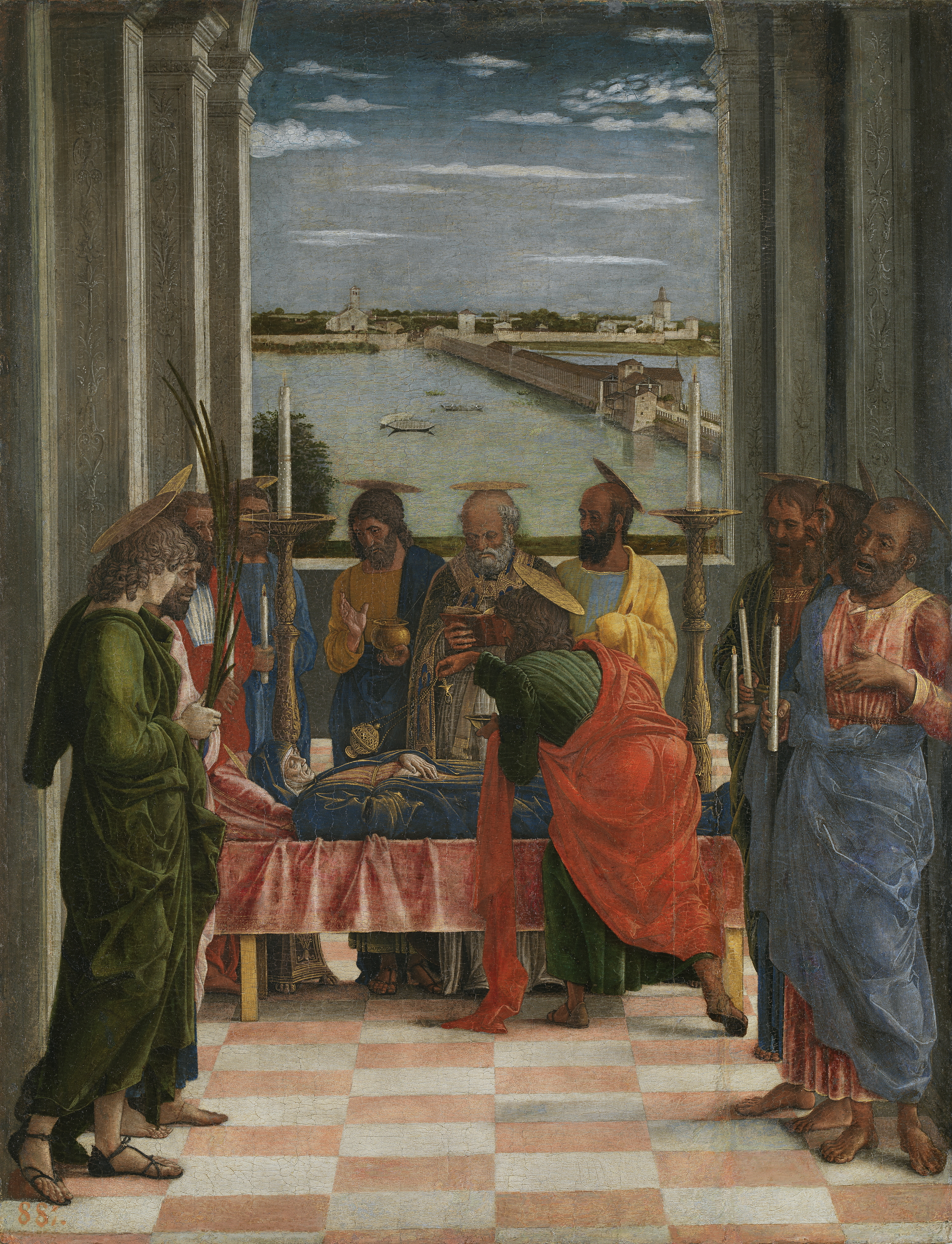
Death of the Virgin by Andrea Mantegna, c. 1461

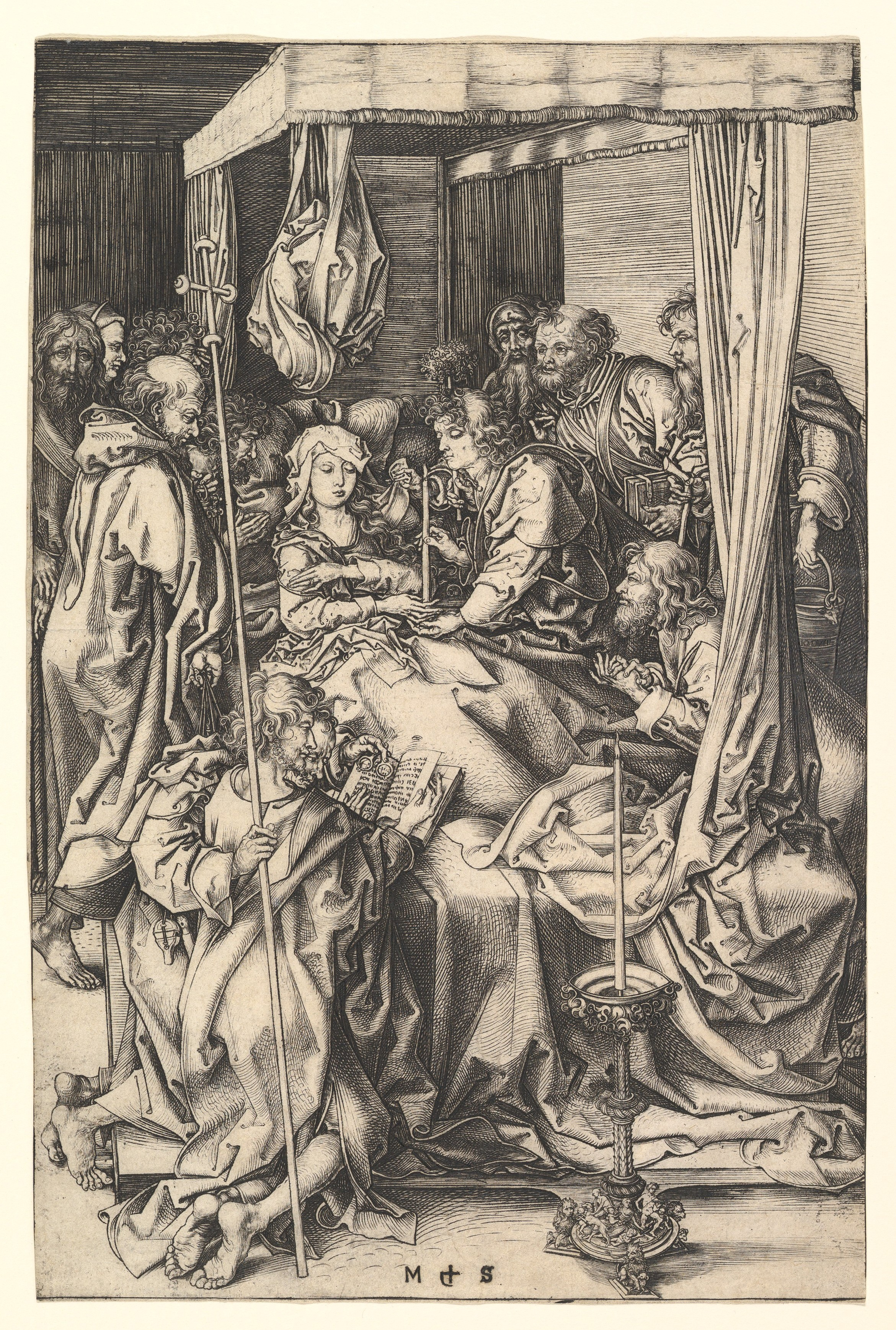
Engraving by Martin Schongauer, c. 1470

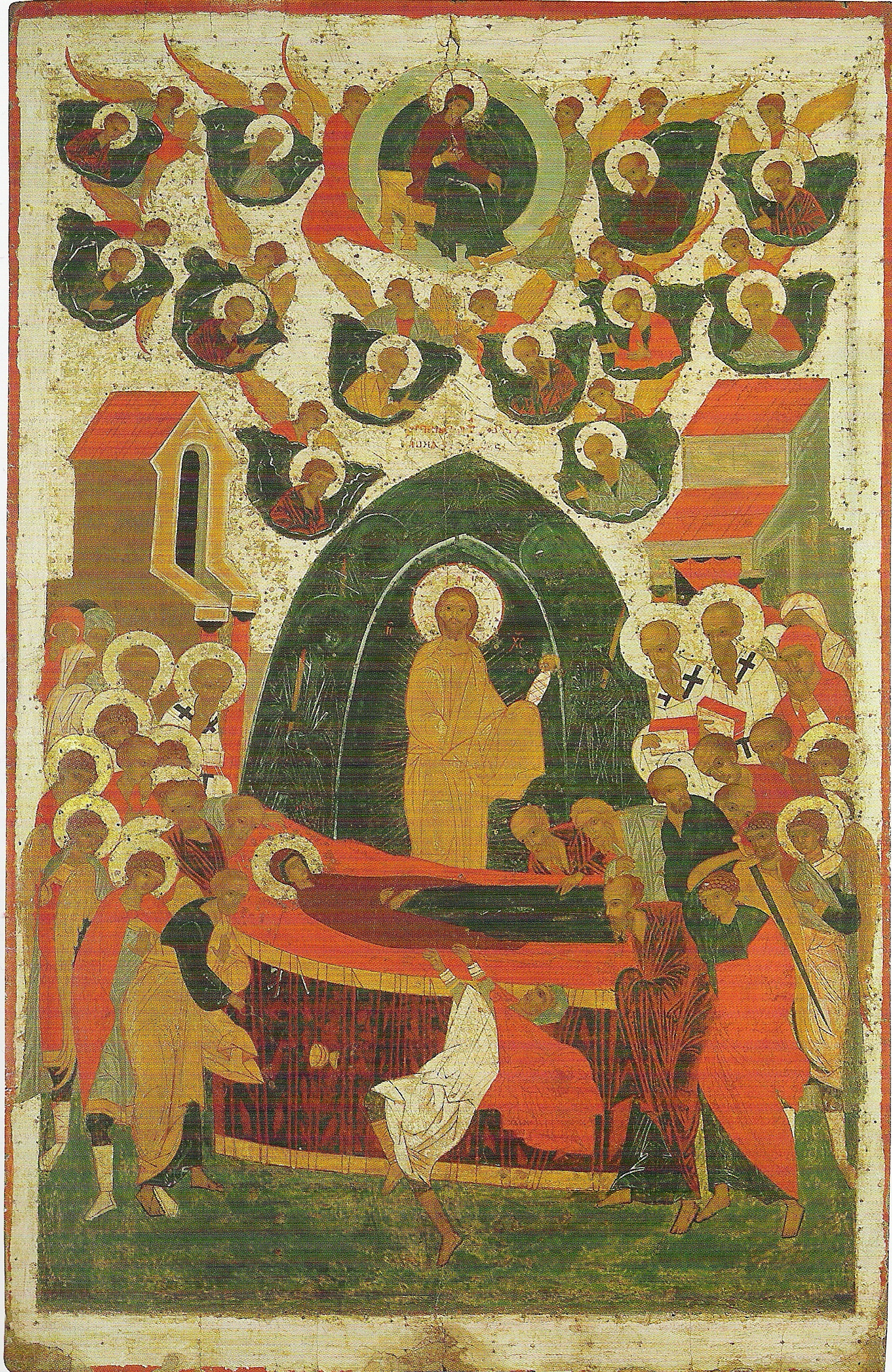
Russian icon, early 16th century

Death of the Virgin, Caravaggio, 1606
