= Christ Bearing the Soul of the Virgin =

1462 painting by Andrea Mantegna

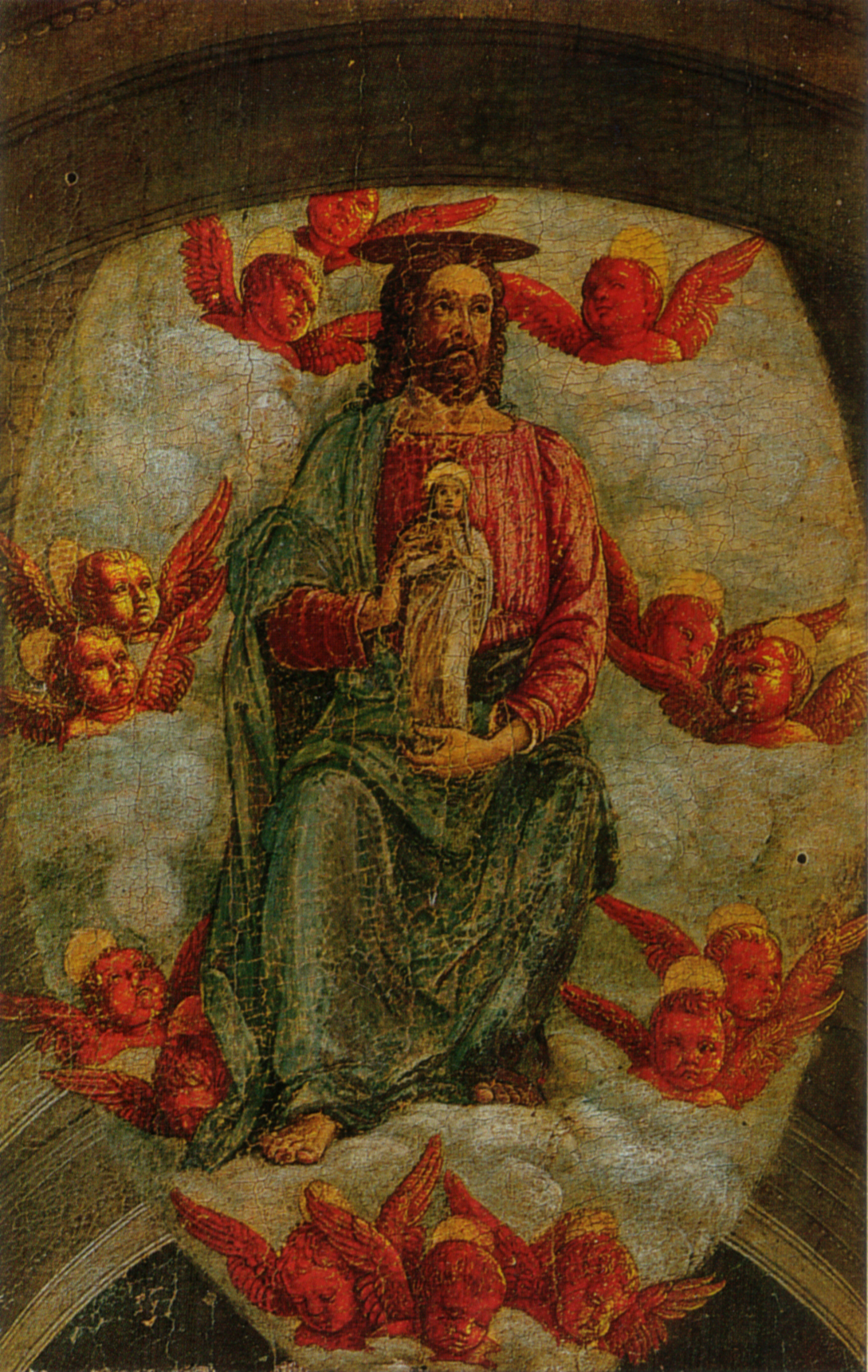
- Artist: Andrea Mantegna
- Year: 1462
- Medium: oil on panel
- Dimensions: 27,5 cm × 17,5 cm (108 in × 69 in)
- Location: Pinacoteca Nazionale, Ferrara

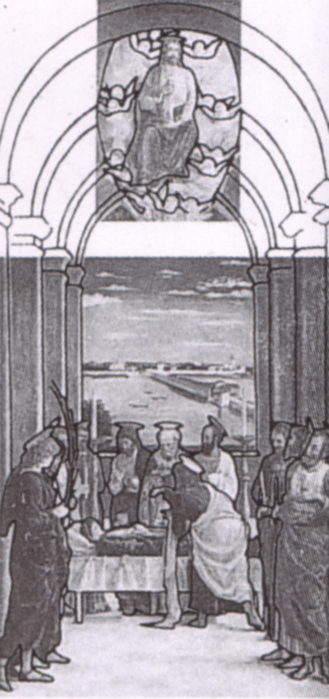
Reconstruction of the whole painting

Christ Bearing the Soul of the Virgin is a tempera on panel painting measuring 27.5 by 17.5 cm by the Italian Renaissance painter Andrea Mantegna. It was completed around 1462 and is now in the Pinacoteca Nazionale in Ferrara. It shows Christ in an almond-shaped cloud bearing the soul of the Virgin Mary straight to heaven after her death, accompanied by cherubs. The soul is represented by a statuette, rather than the more usual symbol of a child.

== History ==
Roberto Longhi was the first to identify it as a fragment of the upper register of Death of the Virgin (Prado), probably for the private chapel of Ludovico III Gonzaga in the Castello di San Giorgio in Mantua. At its base is the arch which links it to the main painting. The design and decorative scheme for Ludovico's chapel was Mantegna's first official commission – he became court painter in 1460, but negotiations to bring him to court had begun three years earlier. During the 16th century the chapel was rebuilt and redecorated, with the 15th-century paintings and decorations removed, though the 16th-century scheme itself was later destroyed. Death of the Virgin ended up in Ferrara, as shown by its appearance in a 1588 inventory listing it as among the paintings in the small private chapel of Margherita Gonzaga, wife of Alfonso II d'Este. The part of the work showing Christ and the Virgin's soul may have been removed at this time to fit the work into its smaller new home.
