= Death of the Virgin (Mantegna) =

Painting by Andrea Mantegna

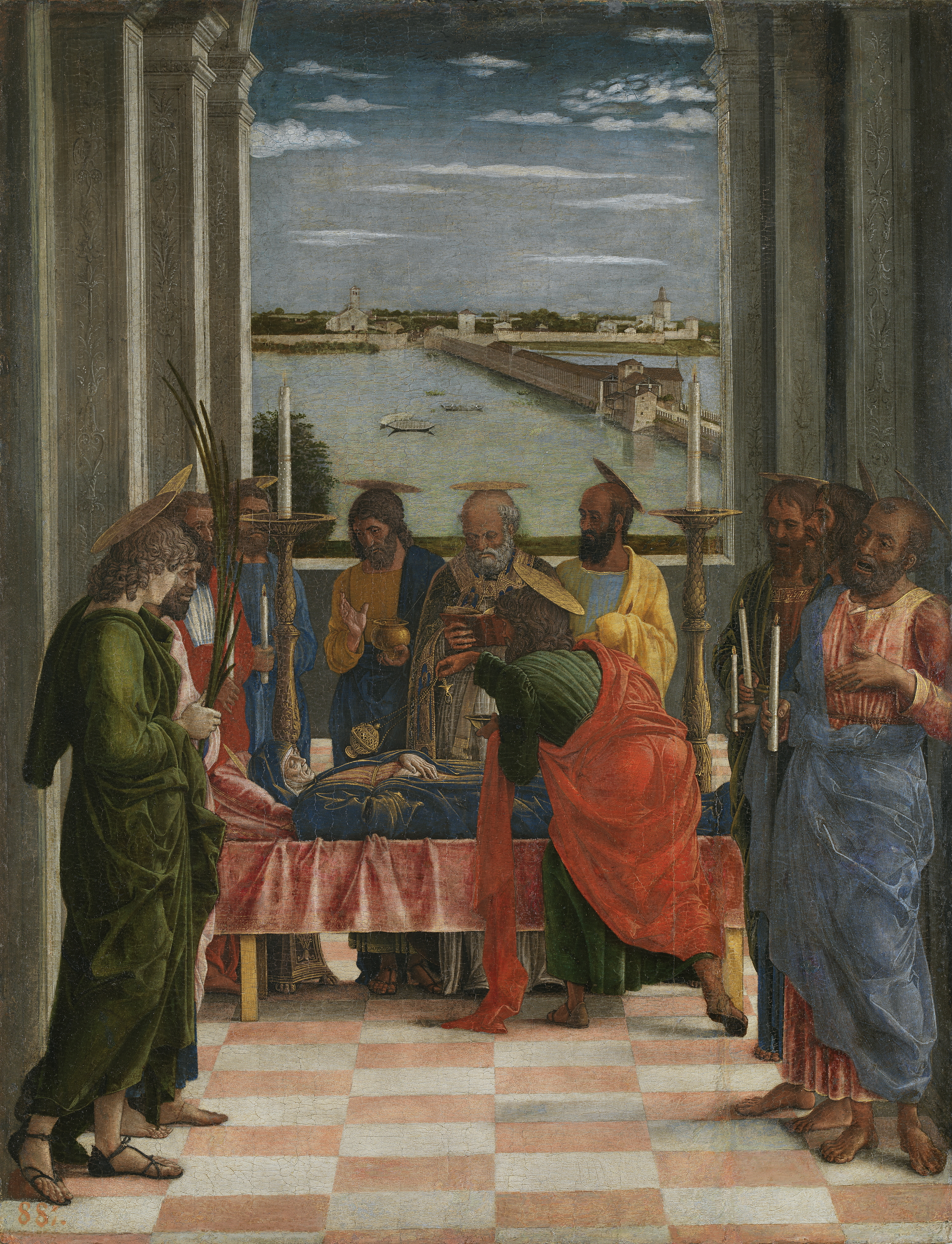
- Artist: Andrea Mantegna
- Year: 1462–1464
- Type: Tempera and gold on panel
- Dimensions: 54 cm × 42 cm (21 in × 17 in)
- Location: Museo del Prado, Madrid

The Death of the Virgin is a painting by the Italian Renaissance painter Andrea Mantegna, dating to c. 1462–1464.

In this picture Mantegna depicts the last moment of the Virgin Mary's life within a space defined by classical architecture, with a squared pavement which leads the observer's eyes towards the bed on which the Virgin lies. In the background is a lake scene which is a detailed reproduction of the bridge and the burgh of the Castello di San Giorgio in Mantua. The work was originally part of the decoration of the castle's chapel, together with three panels now in the Uffizi in Florence (The Adoration of the Magi, The Ascension and The Circumcision, collectively known as the Uffizi Triptych) and one now in the Pinacoteca Nazionale, Ferrara (Christ Bearing the Soul of the Virgin).

The unfinished appearance of the pilasters in the upper part of the picture suggests that it was once larger than it appears today. The fragment showing Christ with the Virgin's soul, now in Ferrara, was most likely part of the original composition.

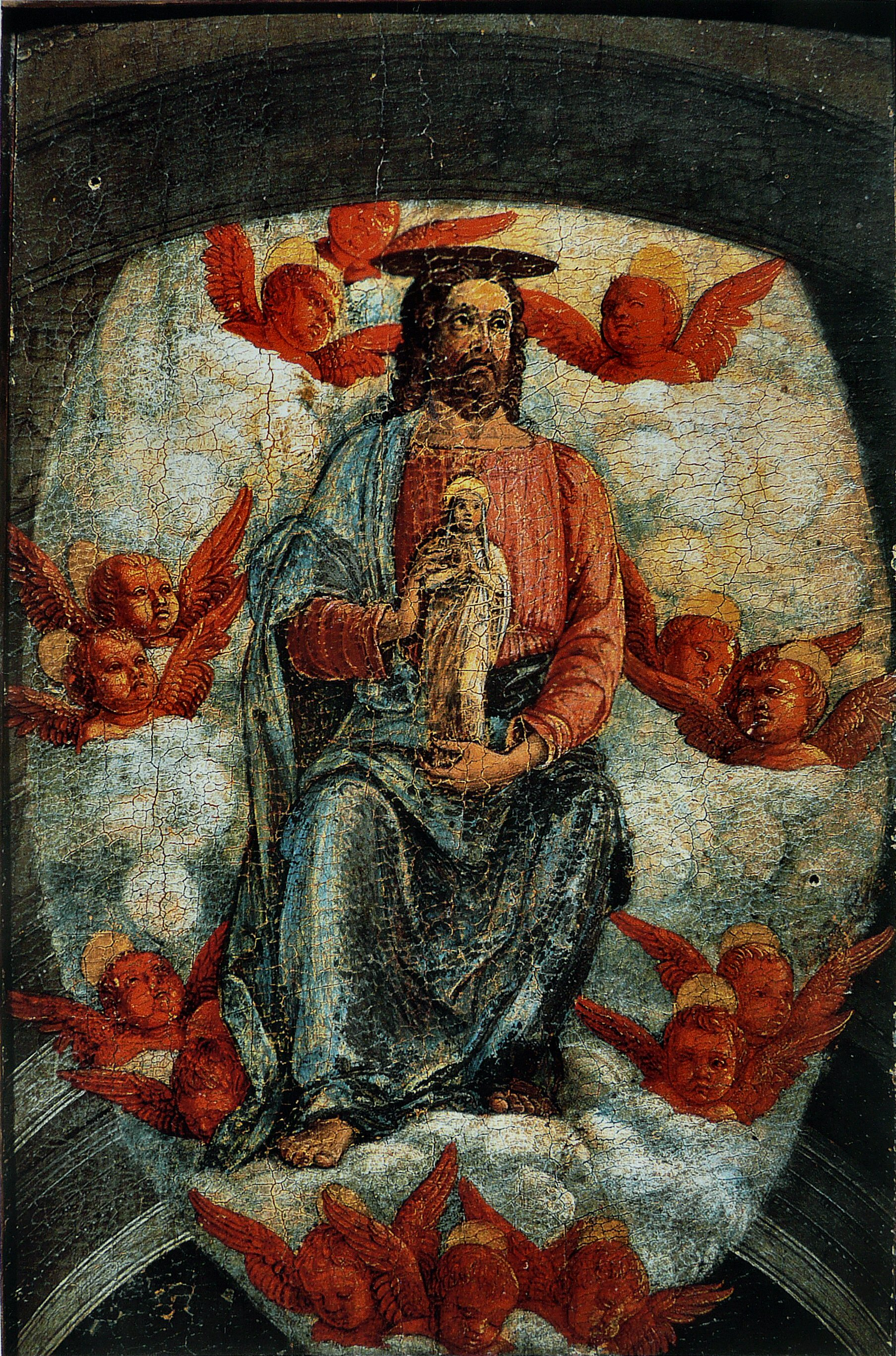
Andrea Mantegna, Christ Bearing the Soul of the Virgin, Pinacoteca Nazionale, Ferrara

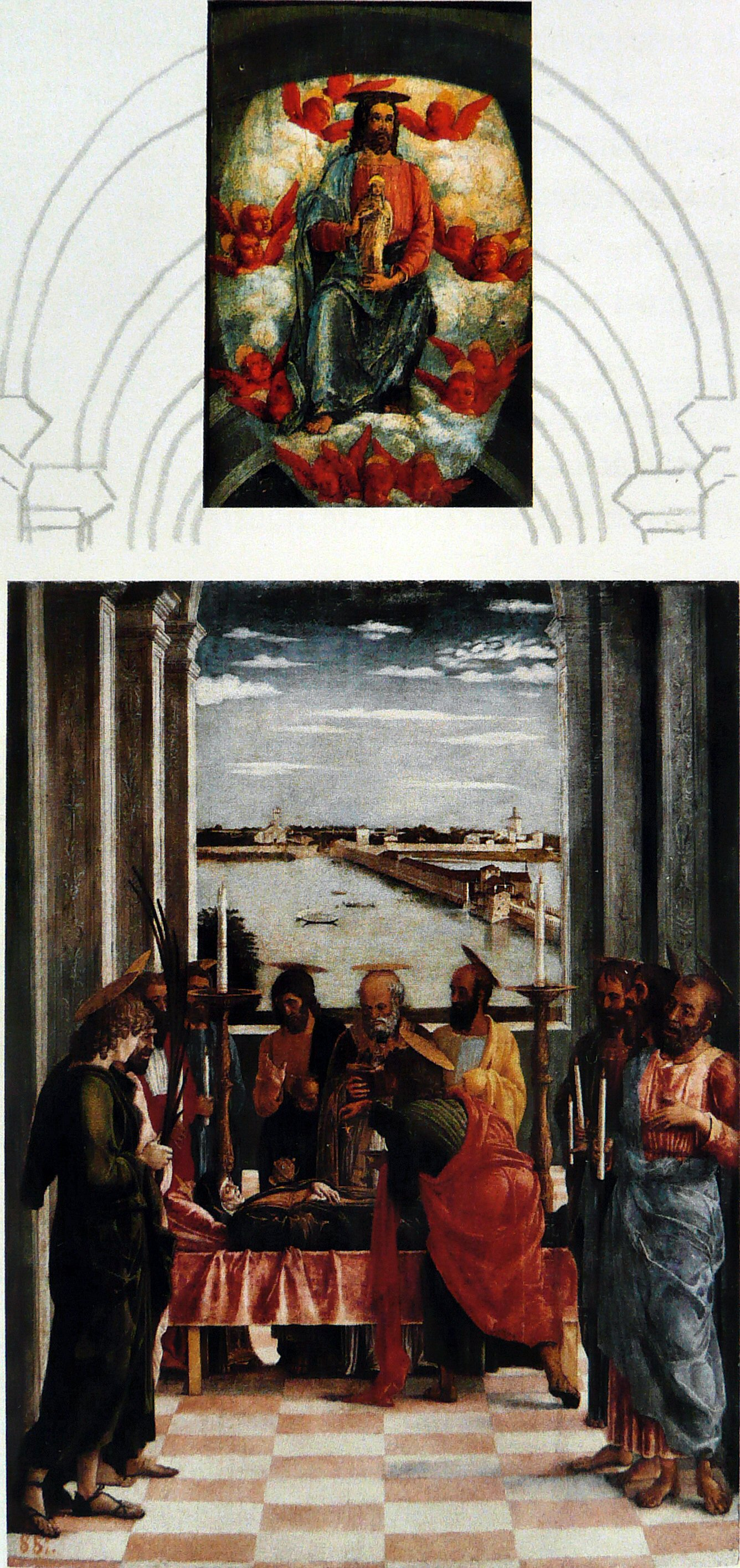
Reconstruction of the original composition

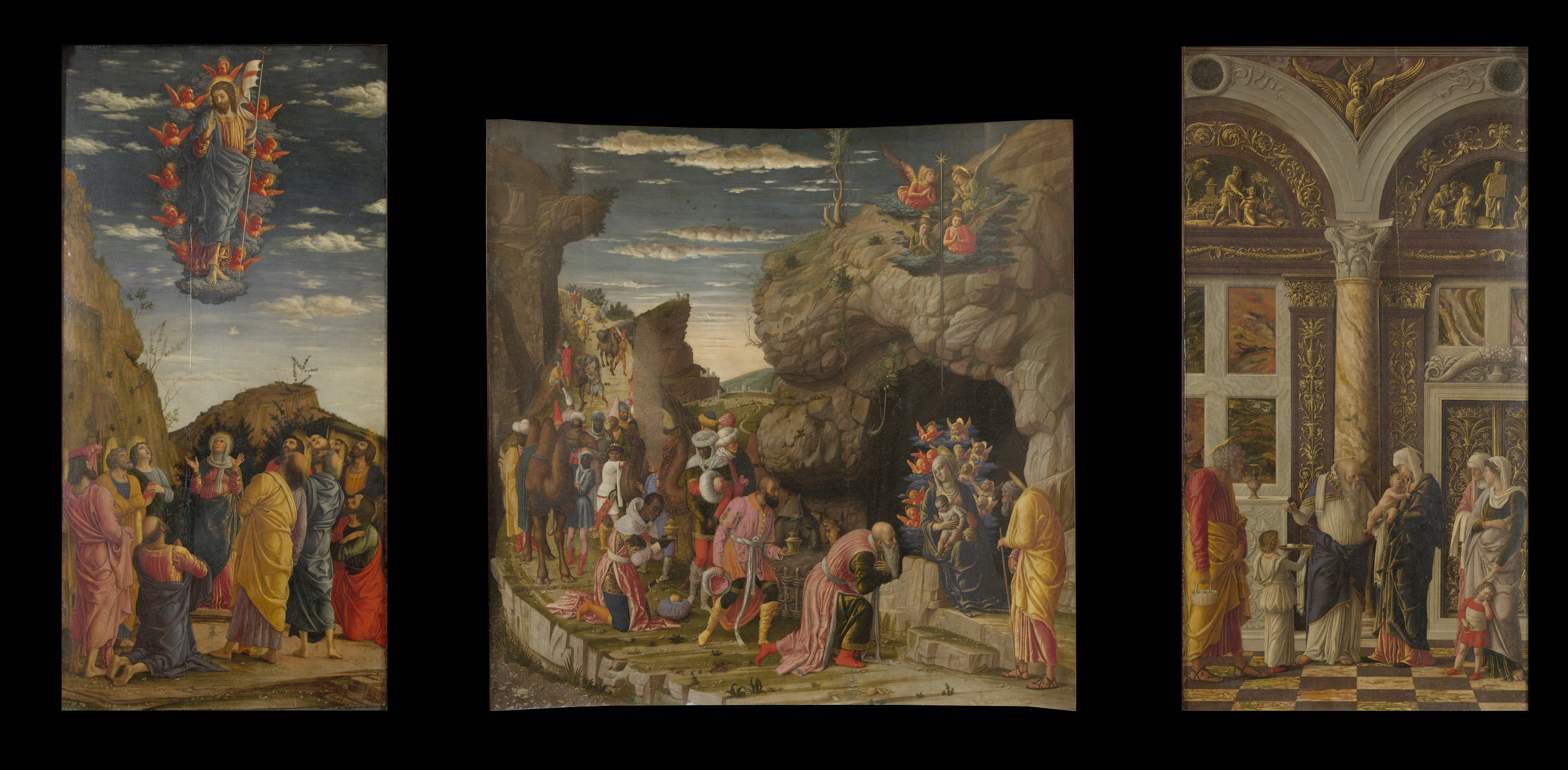
Uffizi Triptych

== See also ==
- Death of the Virgin (Anonymous)
- Death of the Virgin (Caravaggio)
