= Death of the Virgin (van der Goes) =

Triptych by Hugo van der Goes

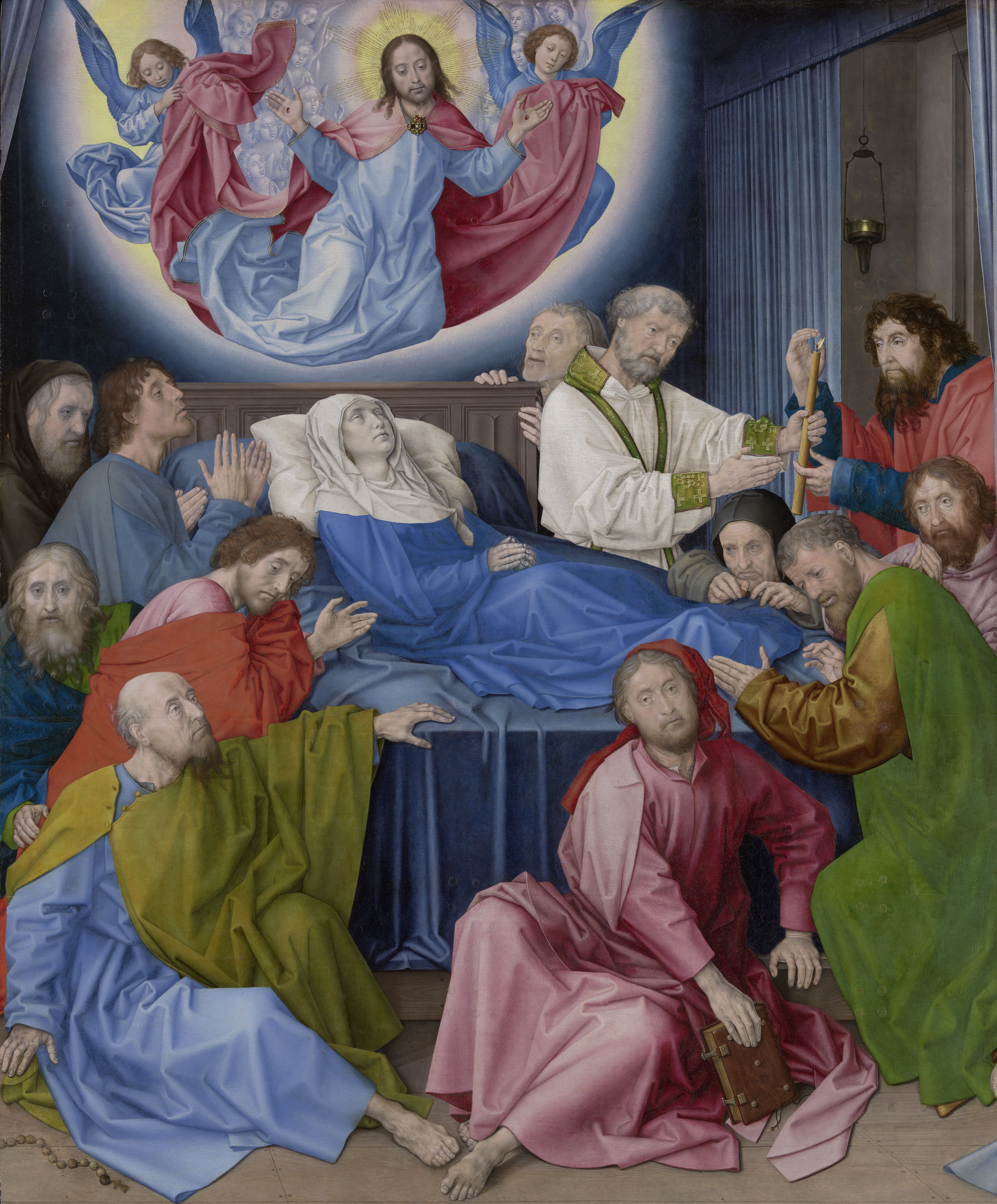
The Death of the Virgin, c. 1472–1480. 147.8cm x 122.5cm. Groeningemuseum, Bruges.

The Death of the Virgin is an oil-on-oak-panel painting by the Flemish artist Hugo van der Goes. It was completed c. 1472–1480 and shows the Virgin Mary on her deathbed surrounded by the Twelve Apostles.

The scene is based on Jacobus de Voragine's thirteenth-century "Legenda aurea" which relates how the apostles were brought, at Mary's request, on clouds by angels to a house near Mount Zion to be with her in her final three days. On the third day Jesus appeared above her bed in a halo of light surrounded by angels to accept her soul at the point when his name was finally mentioned. Three days later he reappeared to accept her body.

== Commission ==
The Death of the Virgin is first recorded in a 1777 inventory of the Cistercian Ten Duinen Abbey in Bruges, Belgium. The painting was almost certainly commissioned; the art historian Till-Holger Borchert believes that Johannes Crabbe (Jan Crabbe) commissioned the painting for the Ten Duinen abbey.

Along with his Monforte and Portinari Altarpiece, it is one of van der Goes's most important, but likely one of the last paintings completed before his death in 1482. According to Borchert the panel "belongs to the most impressive and artistically mature achievements of Early Netherlandish painting", while Lorne Campbell described the painting as van der Goes's "most idiosyncratic masterpiece".

== Description ==
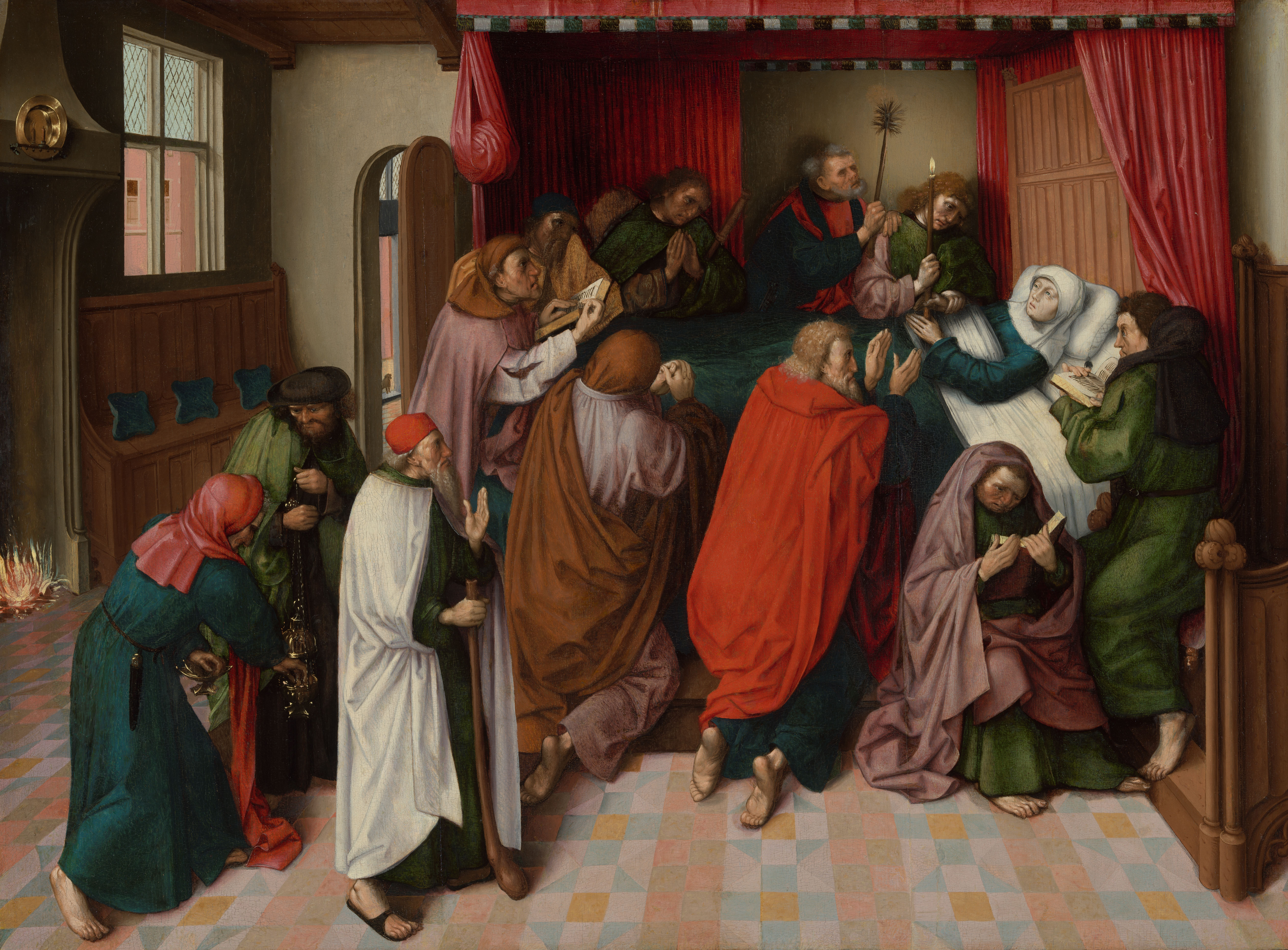
Copy of the Berlin work attributed to the Master of the Amsterdam Death of the Virgin, a follower of van der Goes. c 1500, Rijksmuseum, Amsterdam.

Mary is depicted lying in a blue robe with a white headdress on a timber bed, her head resting on a white pillow against a headboard. Her skin is thin and pallid, her hands clasped in prayer. She is surrounded by the twelve apostles who crowd around her bed. Peter is dressed in the white robes of a priest and holds a candle which in the then contemporary ritual will be handed to the dying woman. Above her Christ appears in a halo of light, holding his arms open to receive Mary's soul, while his palms are open to display the wounds sustained at Calvary. With this gesture, Christ identifies himself as both redeemer and conqueror of death.

Death of the Virgin marks a break in van der Goes's style; line has become more important, setting is eliminated and the image lacks depth and is tightly contracted with only the bed, door and the body of the Virgin giving spatial indicators. It is renowned for not showing the apostles either in the traditional idealised manner nor as conventional figure types, but instead representing each as a unique individual, displaying their grief through a range of expressions and gestures, from sorrow and despair, to empathy and compassion. Because the artist has not used traditional representation, it is difficult to identify each apostle.

The work is the best-known of several paintings after the death of Mary attributed to van der Goes or followers. A copy is in St. Salvator's Cathedral(Bruges) treasury, and two similar paintings are in the Berlin State Museums, the National Gallery, London, are attributed as "after van der Goes". They are usually thought to be later versions of a pen on paper drawing in the Herzog Anton Ulrich Museum, Brunswick, probably a copy of an original preparatory sketch by van der Goes. These works are similar to the Bruges paintings, but show the image in reverse. Infra-red photography shows that the composition was planned in a highly detailed manner before the underdrawing was applied. Art historian Lorne Campbell writes, "it is possible that the Brunswick drawing reflects one of his earliest ideas for the Bruges painting and that the Berlin, Prague and London pictures echo, however distantly, a later stage in his development of the Bruges composition.

== Interpretation ==
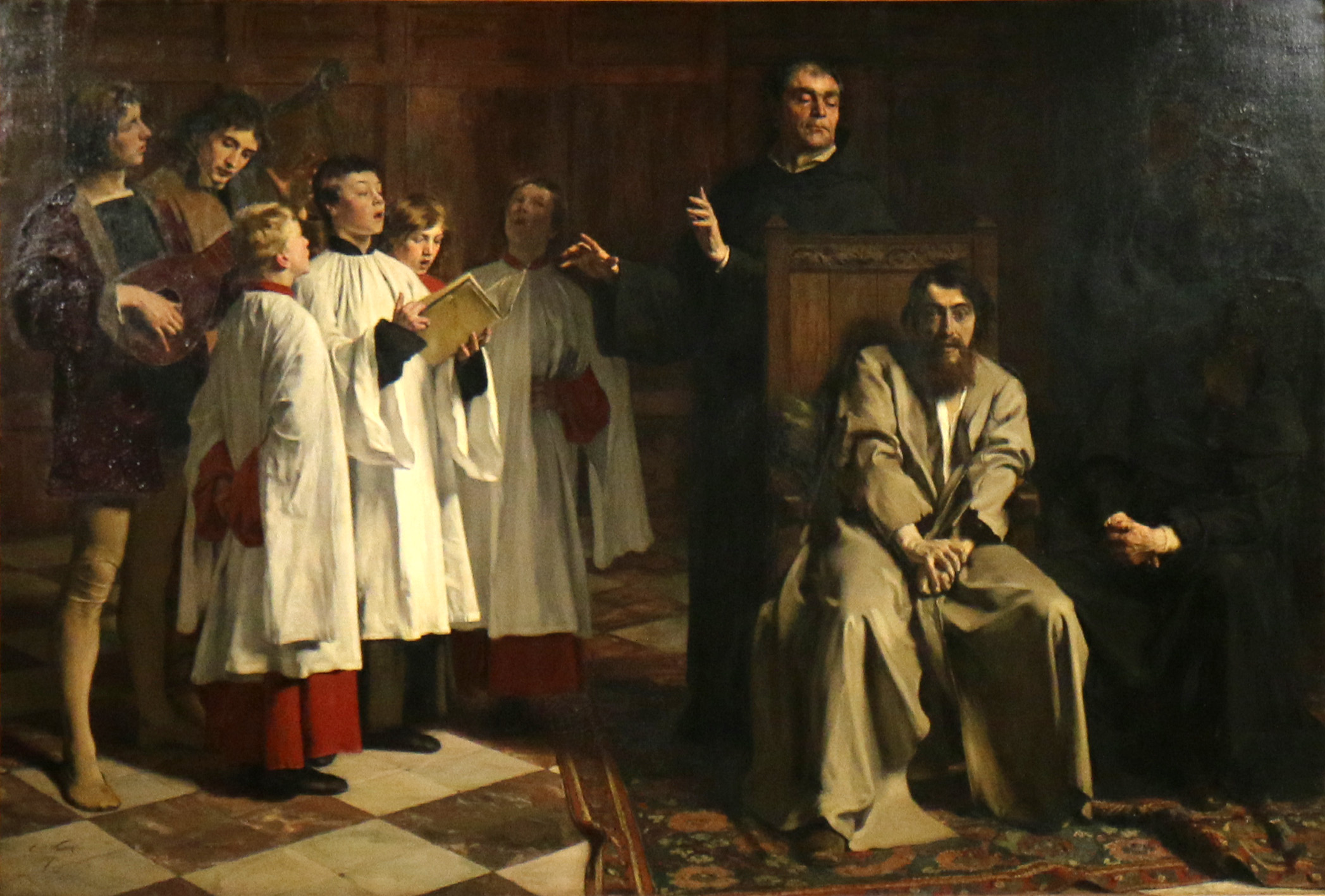
Emile Wauters, The painter Hugo van der Goes in the Rouge-Cloître Abbey, 1872

The painting's date and meaning have been subject to debate. Van der Goes spent his final years submerged in depression. A number of art historians, including Max Friedländer, view the work as painted c. 1480 when the artist first began to express the signs of mental illness. Van der Goes' susceptibility to depression was suspected by his contemporary Gaspar Ofhuys, who recorded a night in 1480 when van der Goes began to excitedly talk about how he was a doomed and lost soul, and attempted to commit suicide and had to be forcibly held down. This account significantly enhanced the painting's value in the eyes of late-19th-century painters and collectors. Vincent van Gogh mentions van der Goes three times in his letters, first in 1873 to his brother Theo and on two other occasions when he wrote that he identified with the earlier artist's portrait in Emile Wauters's 1872 painting Hugo van der Goes Undergoing Treatment at the Red Cloister.

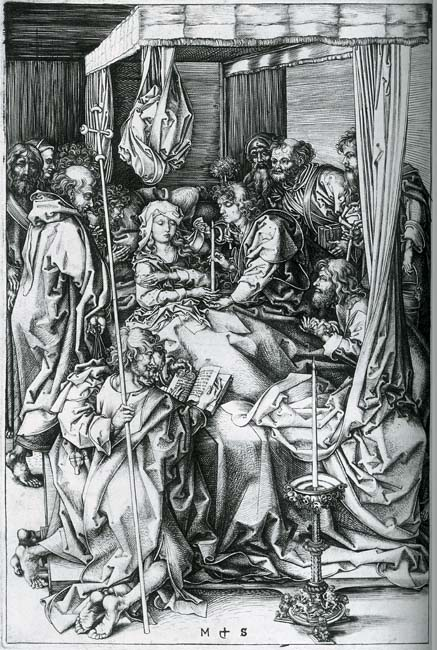
Martin Schongauer, The Death of the Virgin, engraving, early 1470s.

The art historian Erwin Panofsky described van der Goes as "the first artist to live up to a concept unknown to the Middle Ages but cherished by the European mind ever after, the concept of a genius both blessed and cursed with his diversity from ordinary human beings." Panofsky describes how the work's flatness represents an "irrationality of space, light, colour, [and the] expression of the artist's mental illness".

Van der Goes was a highly progressive and original artist. The inspiration for the painting is evident in Petrus Christus' c 1457–67 Death of the Virgin and by works attributed to the workshop of Rogier van der Weyden. Van der Goes's version bears many similarity to Martin Schongauer's c 1470–75 engraving of the same name, especially in its tone and mood, the depiction of Mary and the representation of the apostles seated to Mary's left. Yet there are significant differences; the bed in Schongauer's engraving is canopied and the distribution of the apostles is very different in the two works. The Schongauer is dated to at least 1475, and it is a matter of significant and at times harsh and divisive critical debate as to which work came first (see above).

== See also ==
- List of works by Hugo van der Goes

== Sources ==
- Borchert, Till-Holger. The Death of the Virgin, in: Van Eyck to Durer. Borchert, Till-Holger (ed). London: Thames & Hudson, 2011. ISBN 978-0-500-23883-7
- Campbell, Lorne. The Fifteenth Century Netherlandish Paintings. London: National Gallery, 1998. ISBN 978-1-85709-171-7
- Stefan Kemperdick and Erik Eising; with the collaboration of Borchert, Till-Holger, Hugo van der Goes : between pain and bliss for the Gemäldegalerie - Staatliche Museen zu Berlin. English ed, München: Hirmer Verlag, 2023. ISBN 978-3-7774-3848-1
