= Jan Mostaert =

Dutch Renaissance painter (c. 1475–1550s)

Jan Jansz Mostaert
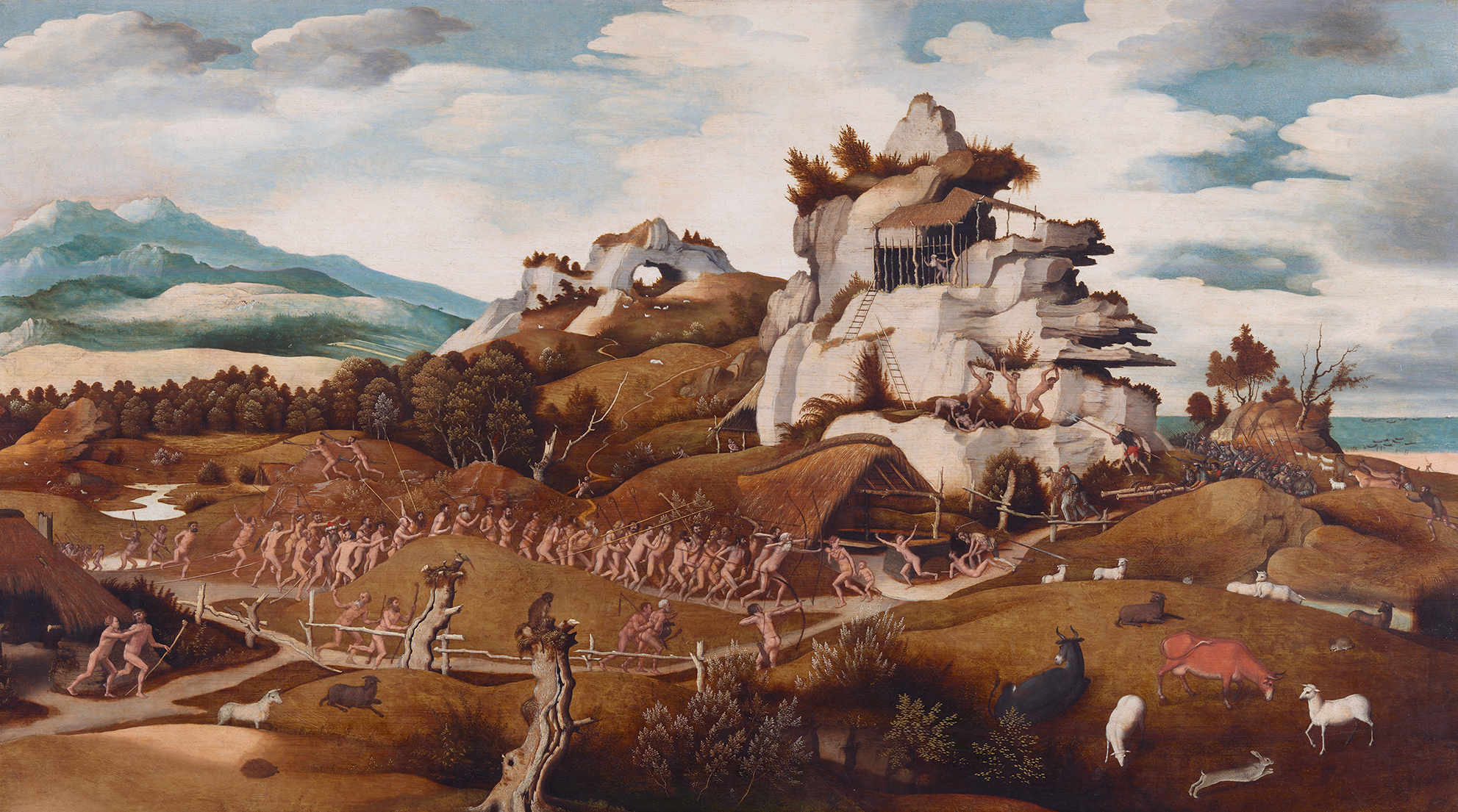
- Landscape with an Episode from the Conquest of America
- Born: c. 1475, Haarlem
- Died: 1552/1553 (aged 76–78), Haarlem
- Known for: Painting

Jan Mostaert (c. 1475 – 1552/1553) was a Dutch Renaissance painter who is known mainly for his religious subjects and portraits. One of his most famous creations was the Landscape with an Episode from the Conquest of America.

There are very few details about the life of Jan Mostaert that are known with any certainty. The traditional account of his life was based on the biography written by the 16th century Flemish artist and art historian Karel van Mander and included in his Schilder-boeck, published in Haarlem in 1604. Modern scholarship questions many of the assertions about the life of Mostaert made by Karel van Mander.

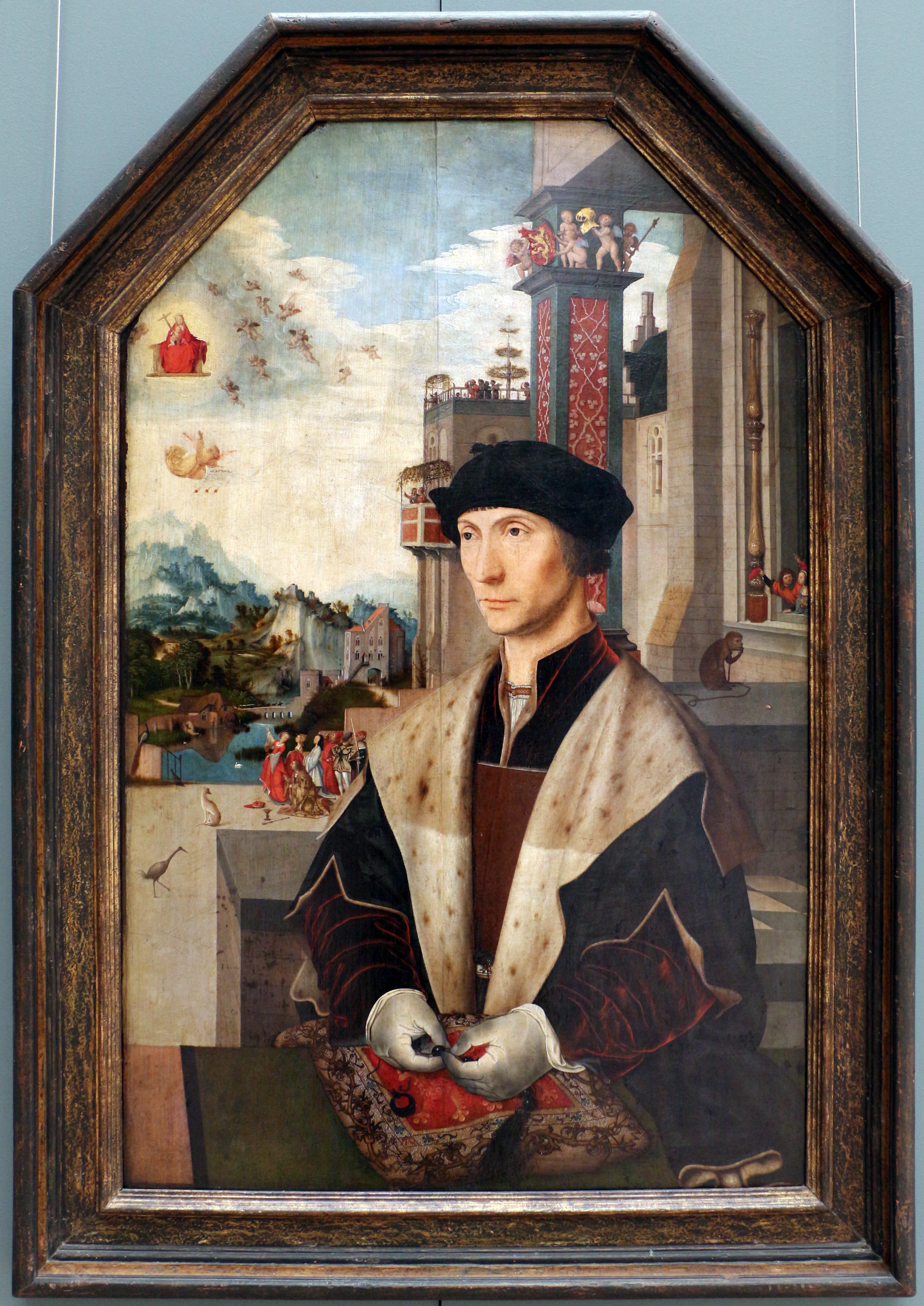
Portrait of the Knight Abel van Coustler, after 1512

One of these is van Mander's assertion that he was appointed 'painctre aux honneurs' ("painter with honors") by Margaret of Austria, the governor of the Habsburg Netherlands; it does not seem that he became Margaret's court painter, although there are two mentions of him in her accounting records. Recent art historians think he probably worked in the provincial town of Haarlem, some way from the larger cities of the southern Netherlands, for all or most of his career.

== Life ==
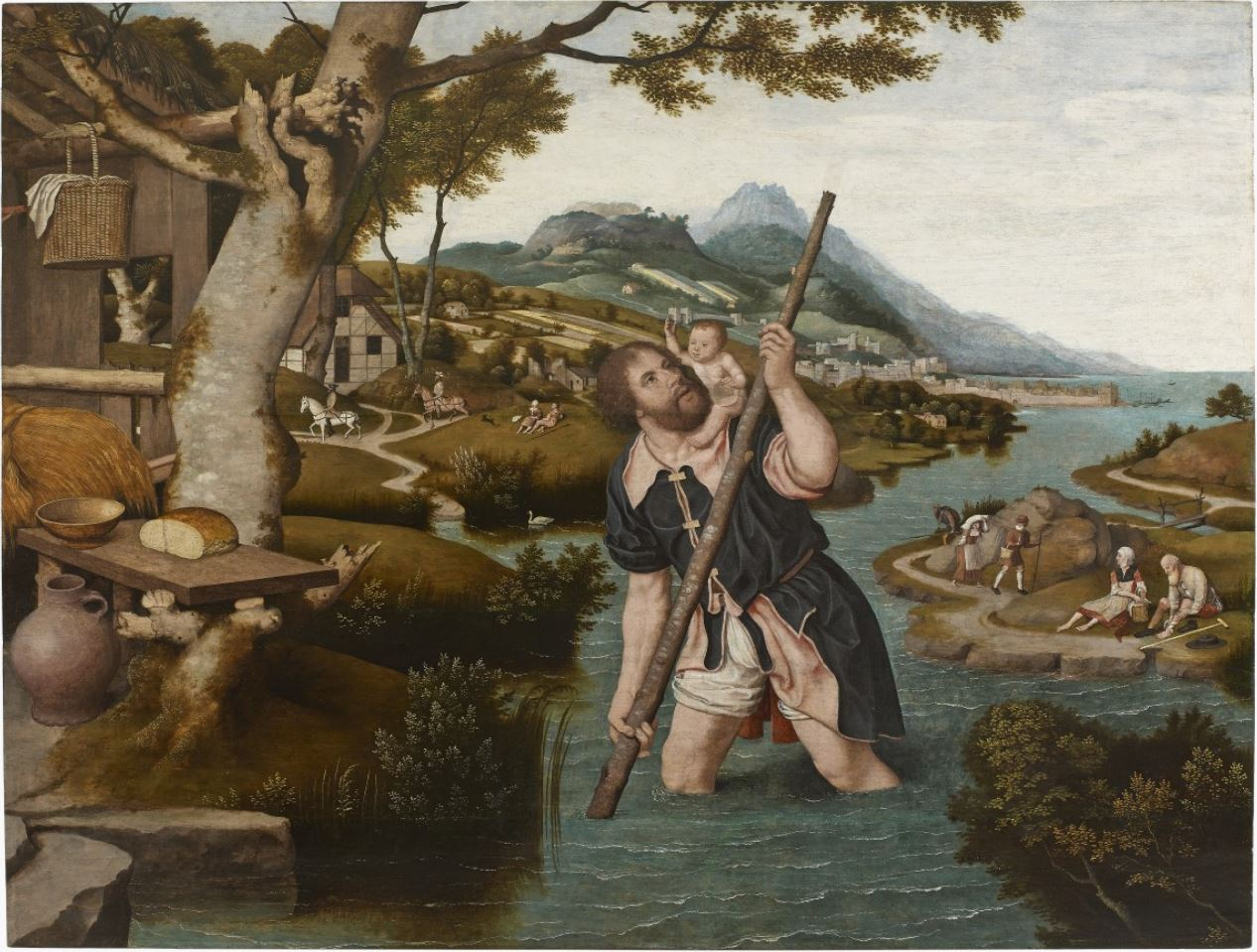
St. Christopher, Museum Mayer van den Bergh

Mostaert was born in Haarlem as the son of a mill owner also named Jan and Alijt Dircx. Karel van Mander stated that Mostaert was a pupil of Jacob van Haarlem, the artist who painted the altarpiece of the Carrier's guild in the St. Bavochurch of Haarlem.

Mostaert's name first appeared in city records in 1498, the year he bought a house in his birthplace. The artist is documented in Haarlem almost every year from 1498 to 1552 except for a ten-year period between 1516 and 1526. In 1500 Mostaert was commissioned to paint the shutters for a receptacle housing the relics of Saint Bavo in the Groote Kerk, Haarlem. From this date he began to be listed in the records of the Haarlem Guild of St. Luke, and continued to be frequently listed until 1549. He became deacon of the painters' guild in 1507, and again in 1543 and 1544.

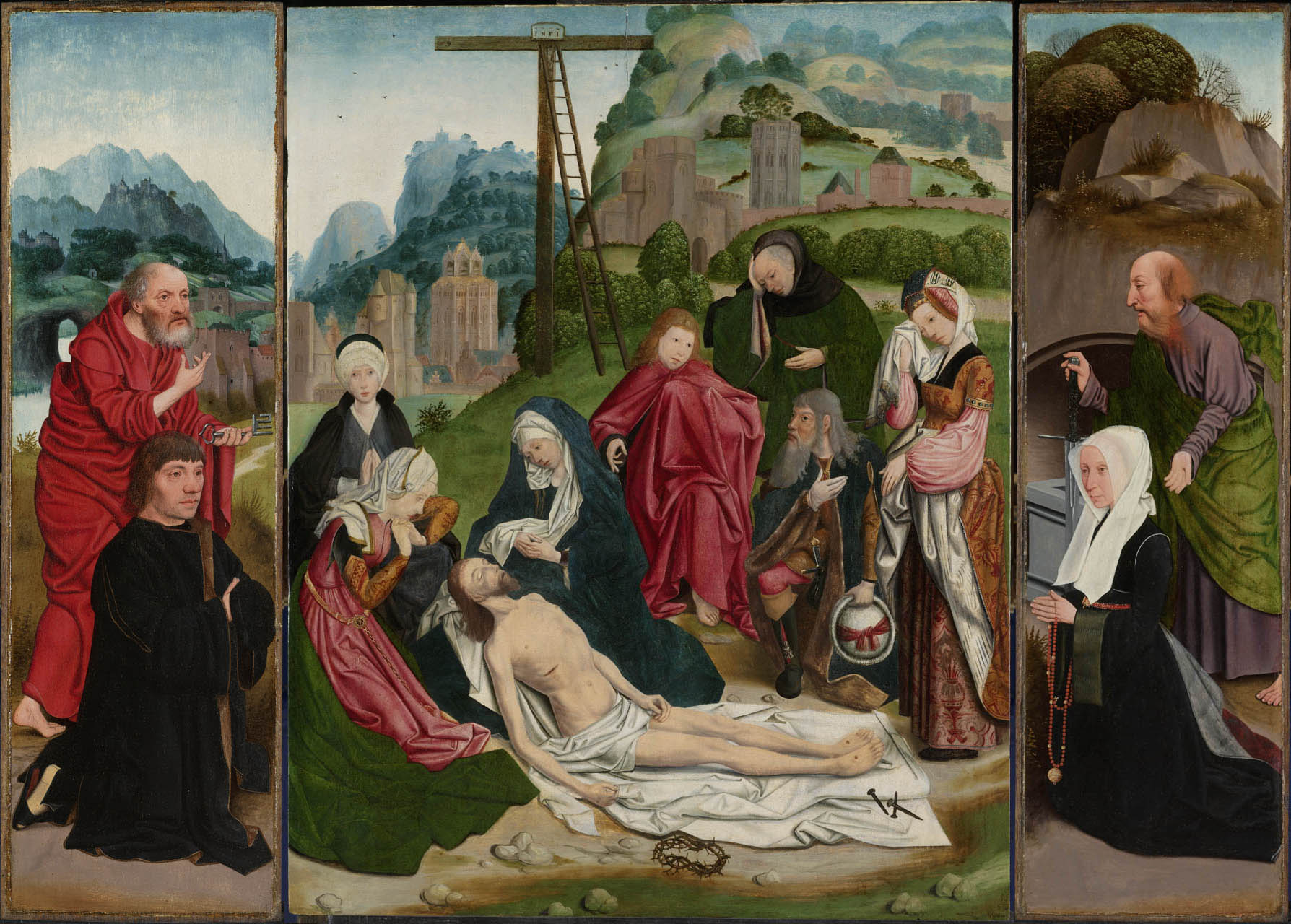
Lamentation, based on the same theme by Geertgen tot Sint Jans

Margaret of Austria, the governor of the Habsburg Netherlands, appointed Mostaert 'painctre aux honneurs' (painter with honors) in March 1518. Van Mander wrote that he worked for Margaret for 18 years and was commissioned by her to create portraits. As there is no evidence that he was her court painter, there is no reason to trust Van Mander's statement that he worked at Margaret's court in Mechelen for 18 years. He is missing from the records in Haarlem for a string of only 10 years, and only two documents from 1519 and 1521 give any mention that he was working at her court at the time.

The current view of art historians is that Mostaert worked his entire life in Haarlem. Since his house was rented to others in 1553 and payments to him stopped around Easter 1553, it is believed that he died early in 1553 or perhaps late in 1552. In 1554 his name was crossed out from the list of members of the Haarlem Guild of St. Luke.

Mostaert married Angnyese (Agnes) Martijnsdr, the widow of Claes Claesz Suycker, before 8 June 1498. His wife died before July 1532. Mostaert was commercially successful and owned multiple houses in Haarlem.

Van Mander states that Mostaert had a son who was a common painter. It is no longer believed by art historians that Frans Mostaert and Gillis Mostaert were the grandsons of Jan Mostaert.

== Works ==
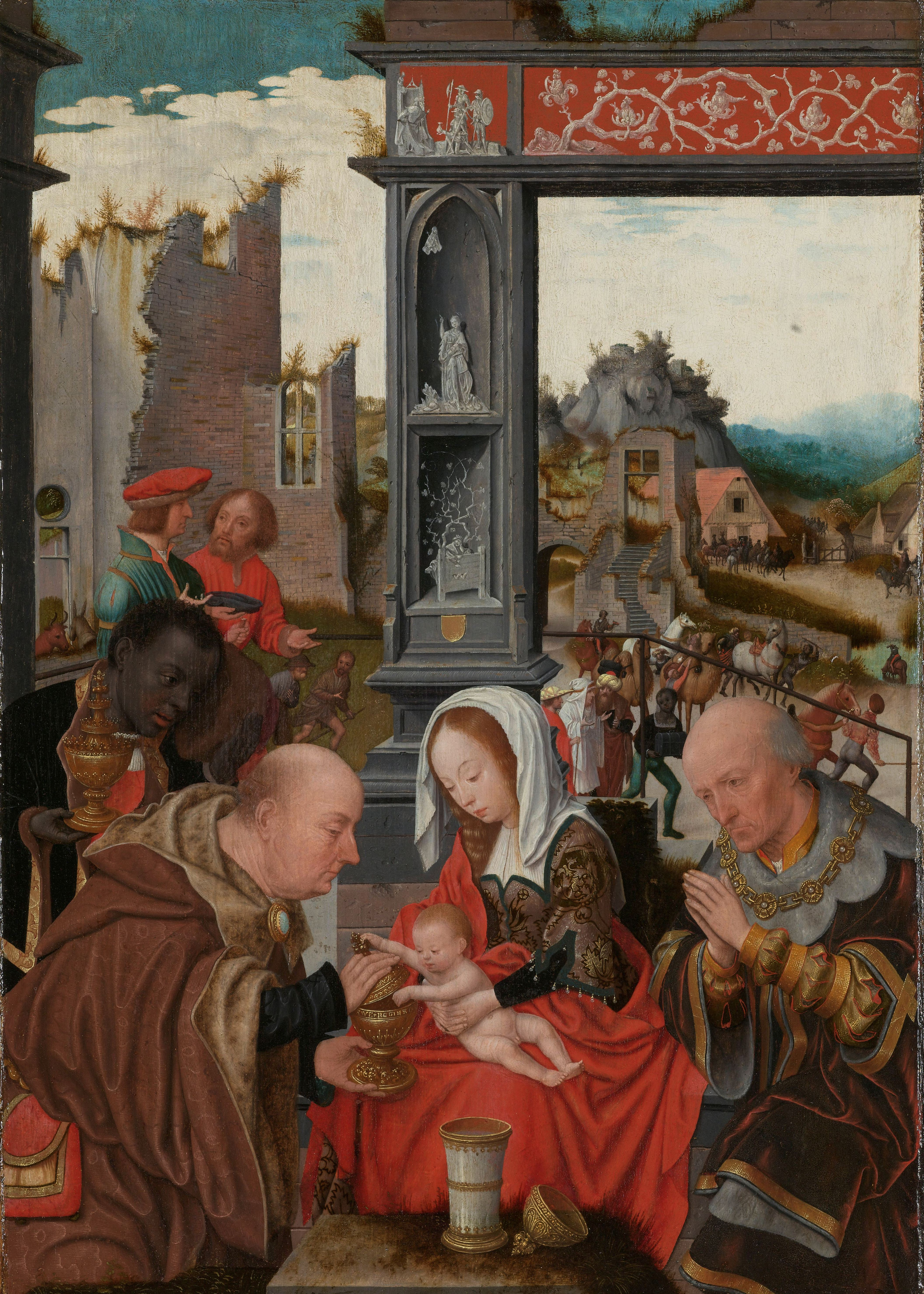
Adoration of the Magi, c. 1520–25, Rijksmuseum

Mostaert was principally a painter of portraits and religious subjects. He also had a fascination with primitive peoples and lands, as seen from his West Indies Landscape. At around 1520–25 he presented the family life of Adam and Eve in First Family as primitives working on their land. Mostaert was interested in combining pagan and Christian interpretations of humanity's origins. Mostaert's teacher Jacob van Haarlem may have actually been the anonymous Master of the Brunswick Diptych. Karel van Mander described several works in detail, including his strange landscape of the West Indies, which he considered to be an unfinished work. Much of Mostaert's work was destroyed in the great fire of Haarlem in 1576, and some paintings once attributed to him are now attributed to Adriaen Isenbrant.

His earliest works are noticeably influenced by Geertgen tot Sint Jans, an earlier Haarlem artist. Some believed that Mostaert was actually apprenticed to Geertgen but it is doubtful that the artist had any apprentices or workshop assistants during his career. From Geertgen, Mostaert adopted a refined style and thoughtful compositions for his works, as well as the stiff, angular look of his figures.

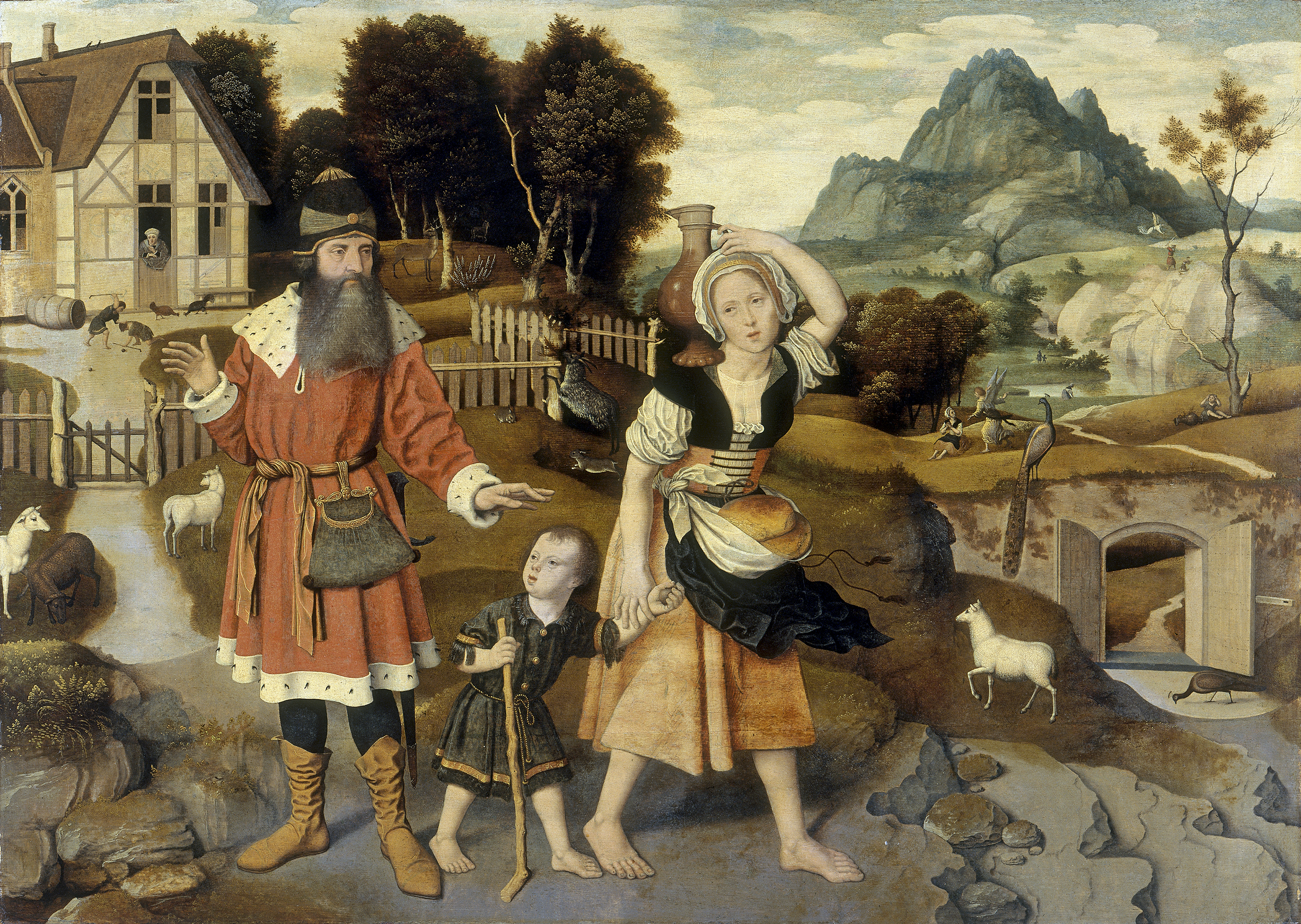
The banishment of Hagar and Ishmael

Between 1510 and 1516, Mostaert developed a delicate style where his doll-like figures inhabited bright, blue-skied landscapes, as for example in his Adoration of the Magi (c. 1520–25, Rijksmuseum). His refined brushwork is precise, with an almost religious attention to detail. Also of note is the landscape, which demonstrates his leanings towards more romantic views with expansive hills. During the 1520s Mostaert was also influenced by Joachim Patinir's take on landscapes. Mostaert's St. Christopher, a painting with a landscape that features a river receding into an expansive and hilly background, was once even attributed to Patinir.

Mostaert's portrait work of this earlier period includes a piece entitled Portrait of Abel van den Coulster (c. 1500–10), in which an elegant, thin-faced man is situated in equally elegant surroundings. This painting also contains one of Mostaert's favorite themes, i.e. the Vision of Augustus and the Tiburtine Sibyl. The scene appears in the courtyard in the background of the Portrait of Abel van den Coulster. Another version can be seen in the grisaille reliefs on the pillar and architrave of the gate in his Adoration of the Magi (c. 1520–25, Rijksmuseum). Mostaert was known for copying original portraits for some of his courtly commissions but, as is the case with the Portrait of Abel, he also painted figures from life and added aristocratic touches. He was known for presenting his portrait sitters in three-quarter-length and placing their hands on cushions.

Being an accomplished court painter allowed for Mostaert to make a living off his art and to gain a steady patronage. The last documented reference to him is in 1549 when he petitioned the Haarlem town council for permission to live in Hoorn so that he could complete an altarpiece there.

As was common practice in 15th and 16th century Netherlands, Mostaert frequently reproduced portraits of political figures based on original models. In 1521, Mostaert gave Margaret a portrait of her third husband, Duke Philibert of Savoy, as a New Year's present. The portrait was made sixteen years after Duke Philibert's death.

== Notable works ==
=== Portrait of an African Man ===
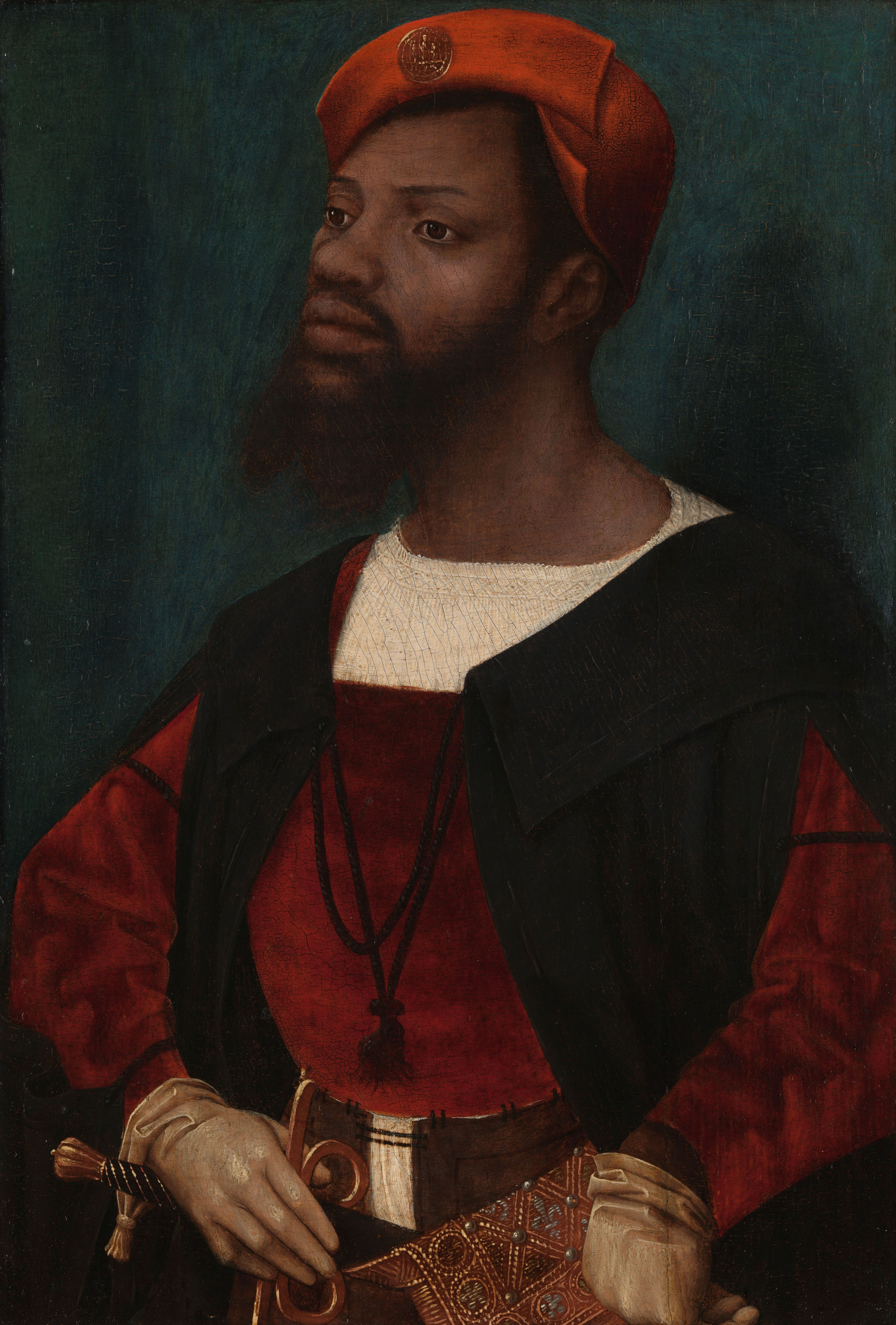
Portrait of an African Man

Mostaert painted The Portrait of an African Man, which is one of the earliest and the only individual portrait of a black African that has survived. Painted around 1525–30 the work is in the collection of the Rijksmuseum. It is not known exactly who this man was but there are indications that he was either associated with Margaret's court or was an attendant of her nephew, Charles V, who had a black archer, Christophle le More, among his bodyguards. The man wears rich clothes, gloves, and holds a sword, all indicative of his important status. The insignia on his hat and bag allude to possible Spanish or Portuguese origins. Many of the Africans who arrived in Europe in late medieval and early Renaissance times were scholars and advisers.

=== West Indies Landscape ===
Mostaert's most famous work is the West Indies Landscape (c. 1535, Rijksmuseum), which is believed to be a view of the Zuni pueblos in New Mexico. Having never travelled to the Americas, Mostaert had to imagine what the New World looked like. There was speculation that the artist may have seen sketches of the landscapes but this is unlikely since most pictorial documentation of the times was of exotic animals, tools or costumes, rather than panoramic views. Also, the fanciful cliffs seem to be influenced by Patinir's landscape style rather than authentic renderings. It is believed that Mostaert created the painting based on either written or oral accounts of the newly discovered area to which he would have been privy thanks to his contacts at the court of Margaret of Austria, the aunt of Charles V.

Although the narrative in the painting was thought to depict a number of different events, including Columbus on the island of Guanaja, Hernán Cortés in Mexico, and the Portuguese invasion of Brazil, it is actually the story of Coronado's search for the Seven Cities of Gold in the Zuni village of Cibola in New Mexico and Arizona in 1540–42.

The best evidence that the picture is based on Coronado's story can be found on the right side of the painting, by the base of the cliffs. On his travels, Coronado was stoned at the entrance to the village by the native Indians. He was rescued by two of his officers who came to his aid and warded off the incoming Indians. Mostaert may have added the event to the landscape to lend it a measure of credibility.

The landscape's terrain, as well as the look of the natives, also matches the descriptions of Pedro de Castañeda, a member of Coronado's team, made during his travels. According to him, the land was full of cliffs, some with ladders on them reaching to different levels, the people were tall and naked, and their huts were built into the ground and made of straw, the roofs protruding from the ground.

Mostaert devotes only a small section of the painting to Coronado and his men, showing us instead the unity and strength of the native peoples fighting for their land. The painting is one of the earliest depictions of the Europeans' invasions of the Americas and of the "noble savage."

== Return of looted work ==
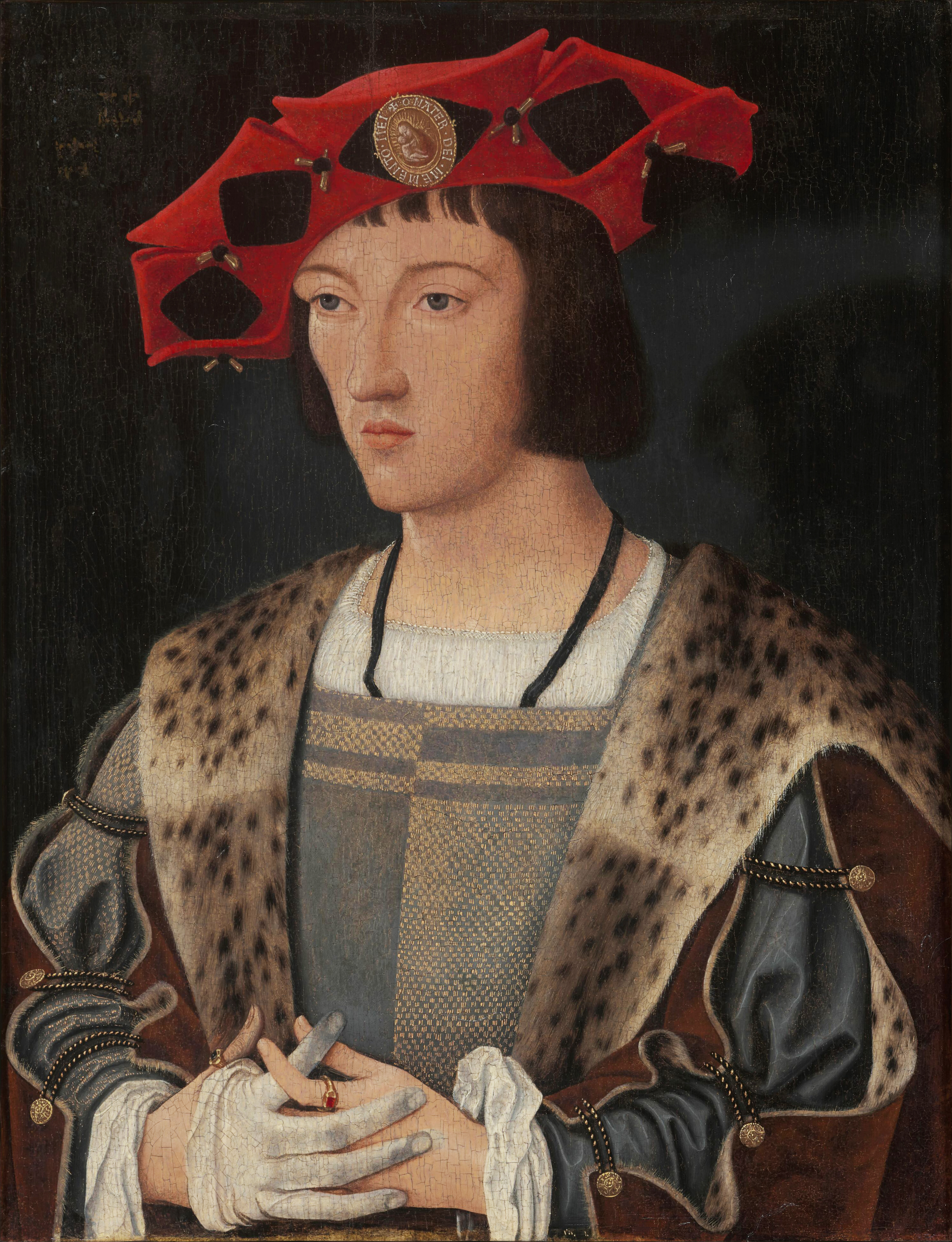
Portrait of a Courtier

Mostaert's Portrait of a Courtier, a painting that until 2005 had been in the collection of the Virginia Museum of Fine Arts since 1949, was found to have been confiscated by Nazi forces in 1941 from its rightful owners in Poland. It had come from a collection of artworks amassed by princess Izabela Fleming née Czartoryska. The paintings were moved to Warsaw as war loomed but were inevitably seized by the Germans.

The VMFA made the decision to deaccession and transfer the work to the Polish Embassy, acting on behalf of the rightful owners' family. The family donated the painting to the Czartoryski Museum in Kraków, Poland.

The small, oil-on-panel portrait is known to have had at least three different titles: Duke of Burgundy, Portrait of Charles VIII, and Portrait of a Courtier. It was once paired with a portrait of a lady, thought to be Anne of Brittany, the wife of Charles VIII, King of France.
