= Madonna and Child with Saints =

Subject in Christian art

The Madonna and Child with Saints are the subject of several artworks.

== Two saints ==
- Madonna and Child with St Dominic and St Thomas Aquinas (Fra Angelico)
- Madonna and Child Enthroned with Saints Paul and Francis (Antoniazzo Romano)
- Madonna and Child with Two Saints (Bicci) – Saints Blaise and Michael
- Madonna and Child Enthroned with Two Male Saints (Cima da Conegliano) – Saint Dionysius and another male saint (possibly Victor or Elutherius); Saints Peter and Paul also appear with Christ in the lunette
- Madonna and Child with Michael the Archangel and St Andrew (Cima da Congeliano)
- Madonna and Child with Saints James the Great and Jerome (Cima)
- Madonna and Child with Saints John the Baptist and Catherine of Alexandria (Cima da Conegliano)
- Madonna and Child Enthroned with Two Virgin Martyrs (Cima da Congeliano)
- Virgin and Child with Saints and Donors (Cima da Conegliano) – Saint Anthony Abbot and a female saint
- Virgin and Child with Saints (attributed to Cima) – Saints John the Evangelist (probably) and Nicholas
- Madonna and Child with Saints (Cima, Nivå) – a female saint and a male saint
- Madonna and Child with Saints Elizabeth and John the Baptist (Correggio)
- Madonna and Child with Saints Francis and Quirinus (Correggio)
- Madonna and Child with Saints and Donor (Carlo Crivelli) – Saints Francis and Bernardino
- Madonna and Child with the Infant St John the Baptist and Saint Barbara (Daniele da Volterra)
- Virgin and Child with Canon van der Paele (Jan van Eyck) – Saints Donatian and George
- Madonna and Child with Saints Julian and Lawrence (Gentile da Fabriano)
- Madonna and Child with Two Saints (Gentile da Fabriano) – Saints Francis and Clare
- Madonna and Child with Two Saints and a Donor (Gentile da Fabriano) – Saints Catherine and Nicholas
- Madonna and Child with St. John the Baptist and St. Mary Magdalene (Neroccio di Bartolomeo de' Landi)
- Madonna and Child with St Michael and St Bernardino (Neroccio di Bartolomeo de' Landi)
- The Virgin and Child with Saint Anne and Saint John the Baptist (Leonardo da Vinci)
- Madonna with Child and Saints (Filippino Lippi) – Saints Martin and Catherine
- Madonna with Child between Sts. Flavian and Onuphrius (Lorenzo Lotto)
- The Madonna Enthroned (Master Martin) – Saints Catherine and Elizabeth of Hungary
- Madonna and Child with Saint Catherine of Alexandria and Saint Barbara (Master of Hoogstraeten)
- Virgin and Child with Saints Barbara and Catherine (Quentin Matsys)
- Madonna and Child with Saint James and Saint Dominic (Hans Memling)
- Madonna and Child Enthroned with Saints John the Baptist and Augustine (Ioannis Permeniates)
- Madonna and Child Enthroned with Saints John the Baptist and Sebastian (Pietro Perugino)
- Madonna and Child with Saints Herculanus and Constantius (Pietro Perugino)
- Madonna and Child with Saints John the Baptist and Catherine of Alexandria (Pietro Perugino)
- Madonna and Child with Saints John the Evangelist and Augustine (Pietro Perugino)
- Madonna and Child with Two Saints (Perugino, Vienna) – Saint Catherine and another female saint (perhaps Rose of Viterbo or Mary Magdalene)
- Madonna and Child with Saints Peter and Paul (Pietro Perugino or his studio)
- Madonna and Child with Two Angels, Saint Rose and Saint Catherine (Pietro Perugino and Andrea Aloigi)
- Madonna and Child with Two Saints (Pisanello) – Saints Anthony Abbot and George
- Madonna and Child with Saint Dominic and Saint Martha of Bethany (Andrea Previtali)
- Madonna and Child with Saints John the Baptist and Catherine of Alexandria (Andrea Previtali)
- Madonna and Child with Saint Sebastian and Saint Vincent Ferrer (Andrea Previtali)
- Madonna and Child with Saints James the Great and Jerome (Romanino)
- Madonna and Child with Two Saints (Signorelli) – Saints Jerome and Bernard
- Madonna and Child with Saints Luke and Catherine of Alexandria (Titian)
- Virgin and Child Between Saints Anthony of Padua and Roch (Titian)
- The Virgin and Child with Saint George and Saint Dorothy (Titian)
- Virgin and Child with Saint John the Baptist and an Unidentified Saint (Titian)
- Madonna and Child with Saint Jerome and Saint Dorothy (Francesco Vecellio)
- Piazza Madonna (Andrea del Verrocchio and workshop) – Saints John the Baptist and Donatus of Fiesole

== Three saints ==
- Madonna and Child with Saints (Agostino Carracci) – a bishop saint and Saints Margaret, John the Baptist and Cecilia
- Madonna and Child with Saints (Annibale Carracci, 1588) – Saints Francis, Matthew and John the Baptist
- Madonna and Child with Saints (Annibale Carracci, 1593) – Saints John the Baptist, John the Evangelist and Catherine
- Madonna and Child with Three Saints (Mantegna) – a female saint (possibly Mary Magdalene), Saint Joseph and another male saint
- Virgin and Child with Saints Anthony Abbot, Jerome and Francis (Titian)
- Virgin and Child with Saints Stephen, Jerome and Maurice (Titian, Paris)
- Virgin and Child with Saints Stephen, Jerome and Maurice (Titian, Vienna)

== Four saints ==
- San Zaccaria Altarpiece (Giovanni Bellini) – Saints Peter, Catherine, Lucy and Jerome
- Madonna and Child with Four Saints and Donor (Giovanni Bellini) – Saints John the Baptist, Francis, Jerome and Sebastian
- Madonna and Child with Saints (Cima, Berlin) — Saints Peter, Romuald, Benedict of Nursia and Paul
- Madonna and Child with Angels and Saints (Filippo Lippi) – Saints Augustine, Ambrose, Gregory and Jerome
- Madonna and Child with Saints (Lotto) – Saints Peter and Francis, and two other male saints
- The Virgin and Child with Four Holy Virgins (Master of the Virgo inter Virgines) – Saints Catherine, Cecilia, Ursula and Barbara
- Madonna and Child Enthroned with Saints (Moretto) – Saints Eusebia, Andrew, Domno and Domneone
- Santa Maria in Porto Altarpiece (Ercole de' Roberti) – Saints Augustine, Elizabeth, Anne and Pietro degli Onesti
- Madonna and Child with Saints (Signorelli, Arezzo) – Saints Stephen and Jerome, and two bishop saints
- Madonna and Child with Saints (Tintoretto) – Saints Catherine, Augustine, Mark and John the Baptist
- Madonna and Child with Four Saints (Titian) – Saints John the Baptist, Paul, Mary Magdalene and Jerome
- Madonna and Child with Saints (Veronese) – Saints Elizabeth, Catherine and John the Baptist

== Five saints ==
- Madonna and Child with Saints Polyptych (Duccio) – Saints Agnes, John the Evangelist, John the Baptist and Mary Magdalene
- Madonna and Child with Saints (Moretto, Verona) – Saints Catherine, Lucy, Cecilia, Barbara and Agnes
- Pucci Altarpiece (Pontormo) – Saints Jerome, Joseph, John the Baptist, Francis and John the Evangelist
- Virgin and Child with Saint Anne and Four Saints (Pontormo) – Saints Anne, Peter, Benedict, Sebastian and the Good Thief
- Madonna and Child Enthroned with Saints (Raphael) – Saints Peter, Catherine, Lucy and Paul, and the infant Saint John the Baptist

== Six saints ==
- San Giobbe Altarpiece (Giovanni Bellini) – Saints Francis, John the Baptist, Job, Sebastian, Dominic and Louis of Toulouse
- Madonna and Child with Saints (circle of Giovanni Bellini) – Saints Sebastian, Francis, John the Baptist, Jerome, and Anthony of Padua, and a female saint
- Dragan Altarpiece (Cima da Congeliano) – Saints George, Nicholas, Anthony Abbot and Sebastian, and two female saints (possibly Catherine and Lucy)
- Montini Altarpiece (Cima da Conegliano) – Saints John the Baptist, Cosmas, Damian, Apollonia, Catherine and John the Evangelist
- Madonna and Child Enthroned with Saints (Gaddi) – Saints Dominic, John the Baptist, Peter Martyr, Thomas Aquinas, Paul and Lawrence
- Madonna and Child with Saints (Mantegna) – Saints John the Baptist, Catherine and four others
- Madonna and Child with Saints (Marracci) – Saints Paulinus, Lucy, Philip Neri, Anthony Abbot, Anthony of Padua and Elizabeth of Hungary
- Madonna and Child with Saints (Master of San Lucchese) – Saints John the Baptist and Peter, two bishop saints and two female saints
- Virgin Enthroned with Saints (Signorelli) – Saints John the Baptist, Peter, Anthony of Padua (possibly), Francis and Jerome, and a bishop saint
- Virgin and Child with Saints (van der Weyden) – perhaps six saints

== Seven saints ==
- Madonna and Child with Saints (Moretto, London) – Saints Catherine, Clare, Jerome, Joseph, Bernardino, Francis and Nicholas

== Eight saints ==
- San Marco Altarpiece (Fra Angelico) – Saints Cosmas, Damian, Lawrence, John the Evangelist, Mark, Dominic, Peter Martyr and Francis
- Madonna and Child with Eight Saints (Bramantino)

== See also ==
- Sacra conversazione
- Triptych with the Virgin and Child, Saints and Donors (Master of Delft) – an undetermined number of the figures are saints; they include Saint Joseph and probably Saints Martin and Cunera
