= Madonna and Child with Two Saints =

Madonna and Child with Two Saints may refer to:

- Madonna and Child with Two Saints (Bicci) (c.1475), a tempera and gold on panel altarpiece in the Montreal Museum of Fine Arts
- Madonna and Child with Two Saints (Gentile da Fabriano) (c.1390–1395), a tempera and gold on panel painting in the Pinacoteca Malaspina, Pavia
- Madonna and Child with Two Saints (Lotto) (1508), an oil-on-panel painting in the Borghese Gallery, Rome
- Madonna and Child with Two Saints (Perugino) (c.1495), a tempera on panel painting in the Kunsthistorisches Museum, Vienna
- Madonna and Child with Two Saints (Pisanello) (c.1445), a panel painting in the National Gallery, London
- Madonna and Child with Two Saints (Signorelli) (c.1492–1493), a tempera on panel tondo painting in the Palazzo Corsini, Florence

== See also ==
- Madonna and Child with Two Saints and a Donor (c.1395–1400), a tempera and gold leaf on panel painting by Gentile da Fabriano in the Gemäldegalerie, Berlin
- Madonna and Child with Saints
