= Madonna and Child with Saints John the Baptist and Catherine of Alexandria =

Madonna and Child with Saints John the Baptist and Catherine of Alexandria may refer to:

- Madonna and Child with Saints John the Baptist and Catherine of Alexandria (Cima)
- Madonna and Child with Saints John the Baptist and Catherine of Alexandria (Perugino)
- Madonna and Child with Saints John the Baptist and Catherine of Alexandria (Previtali)

== See also ==
- Aldobrandini Madonna (Titian), with the infant John the Baptist and Catherine of Alexandria
- Madonna and Child with Saint John the Baptist and a Female Saint (Giovanni Bellini); the female saint has been identified variously as Catherine of Alexandria or Mary Magdalene
- Madonna and Child with Saints (disambiguation)
- Saint John the Baptist (disambiguation)
- Saint Catherine of Alexandria (disambiguation)
