= Madonna and Child with Three Saints =

Madonna and Child with Three Saints may refer to:

- Madonna and Child with Three Saints (Mantegna)
- Virgin and Child with Saints Anthony Abbot, Jerome and Francis (Titian)
- Virgin and Child with Saints Stephen, Jerome and Maurice (Titian, Paris)
- Virgin and Child with Saints Stephen, Jerome and Maurice (Titian, Vienna)

== See also ==
- Madonna and Child with Saints
