= Madonna and Child with St John the Baptist and St Catherine of Alexandria =

Madonna and Child with St John the Baptist and St Catherine of Alexandria may refer to:

- Madonna and Child with St John the Baptist and St Catherine of Alexandria (Perugino)
- Madonna and Child with St John the Baptist and St Catherine of Alexandria (Previtali)
