= Madonna and Child with Saints (Master of San Lucchese) =

Painting by the Master of San Lucchese

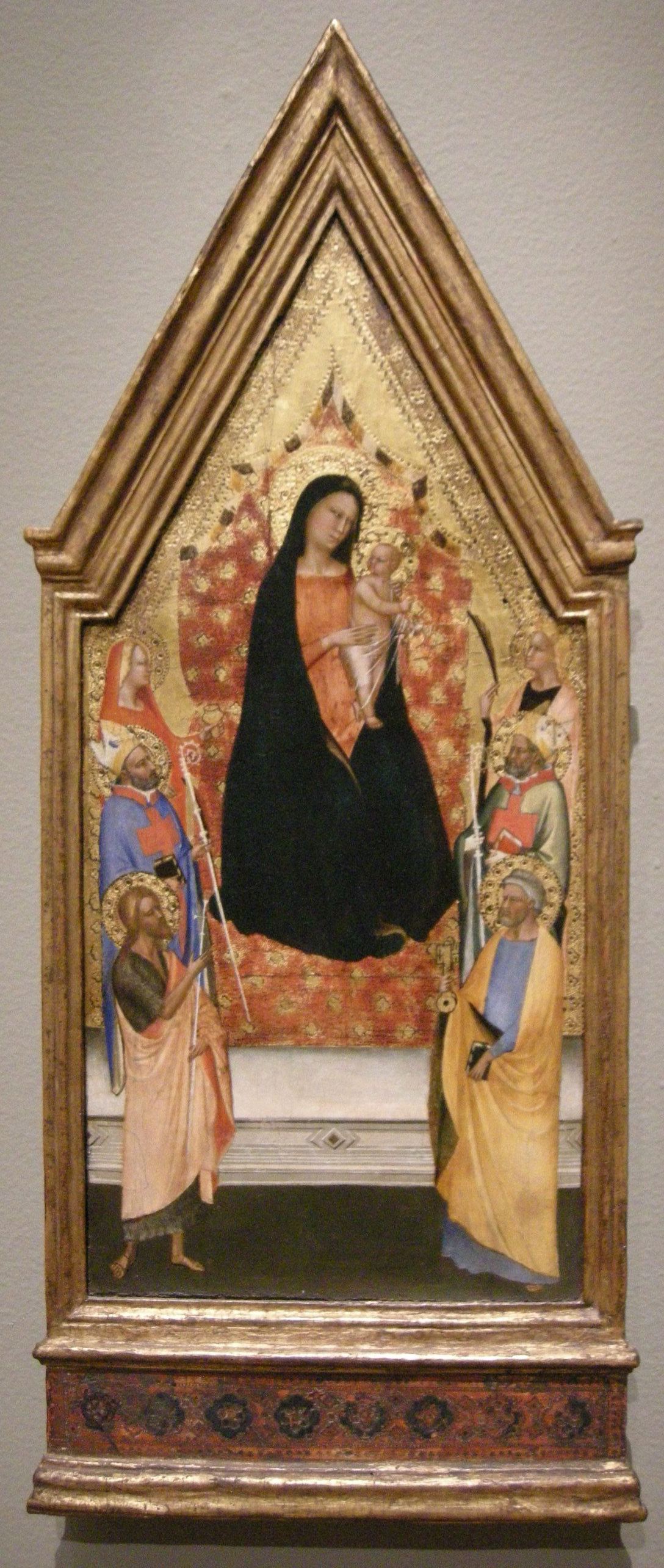
San Lucchese Madonna

Madonna and Child with Saints by the Master of San Lucchese (14th century, around 1345) is an Italian painting, with tempera and gold lead on panel as its medium. It is now in San Francisco, California, in the Legion of Honor. There are halos around the saints, Madonna and Child. The women at the end of each column are the highest elevated person. Unusually, the upper section of the work has a gold ground, but the background of the lower section shows a floor and decorated wall. The bottom of the gold ground section appears to cast a shadow onto the wall, as though it were a tapestry.

The artist's name is unknown, and he has been given a notname by historians. This piece was in Florence, in San Lucchese, in a church in Poggibonsi on the altar.

The Madonna who stands at the middle of the piece. At her left and right stand 3 figures on each side, 6 in total. There are two females and 4 males. She and the child both have auras around their heads, as well as the individuals standing beside her. She is looking at the child and the child back into her eyes, but all the other people are looking at the center of the piece. Some of the other people may be Saint Peter, Mary Magdalen, John the Baptist, Anthony Abbot, Paul, and Saint Augustine, Lawrence, Paul, and maybe Catherine of Alexandria?

In the middle the Madonna is the central and biggest figure in the painting, holding a small child. All of the other saints and angels are small compared to size. It is a 2d painting, and the picture is crowded with people, except the Madonna has space. There is a red behind the background and the angels have halos. The figures are small relative to the amount of space given for the piece. It is made on gold panels with engravings and paint stained on it.
