= Madonna and Child with Saints Peter and Paul =

Painting by Pietro Perugino

Madonna and Child with St Peter and St Paul
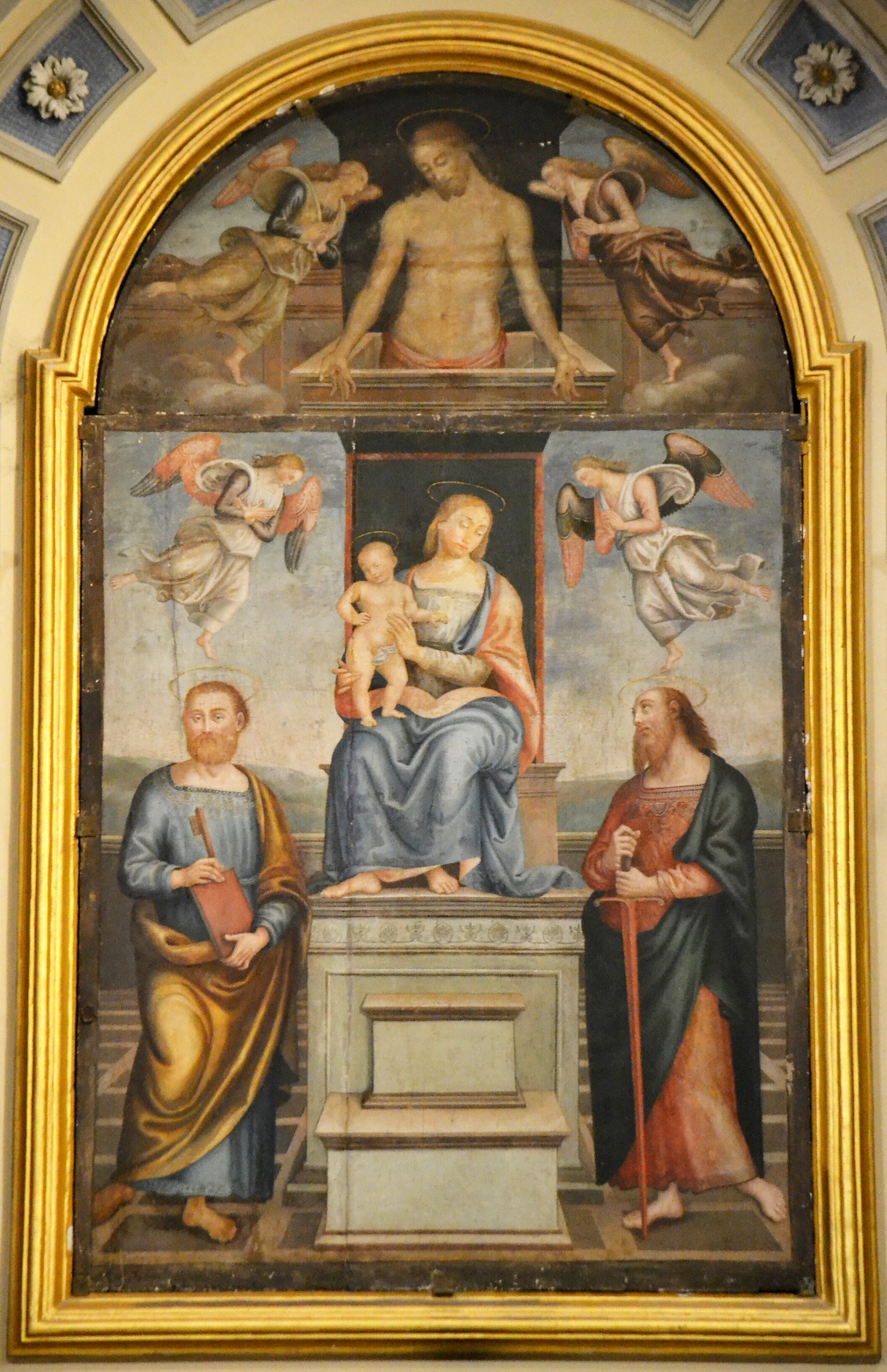
- Artist: Perugino or his studio
- Year: c. 1515
- Medium: tempera on panel
- Dimensions: 290 cm × 170 cm (110 in × 67 in)
- Location: Collegiata dei santi San Pietro e Paolo, Monteleone d'Orvieto

Madonna and Child with St Peter and St Paul is a c. 1515 painting by Perugino or his studio, held in the Collegiata dei santi San Pietro e Paolo in Monteleone d'Orvieto. It shows the Madonna and Child between St Peter and Paul of Tarsus, with a semi-circular cymatium showing the Resurrection.

It was seen in the apse of the Collegiata in 1872 by Mariano Guardabassi, who attributed it to Pietro Vannucci. In 1923 Umberto Gnoli reattributed it to Giacomo di Ser Guglielmo of Città della Pieve - according to Gnoli this painter had collaborated on all the works Perugino painted in his birthplace after 1510. He argued that the "large square forms, especially in the faces" were typical of Ser Giacomo, as were the thick and stocky figures and the red hairs still visible in Deposition (Santa Maria dei Servi church, Città della Pieve), in Madonna in glory with four saints (Duomo di Città della Pieve) and in the fresco of Antony the Great. These features of works produced in Città delle Pieve by Perugino and his studio are not found in the Monteleone d'Orvieto altarpiece, attributed to Ser Giacomo by Gnoli, but he argues that this is only because they were made illegible by repainting during its 1938 restoration. Fernando Cogna instead argues that the underdrawing was by Perugino and that the painting was by his pupil Ser Guglielmo de Castel della Pieve.

== Bibliography (in Italian) ==
- Vittoria Garibaldi, Perugino, in Pittori del Rinascimento, Scala, Florence, 2004 ISBN 888117099X
- Pierluigi De Vecchi, Elda Cerchiari, I tempi dell'arte, volume 2, Bompiani, Milan, 1999. ISBN 88-451-7212-0
- Stefano Zuffi, Il Quattrocento, Electa, Milan, 2004. ISBN 8837023154
