= Virgin and Child with Saints and Donors =

Painting by Cima da Conegliano and his workshop

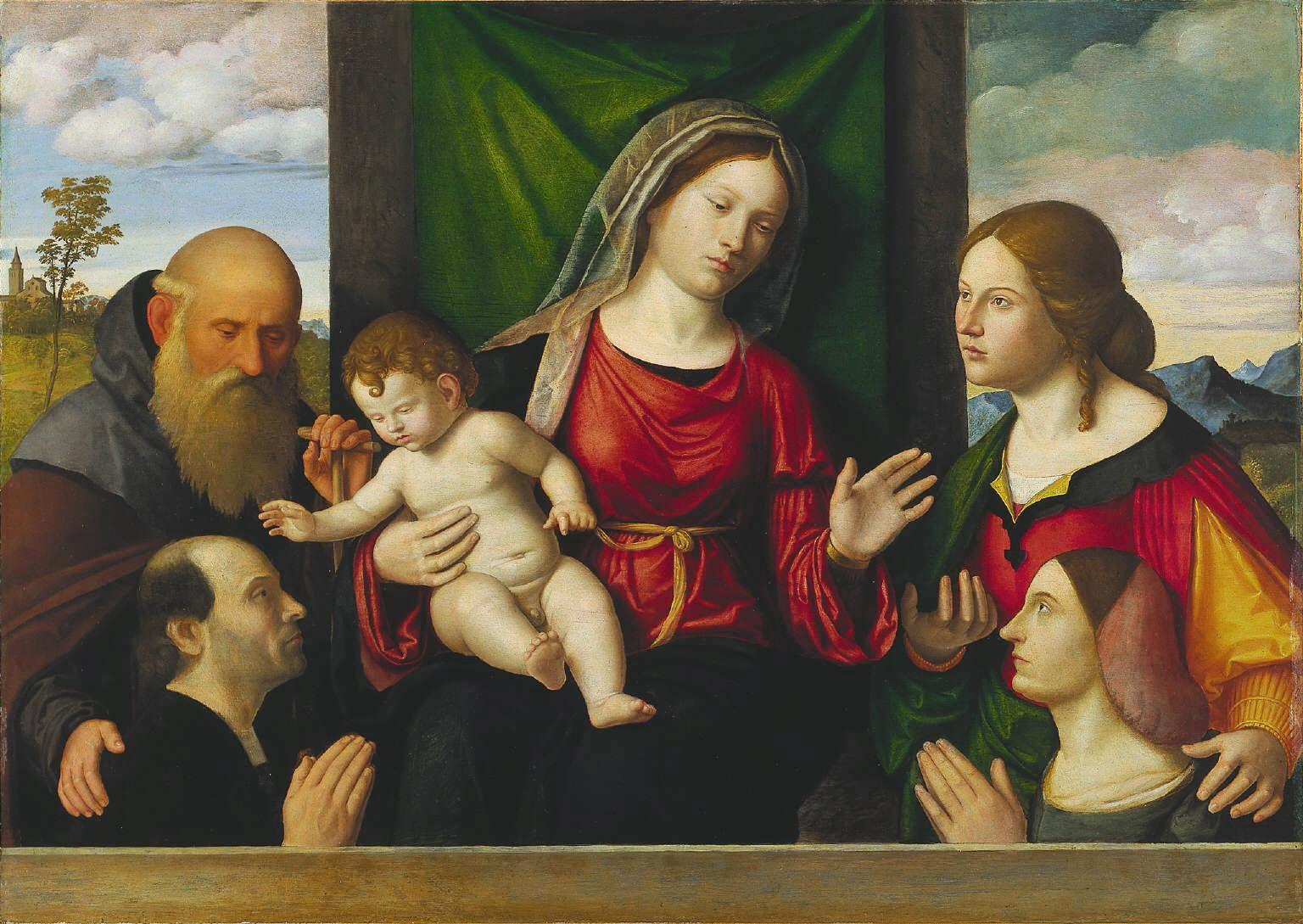
Madonna and Child with Saints (1515) by Cima da Conegliano

Madonna and Child with Saints is a 1515 oil on panel painting by Cima da Conegliano, now in the Cleveland Museum of Art, Ohio.

== Description ==
At the bottom left and right it portrays the married couple who probably commissioned it for private devotion. The husband may have been named Antonio, since the saint presenting him is Anthony the Great. The work seems to have been left incomplete - the saint on the right (Lucy or Mary Magdalene) hold out her right hand but does not hold an attribute.
