= Madonna and Child with Saints Herculanus and Constantius =

Painting by Pietro Perugino

Madonna of the Kitchen or Madonna and Child with St Herculanus and St Constantius
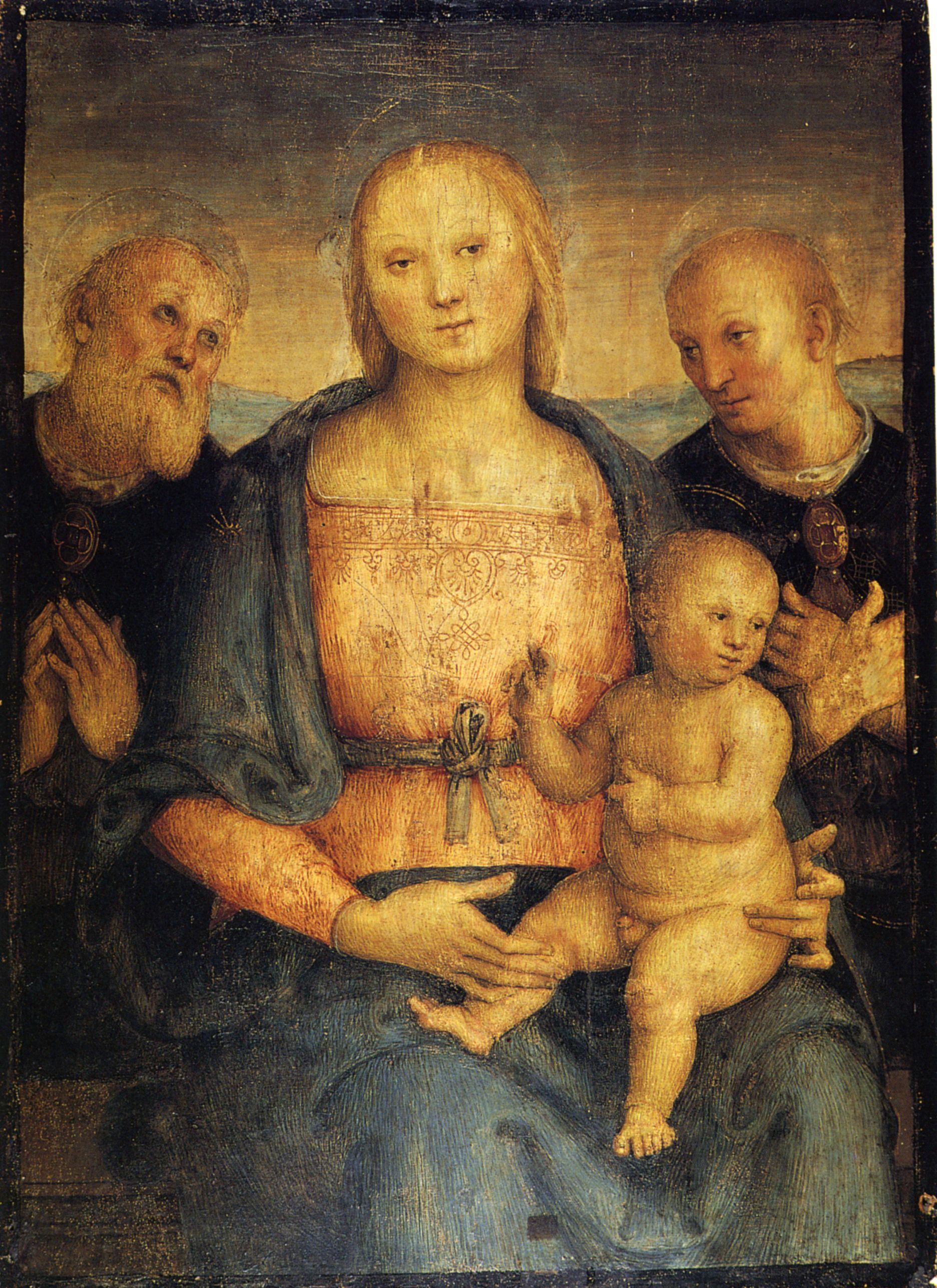
- Artist: Perugino
- Year: 1515
- Medium: oil on canvas
- Dimensions: 79 cm × 56 cm (31 in × 22 in)
- Location: Galleria Nazionale dell'Umbria, Perugia

Madonna and Child with St Herculanus and St Constantius or Madonna of the Kitchen is a 1515 painting by Perugino, now in the Galleria Nazionale dell'Umbria in Perugia. Its title refers to the fact that it once hung in the former kitchen of the Palazzo dei Priori in Perugia. The two accompanying saints are Herculanus and Constantius, both local saints to Perugia.

It restored in the 20th century, recovering its original colours. Bombe, Adolfo Venturi, F. Canuti, Domenico Gnoli and Berenson had previously held it to be studio work, but after the restoration decided it was an autograph work with studio assistance. Santi and Cavalcaselle consider the work's attribution to Perugino to be doubtful and argue it was an autograph work subjected to major alterations by assistants at a late stage in its production.

== Bibliography ==
- (in Italian) Vittoria Garibaldi, Perugino, in Pittori del Rinascimento, Scala, Florence, 2004 ISBN 88-8117-099-X
- (in Italian) Pierluigi De Vecchi, Elda Cerchiari, I tempi dell'arte, volume 2, Bompiani, Milan, 1999 ISBN 88-451-7212-0
- (in Italian) Stefano Zuffi, Il Quattrocento, Electa, Milan, 2004 ISBN 88-370-2315-4
- (in Italian) Entry on Frammentiarte.it
