= The Madonna Enthroned =

1497 triptych panel by Master Martin

- Madona so sv. Katarínou a sv. Alžbetou (Slovak)
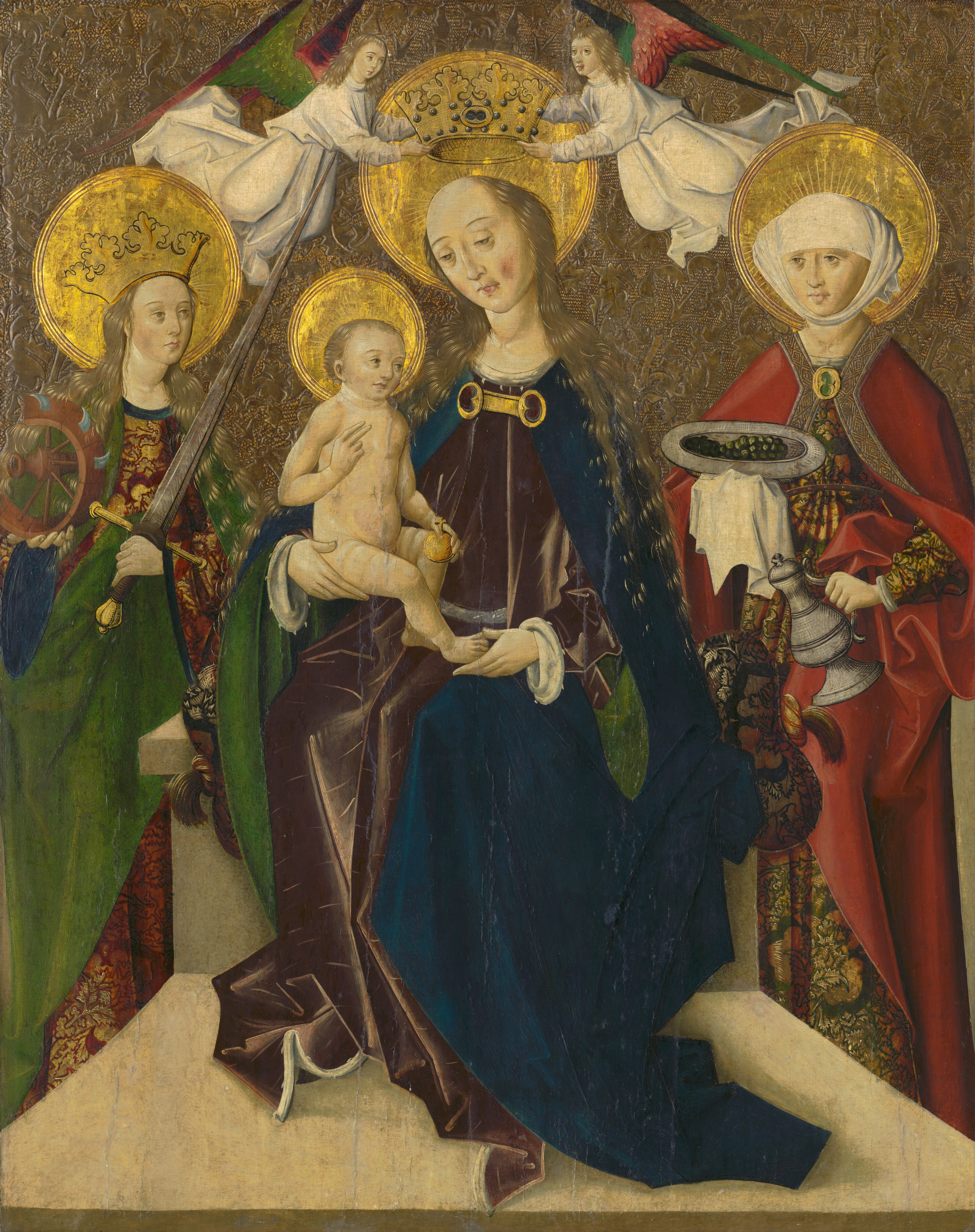
- Artist: Master Martin
- Year: 1497
- Type: tempera on panel with gilding
- Dimensions: 144 cm × 115 cm (57 in × 45 in)
- Location: Slovak National Gallery, Bratislava

Madonna Enthroned between St. Catherine and St. Elizabeth of Hungary (Slovak: Madona so sv. Katarínou a sv. Alžbetou) is an icon, a central part of the side altar of the Church of the Nativity of the Virgin Mary in Jánovciach. The author of the original triptych, Master Martin, signed his name on the back of the icon, from 1497. The signature on the back of the board reads: Martin(us) 1497 Pictor in Vigilia Nativity (is). The patron of the icon is unknown.

== Description ==
The tempera on panel with gilding of Jánoviec shows Mitre Martin several times repeated the theme "Madonna Enthroned" between the two saints. The central part of the altarpiece dominates the Coronation of the Virgin Mary with Jesus, above which hover two angels crowning the Virgin Mary. The left saint is St. Catherine of Alexandria and the right in Martin's paintings is St. Elizabeth of Hungary (also known as St. Elizabeth of Thuringia). She was born in Bratislava (1207) as the daughter of Hungarian King Andrew II., But at age 14 she was married to Ludwig IV Landgrave of Thuringia. (1221), that after his death, she became a nun caring for the poor and sick in Marburg in Hesse, where she died at the age of 24 years (1231). She was canonized in 1239. Among the most revered saint in Germany. Her appearance on the icon, "typified" because the same face lent Martin in the early 1490s St. Elizabeth of Hungary (Thuringia) to the intermediate plate altar originating from the St. Helena Arnutovce in a surprisingly similar egg shape with a "swollen" eyelids and chin lent to small and Vol. Catherine of Alexandria on the same altar church board. Gala Turany, Martin painted by the master at the end of the 15th century. Master on the altar, however, the board of Jánoviec lent a somewhat modified form St. Catherine of Alexandria, whose symbol is a broken wheel. On the icon, however, she dominated in her hands a sword who was beheaded.

== Icon history ==
The middle panel of the altar triptych from the Church of the Nativity of the Virgin Mary in Jánovciach the late 17th century was replaced by a new altar. Furthermore, it served as a side altar in the same church. In 1934, it was purchased by the Slovak homeland museum in Bratislava. In 1957, it was transferred to the collections of the Slovak National Gallery, taking over from the painter Peter Kern from Liptovsky Mikulas.

== Analysis ==
In the Spisska Chapterhouse in the 80 years of the 15th century, a figure painter, author of the altar in Spišské Podhradí, which was based on solid modeling character and of a desire for their characterization up to their ambitious individualization. The place of his workshop was Spisska Chapterhouse, where his influence spread thanks to his pupils. Among them was even Master Martin, who was trained in the workshop of Master John in the 1470s. In the 1480s, he began working independently, but even then his panel paintings disappeared similarities typing female face, hair painting and iconographic content of the paintings corresponding to the formation of his teacher. Also, draping the characters are sharply angled, decreasing the fringes characteristic shapes with sharp edges. On the basis of the characteristics of creative Master Martin and his workshop attributed to a number of works. Besides the Jánoviec panel is mainly the Triptych of the Virgin Mary in Arnutovciach or the altar of St. Catherine in the church, of Gala Turany. Potential patrons of these altars and altar panels were probably the Zapolsky family. At the end of the 15th century, however, the center of gravity of the late Gothic painting moved from Spišská chapter in Levoca, so here culminated in the works of Master Paul of Levoca.

== Exhibitions ==
The altar slab of Jánoviec was presented at the Great Exhibition in Prague in 1938, and a year after the restoration workshop Bohuslav Slansky. After its takeover by Peter Kern from Liptovský Nicholas was in October 1975 in the premises of the Zvolen Castle in the exhibition "Gothic Art in Slovakia", organized by the Slovak National Gallery, in whose exhibition "Gothic" is "The board of Jánoviec" exposed in the present.
