= Virgin and Child Between Saints Anthony of Padua and Roch =

Painting by Titian

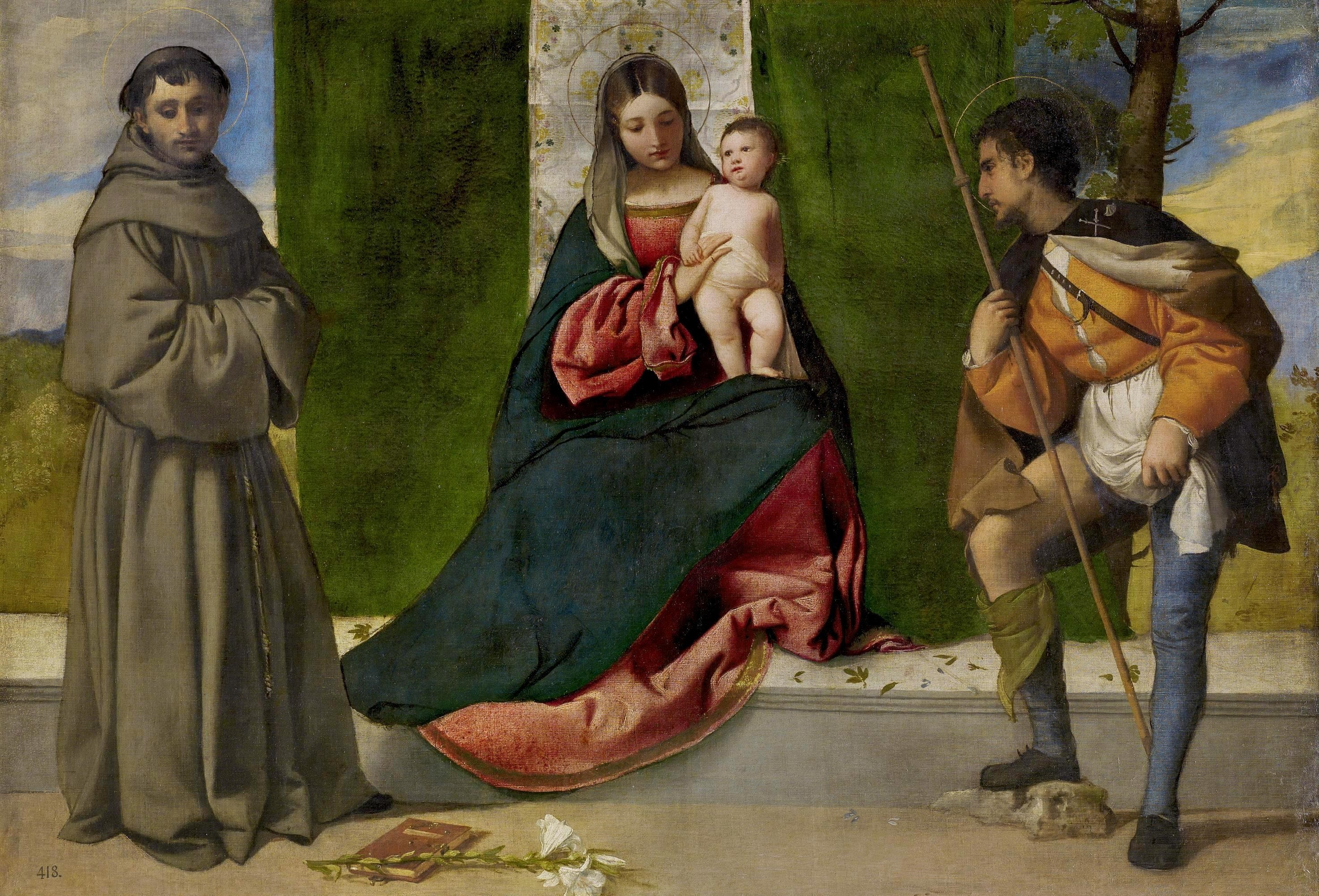
- Artist: Titian
- Year: c. 1510
- Medium: Oil on canvas
- Dimensions: 92 cm × 133 cm (36 in × 52 in)
- Location: Museo del Prado, Madrid

The Virgin and Child Between Saints Anthony of Padua and Roch is an oil on canvas painting by Titian, from c. 1510. It was originally given to Philip IV of Spain by his Viceroy of Naples, Ramiro Núñez de Guzmán, and is now held in the Museo del Prado, in Madrid.

== Description ==
Against the backdrop of a green curtain, where a drape with gold embroidery is placed, is depicted the throne of the Virgin and Child, in similar style to Giovanni Bellini. On both sides, and in front of landscape openings, there are the Saints Anthony of Padua and Roch. The presence of both saints is most likely related to a Paduan commission after the plague of 1511, when Titian was in the Venetian city to paint the frescoes of the Scuola del Santo. Roch is in fact the protector during epidemics and his position, with his leg resting on a stone, is precisely studied to show the wound that he traditionally has in his leg. The figure of Anthony is more composed, with the traditional attributes of the book and the white lily on the ground.

The intense chromaticism, inspired by the principles of tonalism, creates large fields of color, which give expressive vigor to the figures.

In 1657 it was recorded in the sacristy of the Escorial Monastery, where it was misattributed to "Bordonon", perhaps a misspelling of Paris Bordone. Later reattributed to Giorgione, Pordenone and then Francesco Vecellio, it was finally returned to its correct attribution by most critics due to its composition and symmetry.

== See also ==
- List of works by Titian
