= Madonna and Child with Saints (Cima, Nivå) =

Painting by Cima da Conegliano

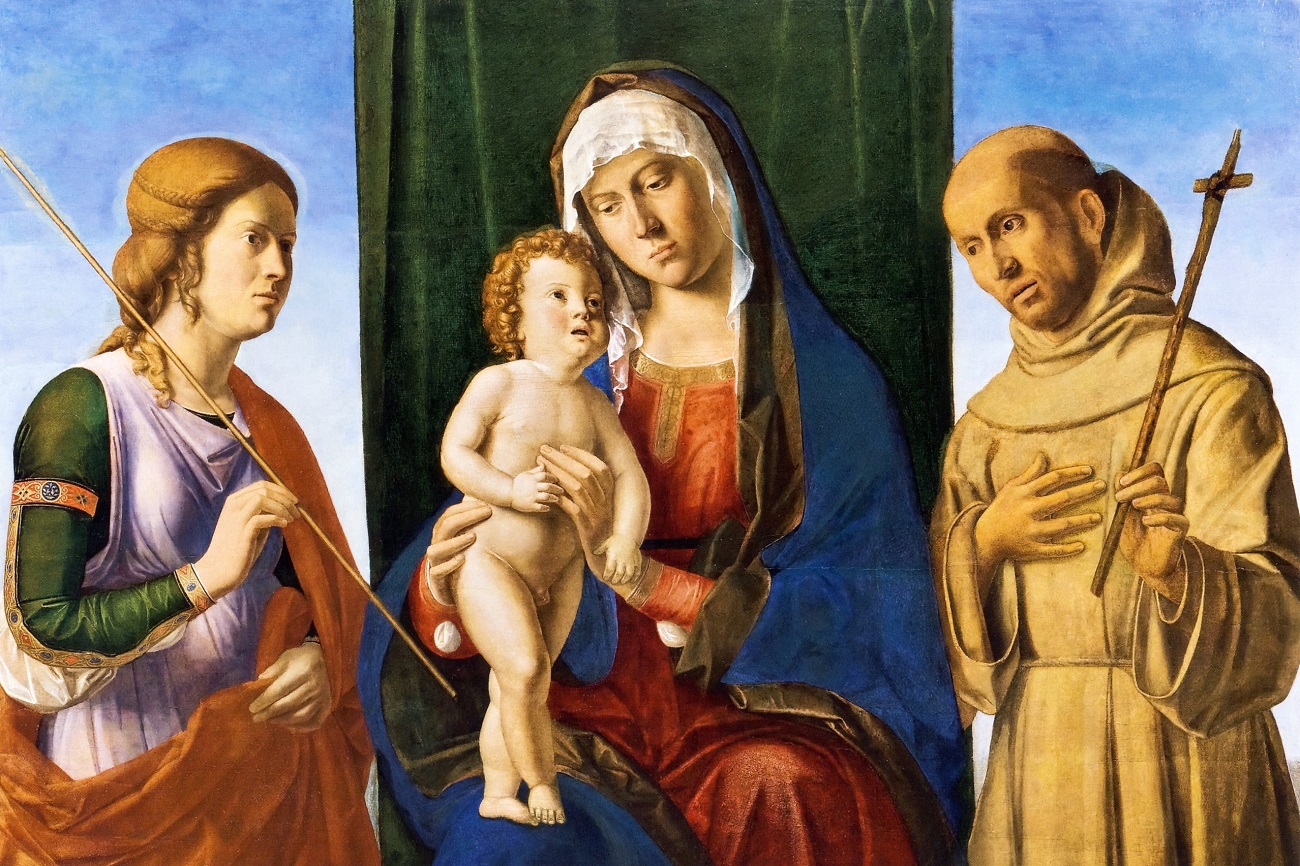
Madonna and Child with Saints by Cima da Conegliano

Madonna and Child with Saints is an undated oil-on-panel painting by the Italian Renaissance artist Cima da Conegliano, now in the Nivaagaards Malerisamling in Nivå, Denmark. Its dimensions are 71.5 cm x 102.5 cm (28.1 in. x 40.3 in.). Its small size means it was probably a devotional image for a private house.
