= Madonna and Child with Saints (Fogg Art Museum) =

1515 painting attributed to an artist in the circle of Giovanni Bellini

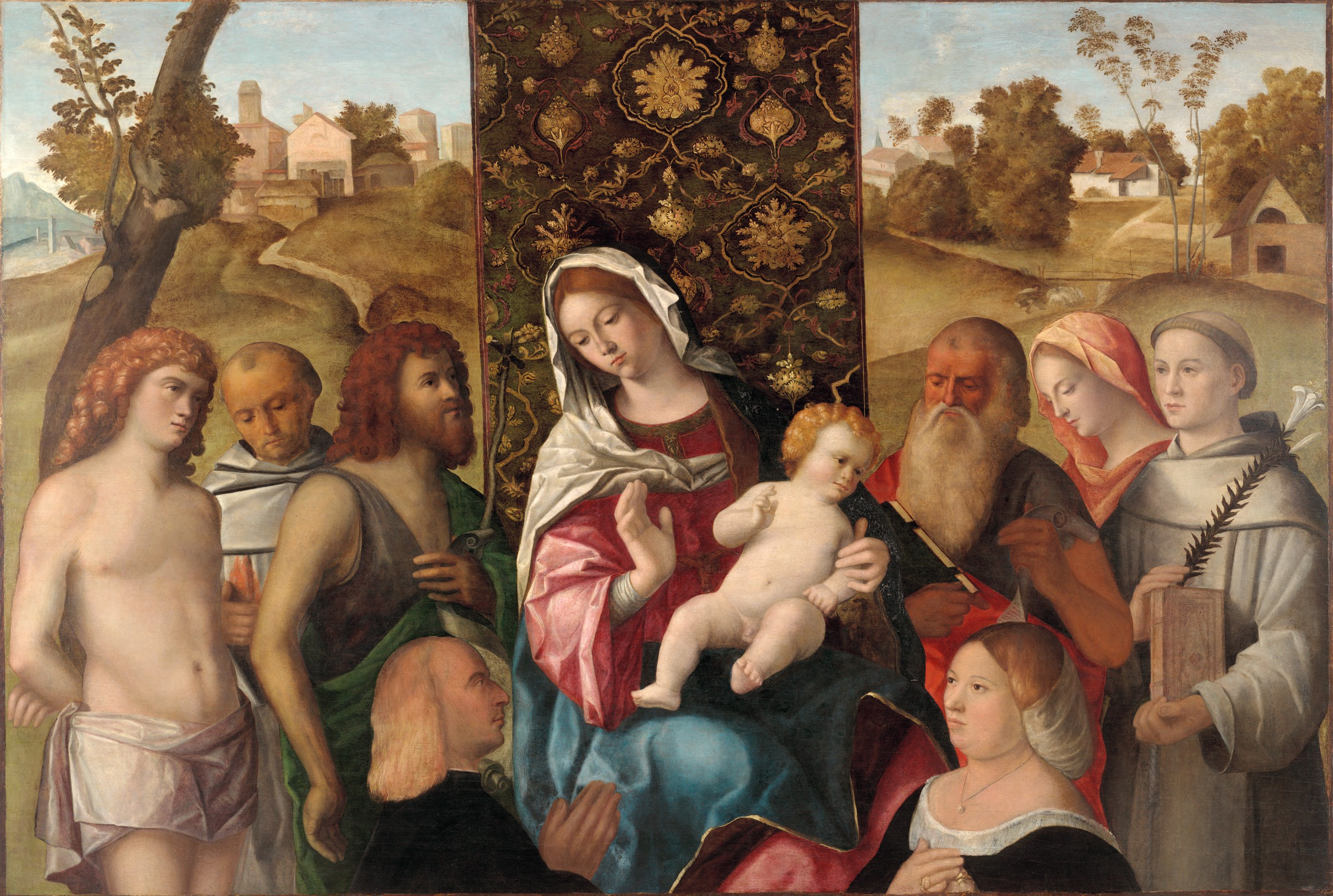
Madonna and Child with Saints (1515) by Cima da Conegliano

Madonna and Child with Saints is a 1515 oil on canvas painting, now in the Fogg Art Museum in Cambridge (Massachusetts). Previously attributed to Cima da Conegliano, it is now attributed to an artist in the circle of Giovanni Bellini.

It shows its husband and wife donors at bottom centre (the husband possibly painted posthumously), with the accompanying saints in two groups of three - on the left Sebastian, Francis of Assisi and John the Baptist and on the right Jerome, an unidentified female saint and Anthony of Padua.
