= Madonna and Child with Four Saints (Titian) =

Painting by Titian

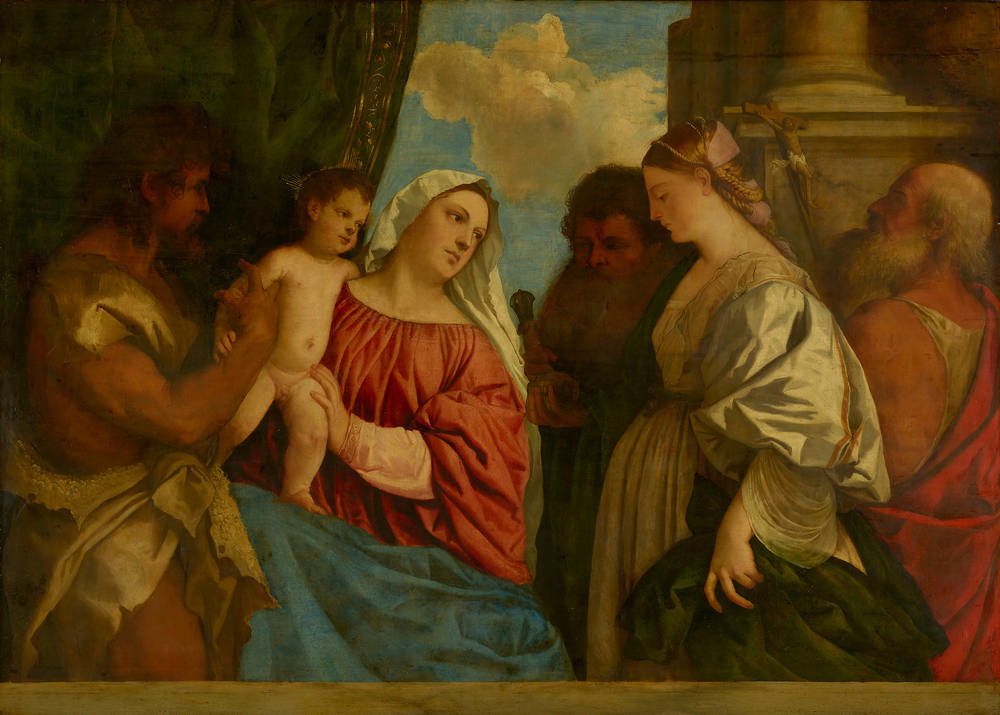
- Artist: Titian
- Year: c. 1515-1518
- Medium: Oil on panel
- Dimensions: 139 cm × 191 cm (55 in × 75 in)
- Location: Gemäldegalerie, Dresden

Madonna and Child with Four Saints or Madonna and Child with Saints John the Baptist, Paul, Mary Magdalene and Jerome is a c. 1516-1520 oil on panel painting by Titian, now in the Gemäldegalerie in Dresden. It belongs to the sacra conversazione genre and features saints John the Baptist, Paul, Mary Magdalene and Jerome.

== History ==
In the past it has been attributed to several artists. Morelli was the first to assign it to Titian, as have most later art historians. No documents survive to assist in its dating, which is solely based on stylistic comparison to the free composition and rich colours of Titian's Assumption.

It was probably in cardinal Domenico Grimani's collection in Venice before moving to Santa Maria dei Servi church in Venice, then to Este family collection. In 1745 most of the Este collection was bought by the Duke of Saxony, bringing it to its present home.

== Description ==
The current painting is part of a series depicting the Madonna and Child among saints, painted by Titian in the 1510s and 1520s, and intended primarily for private devotion.

A parted curtain, an architectural detail and a bright sky form the backdrop for the characters, who are depicted at half-length. In the centre, the seated Virgin holds the Child on one knee, while John the Baptist, on the left, is about to pick him up; however, the mother and child are turned to the right. Mary Magdalene here is in a prominent position, in profile and with her face lowered, while Saint Paul emerges from the shadows and behind her is Saint Jerome adoring the crucifix. The arrangement of the protagonists is extremely free, in the spirit of a variety of attitudes and expressions that was the basis of the "modern style" then in vogue.

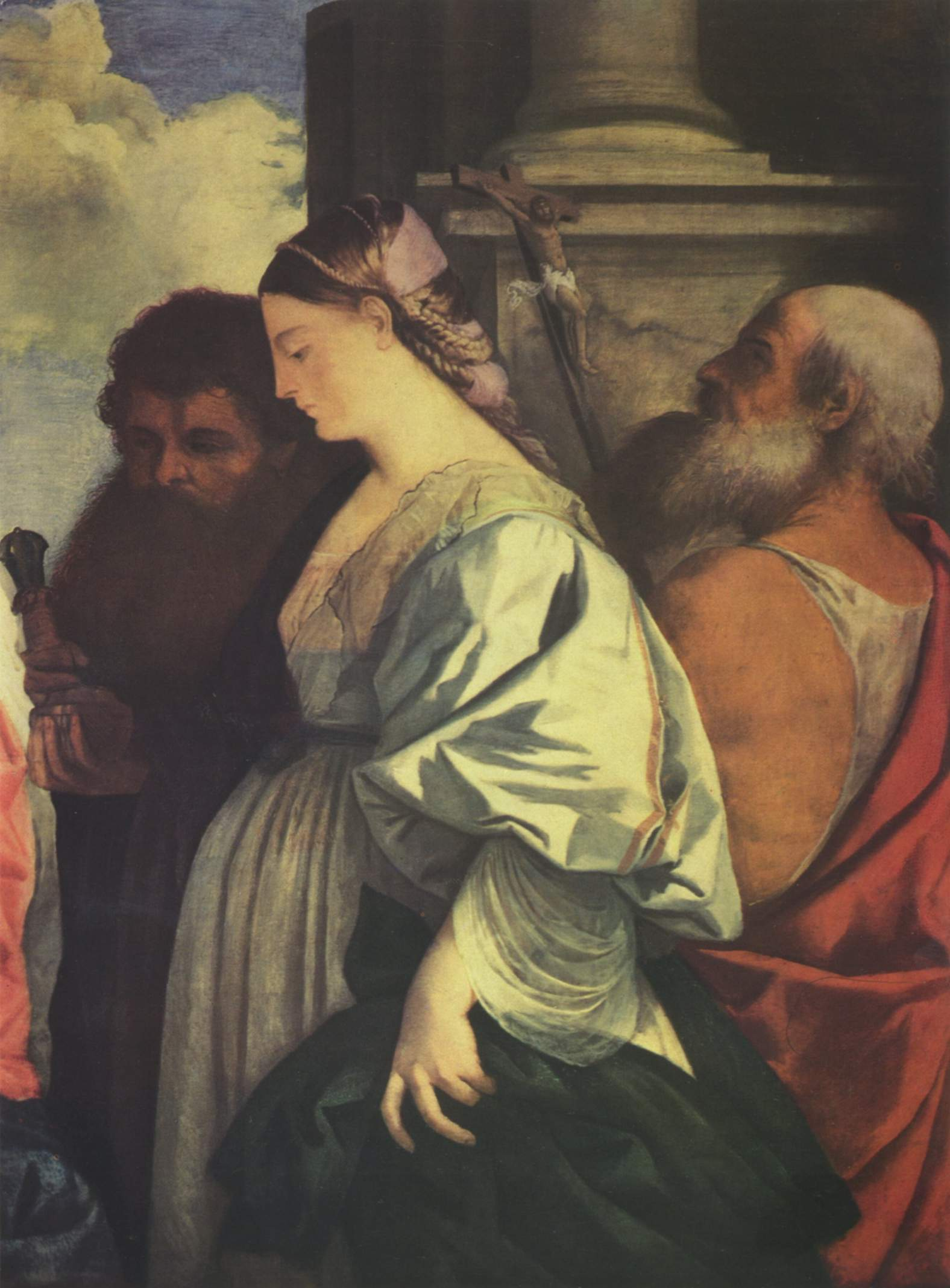
Detail

== See also ==
- List of works by Titian
