= Madonna and Child Enthroned with Two Virgin Martyrs =

Painting by Cima da Conegliano

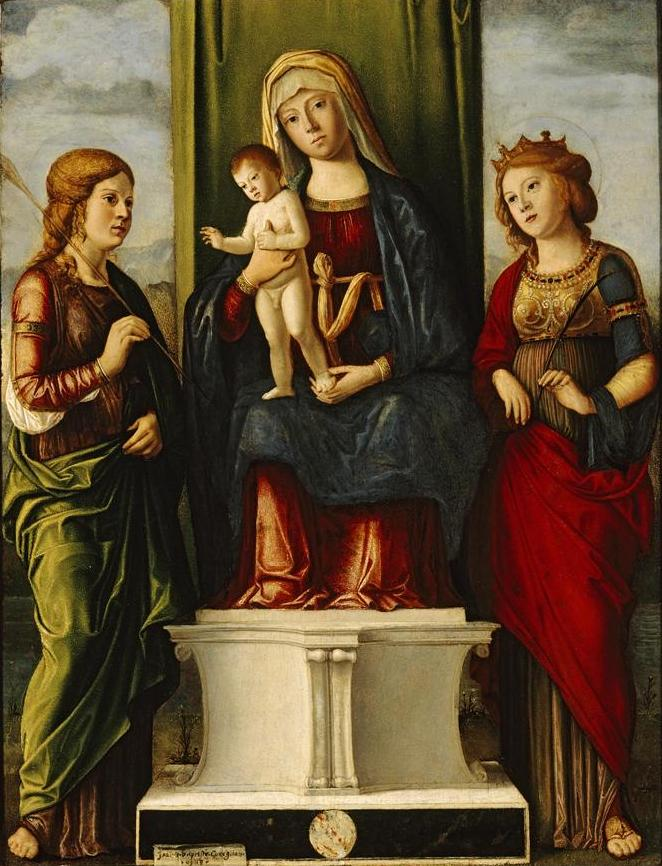
Madonna and Child Enthroned with Two Virgin Martyrs (1495) by Cima da Conegliano

Madonna and Child Enthroned with Two Virgin Martyrs is an oil on panel painting by Cima da Conegliano, created in 1495, now in the Memphis Brooks Museum of Art.
