= Madonna and Child with Saints John the Evangelist and Augustine =

Painting by Pietro Perugino

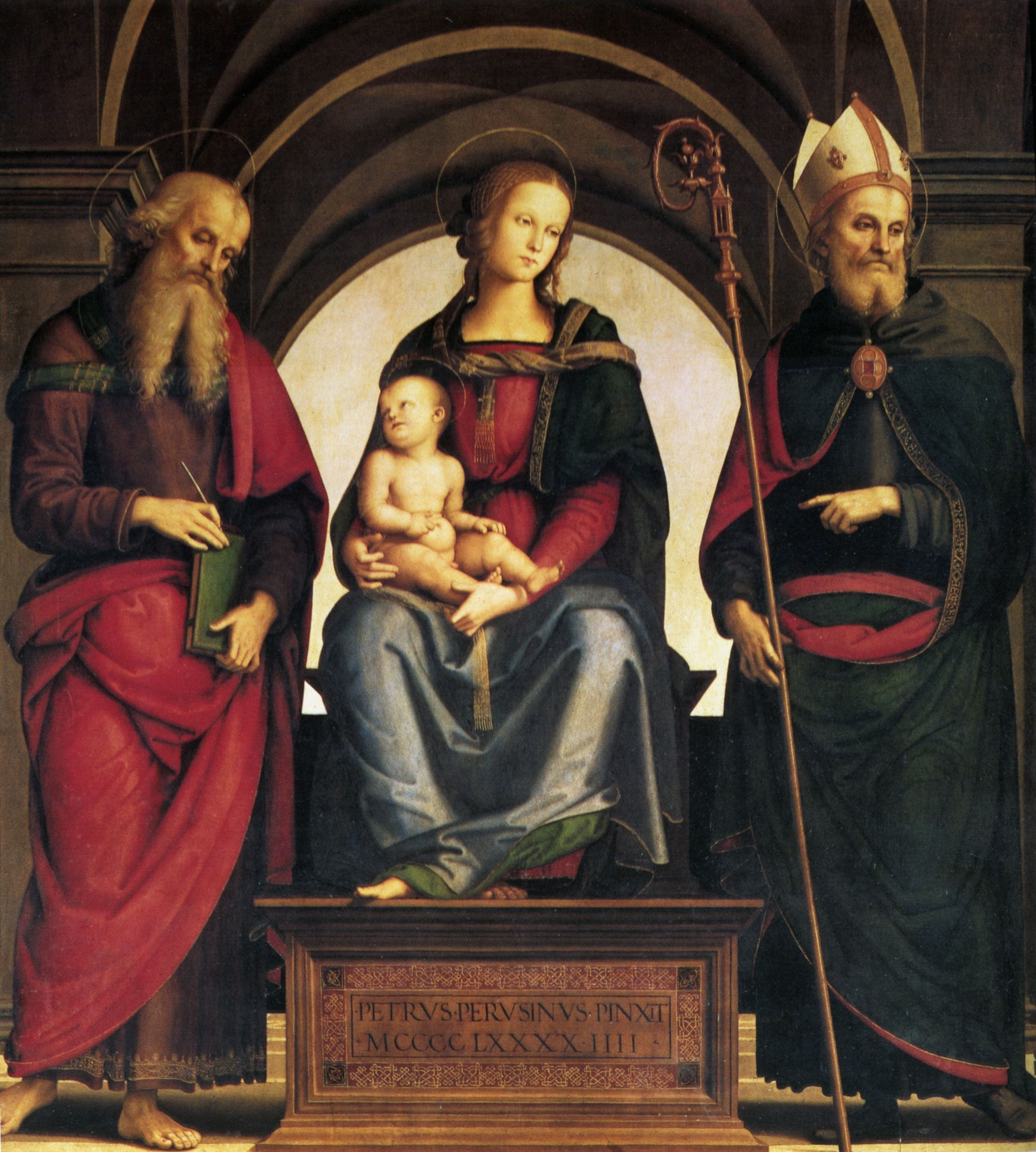
- Artist: Pietro Perugino
- Year: 1494
- Medium: Tempera on canvas
- Location: Sant'Agostino, Cremona

The Madonna and Child with Saints John the Evangelist and Augustine is a painting of c. 1494 by Pietro Perugino depicting the Madonna and Child enthroned between Saints John the Evangelist and Augustine of Hippo. It is in the church of Sant'Agostino in Cremona. It was commissioned in 1493 by the wealthy Roncadelli family, and the following year Perugino painted it at his studio in Florence before shipping it to Cremona. It is signed and dated on the throne PETRVS PERVSINVS PINXIT MCCCCLXXXXIIII ('Pietro Perugino painted [this] 1494').

The painting was taken to France by the occupying forces after the Treaty of Tolentino in 1797 and returned in 1815. However, it was not put back in its original position on a side altar on the north side of the nave but on another side altar on the south side of the nave. It was restored in 1999.

== Bibliography (in Italian) ==
- Vittoria Garibaldi, Perugino, in Pittori del Rinascimento, Scala, Florence, 2004 ISBN 888117099X
- Pierluigi De Vecchi, Elda Cerchiari, I tempi dell'arte, volume 2, Bompiani, Milan, 1999. ISBN 88-451-7212-0
- Stefano Zuffi, Il Quattrocento, Electa, Milan, 2004. ISBN 8837023154
