= Madonna and Child with Saints (Veronese) =

Painting by Paolo Veronese

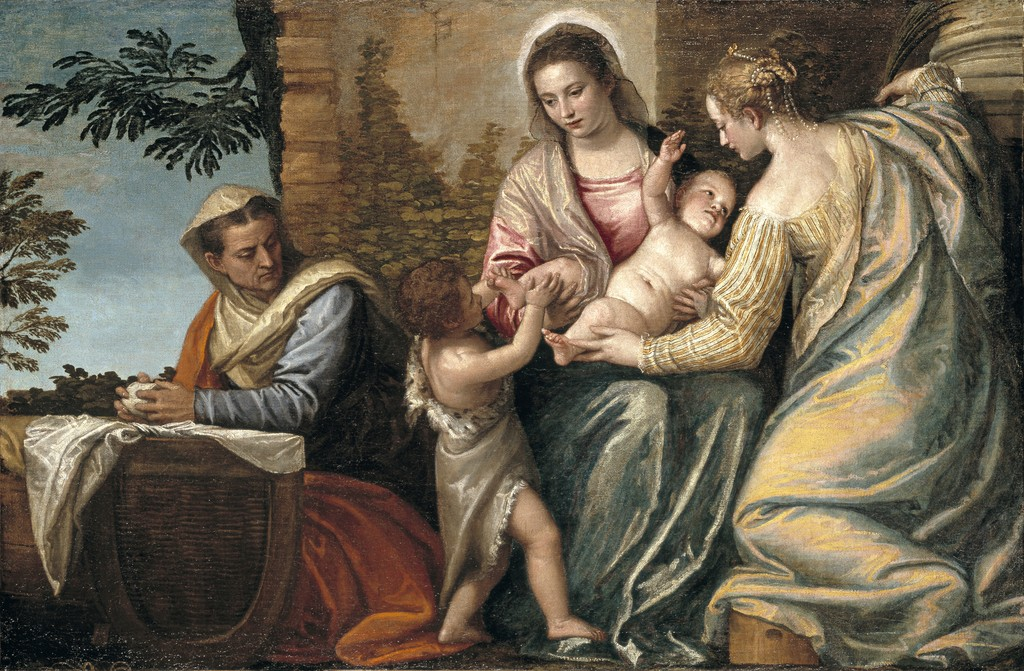
- Artist: Paolo Veronese
- Year: c. 1565-1570
- Medium: Oil on canvas
- Dimensions: 103.8 cm × 158.1 cm (40.9 in × 62.2 in)
- Location: Timken Museum of Art, San Diego

Madonna and Child with Saints or Madonna and Child with Saint Elizabeth, St Catherine and the Infant John the Baptist is an oil painting on canvas painted by the Italian Renaissance painter Paolo Veronese c.1565–1570. It is held in the Timken Museum of Art, in San Diego.

== Description ==
John the Baptist is shown as an infant reaching up to the Virgin Mary and the Christ Child, whilst his mother Elizabeth, with an apprehensive look, kneels by a crib to the left. Catherine of Alexandria at the right reaches up to the Christ Child in a gesture akin to depictions of her Mystic Marriage.

== Provenance ==
The work may have been mentioned in 1648 by Carlo Ridolfi as belonging to the painter's heirs, suggesting it was still in his studio at the time of his death. According to Cicogna, in the 19th century it belonged to Abbot Celotti. It was next owned by Bondon in Paris until 1831. It was afterwards bought by Norman Clark Neill of Cowes in 1925 and later to Mrs H. F. Buxton of London before being acquired by the Putnam Foundation in 1956.
