= Virgin and Child with Saints (attributed to Cima) =

Painting attributed to Cima da Conegliano

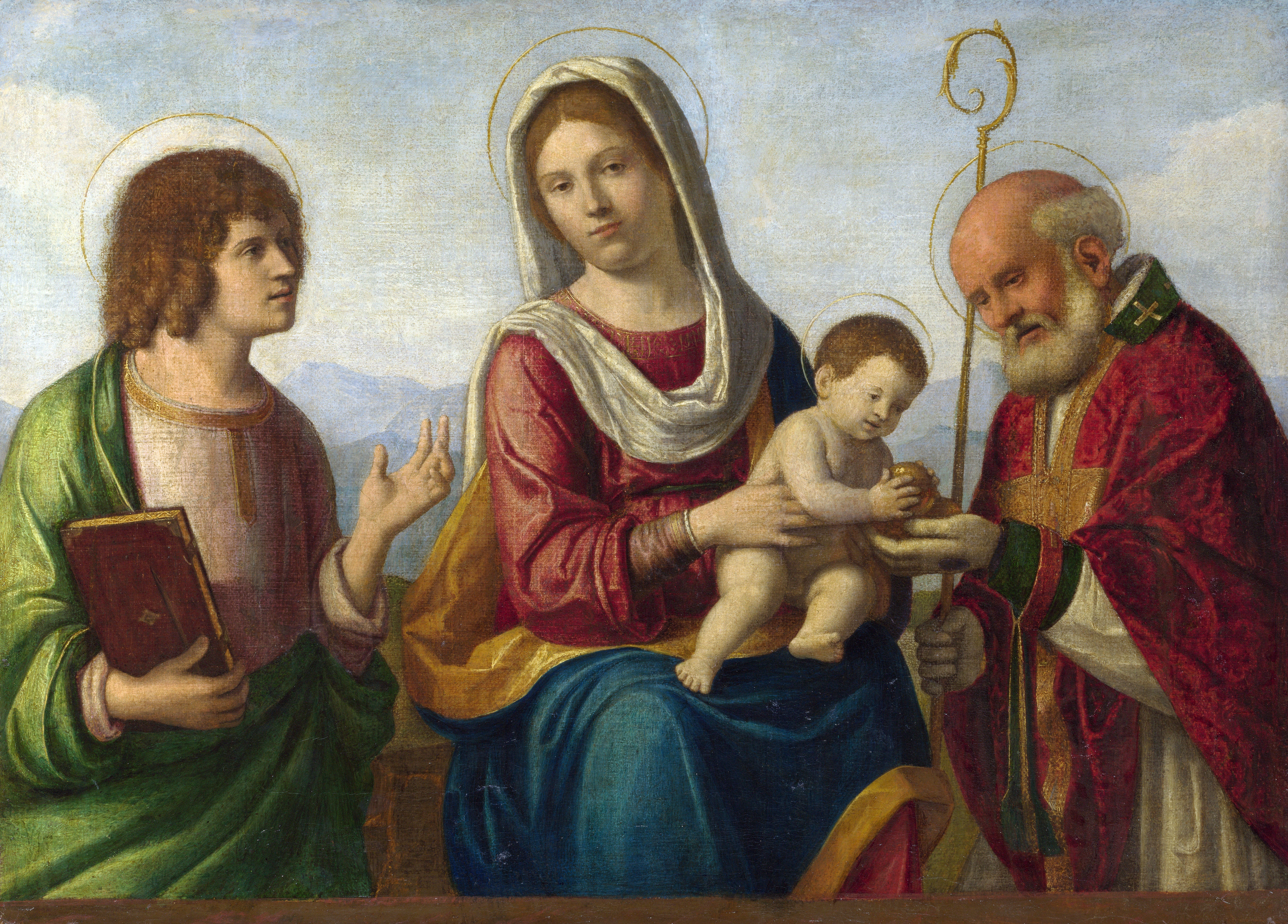
The Virgin and Child with Saints (1513–1518) by Cima da Conegliano

The Virgin and Child with Saints is an oil-on-canvas painting attributed to Cima da Conegliano, created in 1513–1518, now in the National Gallery, London, to which it was bequeathed in 1916.
