= Madonna and Child Enthroned with Saints (Gaddi) =

Painting by Agnolo Gaddi

Enthroned Madonna and Child with Saints
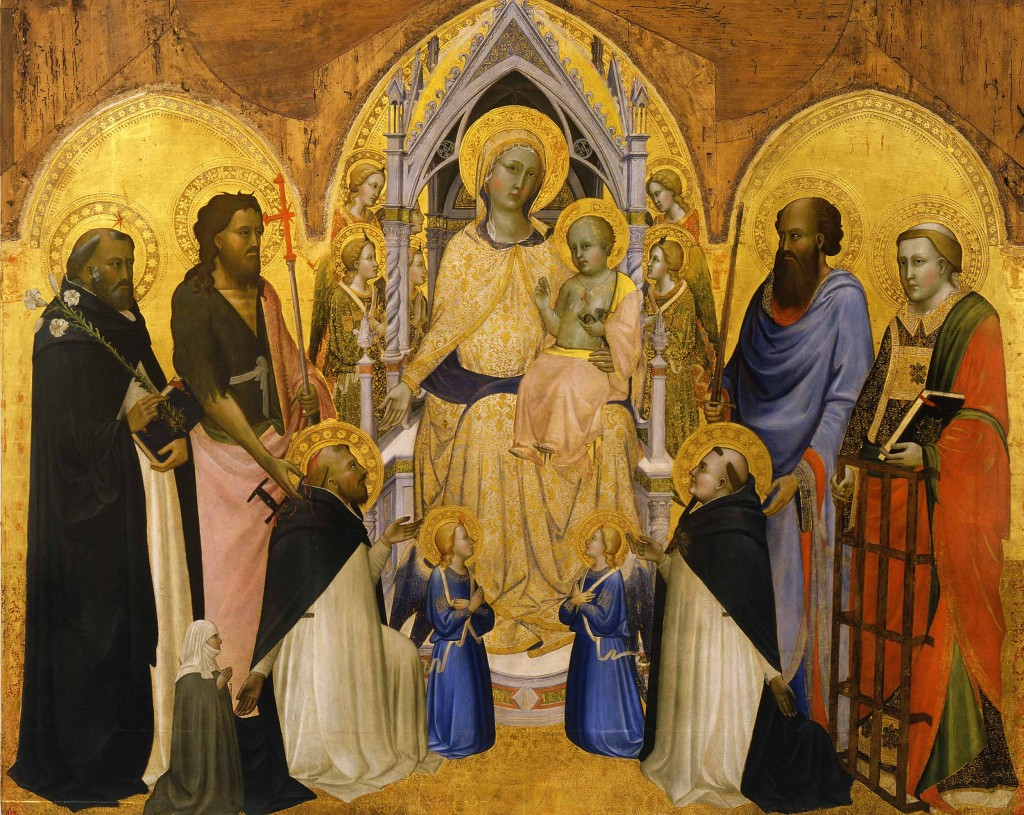
- Artist: Agnolo Gaddi
- Year: c. 1375
- Medium: Tempera
- Dimensions: 159 cm × 198 cm (63 in × 78 in)
- Location: Galleria nazionale di Parma

The Enthroned Madonna and Child with Saints is a triptych painting in tempera and gold leaf on panel (159x198 cm) by Agnolo Gaddi.

It is dated 1375 and preserved in the Galleria nazionale di Parma.

== History ==
The presence of saints of the Dominican Order confirms the origin of the work from the Church of Santa Maria Novella in Florence, according to an inscription on the back of the painting. The same inscription mentions the purchase of the work by Alfonso Tacoli Canacci, an Emilian nobleman who had assembled a rich collection of gold-ground paintings from Tuscan churches, especially Florentine ones. Also in 1786, Tacoli Canacci sold Enthroned Madonna and Child with Saints to Duke Ferdinand I of Parma, hoping to create a gallery to house ancient Tuscan paintings. The polyptych, after a series of ownership transfers, was later acquired by the Academy of Fine Arts of Parma in 1865.

== Description ==
At the centre of the triptych, Madonna can be seen seated on a rich Gothic niche throne, holding the Christ Child in her lap, who grasps a small bird in his left hand. Around the throne, angels are arranged, two of whom are integrated within the structure of the throne itself, helping to suggest a sense of depth. The other figures are positioned on the sides, symmetrically, but not separated into three distinct compartments. On the left, Saint Dominic, Saint John the Baptist, and Saint Peter Martyr can be seen; on the right, Saint Lawrence, Saint Paul, and Saint Thomas Aquinas are seen kneeling. At the lower left, a kneeling nun appears, possibly the donor of the painting. According to Boskovits, the modelling of the faces reflects the artist's early phase, who would later adopt the more refined and sophisticated language of the late Gothic style.

== Sources ==
- Fornari Schianchi, Lucia (2000). Galleria Nazionale di Parma, Catalogo delle opere. Milan: Franco Maria Ricci.
