= Madonna and Child with Saints Francis and Quirinus =

Fragment of a fresco by Correggio

Madonna with child and Saints Quirinus and Francis
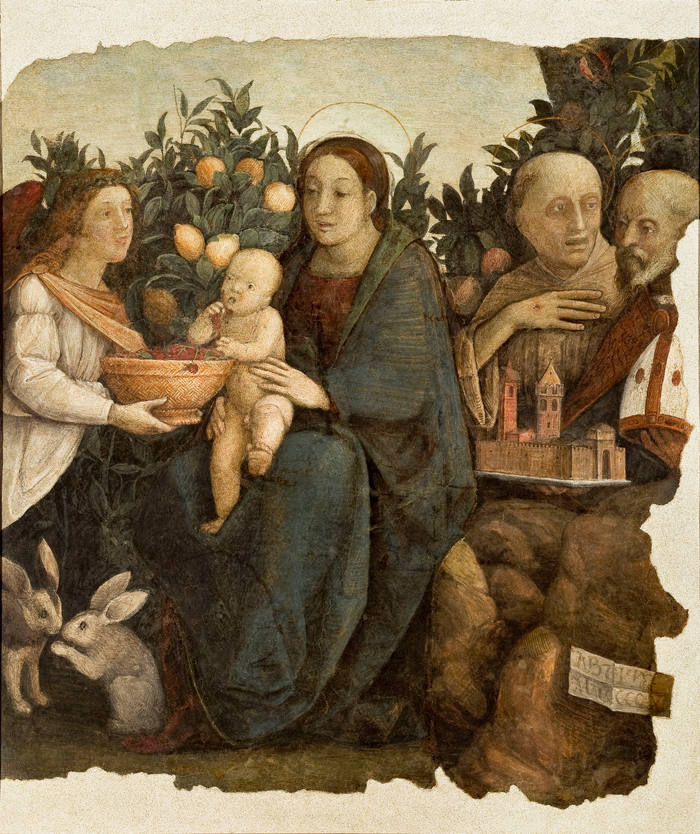
- Year: c. 1505
- Dimensions: 94.5 cm (37.2 in) × 111.5 cm (43.9 in)

Madonna and Child with Saints Francis and Quirinus is a 94.5 by 111.5 cm fragment of a fresco by Correggio, dating to around 1505 and now held in the Galleria Estense in Modena. Ercole III d'Este, Duke of Modena ordered that the fresco be transferred from the church of Santa Maria della Misericordia in Correggio to the Galleria Estense - it was then thought to be a work by Allegri. It was then recorded as having been moved to the church on a fragment of wall from another building - that other building was probably the new collegiata di San Quirino, given the presence of Quirinus of Neuss, holding a mitre and a model of the town of Correggio. It also shows Saint Francis.
