= Madonna and Child with Two Angels, Saint Rose and Saint Catherine =

Painting by Pietro Perugino and Andrea Aloigi

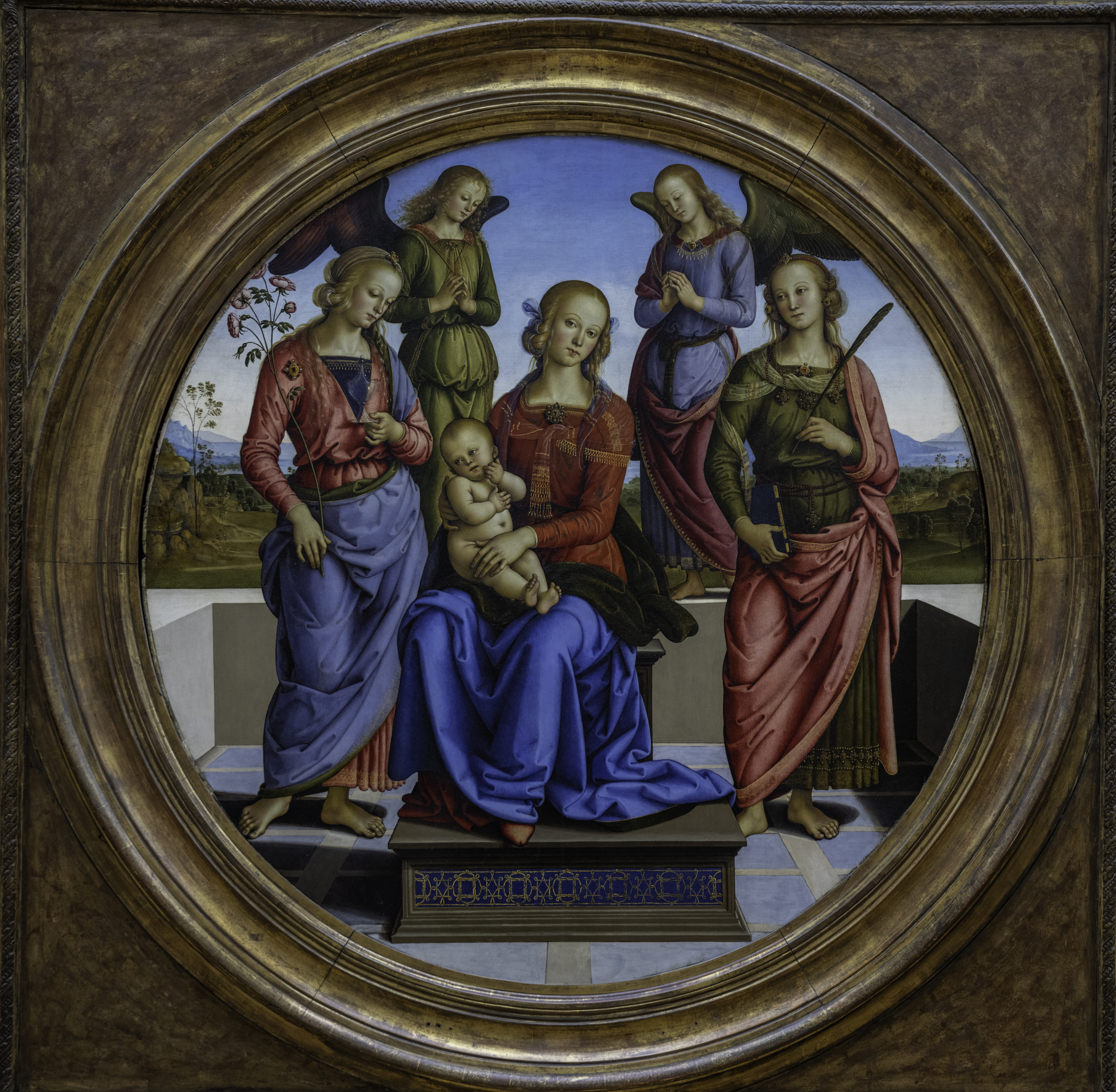
- Artist: Pietro Perugino and Andrea Aloigi
- Year: c. 1490–1492
- Medium: Oil on poplar panel
- Dimensions: 148 cm diameter (58 in)
- Location: Louvre, Paris

The Madonna and Child with Two Angels, Saint Rose and Saint Catherine is an oil painting of c. 1490–1492 in the tondo format by Pietro Perugino and Andrea Aloigi. It shows the Madonna and Child with Saints Rose of Viterbo and Catherine of Alexandria, surrounded by angels. It was sold from the collection of William II of the Netherlands in 1850 to the Louvre in Paris, where it is now on display.
