= Virgin and Child with Saint John the Baptist and an Unidentified Saint =

Painting by Titian

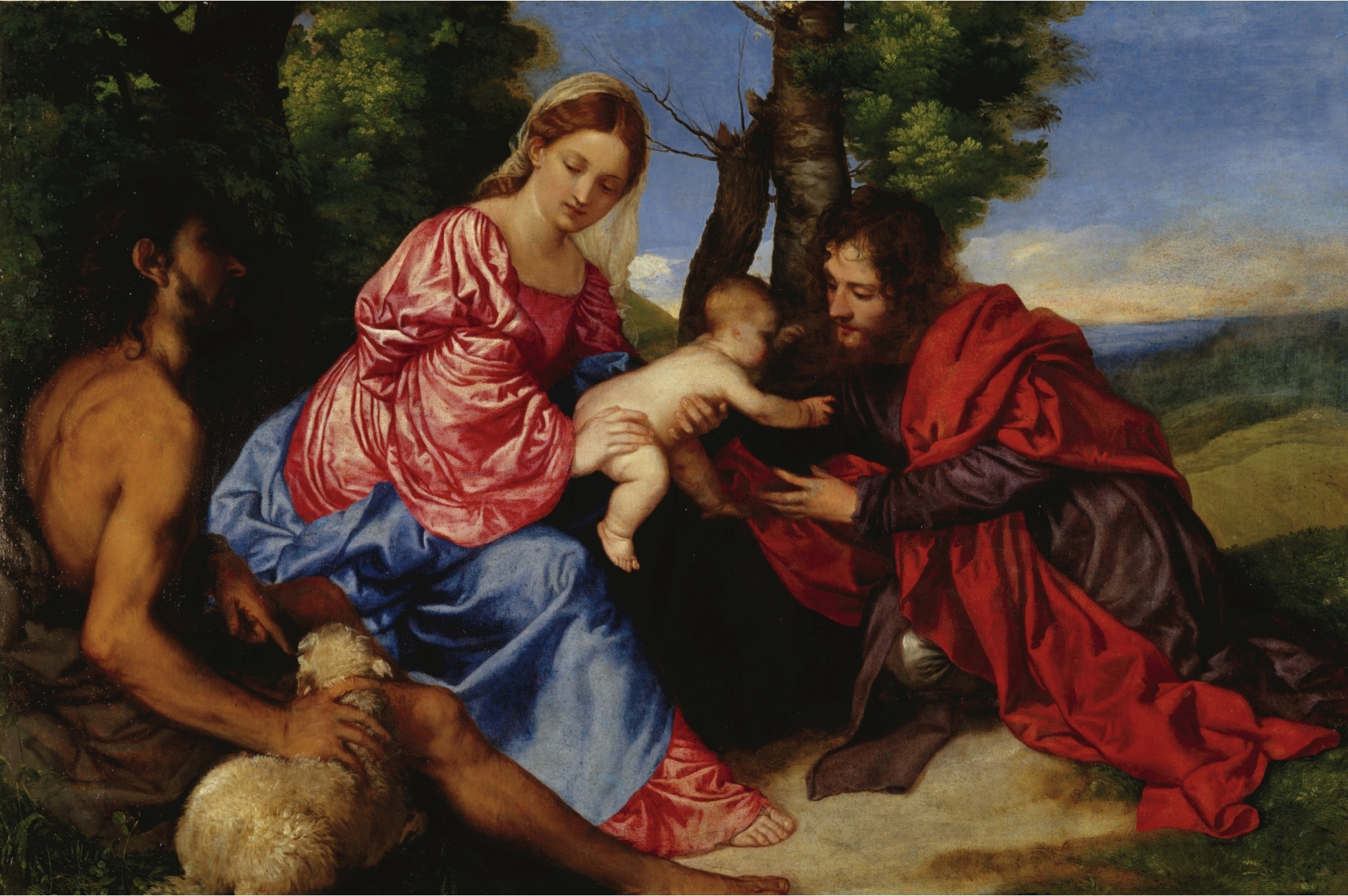
- Artist: Titian
- Year: c. 1515–1520
- Medium: Oil on canvas, from panel
- Dimensions: 62.7 cm × 93 cm (24.7 in × 37 in)
- Location: Scottish National Gallery (on loan); Edinburgh
- Accession: NGL 061.46

The Virgin and Child with Saint John the Baptist and an Unidentified Saint, also called the Virgin with Saint John the Baptist, Adored by a Donor, is a religious painting by Titian, dated to c. 1515-1520. It is currently on loan to the Scottish National Gallery, in Edinburgh.

== Analysis ==
The picture has been called Palmesque, and Crowe and Cavalcaselle give it in their list of pictures ascribed to that painter. Morelli already acknowledged it as a genuine work by Titian in the late nineteenth century. According to Gronau, the picture is also very Giorgionesque, and therefore probably painted about 1510 to 1512, at about the same date as the Three Ages of Life. The Scottish National Gallery puts the date slightly later, about 1515 to 1520. It was originally a panel painting, but has been transferred to canvas.

A replica, with Saint Catherine and Saint Jerome, by a pupil of Titian, is mentioned by Gronau in the Glasgow Corporation Galleries (no. 484) in 1904.

== Description ==
The work is part of a series of sacred conversations in a landscape, dating back more or less to the same years made by Titian. In the Edinburgh canvas too, the pictorial space is divided into two asymmetrical halves, one dominated by shadow and other by an open landscape; in the foreground, the luminous figures of the Virgin and Child stand out, between the two saints arranged around her with relaxed attitudes and who are well-placed in space. On the left, John the Baptist is in a serene contemplation while caressing the Agnus Dei, and on the right, an unidentifiable saint (or a donor) in a bright red and purple dress, which stands out like that of Mary, crossed by shiny flashes, reaches out for the Child Jesus.

The extraordinary chromatic orchestration already foreshadows the masterpieces of the following years, with the viewer's gaze magnetized by the intense reds and blues, including that of the sky.

== Provenance ==
- Earl of Ellesmere, Bridgewater House, Westminster.
- Scottish National Gallery (Bridgewater Collection Loan).

== See also ==
- List of works by Titian

== Sources ==
- Gronau, Georg (1904). Titian. London: Duckworth and Co; New York: Charles Scribner's Sons. p. 281.
- Ricketts, Charles (1910). Titian. London: Methuen & Co. Ltd. pp. 177, plate xx.
- "The Virgin and Child with St John the Baptist and an Unidentified Saint". National Galleries Scotland. Retrieved 7 March 2023.
