= Madonna and Child with Saints (Cima, Berlin) =

Painting by Cima da Conegliano

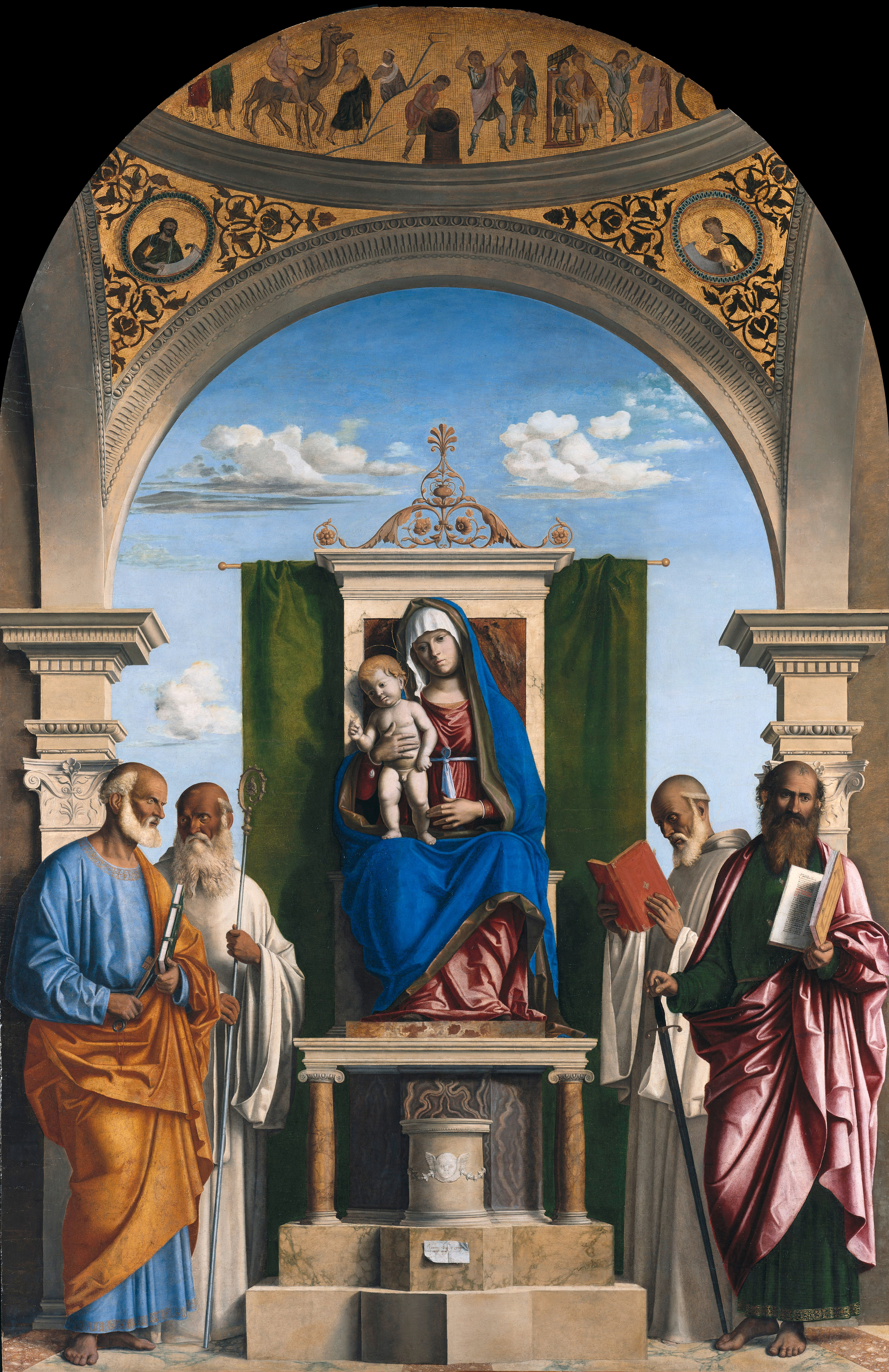
Madonna and Child with Saints (1504) by Cima da Conegliano

Madonna and Child with Saints is an oil on panel painting by Cima da Conegliano, created in 1504, now in the Gemäldegalerie, Berlin. From left to right the accompanying saints are Peter, Romuald, Benedict of Nursia and Paul.
