= Madonna and Child with Saints John the Baptist and Catherine of Alexandria (Cima) =

1515 painting by Cima da Conegliano

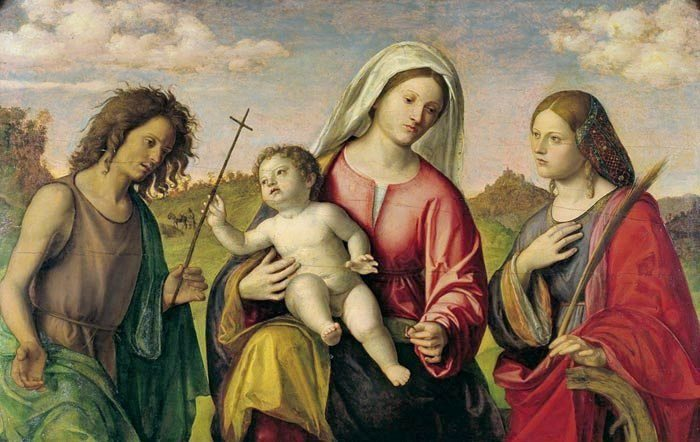
Madonna and Child with Saint John the Baptist and Saint Catherine of Alexandria (1515) by Cima da Conegliano

Madonna and Child with Saint John the Baptist and Saint Catherine of Alexandria is a 1515 oil on canvas painting by Cima da Conegliano, now in the Morgan Library in New York.
