= Madonna and Child with Two Saints (Signorelli) =

c. 1492 painting by Luca Signorelli

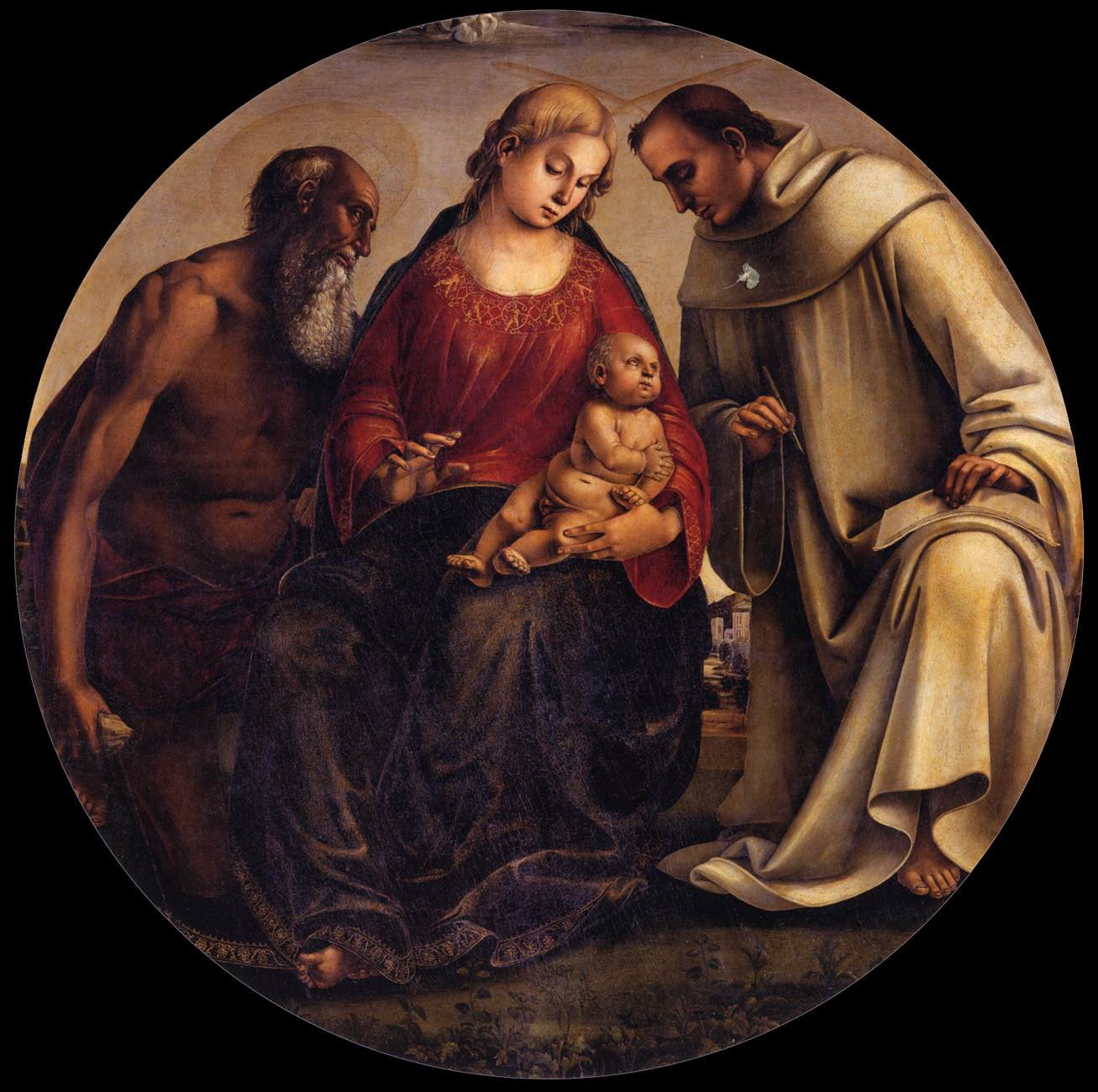
Madonna and Child with Two Saints (c. 1492–1493) by Luca Signorelli

Madonna and Child with Two Saints is a tempera on panel tondo painting by Luca Signorelli, created c. 1492–1493, 112 cm in diameter. It is in the Galleria Corsini of the Palazzo Corsini in Florence, whilst a larger autograph replica known as the Baduel Tondo (c. 1492–1500) is now in the Museo Bandini in Fiesole. To the left is Saint Jerome whilst to the right is Bernard of Clairvaux.
