= Madonna and Child with Saints John the Baptist and Catherine of Alexandria (Previtali) =

Painting by Andrea Previtali

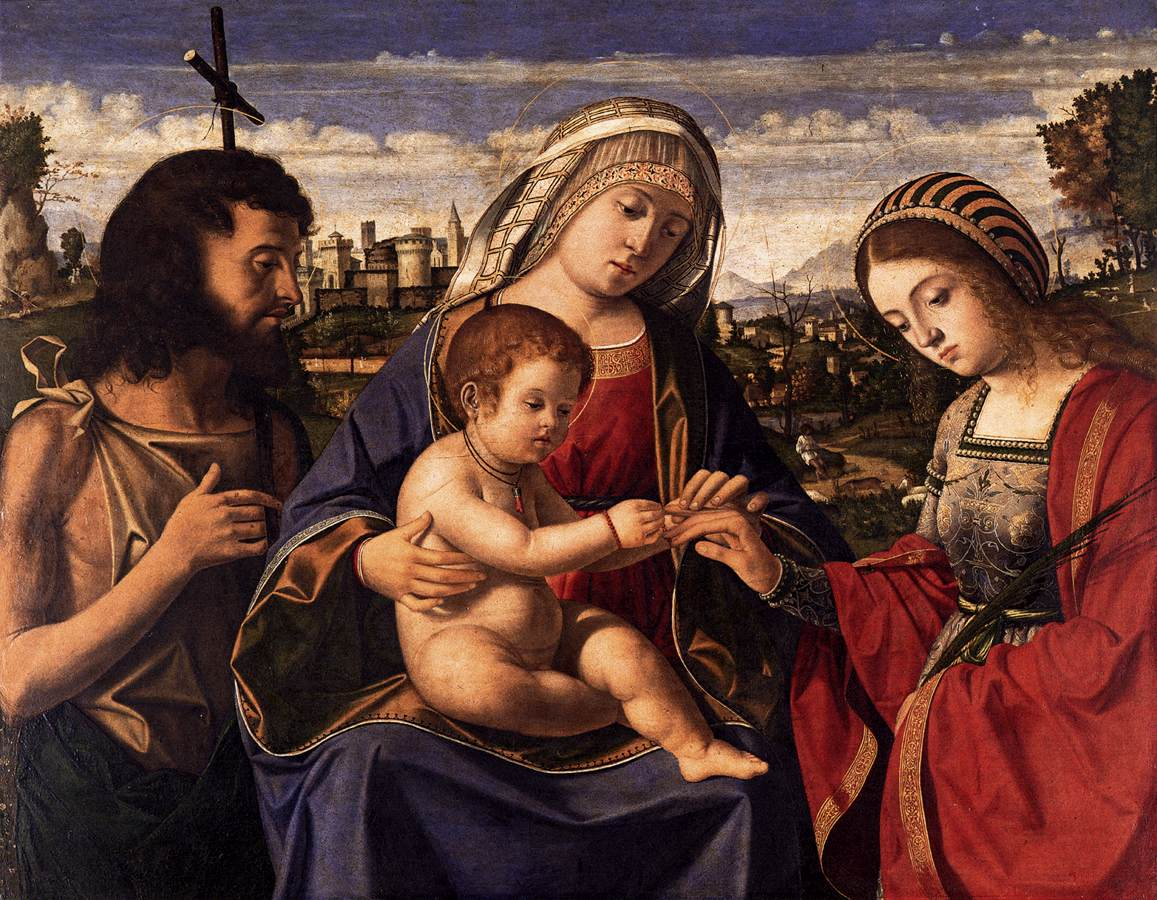
Madonna and Child with St John the Baptist and St Catherine of Alexandria (c. 1504) by Andrea Previtali

Madonna and Child with St John the Baptist and St Catherine of Alexandria or Mystic Marriage of Saint Catherine with St John the Baptist is an oil on panel painting by Andrea Previtali, produced c. 1504, during his youthful years in Giovanni Bellini's studio. Belonging to the sacra conversazione genre, it is now in the sacristy of the church of San Giobbe in Venice, whilst a (probably later) autograph copy of the work is now in the National Gallery in London. The London work includes a scroll below Mary inscribed + 1504/Andrea Cordelle/Agi dissipulus/iouanis Bellini/pinxit and the number 24, variously interpreted as the artist's age or as his personal symbol using the signus tabellanolis, a technique used by 16th century notaries the better to identify works' and documents' authenticity.

The Child wears a necklace with a coral pendant around his neck. This has been a highly symbolic element since ancient times. Several works also depict this detail, such as the painting Madonna and Child by Jacobello da Messina, now in the Accademia Carrara in Bergamo, or the Madonna di Senigallia by Piero della Francesca, but these are works that Previtali could not have known. Coral is an ornament that has been believed to have protective properties against calamities since Roman times, and to have pharmacological properties for the treatment of neonatal diseases, as indicated by Calinno Leonardi in Speculun lapidum published in 1502. Leonardi believed that the powder obtained from coral filings had almost magical powers of healing and prevention of epileptic diseases. In the Middle Ages, faith led to the belief that prayer addressed to Jesus and the saints could preserve one from all illnesses, therefore combining the two things must have been of greater help in chasing away evil. These representations were also placed above the entrance doors of homes to protect their inhabitants.

The painting features a visibly Belliniesque Saint John the Baptist which can be associated with the Madonna and Child with Saint John the Baptist and a Female Saint of ca. 1503, while the landscape in the background of the canvas, despite having the same location, more closely reflects the architecture of the Orobic city with the mountains on the horizon. The image of Saint Catherine of Alexandria is different, with a very young appearance and richly dressed, wrapped in a red cloak, holding the palm, a sign of martyrdom.
