= Madonna and Child with Saint John the Baptist and a Female Saint =

Painting by Giovanni Bellini

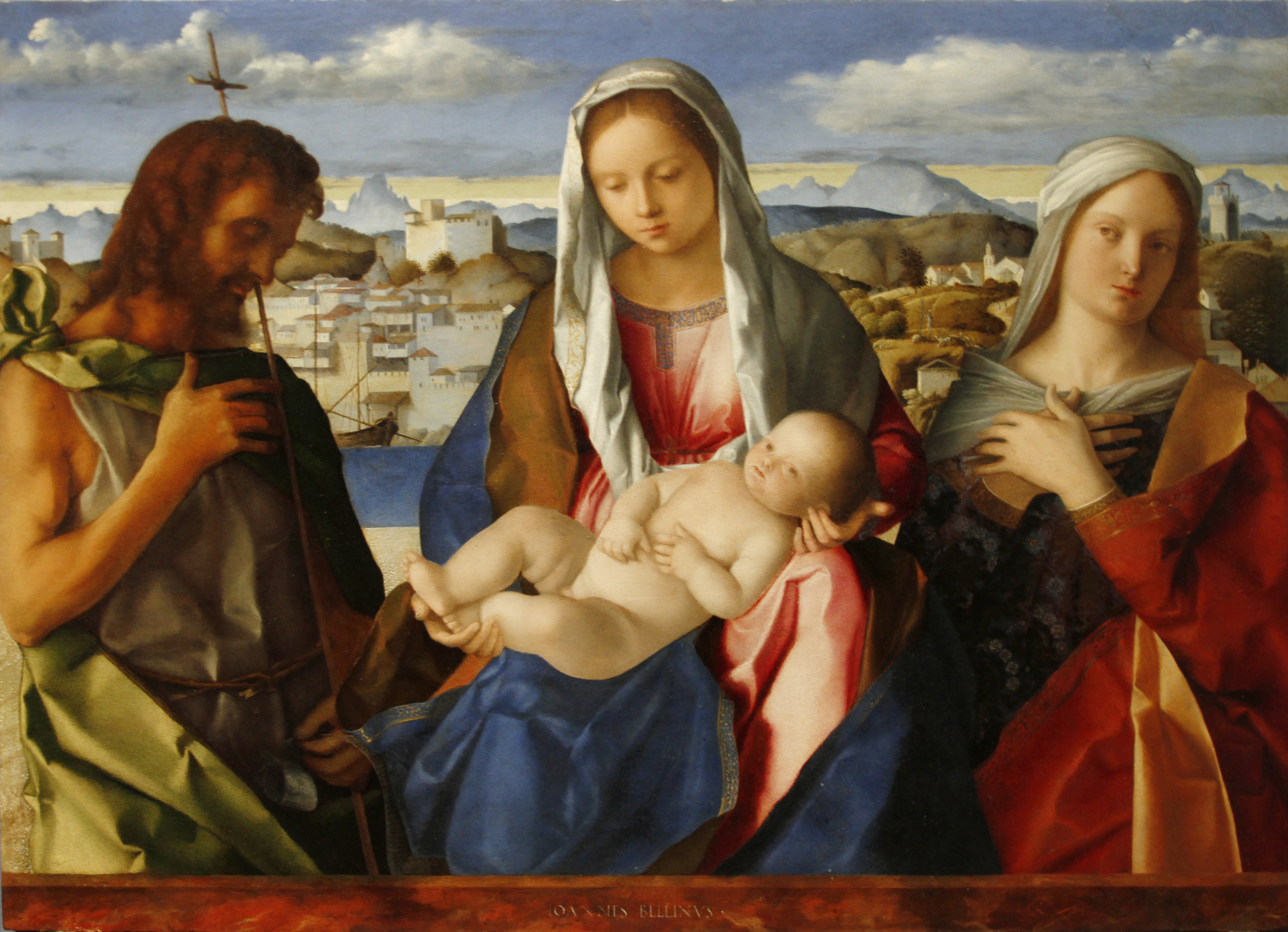
- Artist: Giovanni Bellini
- Year: Before 1504
- Medium: Oil on panel
- Dimensions: 54 cm × 76 cm (21 in × 30 in)
- Location: Gallerie dell'Accademia, Venice

The Madonna and Child with Saint John the Baptist and a Female Saint or the Giovanelli Sacred Conversation is an oil painting on panel by the Italian Renaissance master Giovanni Bellini, dated to before 1504. It is in the Gallerie dell'Accademia, Venice.

== History ==
The painting is signed by Bellini on the balustrade in the foreground. The painting is dated to before 1504, because its figure of John the Baptist was copied by Andrea Previtali in one of his own paintings.

Its last private owner was Prince Giovanelli, prior to its entering the collection of the Gallerie dell'Accademia.

== Description and style ==
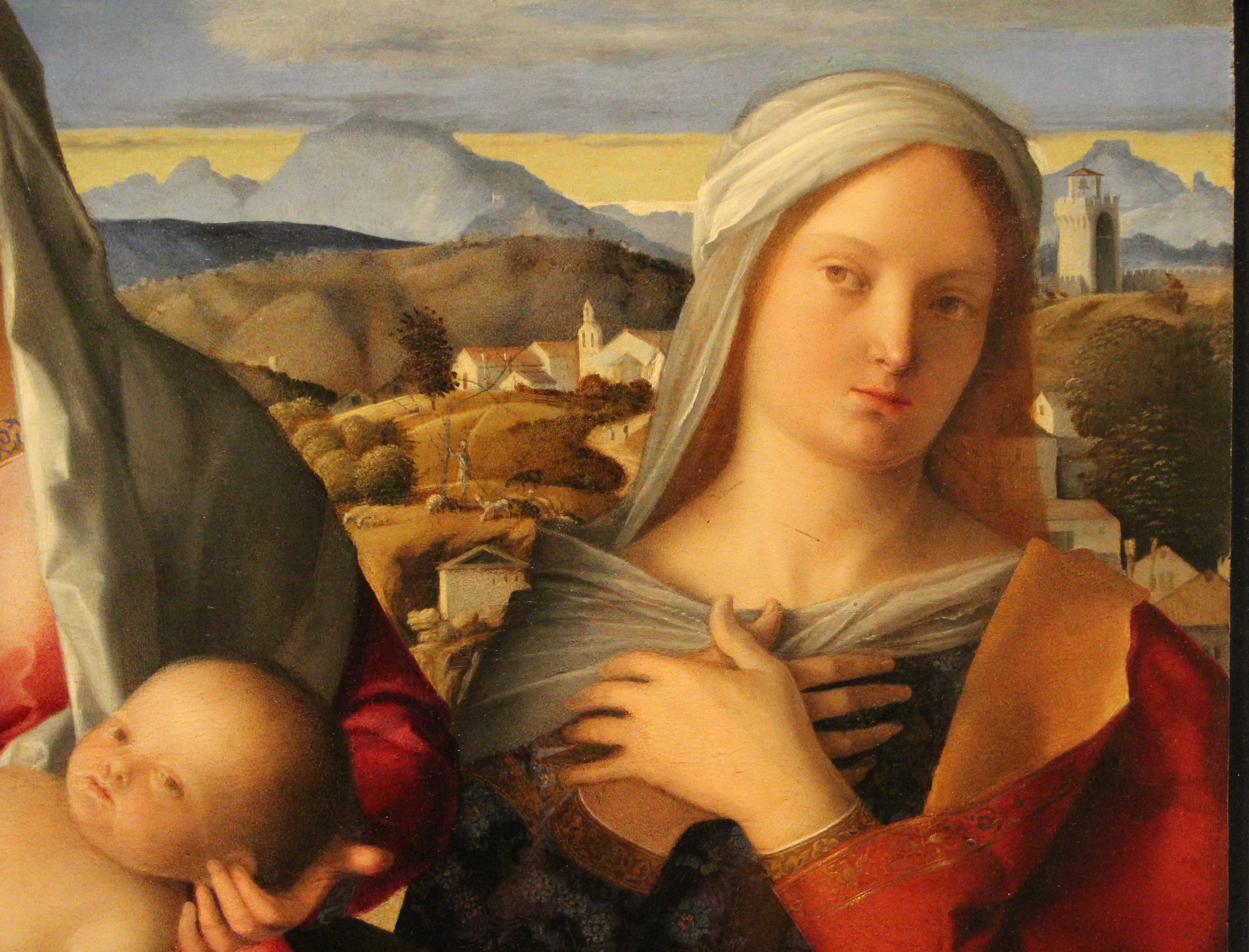
Detail of the female saint at right and the landscape behind her

The Virgin Mary sits with the Christ Child in her lap, flanked by Saint John the Baptist on her left and another saint at right, possibly Mary Magdalene or Catherine of Alexandria. Saint John is identifiable by his beard and the cross-bearing staff. The background displays castles, a gated city (possibly Ancona), and a countryside punctuated by houses and a shepherd with his flock. The distant mountains are painted with blue to capture a misty quality, after the Venetian rules of aerial perspective.

This panel painting is often associated with the sacra conversazione genre. The people in the foreground are separated from the background in a typical 15th-century manner (as used by Bellini in his Madonna del Prato), but given atmospheric qualities thanks to the use of warm lighting. The landscape and the figures are unified through their shared use of delicate, clear tones of color.

== See also ==
- List of works by Giovanni Bellini

== Bibliography ==
- Olivari, Mariolina (2007). "Giovanni Bellini". Pittori del Rinascimento (in Italian). Florence: Scala. ISBN 978-8881170999.
