= Virgin and Child with Saints Anthony Abbot, Jerome and Francis =

c. 1519 painting by Titian

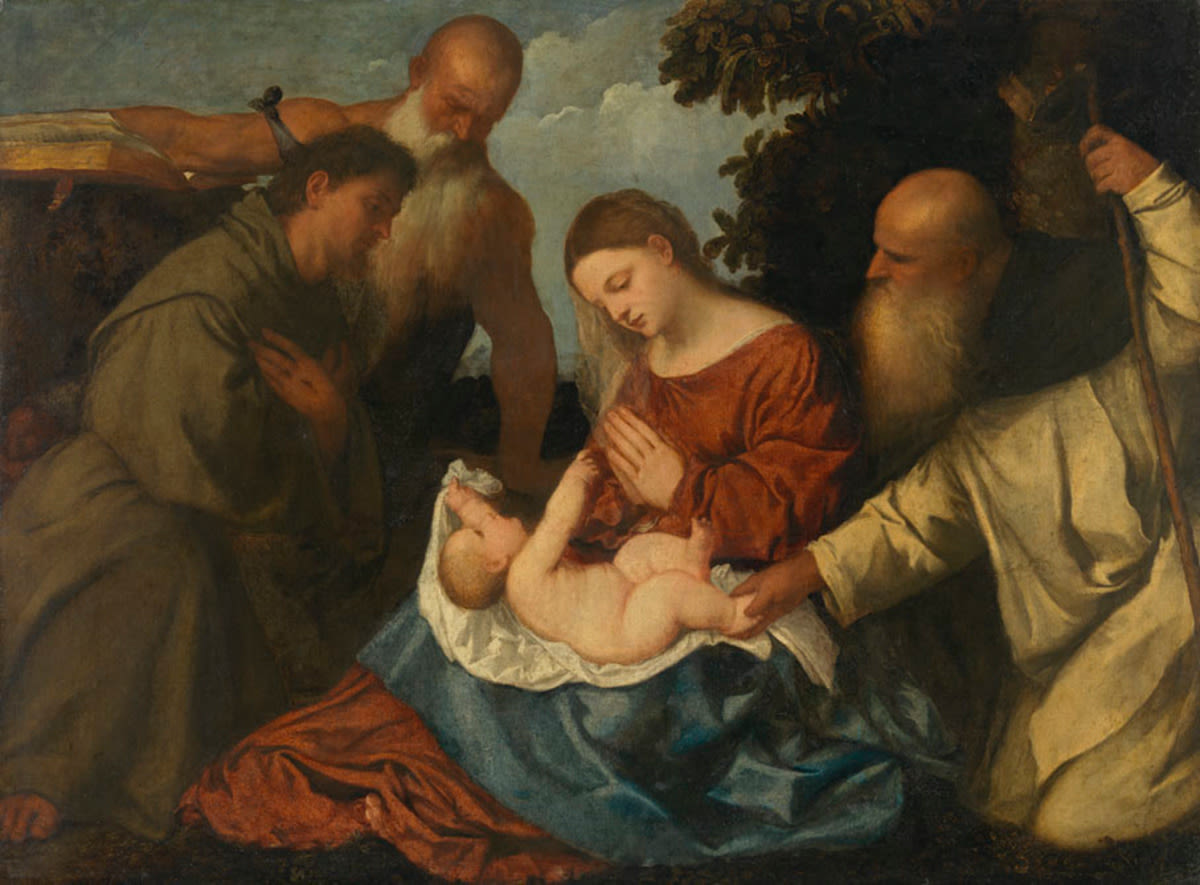
- Artist: Titian
- Year: c. 1519
- Medium: Oil on canvas
- Dimensions: 100 cm × 137 cm (39 in × 54 in)
- Location: Alte Pinakothek, Munich

Virgin and Child with Saints Anthony Abbot, Jerome and Francis, also known as Madonna and Child with Three Saints or Adoration of the Christ Child with Saints, is an oil on canvas painting by Titian, from c. 1519. It is held in the Alte Pinakothek, in Munich.

== Autorship ==
Carlo Ridolfi praised the work after seeing it in the collection of paintings that Jacopo Casciopino brought to Antwerp in the 17th century. Previously misattributed to Titian's elder brother Francesco Vecellio or Titian's studio, it was reidentified as an autograph work by Titian himself, in 1951, though its owner's online catalogue retains the traditional attribution to Francesco Veccellio. It is dated via its stylistic similarities to the Gozzi Altarpiece.

== Description ==
The adoration of the Child is staged in a rural landscape with a predominantly horizontal development. Mary is at the centre praying towards her son, on her knees, between a group of saints in several poses. From left to right, the adoring saints are Francis of Assisi, Jerome and Anthony Abbot.

== See also ==
- List of works by Titian
