= Madonna with Child between Sts. Flavian and Onuphrius =

Painting by Lorenzo Lotto

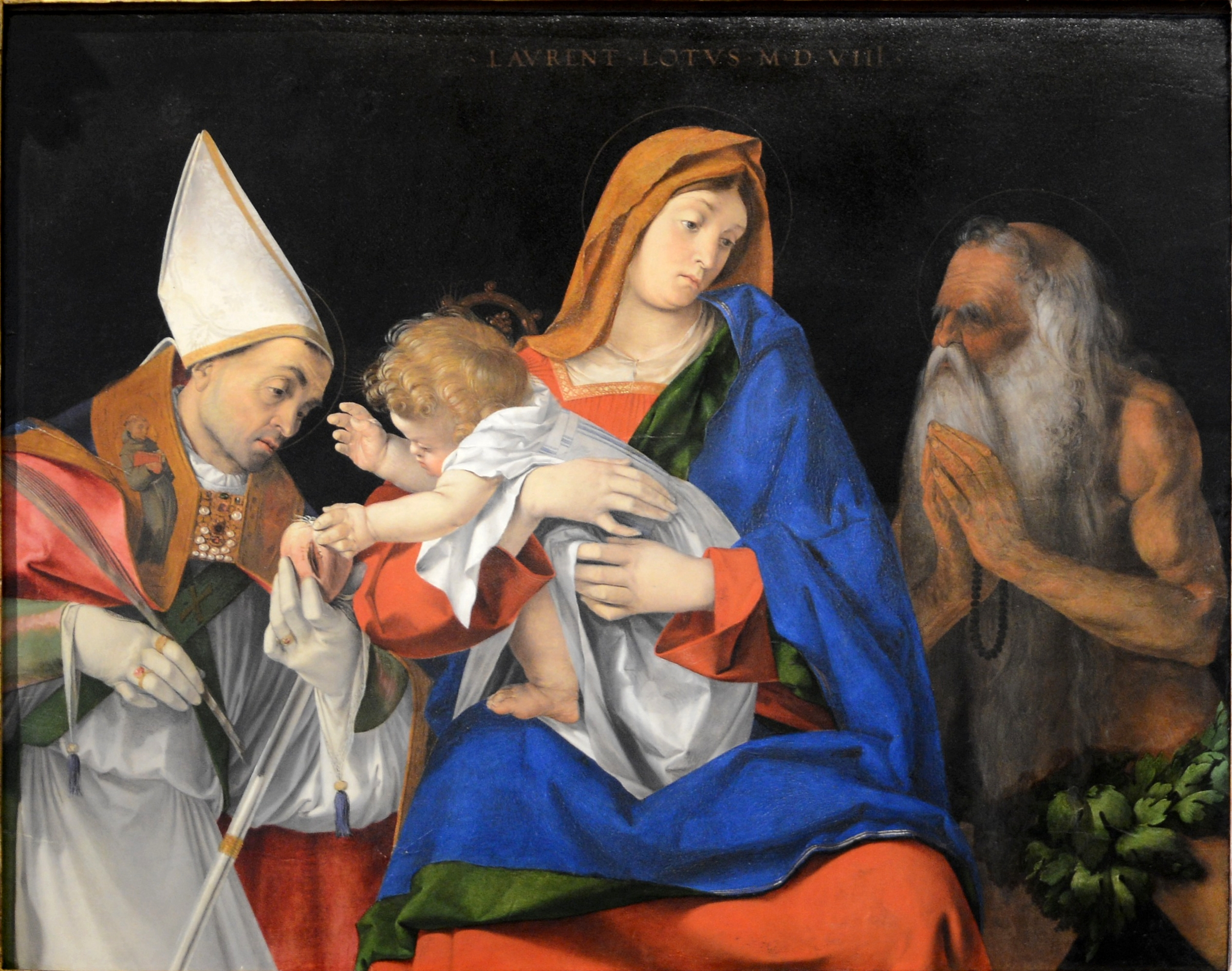
- Artist: Lorenzo Lotto
- Year: 1508
- Medium: Oil on panel
- Dimensions: 53 cm × 67 cm (21 in × 26 in)
- Location: Borghese Gallery, Rome

Madonna with Child between Saints Flavian and Onuphrius is an oil-on-panel painting by Lorenzo Lotto, signed and dated 1508, now in the Borghese Gallery, in Rome.

The painting was executed in the same year of the Recanati Polyptych, when Lotto moved to Rome (although it is not known if he had already painted it before leaving the Marche). It was first mentioned in a 1693 document, when it was already part of the Borghese Collection.

== Description ==
The painting uses the Holy Conversation composition, with the Madonna and Child in the center between two saints, a scheme widely used by Giovanni Bellini and other Venetian painters of the time.

It depicts, on a dark background, a thoughtful Madonna. The Child is rather fat, and is trying to reach St. Flavian of Ricina, painted on the left. The latter is offering Jesus a pierced heart, a symbol of the future Passion. The identification of Flavian, the patron of the city of Recanati in the Marche, is disputed, and some scholars identified him as Ignatius of Antioch: according to the legend, after his death his heart opened and the name of Jesus (as referred by Lotto with the monogram YHS on it) in golden letters.

On the right is Onuphrius the hermit, whose character was inspired by Dürer's Christ among the Doctors (Madrid, Museo Thyssen-Bornemisza), which the German artist had painted in Venice in 1506. Other elements recalling Dürer's works include the general asymmetry of the composition, the bright colors and the drapes, which Lotto had previous painted as screwed up paper, and are now instead softer and more colored.

== Sources ==
- Pirovano, Carlo (2002). Lotto. Milan: Electa.
