= Madonna and Child with Two Saints (Pisanello) =

Painting by Pisanello

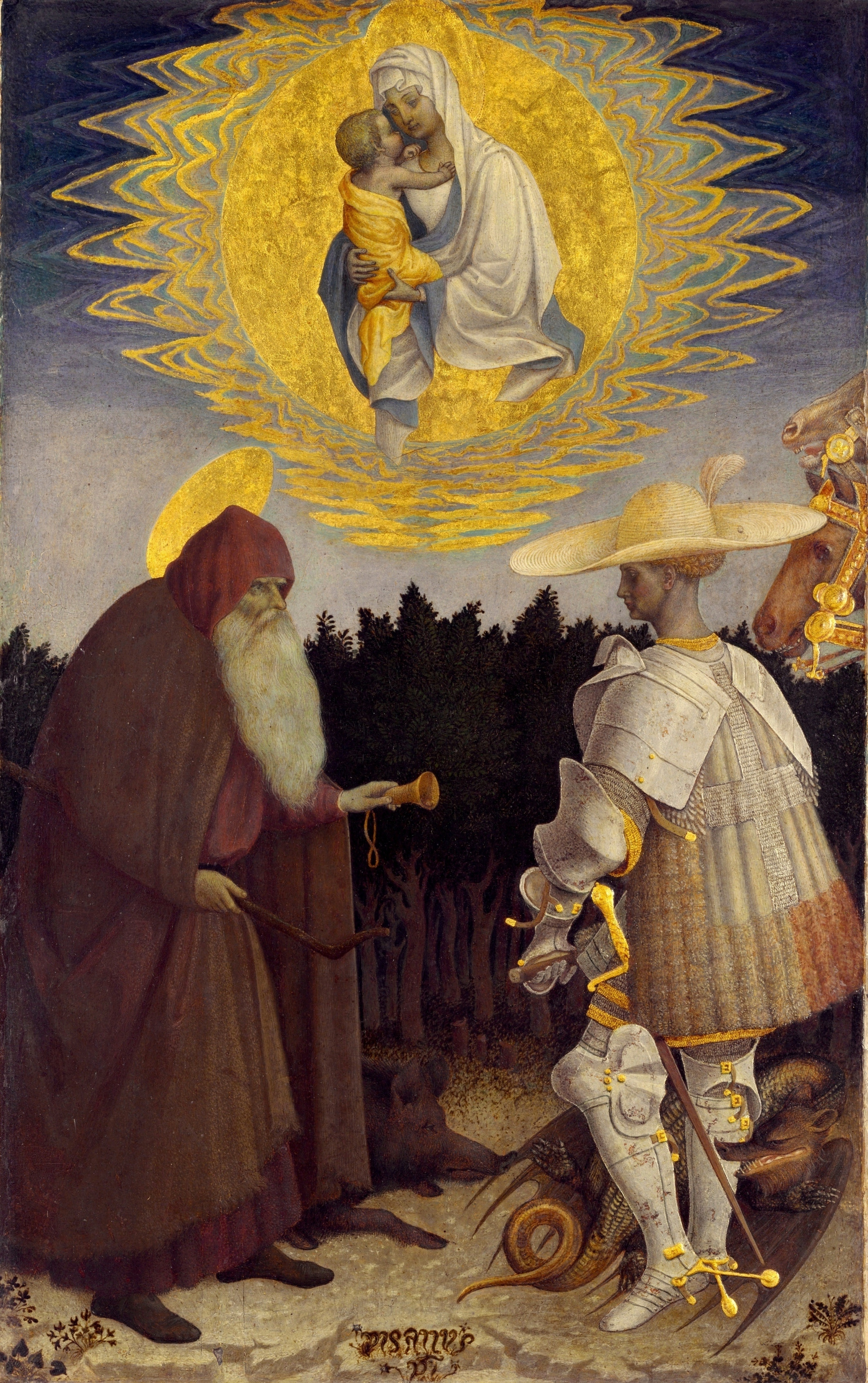
Madonna and Child with Two Saints (c. 1445) by Pisanello

Madonna and Child with Two Saints or Madonna and Child with Saint Anthony Abbot and Saint George is a tempera and gold on panel painting by the Italian artist Pisanello, dating to around 1445. It is in the collection of the National Gallery, London.

The painting is Pisanello's only surviving signed panel painting. His signature, Pisanus, appears on the lower part of the work.

== Description ==
The painting depicts the Virgin Mary holding the Christ Child, with Saint Anthony Abbot and Saint George standing on either side. The figures are placed before an elaborate architectural and landscape setting characteristic of Pisanello's courtly style. Saint Anthony Abbot is identifiable by his abbot's clothing and attributes, while Saint George is associated with the dragon and his role as a Christian warrior.

The work combines religious imagery with detailed representations of the natural world. Pisanello was particularly known for his careful observation of animals, plants, costumes and landscape, and these details form an important part of the painting's visual character.

The Virgin and Child occupy the central position, while the two saints create a balanced arrangement on either side. The elaborate setting and rich details reflect the courtly culture of northern Italy in the first half of the 15th century.

== Provenance ==
The earliest documented provenance of the painting places it in the Costabili collection in Ferrara in 1841. It was subsequently acquired in 1862 by the British collector and art historian Sir Charles Eastlake, then Director of the National Gallery.

After Eastlake's death, his widow, Elizabeth Eastlake, left the painting to the National Gallery, where it entered the collection in 1867.

== Attribution and dating ==
The painting is generally dated to around 1445. Its attribution to Pisanello is supported by the signature Pisanus and by its relationship to the artist's other works from the 1440s.

Pisanello was active at several northern Italian courts during this period, including those of Mantua, Ferrara and Verona. His work combined the late International Gothic tradition with increasingly naturalistic observation, making him an important figure in the transition toward the Italian Renaissance.
