= Madonna and Child with Two Saints (Bicci) =

c. 1475 painting by Neri di Bicci

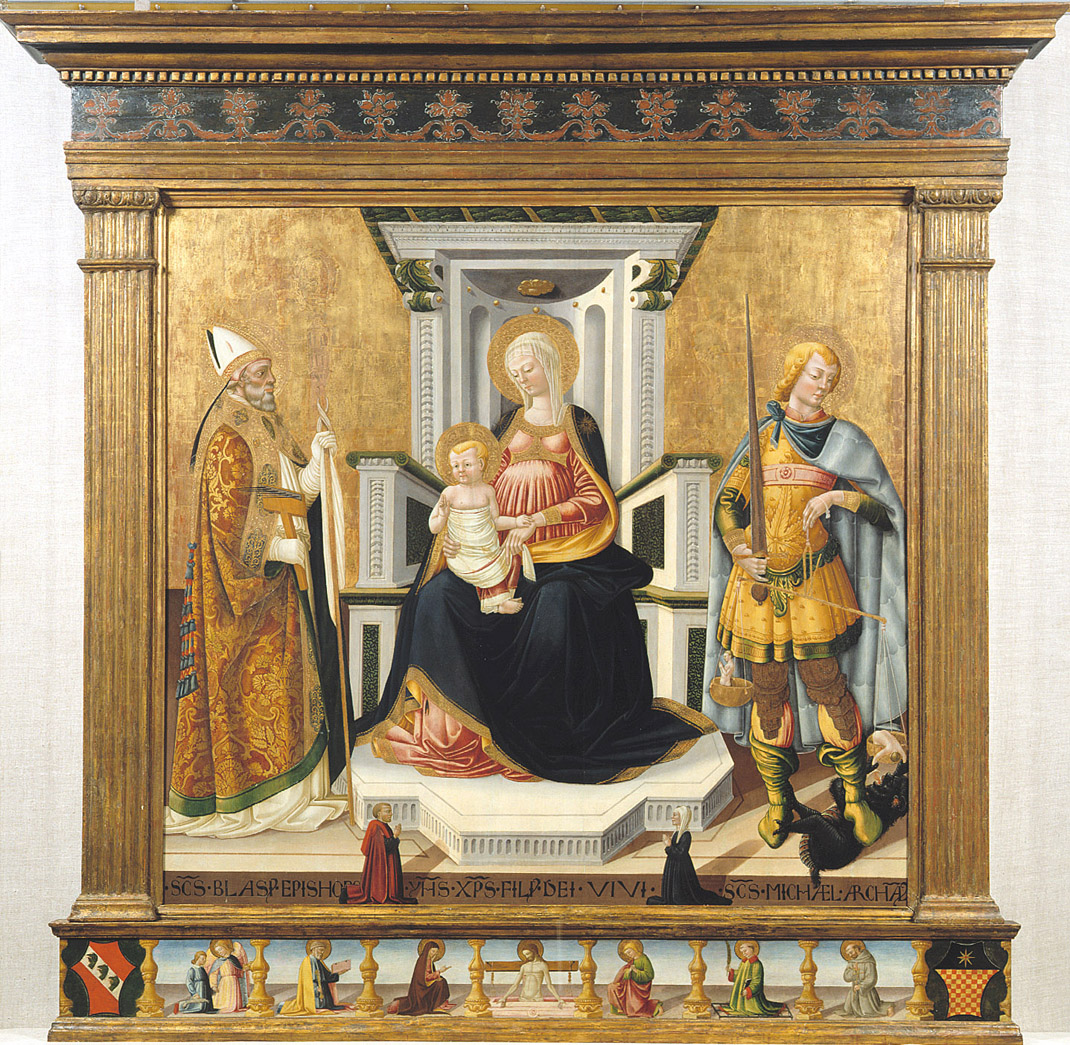
Madonna and Child with Two Saints (c. 1475) by Neri di Bicci

Madonna and Child with Two Saints is an tempera and gold on panel altarpiece by Neri di Bicci, created c. 1475. It is held now in the Montreal Museum of Fine Arts, to which it was left by John W. Tempest in 1892. It is on show in the Jean-Noël Desmarais pavilion on level 4 of the Museum.

It is a Madonna and Child of the Maestà and sacra conversazione types. To the right is Michael the Archangel with armour, sword and scales, treading Satan beneath his feet. To the left is Saint Blaise dressed as a bishop with the instruments of his martyrdom. Below the main panel is a predella centred around the Dead Christ, with Tobias, Raphael, St Peter and the Virgin Mary to the left and saints John the Evangelist, Lawrence and Francis of Assisi to the right, all framed by two coats of arms, probably those of the donors.
