= Madonna and Child with Two Saints (Perugino, Vienna) =

Painting by Pietro Perugino

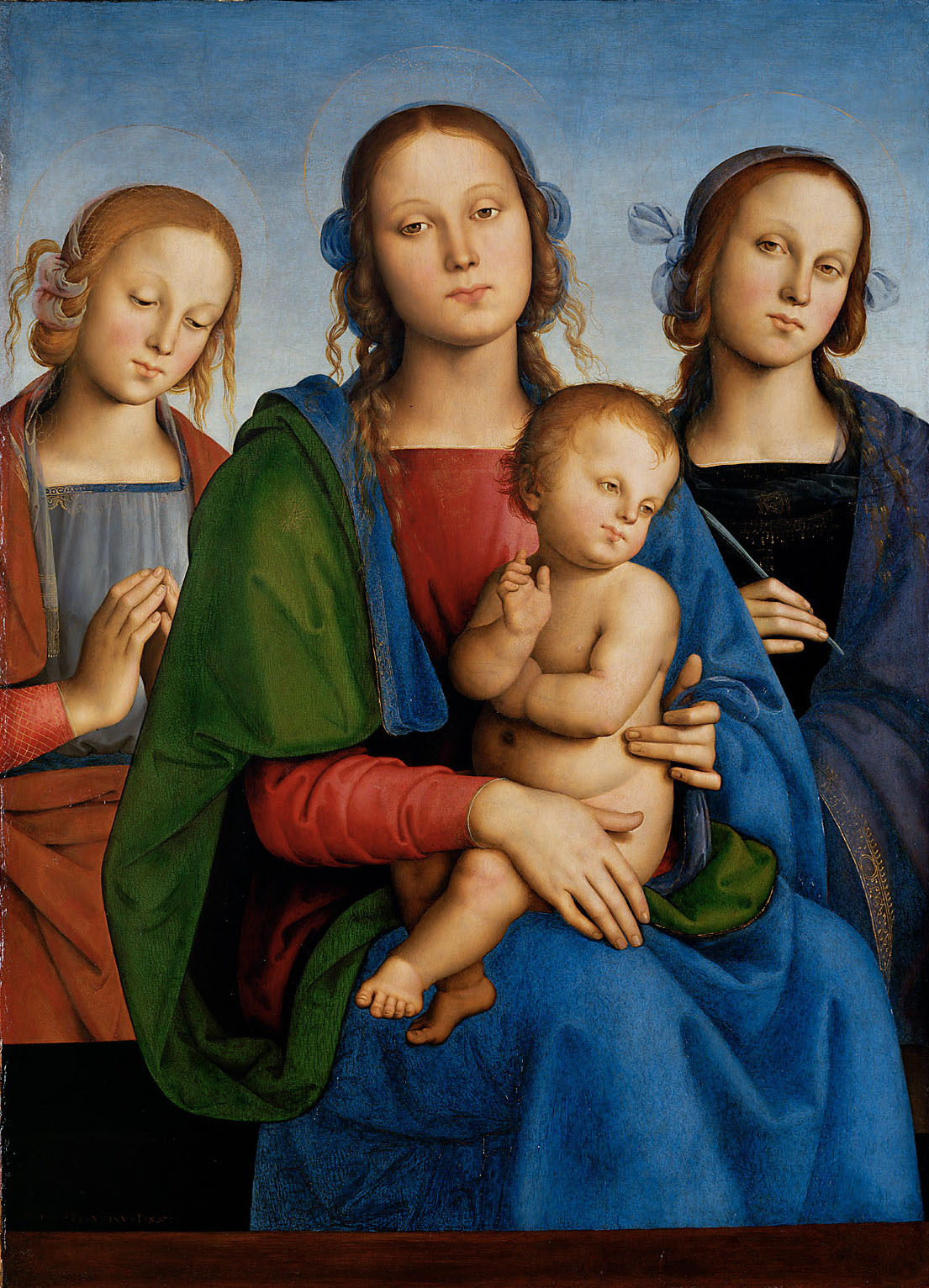
- Artist: Pietro Perugino
- Year: 1493–1495
- Medium: Tempera on panel
- Dimensions: 85,6 cm × 63 cm (337 in × 25 in)
- Location: Kunsthistorisches Museum, Vienna

The Madonna and Child with Two Saints is a painting in tempera on panel by Pietro Perugino, dating to around 1495. It is now in the Kunsthistorisches Museum in Vienna. The saint to the right is Catherine of Alexandria; the saint to the left is unidentified but may be Rose of Viterbo or Mary Magdalene.

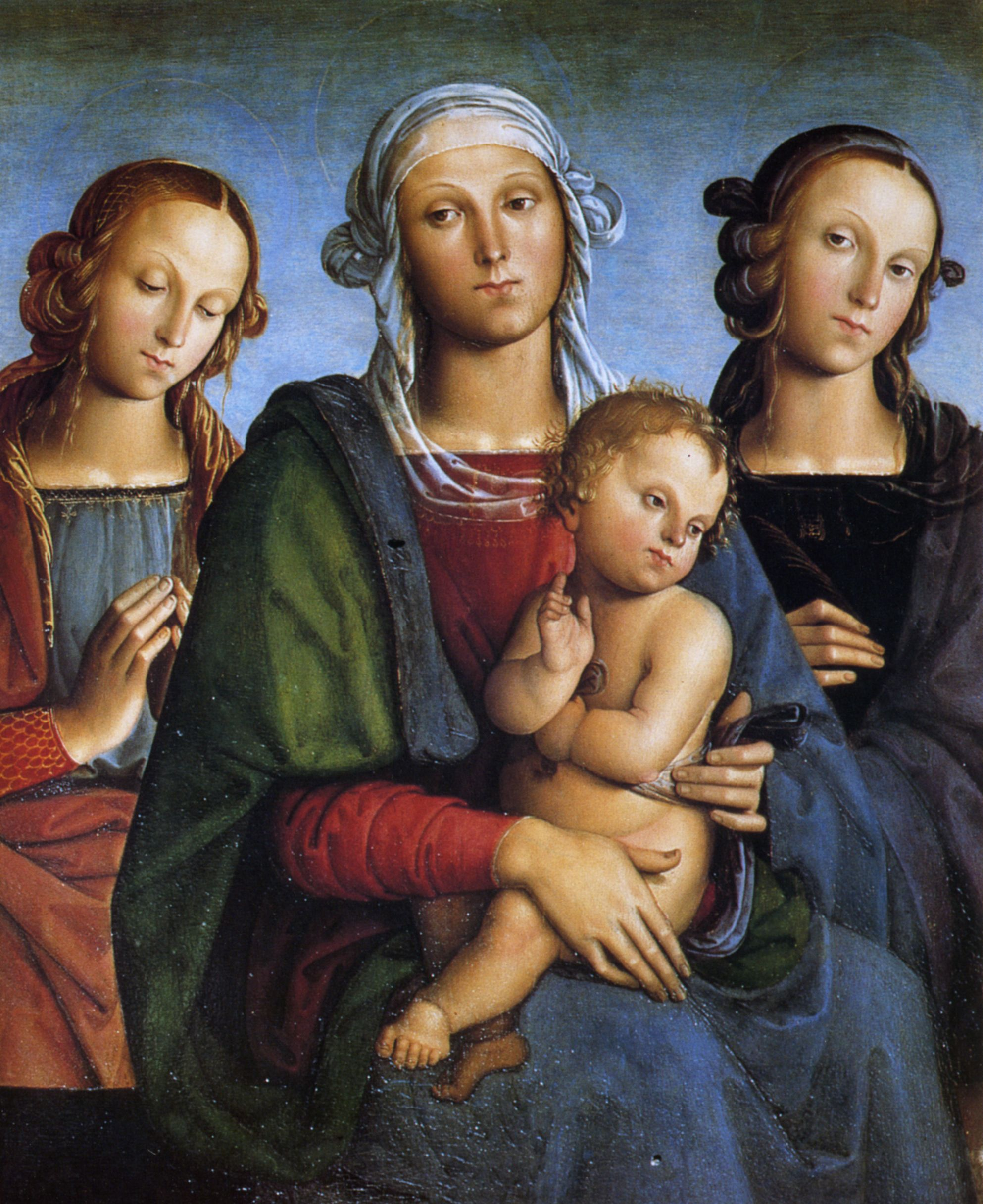
Copy in the Galleria Palatina, Florence

== Bibliography (in Italian) ==
- Vittoria Garibaldi, Perugino, in Pittori del Rinascimento, Scala, Florence, 2004 ISBN 888117099X
- Pierluigi De Vecchi, Elda Cerchiari, I tempi dell'arte, volume 2, Bompiani, Milan, 1999. ISBN 88-451-7212-0
- Stefano Zuffi, Il Quattrocento, Electa, Milan, 2004. ISBN 8837023154
