= Madonna and Child with Two Saints and a Donor =

Painting by Gentile da Fabriano

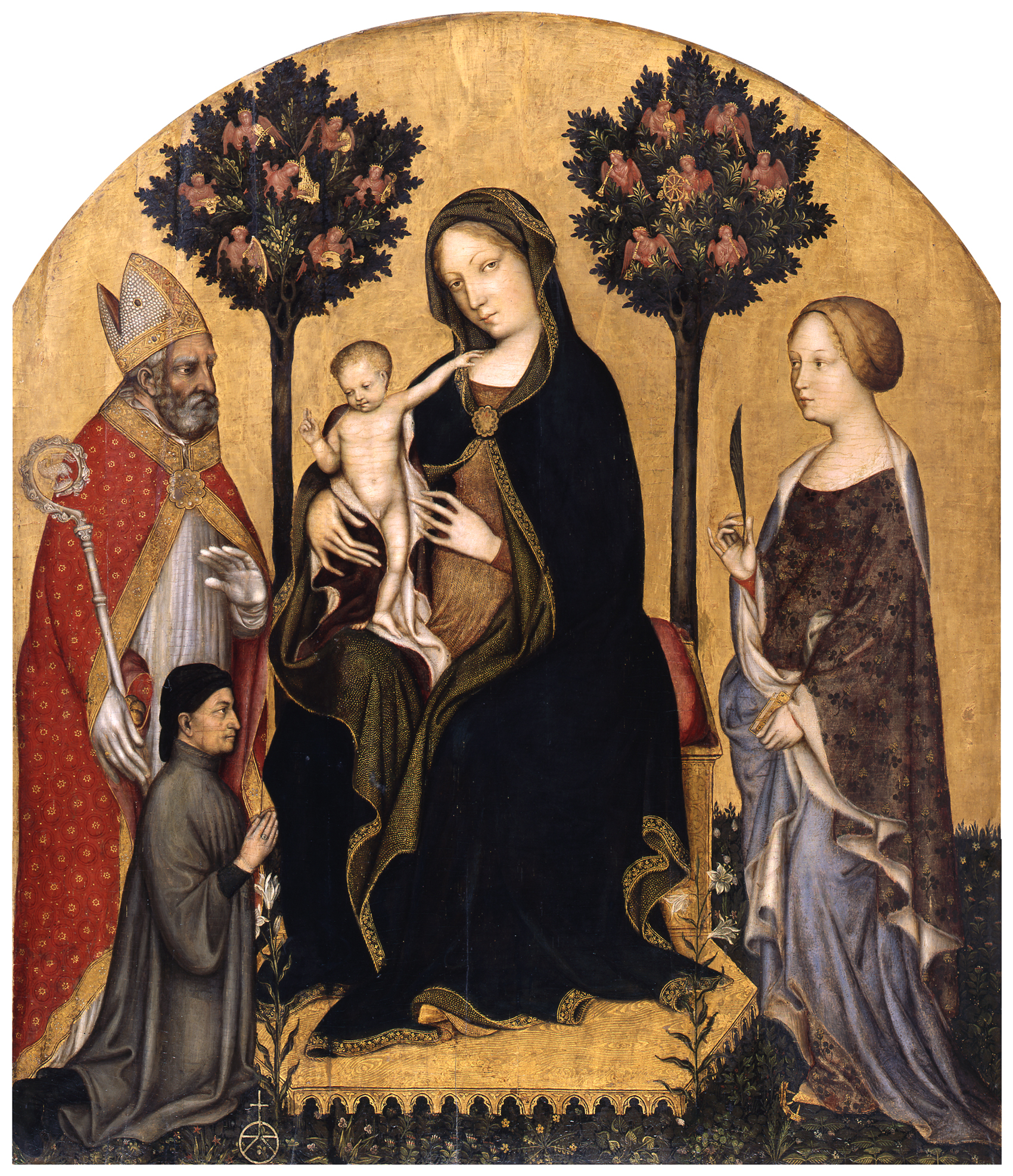
Madonna and Child with Two Saints and a Donor (c. 1395–1400) by Gentile da Fabriano

Madonna and Child with Two Saints and a Donor is a c. 1395–1400 painting in tempera and gold leaf on panel by the Italian artist Gentile da Fabriano, the earliest surviving major work by the artist. Probably painted for the church of Santa Caterina in Castelvecchio in Fabriano (the painter's father lived near that church from 1385 onwards after being widowed). It is now in the Gemäldegalerie in Berlin.

On the right is Catherine of Alexandria, referring to the name of the church for which the work was probably produced. To the left is Nicholas of Bari presenting the work's donor. The donor is dressed as a merchant and may be Ambrogio di Bonaventura (died between 1395 and 1408), whose golden mark (a circle with rays surmounted by a cross) is to be seen at his feet.
