= Madonna and Child with Three Saints (Mantegna) =

Painting attributed to Andrea Mantegna

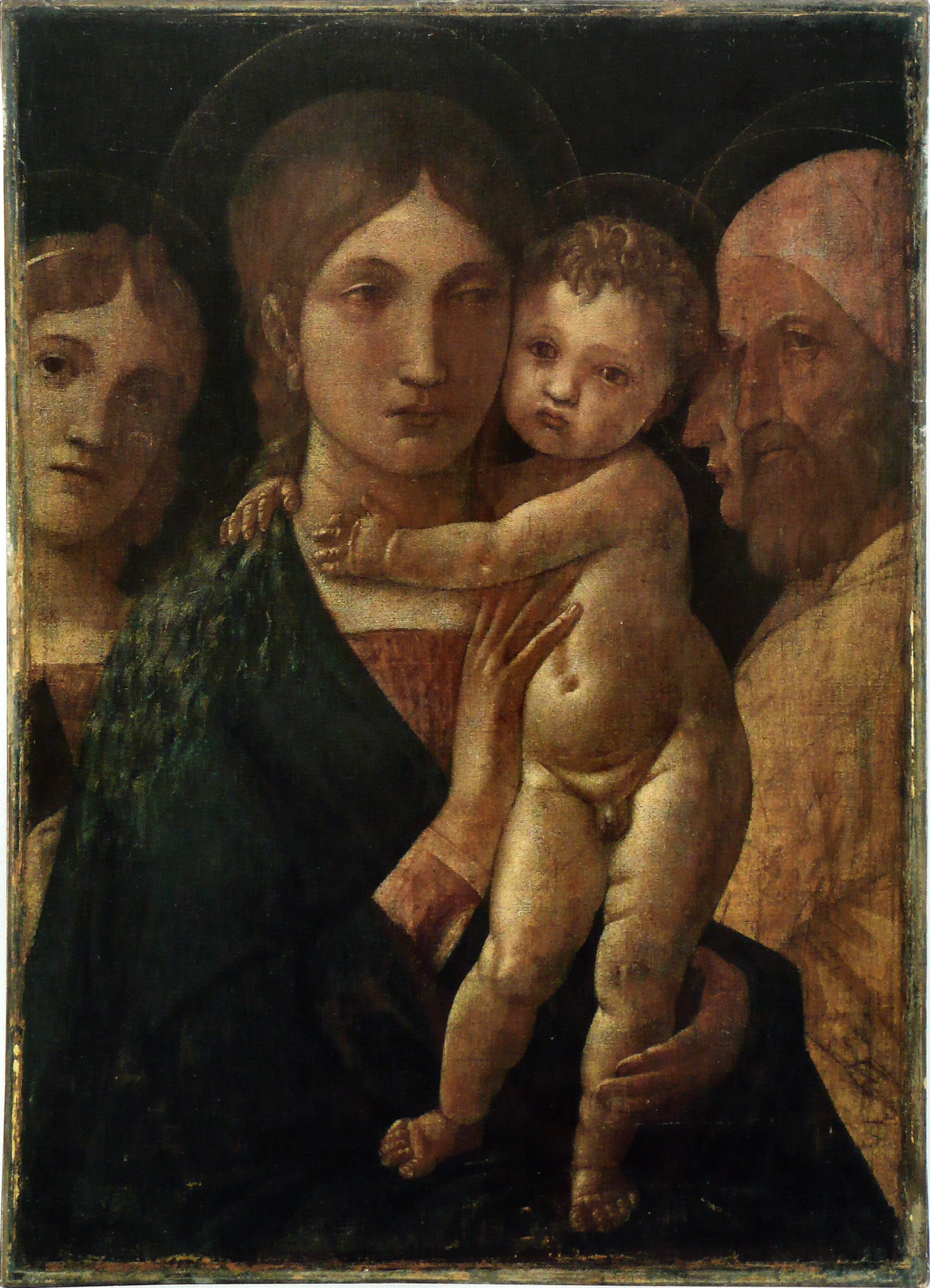
- Artist: Andrea Mantegna
- Year: 1490-1500
- Medium: tempera on canvas
- Dimensions: 57 cm × 42 cm (22 in × 17 in)
- Location: Musée Jacquemart-André, Paris

The Madonna and Child with Three Saints is a 1490-1500 tempera on canvas painting attributed to Andrea Mantegna, now in the Musée Jacquemart-André in Paris. Heavily damaged, not all art historians attribute it as an autograph work. If it is, it belongs to a group of small-format Madonnas for private devotions, which also includes Holy Family with Saints Anne and John the Baptist (Dresden), Holy Family with a Female Saint (Verona) and Madonna and Child with Saints (Turin). The Madonna's face touches that of her son in a manner reminiscent of the Madonna with Sleeping Child (Berlin). To the left is a female saint, possibly Mary Magdalene, whilst to the right are saint Joseph and another unidentifiable male saint.
