= Ranelli =

Ranelli is an Italian surname. Notable people with the surname include:

- Lorenzo Ranelli (born 1996), Italian footballer
- Sam Ranelli (1920–1999), American jazz drummer

== See also ==
- Manelli
- Ramelli
