= Holy Family with the Infant Saint John the Baptist (Mantegna) =

Painting attributed to Andrea Mantegna

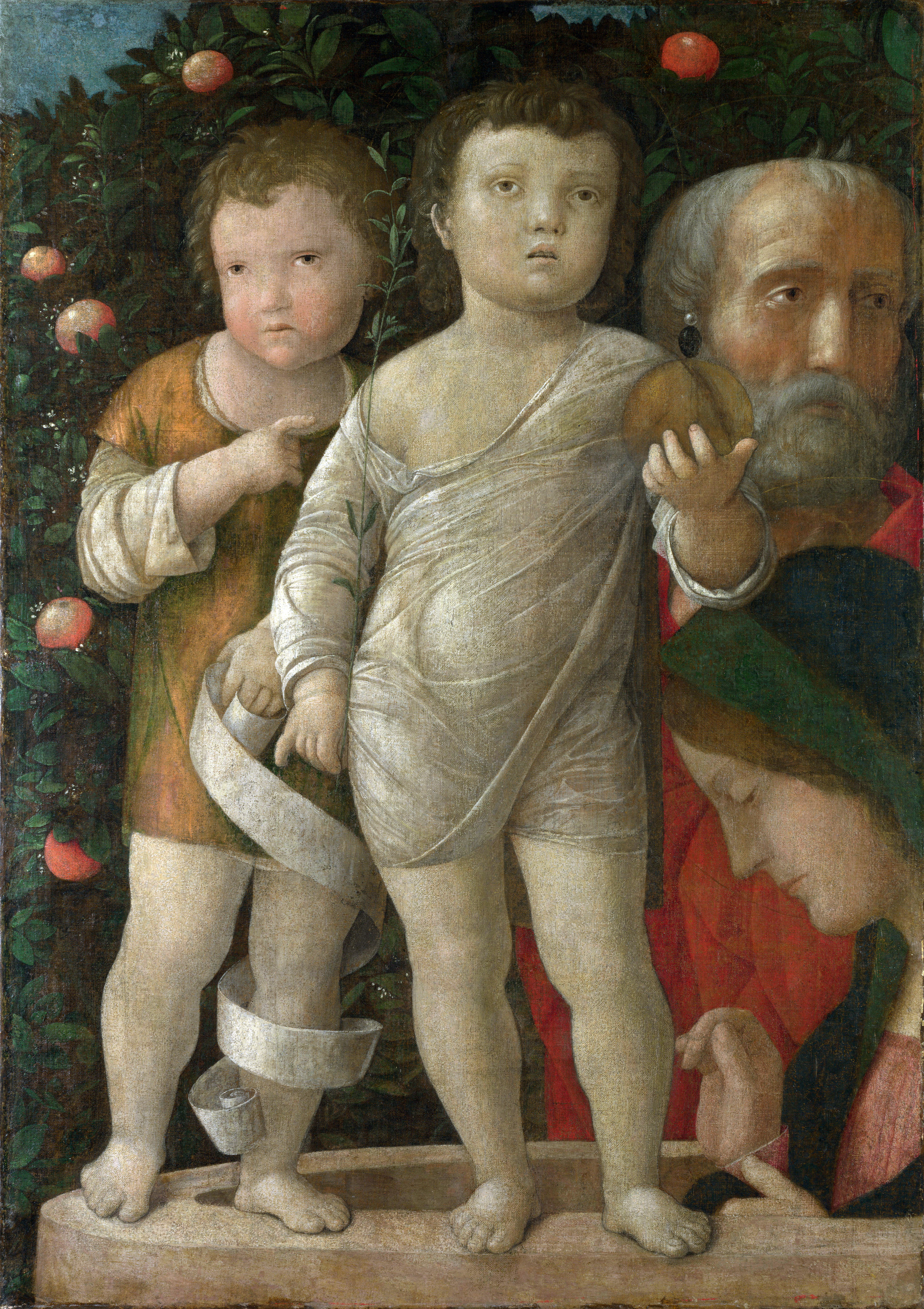
- Artist: Andrea Mantegna
- Year: 1500
- Medium: tempera on canvas
- Dimensions: 71 cm × 50.5 cm (28 in × 19.9 in)
- Location: National Gallery, London

The Holy Family with the Infant Saint John the Baptist is a tempera on canvas painting measuring 71 cm by 50.5 cm. It is attributed to Andrea Mantegna, dated to around 1500 and now held in the National Gallery, London. Due to its poor conservation the autograph is unclear, so some scholars do not directly attribute it to Mantegna. Those that do argue its idea and format definitely refer to autographed works by him.

The parapet on which the Christ Child and the infant John the Baptist stand also encloses the Virgin Mary, referring to the Virgin birth of Jesus and the hortus conclusus of the Virgin Mary's virginity. John holds a scroll and points to Christ, who holds a sphere representing his earthly power. In the background is Saint Joseph in a red cloak.

== History ==
The Madonna and Child in the work are identical to those in Mantegna's Holy Family with Christ as Imperator mundi in the Petit Palais in Paris. He produced several similar small-format works for private devotion during this period, of which the best is perhaps the Holy Family with Saints Anne and John the Baptist (Dresden), though the London work's background of fruit and foliage is also reminiscent of his Madonna della Vittoria (1496) and his Altman Madonna (c.1495-1505).
