= Ramelli =

Ramelli is a surname. Notable people with the surname include:

- Agostino Ramelli (1531–1600), Italian engineer
- Abbot Giovanni Felice Ramelli (1666–1740), Italian painter
- Ilaria Ramelli (born 1973), Italian historian and author
- Sergio Ramelli, (1956-1975), Italian student, victim of a political crime

== See also ==
- Ranelli
