= Mannelli =

Mannelli is an Italian surname. Notable people with the surname include:

- Caesar Mannelli (1897–1936), American rugby union player
- Carlo Mannelli (1640–1697), Italian violinist, castrato and composer
- Francesco Mannelli (c. 1595–1667), Italian Baroque composer, particularly of opera, and theorbo player
- Luca Mannelli (c. 1265–1364), Italian classicist and archbishop
- Luigi Mannelli (1939–2017), Italian water polo player
- Massimo Mannelli (born 1956), Italian golfer
- Maurizio Mannelli (1930–2014), Italian water polo player
- Riccardo Mannelli (born 1955), Italian artist and illustrator

== See also ==
- Manelli
