= Holy Family with Christ as Imperator mundi =

Painting attributed to Andrea Mantegna

The Holy Family with Christ as Imperator mundi
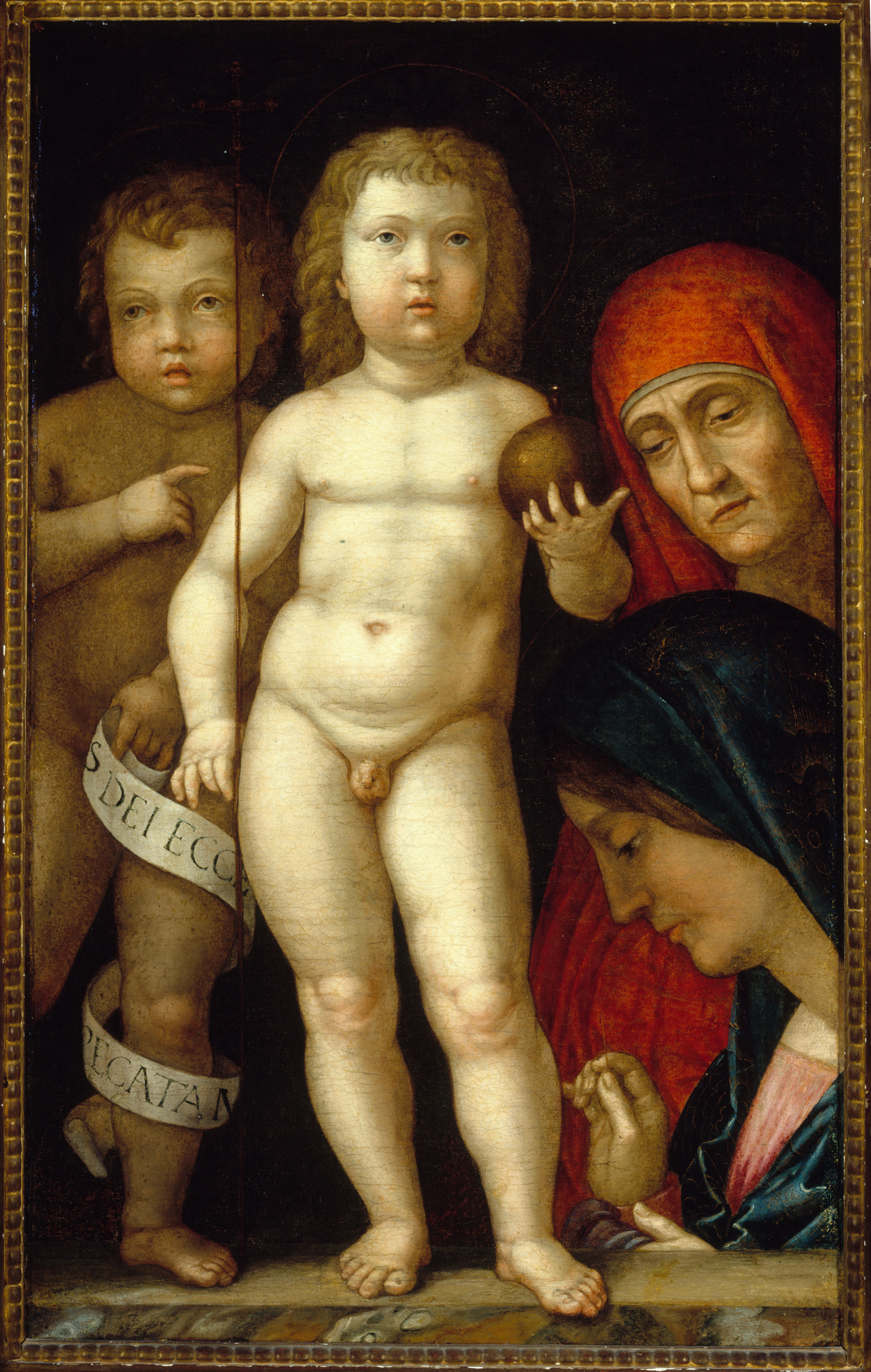
- Artist: Andrea Mantegna
- Year: 1490-1500
- Medium: tempera on canvas
- Dimensions: 71 cm × 50.5 cm (28 in × 19.9 in)
- Location: Petit Palais, Paris

The Holy Family with Christ as Imperator mundi is a 71 by 50.5 cm tempera on canvas painting dated to around 1490-1500. It is attributed to Andrea Mantegna (though its poor conservation prevents a definitive attribution to him) and now held in the Petit Palais in Paris.

The Virgin and Child are identical to those in Holy Family with the Infant Saint John the Baptist (London), whilst the Christ Child is reminiscent of several small-format works from the same period, of which the best is perhaps Holy Family with Saints Anne and John the Baptist (Dresden). It may be the earliest in the series and takes a more traditional approach, with the infant Christ and John the Baptist standing on a simple parapet and a black background, rather than the curved parapet and more nuanced background in the London example. John holds a scroll bearing Ecce Agnus Dei and points to Christ, who is shown as 'imperator mundi' or 'emperor of the world', holding a cross and an orb. There are gold highlights on the Virgin's veil, whilst behind her is a female saint, most probably her mother saint Anne or perhaps John's mother saint Elisabeth. Unusually, saint Joseph is absent.
