= Bust of Nicolas Poussin =

Marble portrait by François Duquesnoy

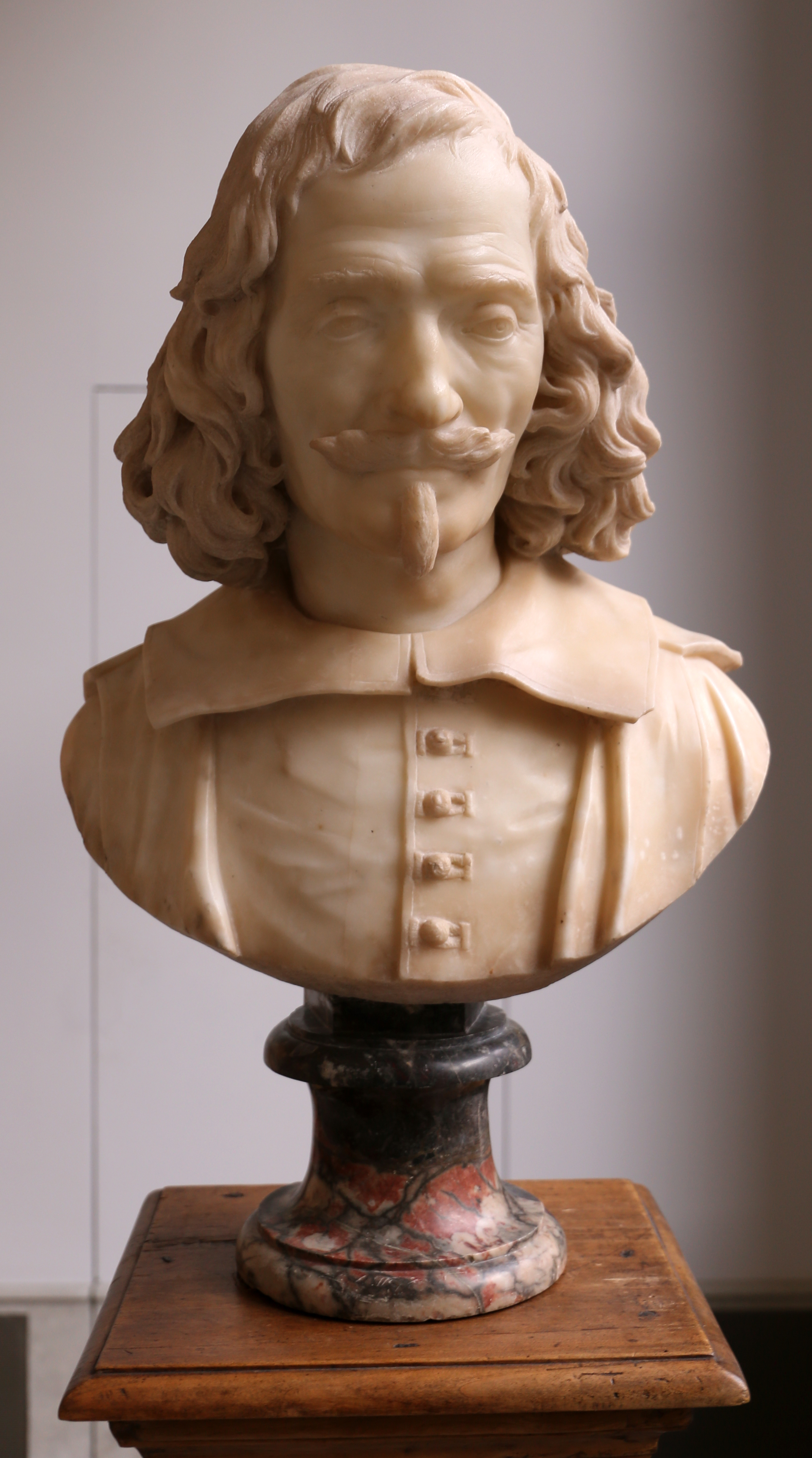
- Artist: François Duquesnoy
- Year: c. 1630
- Type: Sculpture
- Medium: Marble
- Subject: Nicolas Poussin
- Dimensions: 70.5 cm × 51.5 cm (27.7 in × 20.3 in)
- Location: Bode Museum; Berlin; 52°31′19″N 13°23′41″E

The Bust of Nicolas Poussin is a marble portrait bust by the Flemish sculptor François Duquesnoy. Nicolas Poussin was a close friend of Duquesnoy, and the leading classicist painter in 17th-century French art, although he spent most of his working life in Rome.

Both Poussin's and Duquesnoy's visions were at odds with the mainstream Baroque style of artists such as Gian Lorenzo Bernini and Pietro da Cortona. The portrait sculpture was completed in the 1630s, and is currently housed at the Bode Museum in Berlin.

== Sculpture ==
Duquesnoy was a close friend of a number of prominent artists in Rome; among these was Poussin. The two artists even shared a house in 1626.

Duquesnoy produced a small bust for Poussin, with details carefully worked out. The sitter has a melancholy face. The stylish rendering of moustache and beard and the composition itself are strongly reminiscent of Duquesnoy's Nano di Créqui and his bust of Cardinal Maurizio of Savoy. The physiognomy and the surface of the sitter's skin are delicately rendered; delicacy and sensitivity contrast with the long, curvy hair framing the sitter's face.
