= Maria Felice Tibaldi =

Italian artist (1707–1770)

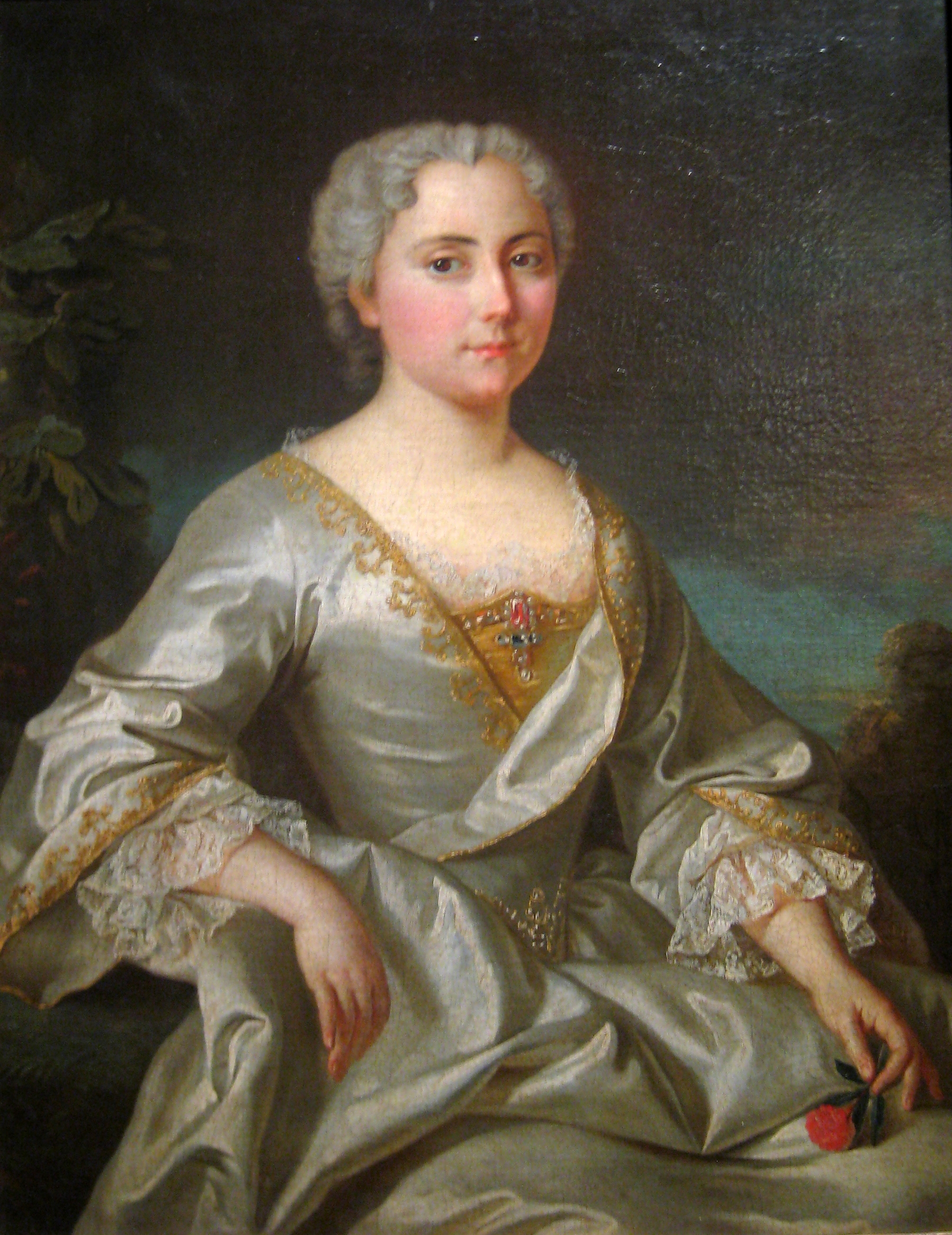
- Portrait by Pierre Subleyras, after 1739, oils; Deyneka Gallery, Kursk
- Born: 1707; Rome, Kingdom of Italy
- Died: 1770 (aged 62–63); Rome, Kingdom of Italy
- Known for: Portrait painting
- Notable work: Dinner at the House of the Pharisee
- Spouse: Pierre Subleyras (m. 1739; died 1749)

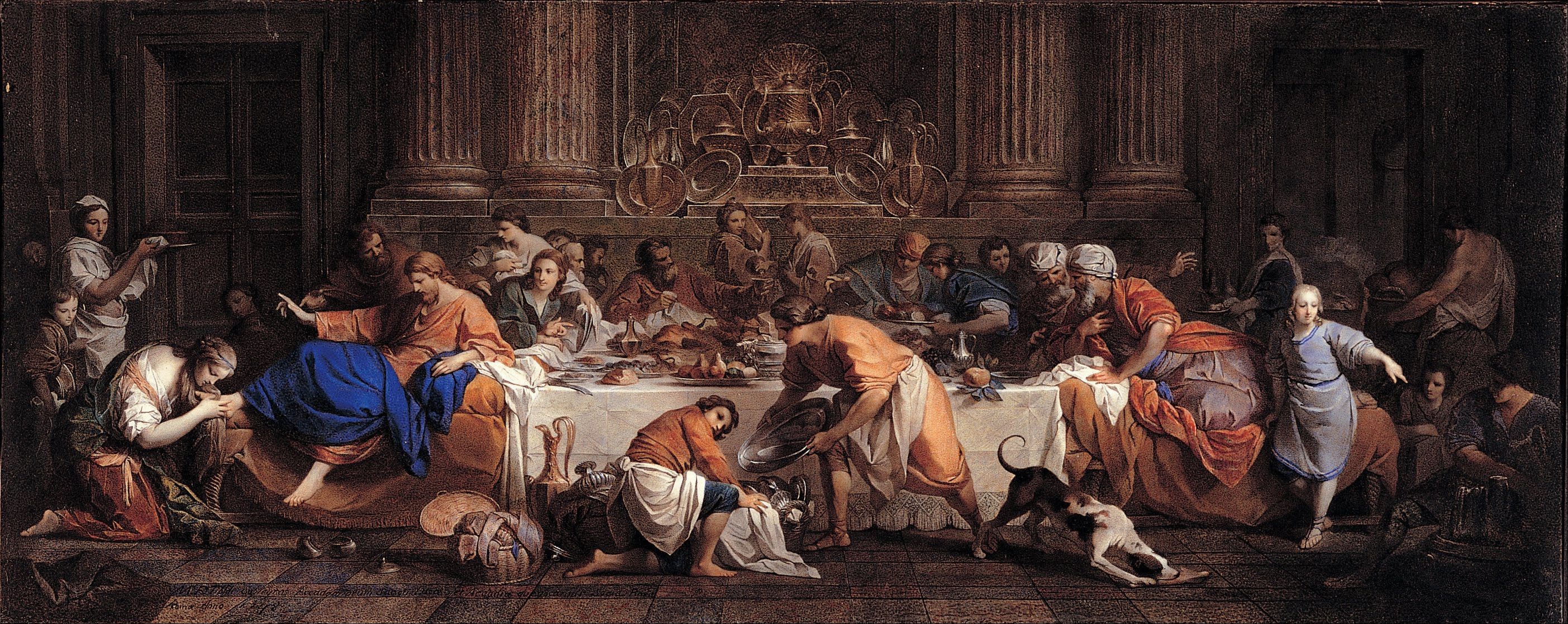
Dinner at the House of the Pharisee.

Maria Felice Tibaldi (1707–1770) was an Italian painter. She was born in Rome.

== Life ==
She painted portraits and historical subjects in oil and pastel, including portrait miniatures, among them, Bacchus and Ariadne and Angelica and Medoro. She married the painter Pierre Subleyras in 1739.

Her sisters, Teresa and Isabela were also artists in the same genre.

Her Dinner at the House of the Pharisee was included in the 1905 book Women Painters of the World. The image was accompanied with the quote "Mary Magdalene at the feet of Jesus Christ in the house of Simon the Pharisee, after the painting in Rome in the Galleria Capitolina. It is a copy after a picture by the artist's husband, Pierre Subleyras, a picture now in the Louvre, Paris. Maria Tibaldi Subleyras presented this copy to Pope Benedict XIV, who sent her a thousand scudi, and placed her work in his collection at the capitol."

== Sources ==
- Bryan, Michael (1889). Walter Armstrong; Robert Edmund Graves (eds.). Dictionary of Painters and Engravers, Biographical and Critical. Vol. II L-Z. London: George Bell and Sons. p. 570.
