= Holy Family with Saints Anne and John the Baptist (Mantegna) =

Painting by Andrea Mantegna

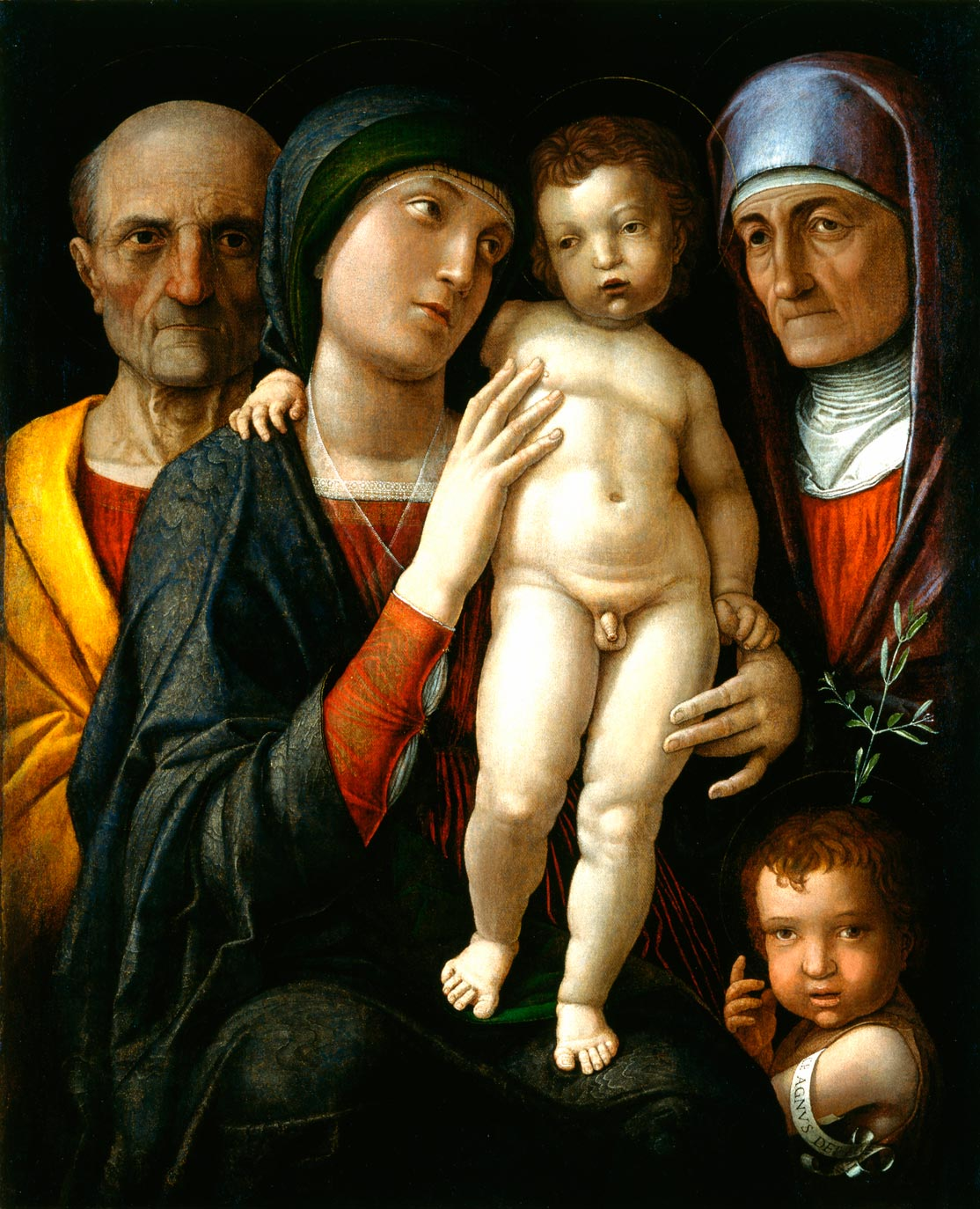
- Artist: Andrea Mantegna
- Year: 1495-1505
- Medium: tempera on canvas
- Dimensions: 75,5 cm × 61,5 cm (297 in × 242 in)
- Location: Gemäldegalerie, Dresden

The Holy Family with Saints Anne and John the Baptist is a tempera on canvas painting by Andrea Mantegna, dating to 1495-1500. It measures 75.5 cm by 61.5 cm and is now in the Gemäldegalerie in Dresden.

== History ==
Mantegna concentrates the characters from his Presentation at the Temple into a smaller space to produce a work intended for private devotion. To the left of the Virgin and Child is Saint Joseph and to the right are Saint Anne and John the Baptist. Joseph and John look directly at the viewer. The painter kept returning to the scene in various copies and variants, including one now at the Museo di Castelvecchio in Verona, one at the Musée Jacquemart-André in Paris and one at the Galleria Sabauda in Turin.
