= Giovanni Felice Ramelli =

Italian painter

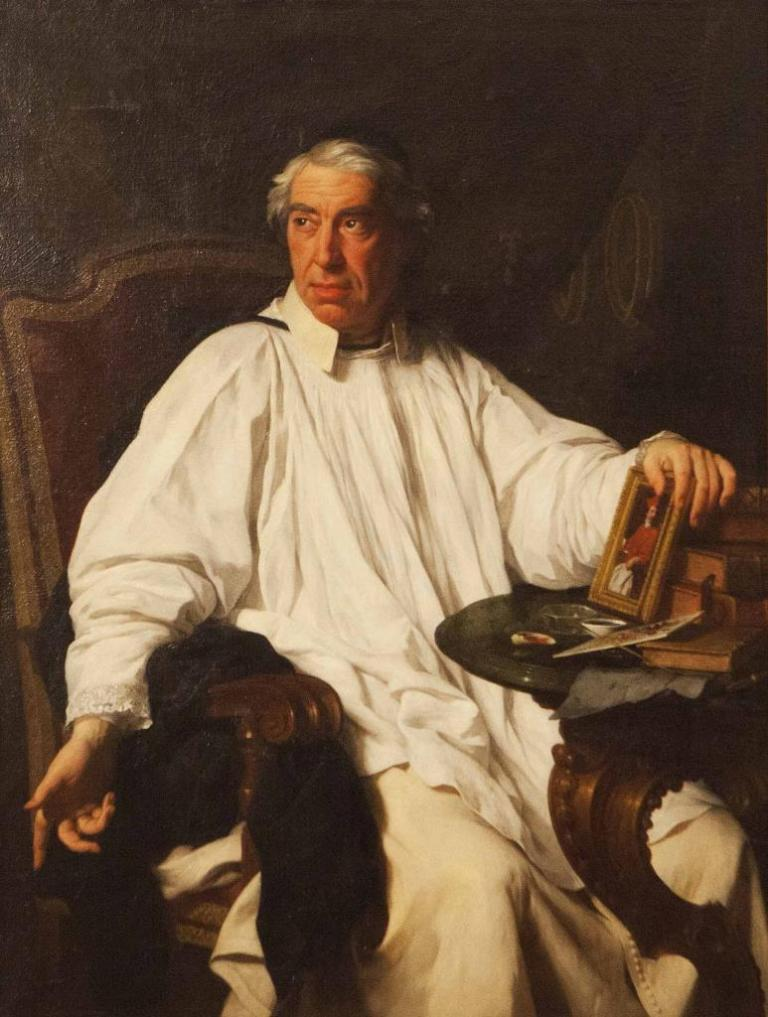

Giovanni Felice Ramelli (1666–1740) was an Italian painter of the Baroque period, active mainly in Rome. He also became an abbot of the Augustinian order of Canons Regular of the Lateran.

== Biography ==
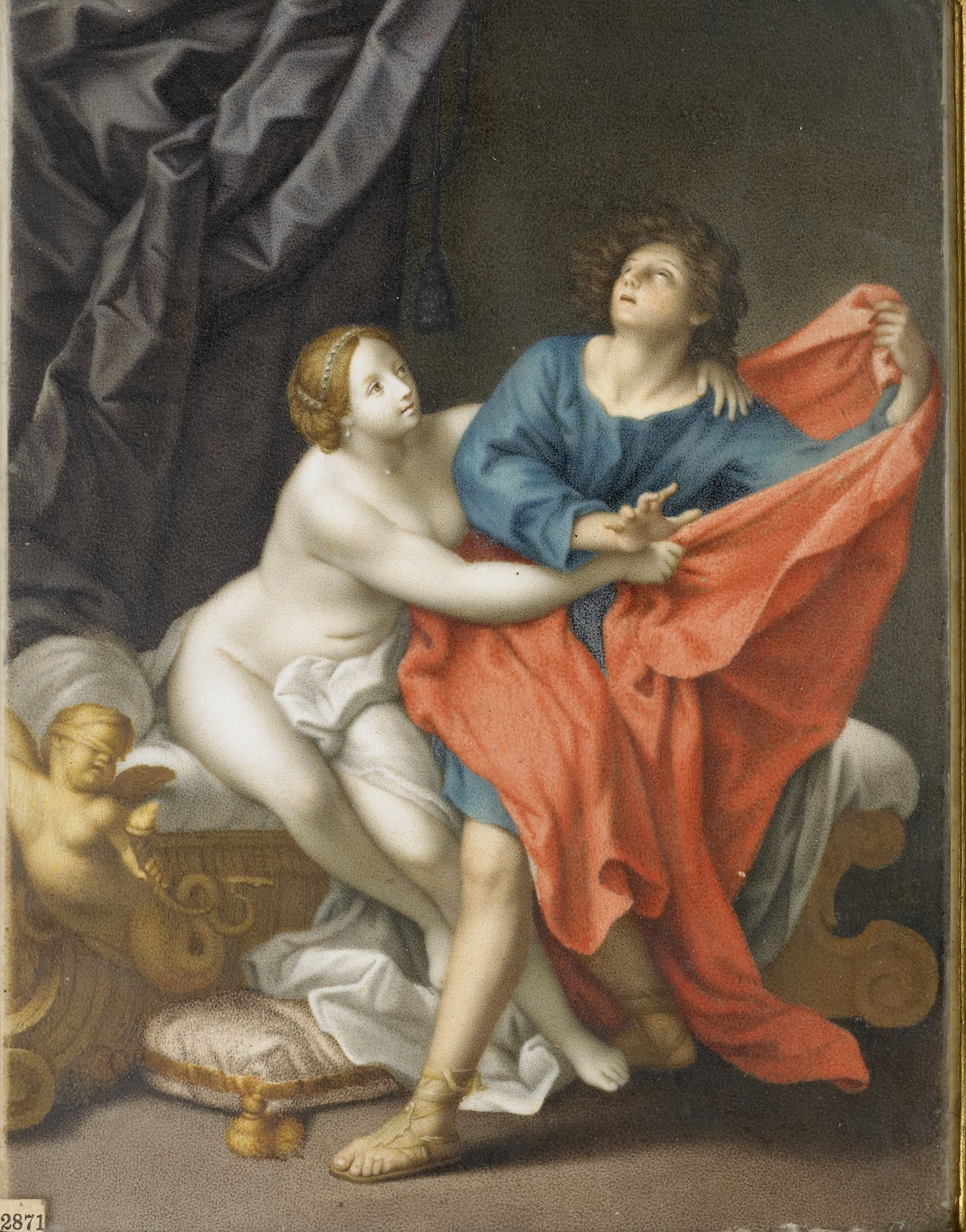
Joseph and Potiphar's Wife (miniature by Giovanni Felice Ramelli in the Rijksmuseum Amsterdam).

He was born in Asti in the Piedmont. He became a monk in the abbey of Santa Andrea in Vercelli; then moved to the abbey of San Pietro, Gattinara. In 1707, he was named abbott of Santa Maria Nova of Asti. He initially trained in Vercelli with the monk Danese Rho, a manuscript illuminator. He was master at reproducing miniature copies of the works of the pastel painter Rosalba Carriera and the painter Maria Felice Tibaldi, who married the painter Pierre Subleyras.

In 1717, he was called to Rome, where he was made by Pope Clement XI Albani, as abbot in perpetuity of the Augustinian St John Lateran. In Rome, he was in contact with many of the premier artists of Italy including Trevisani, Balestra, Maratta, Nicolas Vleughels, and Antonio Maria Zanetti. Due his role in the Vatican library and to his proximity to the Pope, Ramelli was able to arrange a commission from Daniel Seiter to engrave in copper plates the famed Byzantine Menologion of Basil II. In 1739, Abbot Ramelli commissioned Subleyras' canvas depicting Christ in the House of Simon for the church of Santa Maria Nuova in Asti. Also in 1739, he helped induct Subleyras into Academy of St Luke, of which he was a member since 1722 as Academic of Merit. Subleyras painted Ramelli's portrait circa 1735.

Ramelli excelled in portrait miniatures. In the Gallery of Bologna, there are miniatures of Guido Reni, Lorenzo Pasinelli, Giovanni Gioseffo Dal Sole; while in Dresden is a female portrait. In the Riksmuseum of Amsterdam, there is a miniature of Joseph and Potiphar by Carlo Cignani. The Palazzo Graziani in Pesaro has a miniature painting of a Shepherd with dead game, while at the University of Padua is a miniature of the Virgin and Child. The King of Sardinia invited Ramelli to his court, where he was for some time employed in painting the portraits of the most celebrated painters, many of which he copied from the originals, painted by themselves, in the Florentine Gallery (now Uffizi).

He died in Rome and was buried in 1941 Santa Maria della Pace.
