= Galleria Sabauda =

Coordinates: 45.07405°N 7.68612°E

Savoy Gallery
- Galleria Sabauda
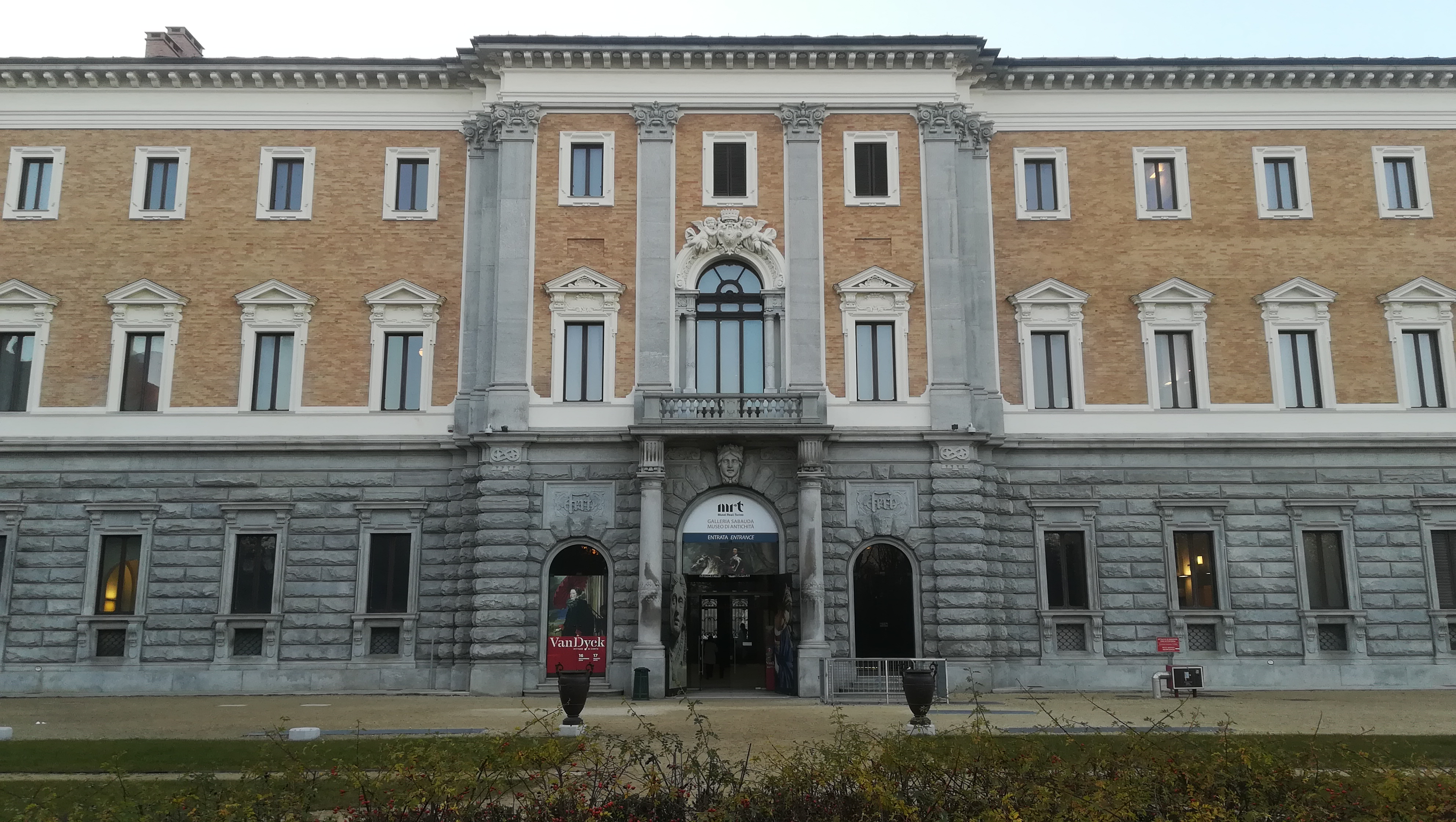
- The new headquarters
- Former name: Royal Gallery
- Established: 2 October 1833
- Location: Via XX Settembre, 86; 10122 Turin, Italy
- Type: Art museum, historic site
- Visitors: 515,632 (2018)
- Founder: Charles Albert of Sardinia
- Director: Annamaria Bava
- Website: www.museireali.beniculturali.it/en/savoy-gallery/

The Savoy Gallery (Italian: Galleria Sabauda) is an art collection in the Italian city of Turin, which contains the royal art collections amassed by the House of Savoy over the centuries. It is located on Via XX Settembre, 86.

The museum, whose first directors were Roberto and Massimo d'Azeglio, unites the art collection of Eugene of Savoy, acquired after his death by his cousin, the king of Sardinia, with the works from the Royal Palace of Turin, the picture gallery of the Savoy-Carignano, and the artworks from the Palazzo Durazzo in Genoa, acquired in 1824.

On 2 October 1832 (his birthday), King Charles Albert of Savoy inaugurated the royal gallery at the Palazzo Madama, containing 365 paintings. In 1865, Massimo d'Azeglio had the collection transferred to Guarino Guarini's Palazzo dell'Accademia delle Scienze (1679) where it stood until 2012 before it was moved to the current location.

On 4 December 2014, in the presence of the Italian minister of culture, the "Manica Nuova" of Palazzo Reale (New Wing of the Royal Palace) was officially opened. The collection has now found its final place to be exhibited. The gallery is based on a brand new museum project conceived and developed by the superintendent Edith Gabrielli (for the scientific part) together with Studio Albini Associati (staging). The lighting is by CastagnaRavelli Studio, based in Milan; the graphics are by Noorda Design.

== Collection ==
The collection includes works by Netherlandish artists such as Gerrit Dou, Jan van Eyck, Rogier van der Weyden (side panels of the Annunciation Triptych), Jan van Huchtenburg, Hans Memling (Scenes from the Passion of Christ), Rembrandt, and Anthony van Dyck (Portrait of the Three Eldest Children of Charles I), as well as paintings by Italian artists such as Duccio di Buoninsegna (Gualino Madonna), Macrino d'Alba, Sandro Botticelli, Filippino Lippi (Three Angels and Young Tobias), Bernardo Daddi, Fra Angelico, Piero del Pollaiuolo, Agnolo Bronzino, Bernardo Bellotto, Giovanni Canavesio, Orazio Gentileschi (Annunciation), Andrea Mantegna, Girolamo Savoldo, Giovanni Battista Tiepolo, Gaudenzio and Defendente Ferrari, Giovanni Bellini, Guercino, Francesco Cairo, Sebastiano Ricci, Giovanni Martino Spanzotti, Titian, Paolo Veronese, and Tintoretto, and the Frenchman Pierre Subleyras.

== Selected highlights ==
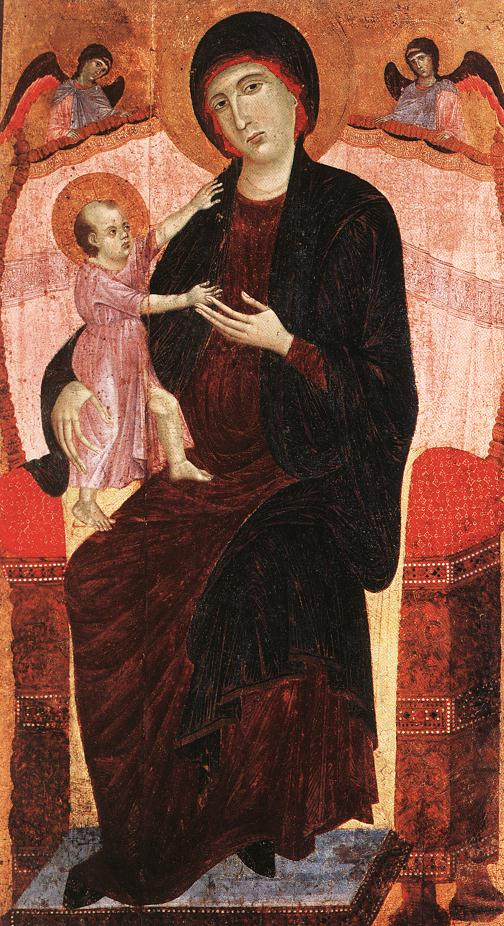
Duccio di Buoninsegna,
Gualino Madonna, c. 1285,
157 × 86 cm

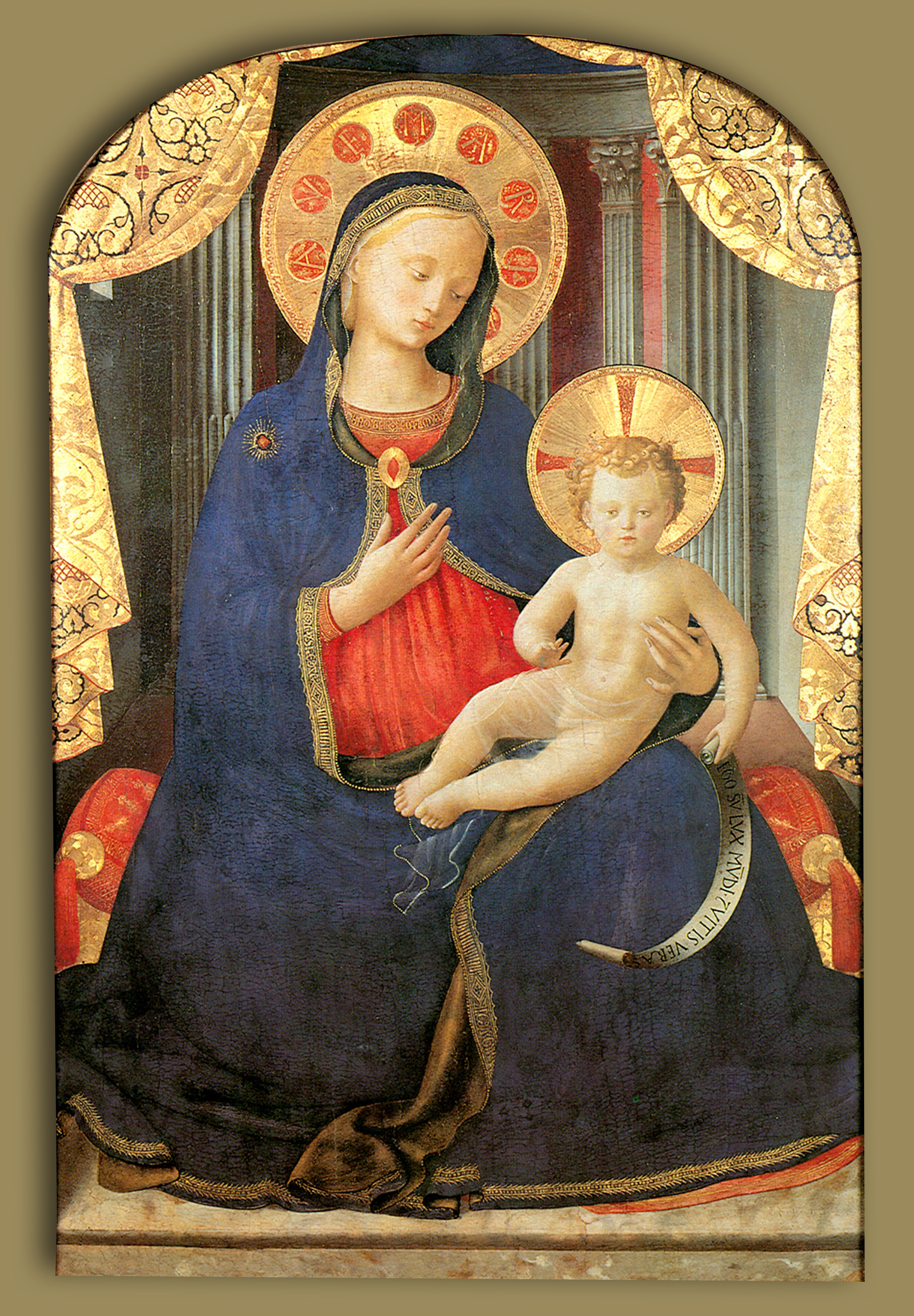
Fra Angelico,
Madonna and Child, c. 1430,
63 × 47 cm

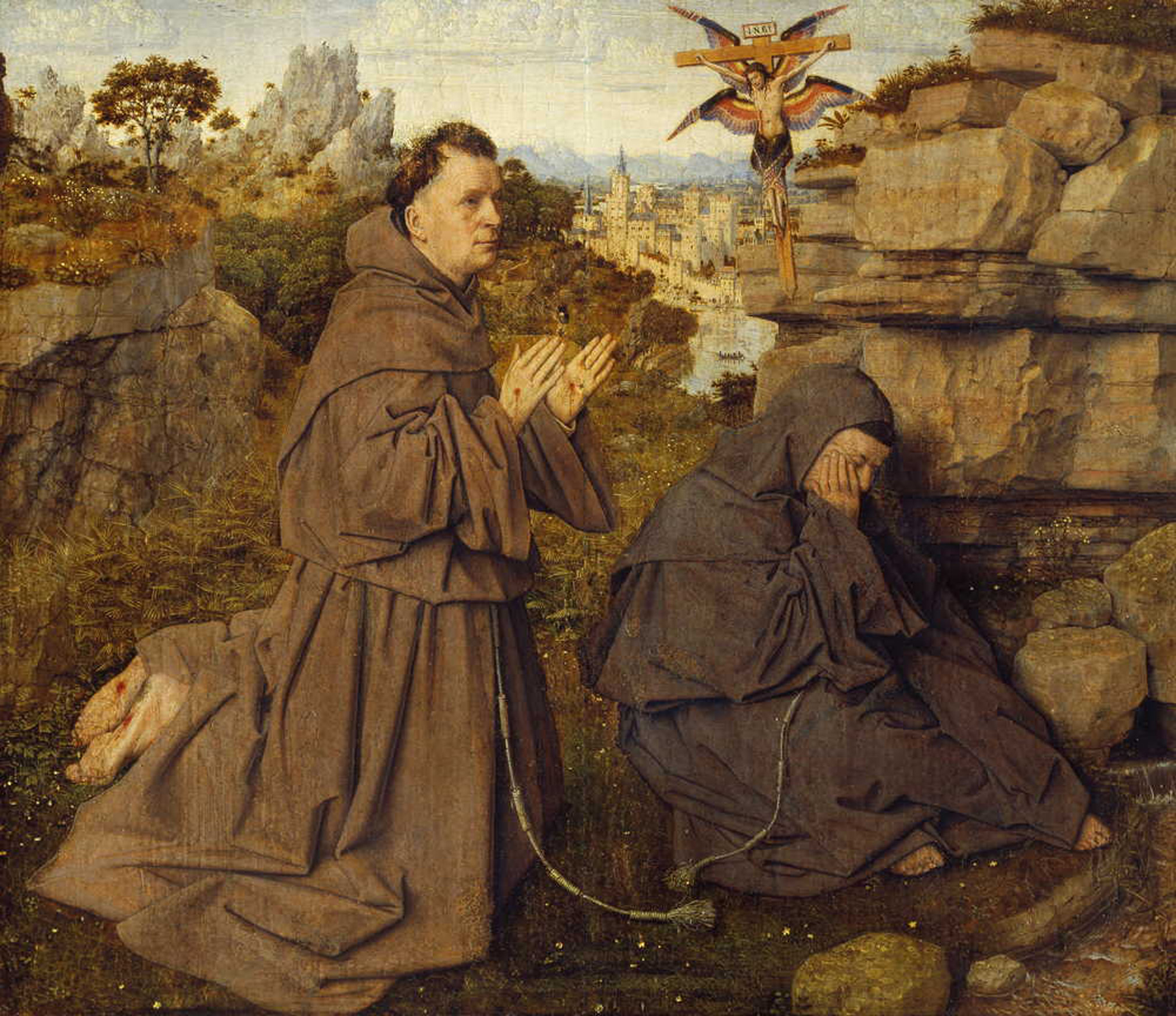
Jan van Eyck,
Stigmata of Saint Francis, c. 1432

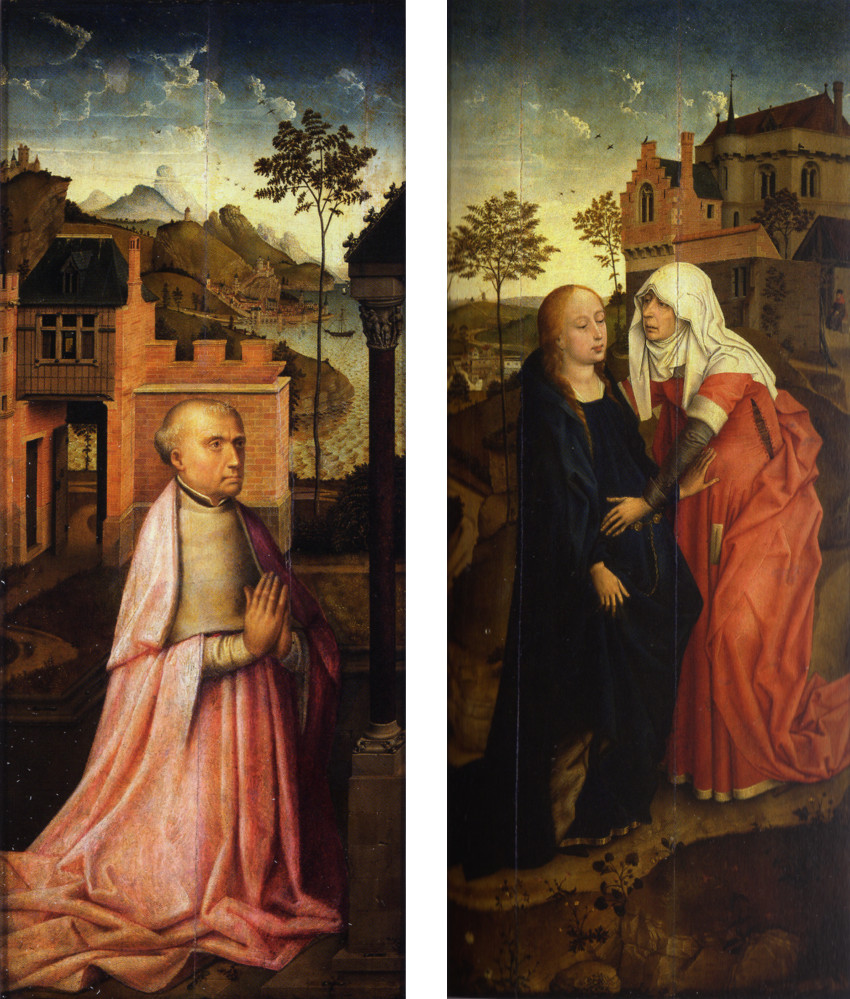
Rogier van der Weyden,
Annunciation Triptych (wings), c. 1434

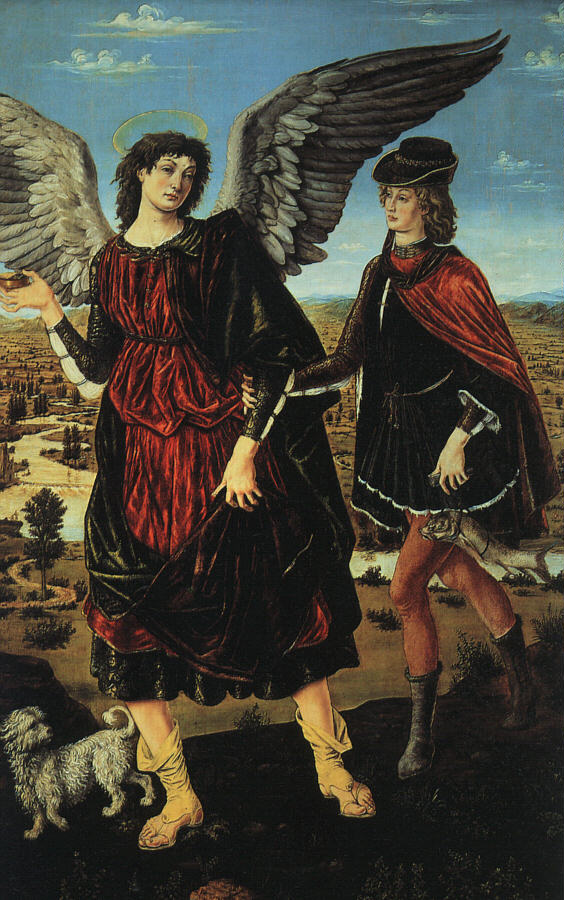
Antonio del Pollaiuolo,
Tobias and the Angel, c. 1460

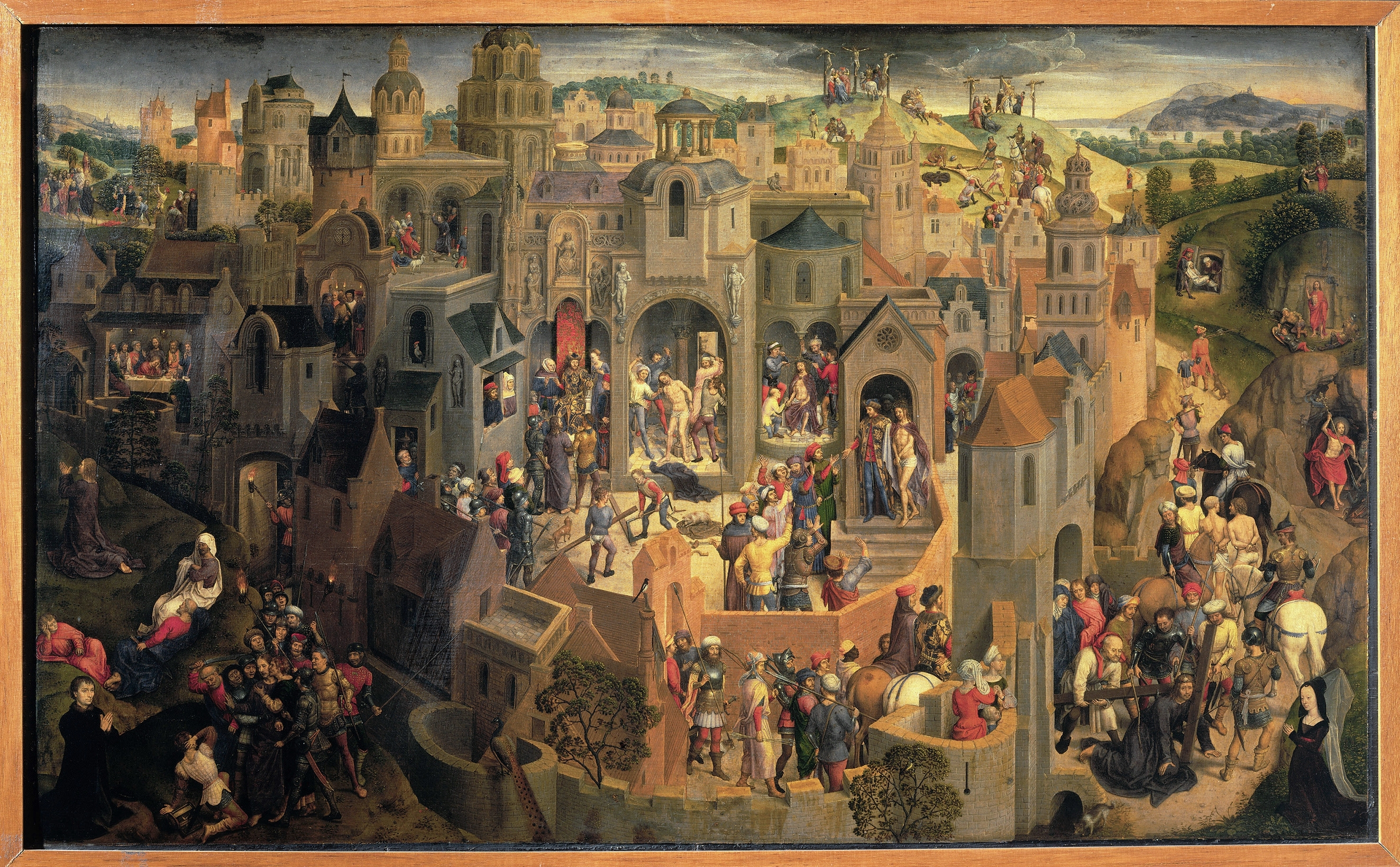
Hans Memling,
Passion of Christ, c. 1471,
57 × 92 cm

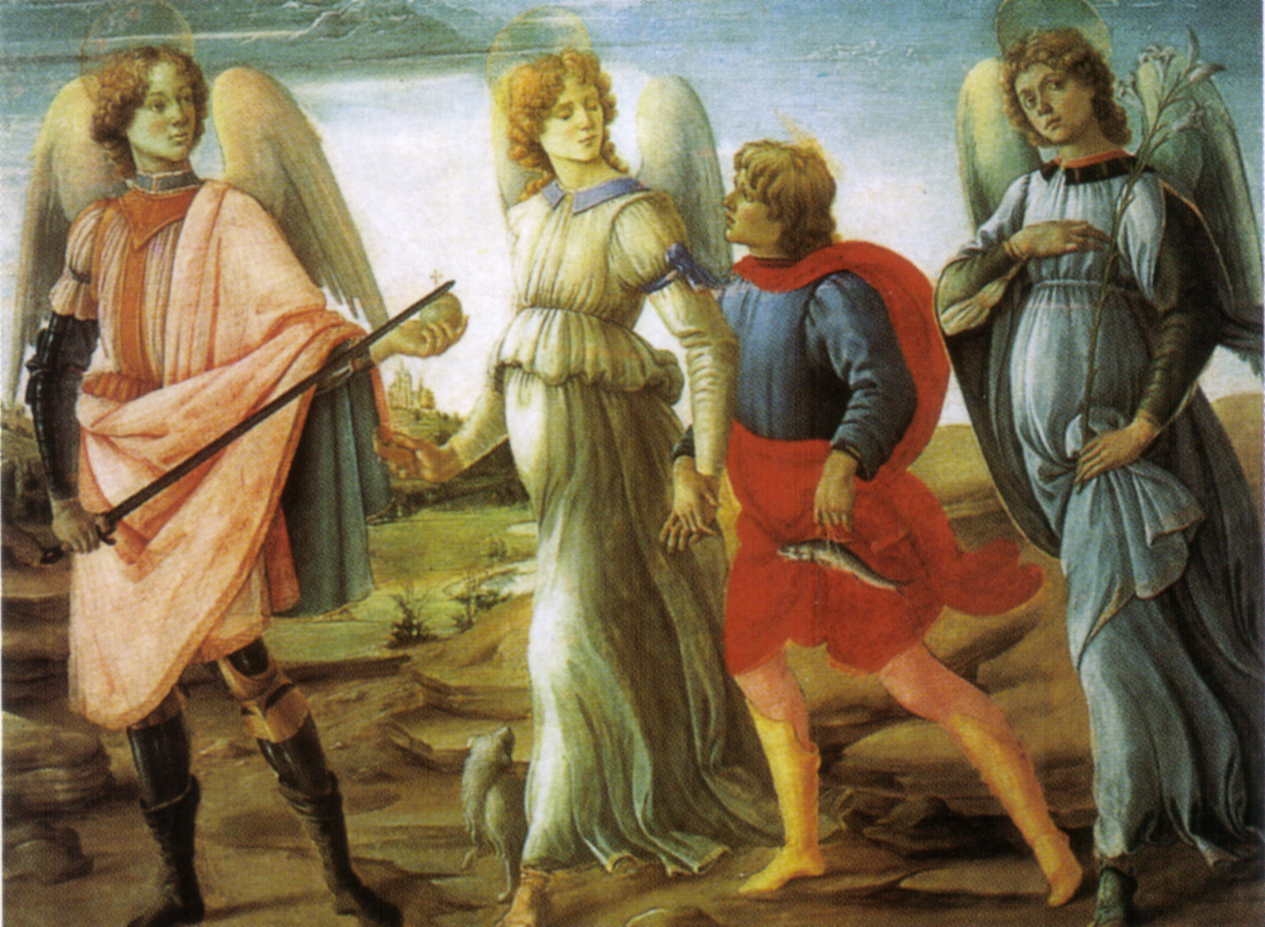
Filippino Lippi,
Tobias and the Archangels, c. 1485

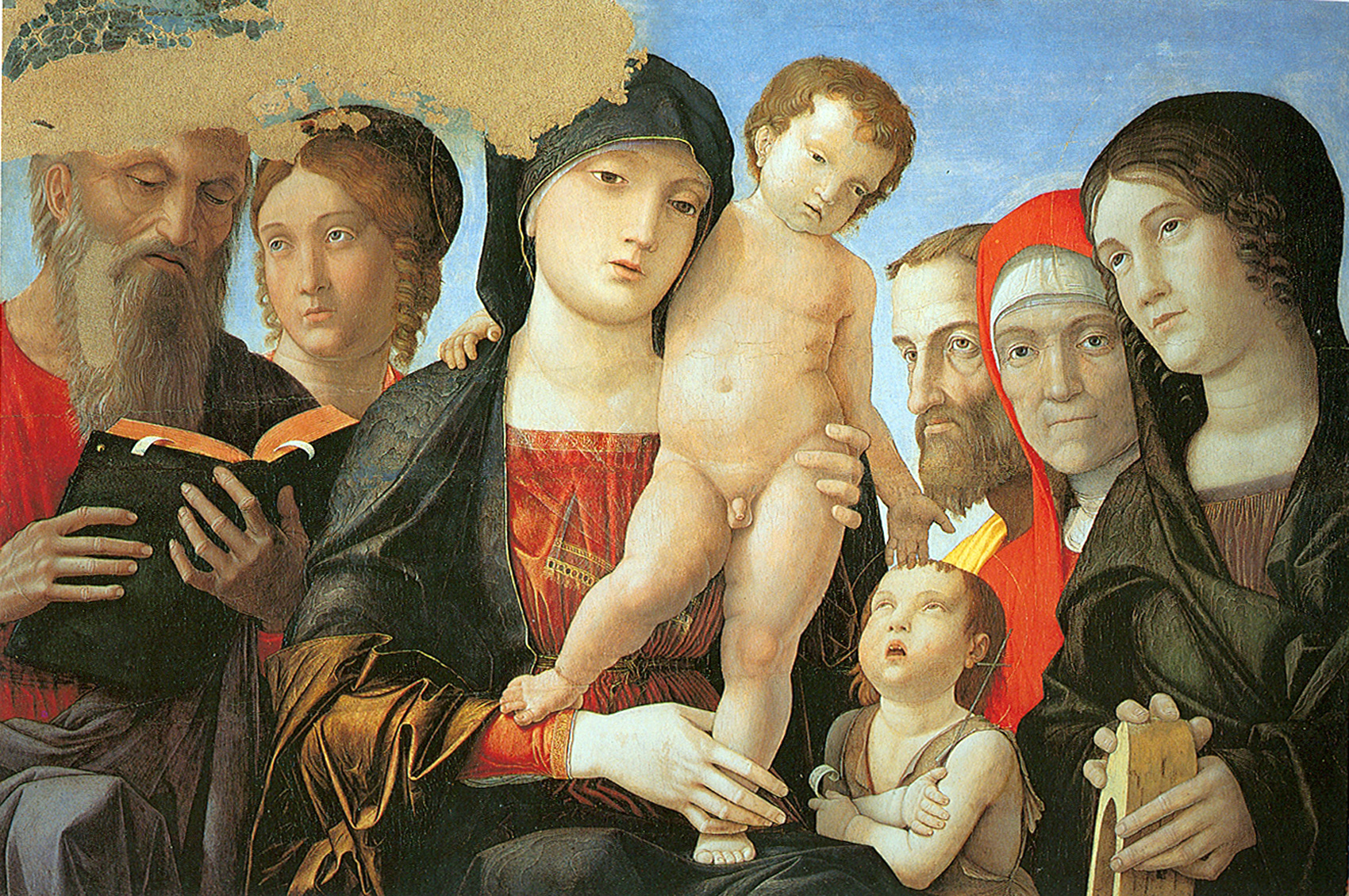
Andrea Mantegna,
Madonna and Child with Saints, c. 1500,
61.5 × 87.5 cm

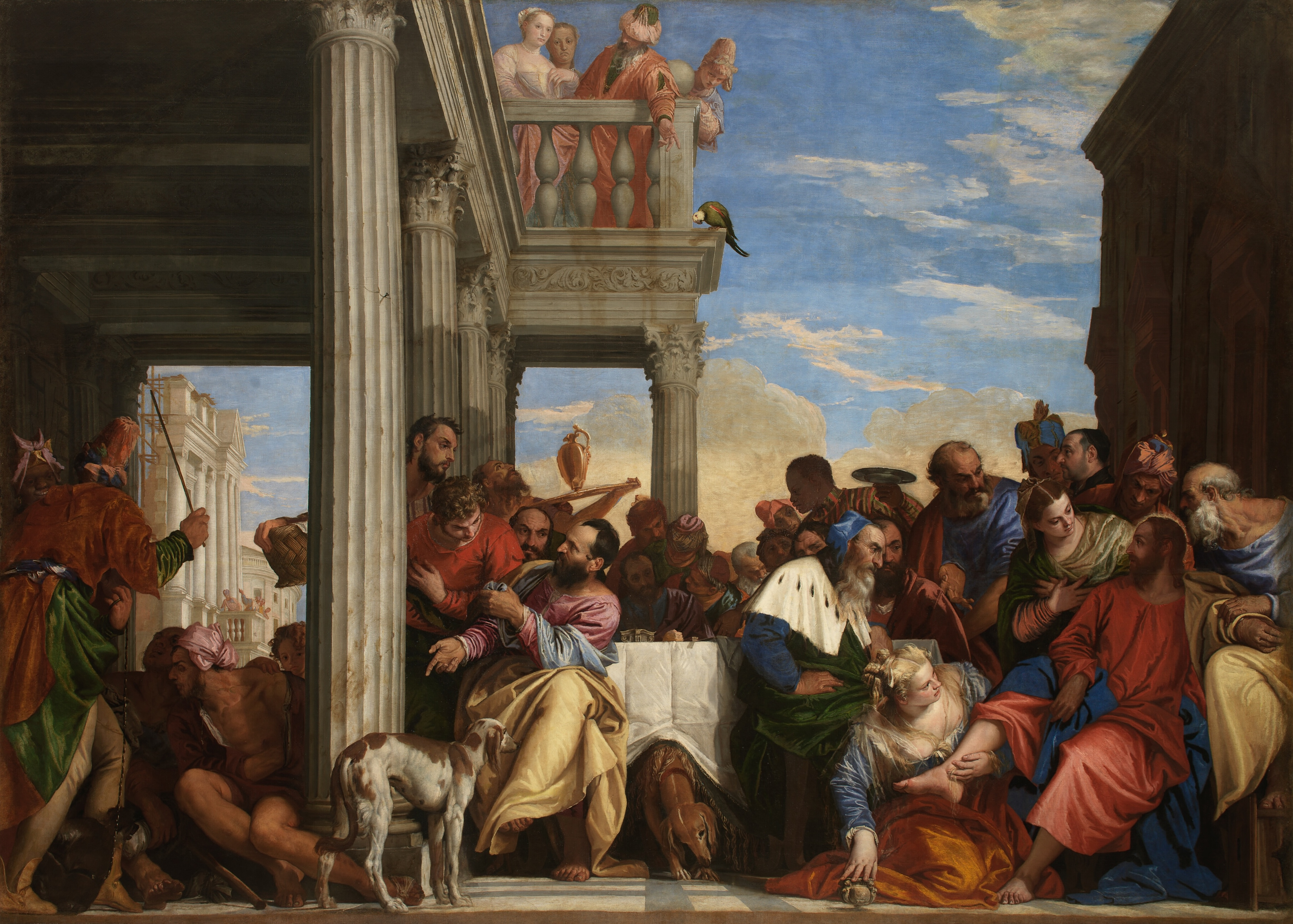
Paolo Veronese,
Feast in the House of Simon, c. 1560,
315 × 451 cm

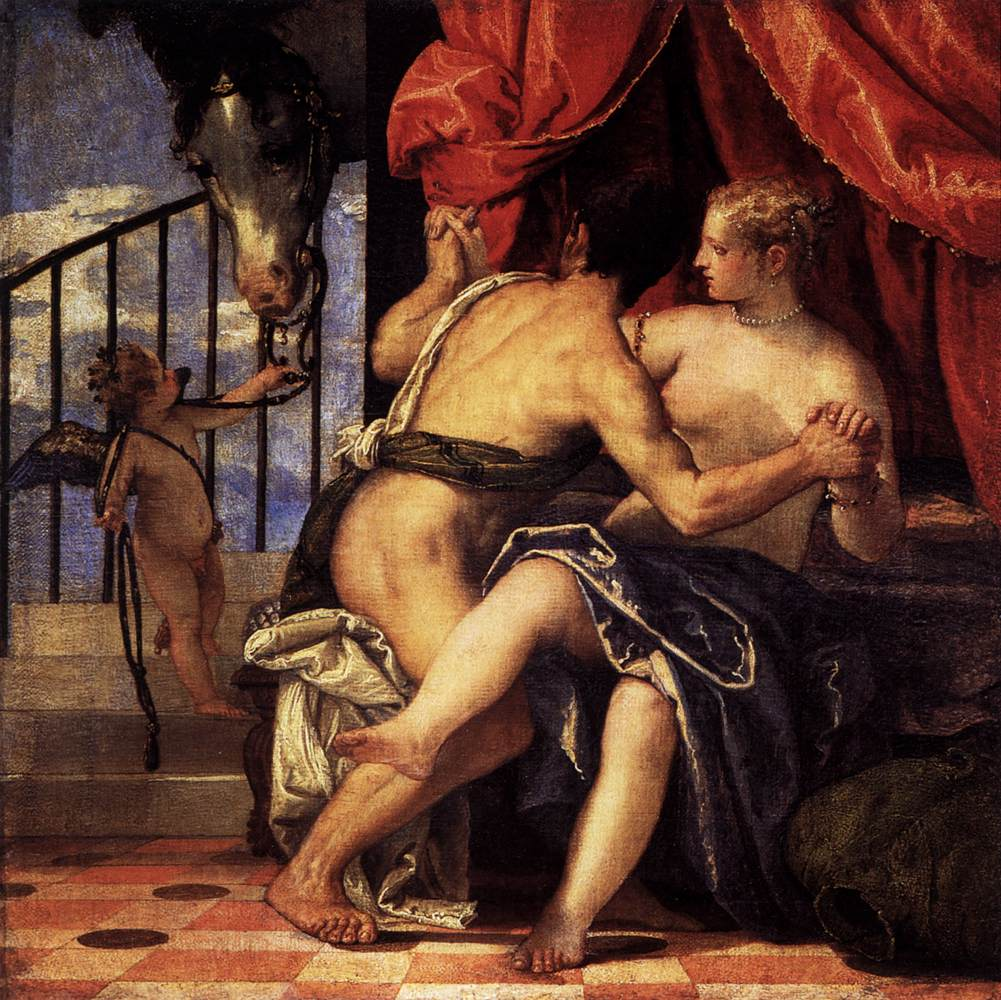
Paolo Veronese,
Mars and Venus c. 1570,
47 × 47 cm

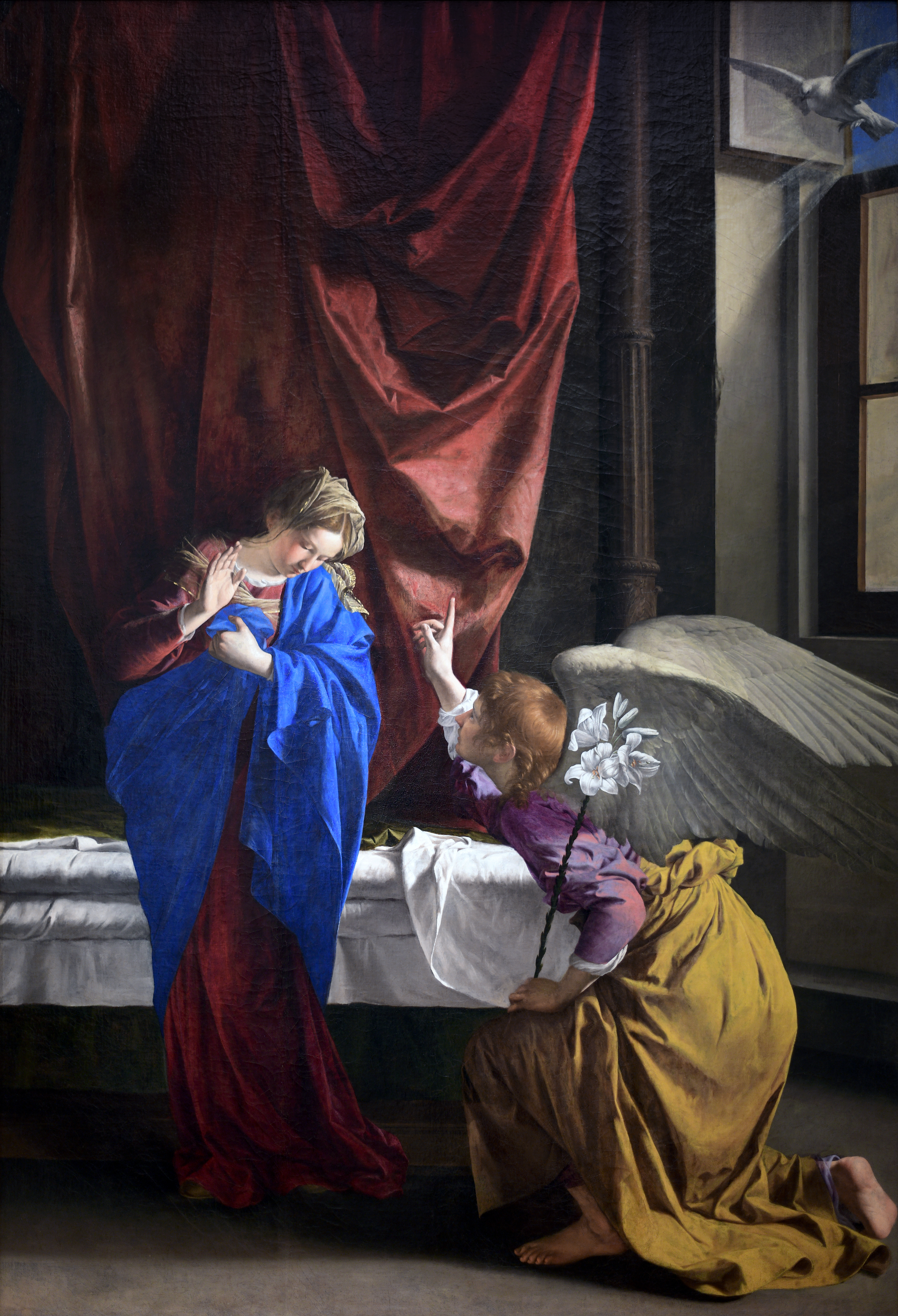
Orazio Gentileschi,
Annunciation, c. 1623,
286 × 196 cm

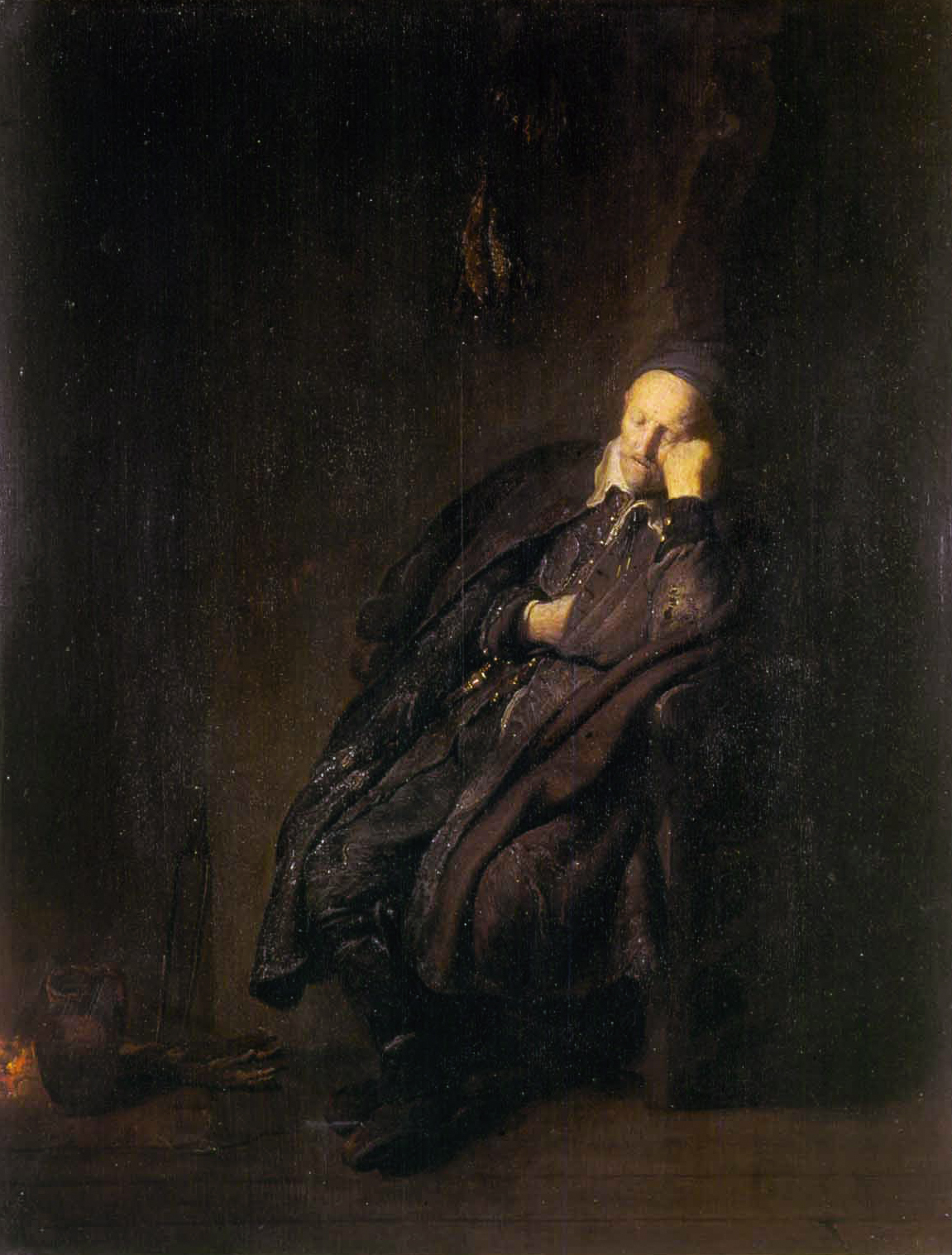
Rembrandt,
Old Man Sleeping by a Fire, c. 1629,
52 × 41 cm

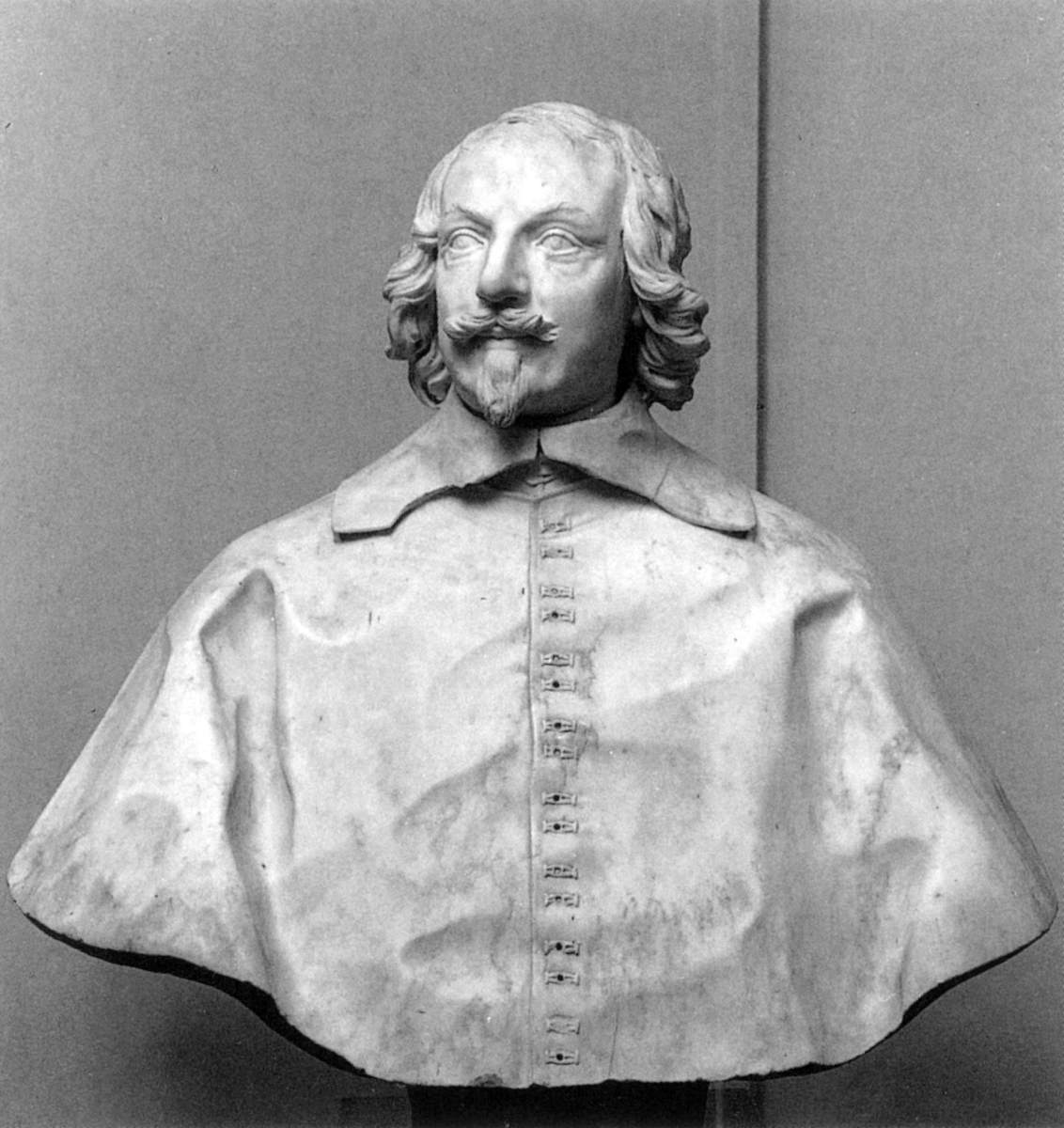
François Duquesnoy,
Cardinal Maurizio of Savoy, 1636,
86.5 cm
