= Bust of Cardinal Maurizio of Savoy =

Coordinates: 45.07405°N 7.68612°E

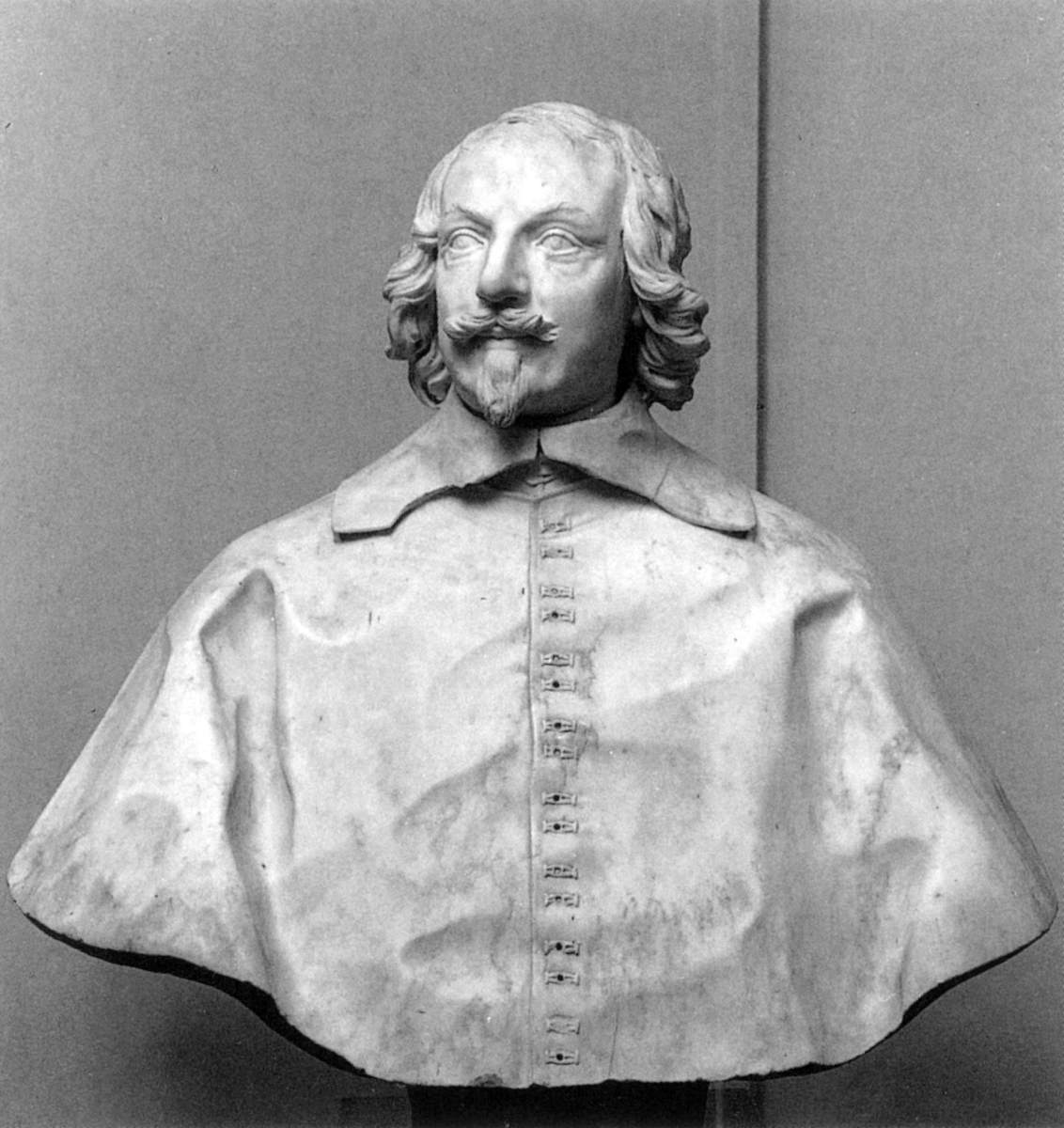
- Artist: François Duquesnoy
- Year: 1635
- Catalogue: 772
- Type: Sculpture
- Medium: Marble
- Subject: Cardinal Maurizio of Savoy
- Dimensions: 86.5 cm (34 in)
- Location: Galleria Sabauda, Turin

The Bust of Cardinal Maurizio of Savoy is a marble portrait bust by the Flemish sculptor François Duquesnoy. The sculpture was completed in 1635. It portrays Maurice of Savoy, of whom Duquesnoy became a "well-favored" in the 1630s. The bust is the final documented portrait by Duquesnoy. It is currently housed at the Galleria Sabauda in Turin.

== Sculpture ==
The bust is indicative of a close collaboration between artist and commissioner, which lends credit to Gian Pietro Bellori's claim that Duquesnoy "became well-favored" by Maurizio. Bellori, one of Duquesnoy's biographers, made it a point that the bust (and Duquesnoy's final known portrait) was realized in 1635. Bellori wrote about the work: "Prince Maurizio, Cardinal of Savoy, made in marble in the year 1635." Bellori added that Duquesnoy had "won great favor with this nobleman." The Cardinal possibly was the only patron who managed to obtain Duquesnoy's services in the mid-1630s, when Duquesnoy's health was in steep decline.

In the 1630s, Duquesnoy suffered from gout, attacks of vertigo and depression, which would debilitate him until his untimely death in 1643. Duquesnoy's poor health affected his productivity, which had been drastically decreasing since the early 1630s. This accounts, for example, for the delays in the completion of his Saint Susanna and in his payment for the same work. Bellori reports that while installing the Saint Susanna's metal palm, Duquesnoy had an attack of vertigo, fell from the ladder, and almost lost his life.

Cardinal Maurizio might have opted for Duquesnoy after seeing the sculptor's Nano di Créqui. At the time, the Duke of Créqui was commanding his troops in Northern Italy as an ally of Victor Amadeus I, Duke of Savoy. The accurate rendering of facial hair is similar in the two sculptures, with a degree of finesse seldom seen in sculptures of high-ranking individuals of the day. According to Estelle Lingo, "Maurizio may have seen in this highly refined carving something akin to Van Dyck's ability to endow his sitters with a noble elegance conveyed by the paintstrokes themselves".
