= Lorenzo Ranelli =

Italian footballer

Personal information
- Date of birth: 5 June 1996 (age 30)
- Place of birth: Colleferro, Italy
- Height: 1.78 m (5 ft 10 in)
- Position: Midfielder

Team information
- Current team: Sanremese
- Number: 16

Youth career
- –2014: Frosinone
- 2013–2014: → Pescara (loan)

Senior career*
Years	Team	Apps	(Gls)
2014–2016	Frosinone	1	(0)
2016–2018	L'Aquila	21	(2)
2018–2019	Campobasso	23	(1)
2019–2021	Legnago Salus	29	(2)
2021–2022	Lornano Badesse	26	(2)
2022–2023	Carpi	29	(1)
2023	Aglianese	8	(0)
2023–2024	Desenzano	8	(0)
2024–	Sanremese	8	(0)
- * Club domestic league appearances and goals as of 10 November 2024

Lorenzo Ranelli (born 5 June 1996) is an Italian footballer who plays as a midfielder for Italian Serie D club Sanremese.

== Club career ==
Ranelli is a youth exponent from Frosinone. He made his Serie B debut on 22 May 2015 against Vicenza. He played the first 70 minutes of a 0–0 home draw before being substituted for Massimiliano Carlini.

On 11 August 2021 he joined to Serie D club Lornano Badesse Calcio. In July 2022, he joined Carpi.
