= Altman Madonna =

Painting by Andrea Mantegna

The Altman Madonna
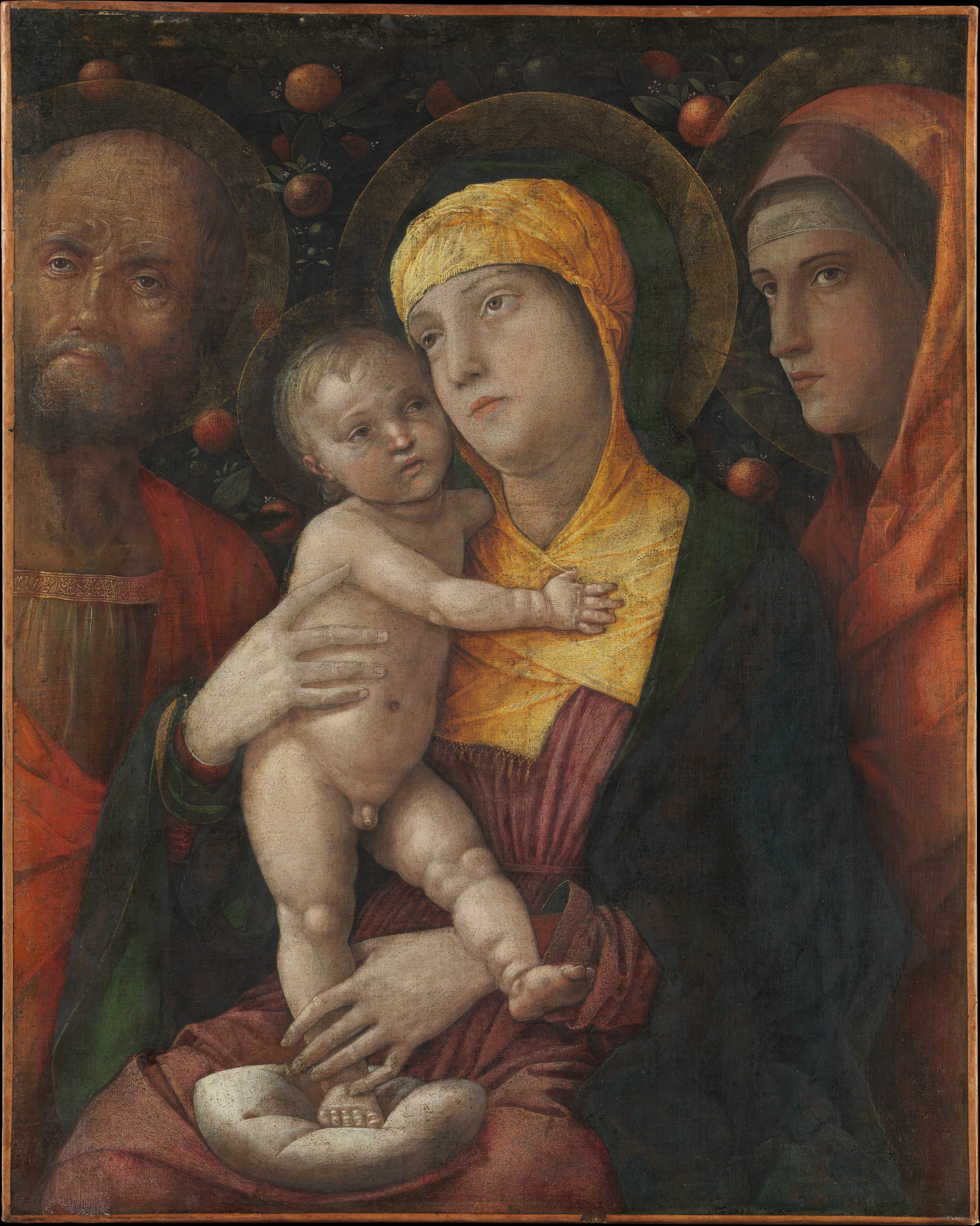
- Artist: Andrea Mantegna
- Year: 1495-1505
- Medium: glue tempera and gold on canvas
- Dimensions: 57.2 cm × 45.7 cm (22.5 in × 18.0 in)
- Location: Metropolitan Museum of Art, New York

The Altman Madonna or 'Holy Family with St Mary Magdalene is a glue-tempera and gold on canvas painting, measuring 57.2 by 45.7 cm and dating to 1495-1505. Painted by Andrea Mantegna, it is now in the Metropolitan Museum of Art in New York.

Its use of canvas and its stylistic similarities to works such as the Trivulzio Madonna date it to the painter's late period. The fruit hedge in the background recalls the Trivulzio Madonna as well as the Madonna della Vittoria. It may have been the work seen in the Ospedale degli Incurabili in Venice by Marco Boschini and described as similar to the Holy Family with a Female Saint (Museo di Castelvecchio, Verona).

It was sold in 1902 by Agosto d'Aiuti, a Neapolitan count, to an English antiquarian in London. After passing through various owners, it was acquired in 1912 by the American collector Benjamin Altman, who bequeathed it to the Metropolitan Museum in 1913
