= Pierre Subleyras =

French painter

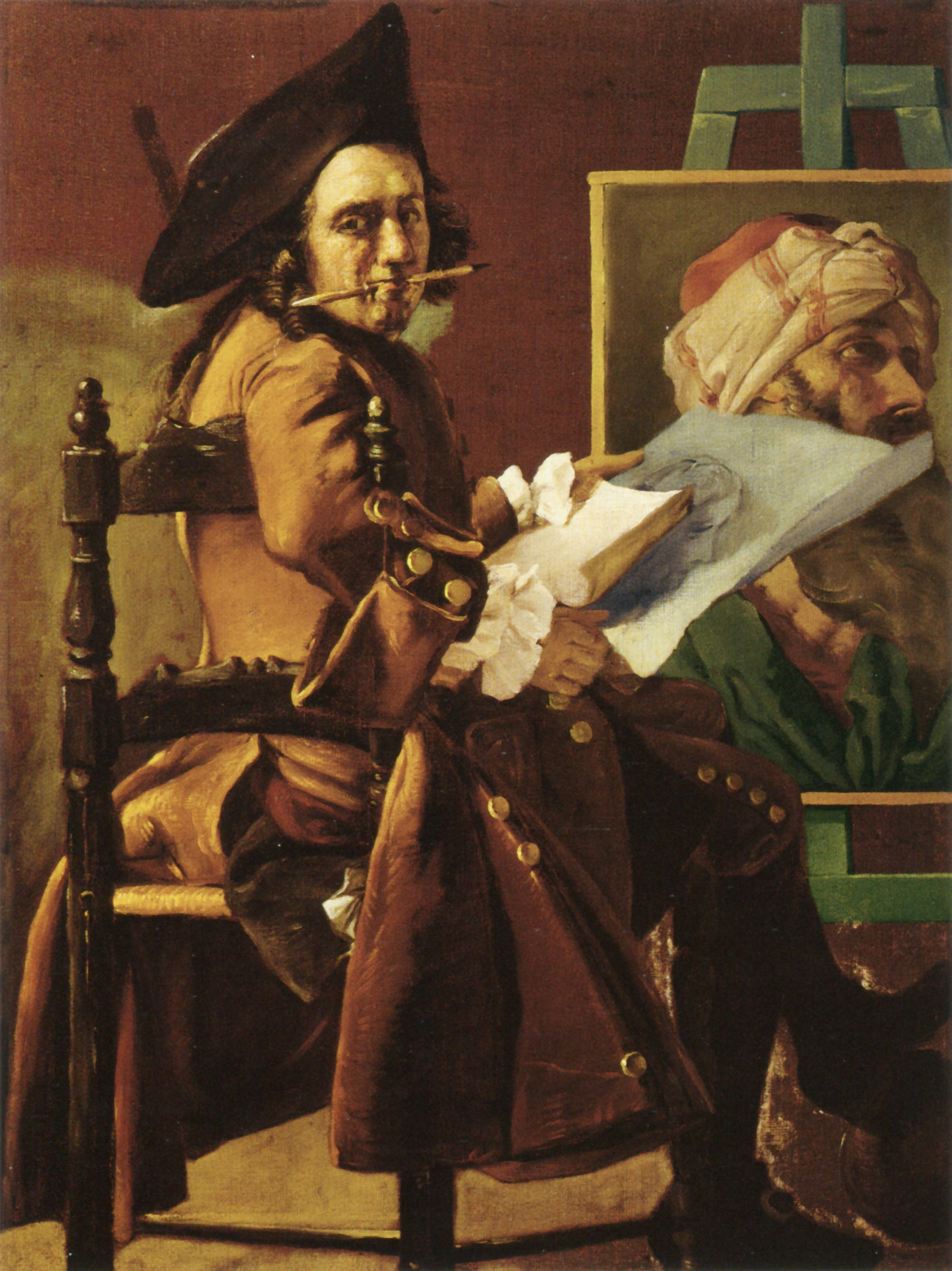
- Self-Portrait, verso of The Artist's Studio, 1746, oils, 125 by 99 cm; Academy of Fine Arts, Vienna
- Born: 25 November 1699; Saint-Gilles, Languedoc
- Died: 28 May 1749 (aged 49); Rome
- Style: Classicism
- Spouse: Maria Felice Tibaldi (m. 1739)
- Awards: Prix de Rome

Pierre Subleyras (French: [syblɛʁas]; November 25, 1699 – May 28, 1749) was a French painter, active during the late-Baroque and early-Neoclassic period, mainly in Italy.

== Life ==
Subleyras was born in Saint-Gilles-du-Gard, France. He left France in 1728, having carried off the French Academy's grand prix, which provided scholarship for study in Rome. In Rome, he painted for the Elector of Saxony, Frederick Christian, a "Christ's Visit to the House of Simon the Pharisee", (later engraved by Subleyras himself), this work procured his admission into the famed Roman artists guild, Accademia di San Luca.

Cardinal Valenti Gonzaga next obtained for him the order for Saint Basil & Emperor Valens (also known as the Mass of St. Basil, which was executed in mosaic for St Peter's. Another masterpiece is his painting of St Camillo De Lellis coming to the rescue of the diseased at the hospital of the Holy Spirit.

He was a remarkably incisive portraitist, as evident from the portrait of Pope Benedict XIV or of the obese Cardinal Silvio Valenti Gonzaga. The pope himself commanded two great paintings, the "Marriage of St Catherine" and the "Ecstasy of St Camilla", which he placed in his own private apartments. Another portrait was of the cleric and artist Giovanni Felice Ramelli, which Ramelli then replicated in miniature.

Subleyras shows greater individuality in his curious genre pictures, which he produced in considerable number (Louvre). In his illustrations of La Fontaine and Boccaccio his true relation to the modern era comes out; and his drawings from nature are often admirable (see one of a man draped in a heavy cloak in the British Museum).

Exhausted by overwork, Subleyras tried a change to Naples, but returned to Rome at the end of a few months to die. His wife, the celebrated miniature painter, Maria Felice Tibaldi, was sister to Isabella, the wife of Trémolières.

== Partial catalogue and gallery ==
=== Paintings at the Louvre ===
- Don Cesare Benvenuti
- L'Absolution de Théodose
- Le Gaucon
- L'Ermite ou Frère Luce
- Les Oies du frère Philippe
- Portrait présumé de Jacques-Antoine de Lironcourt
- Saint Benoît ressuscite un enfant
- Saint Jean d'Avila
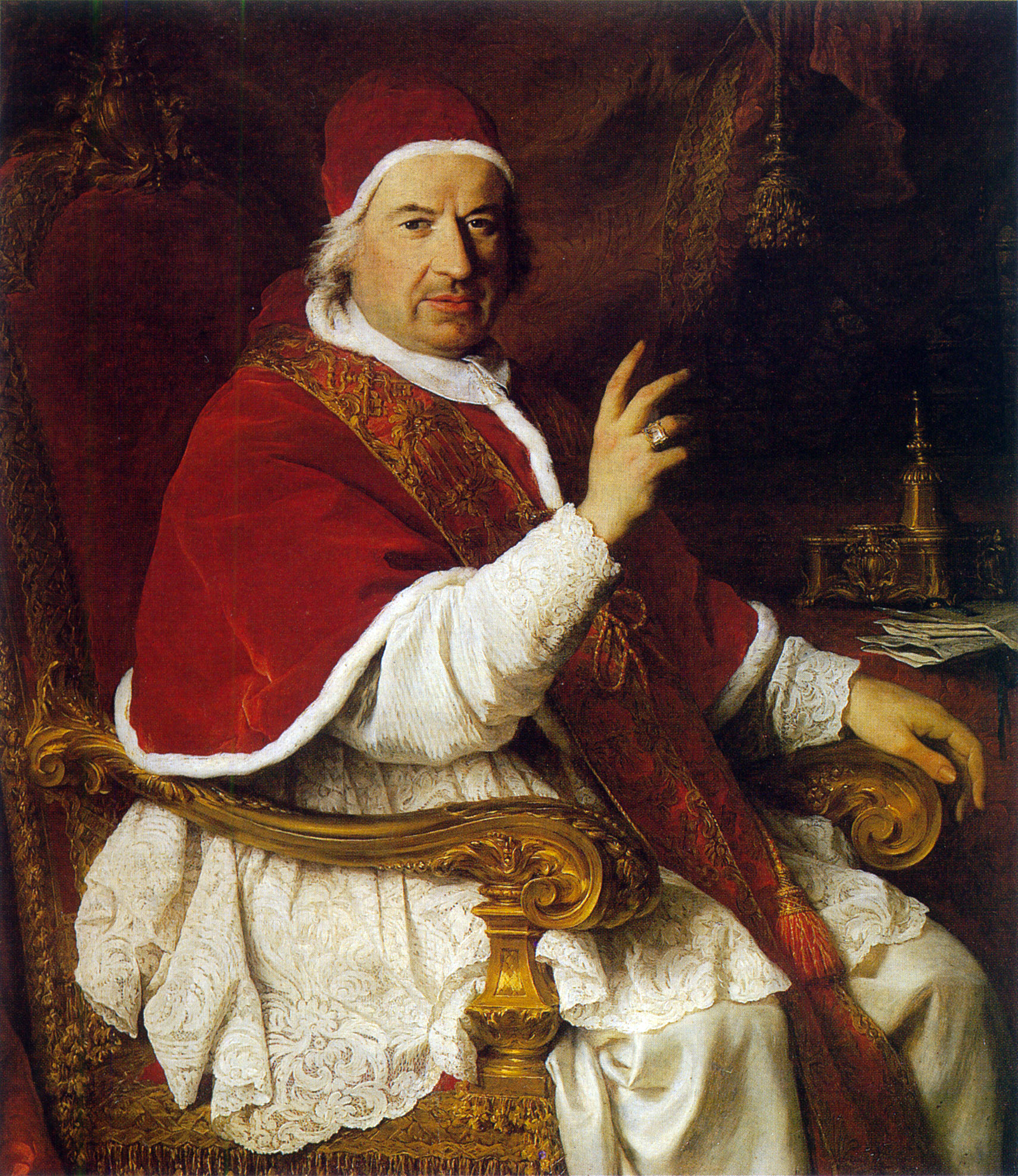
Pope Benedict XIV

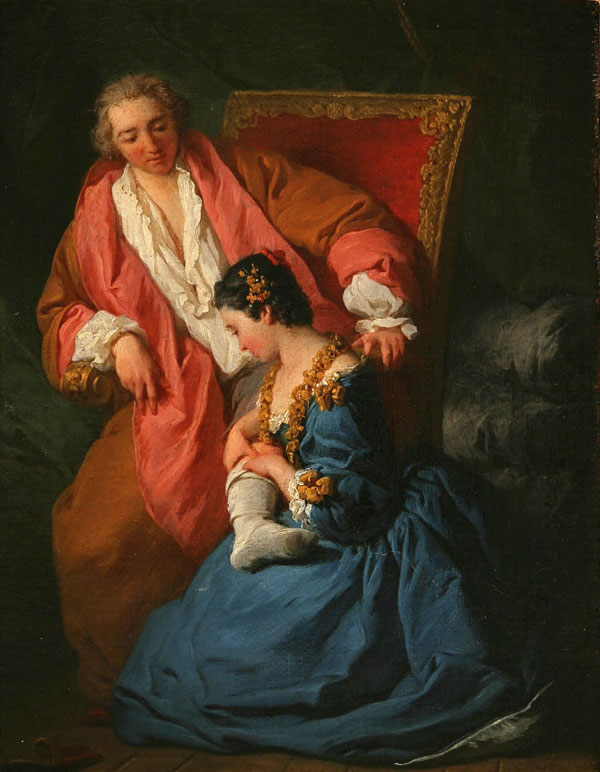
Courtesan in love

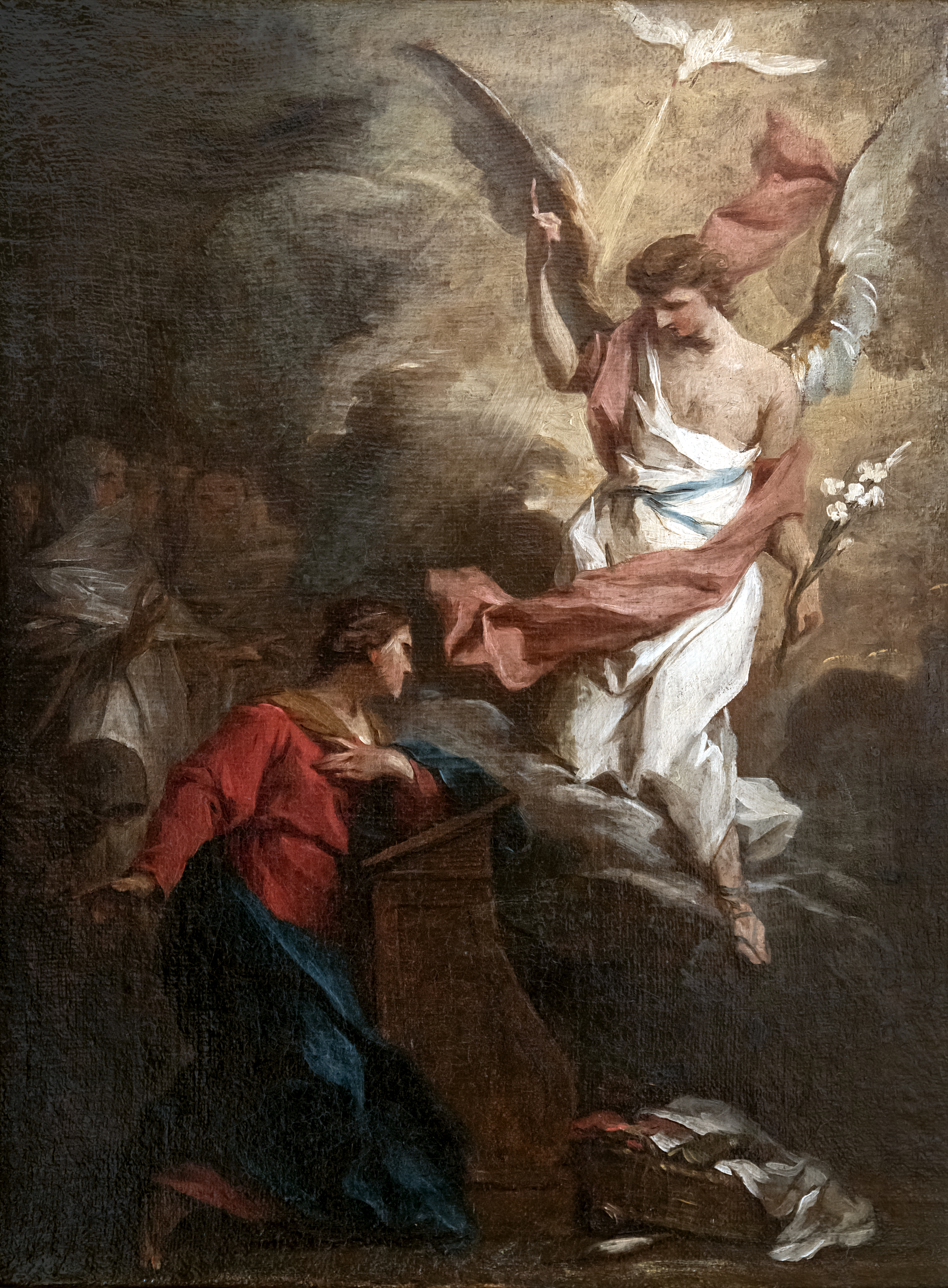
The Annunciation in the Presence of Ammantate (1726)

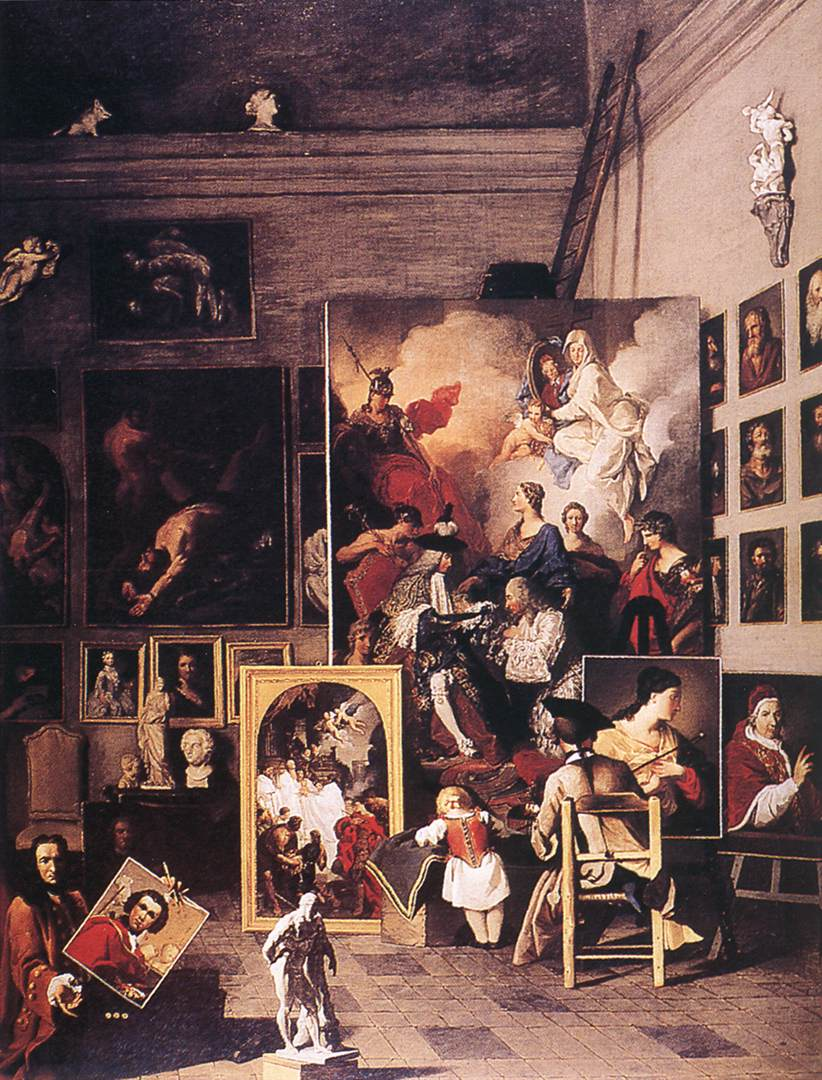
The Artist's Studio

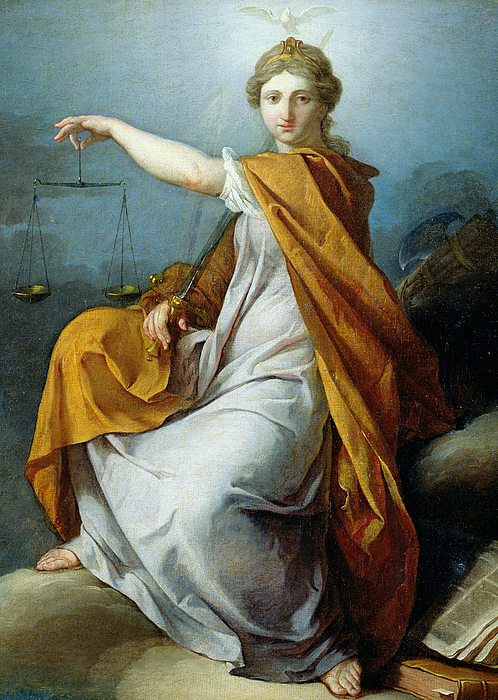
Justice

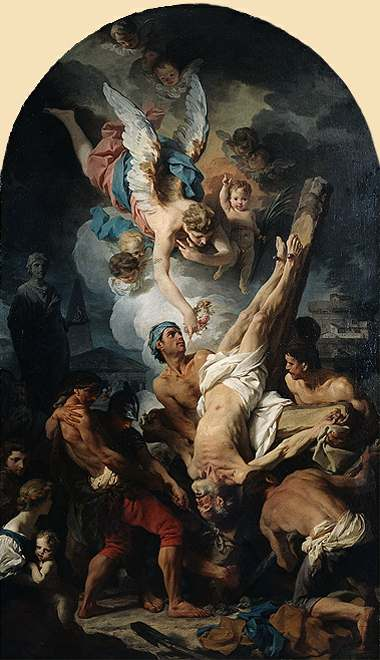
Crucifixion of Saint Peter

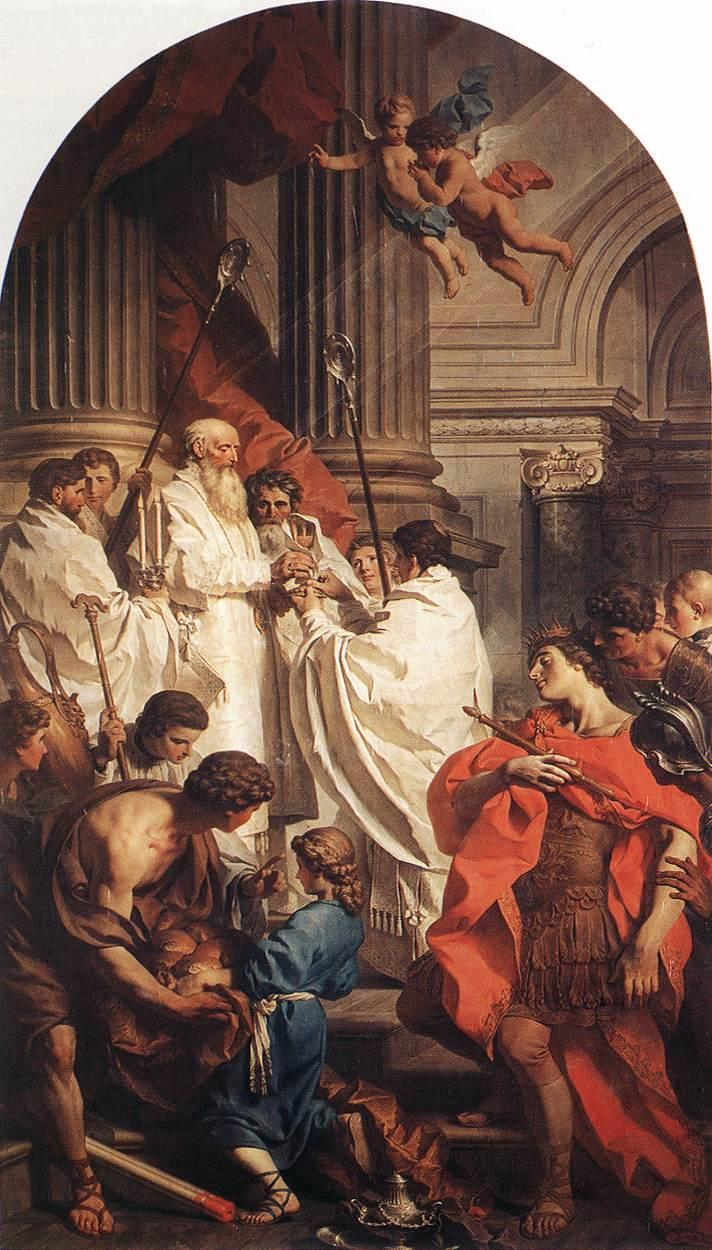
Mass of Saint Basil (1743)
