= Luca Mannelli =

Italian classicist/archbishop

Most Reverend Luca Mannelli
- Bishop of Fano
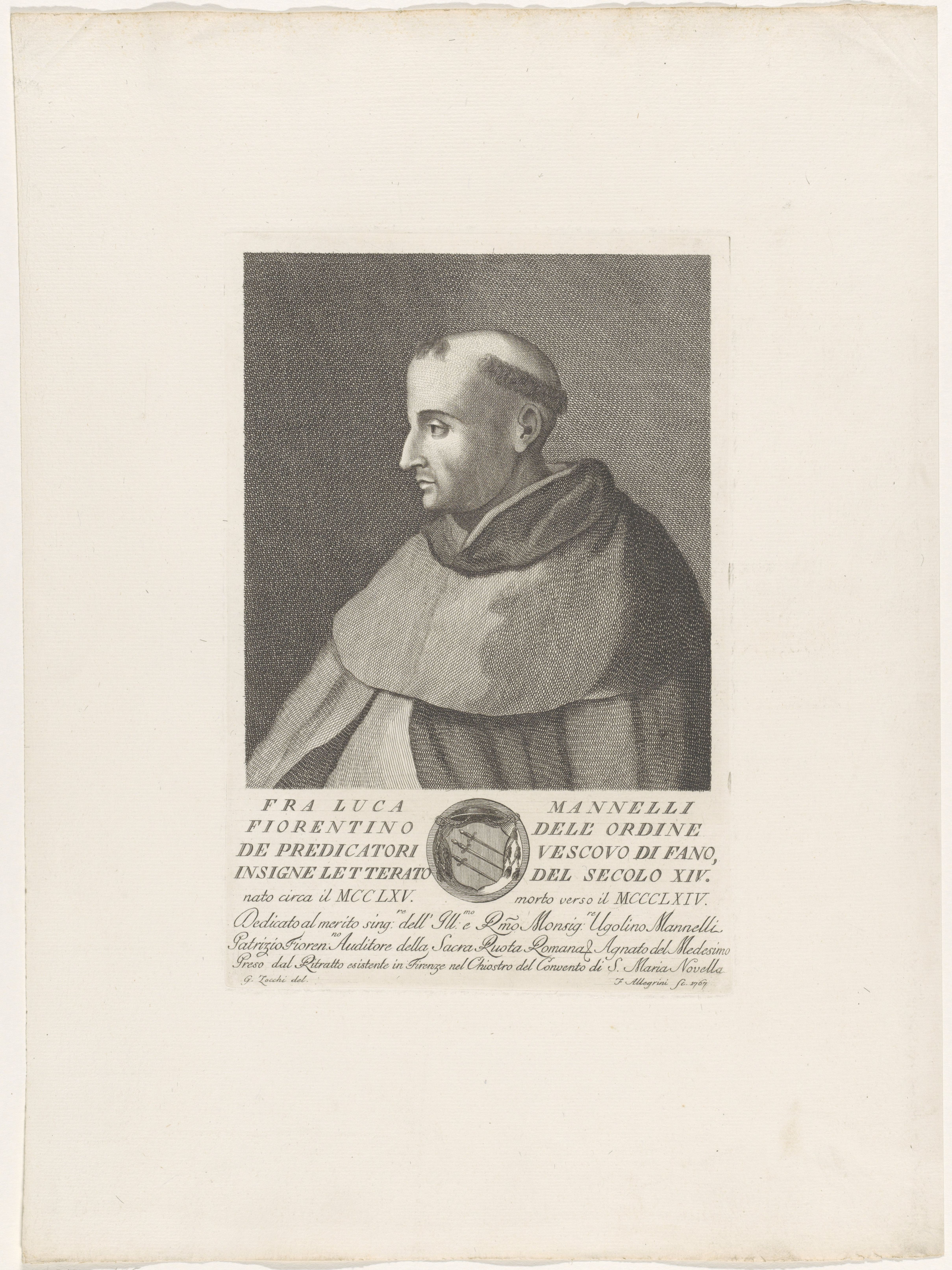
- Luca Mannelli
- Church: Catholic Church
- Predecessor: Pietro III
- Successor: Leone II
- Previous posts: Bishop of Zeitun (1344–1347); Bishop of Osimo (1347–1358)

Orders
- Consecration: 5 November 1347 by Pope Innocent VI

Personal details
- Died: 1362

Luca Mannelli (circa 1265 – 1362) was an Italian classicist and archbishop.

He was born in Florence to a prominent family. He joined the Dominican order circa 1280. His erudition brought him into the circle of Pope Clement VI in Avignon. There he published some of the epistles of Seneca and wrote a treatise on moral philosophy. He was appointed as bishop of Osimo in 1347, and later Fano in 1358, where he died.
