= San Pietro, Gattinara =

Church in the province of Vercelli, Italy

Coordinates: 45°36′57.7″N 8°22′18.0″E

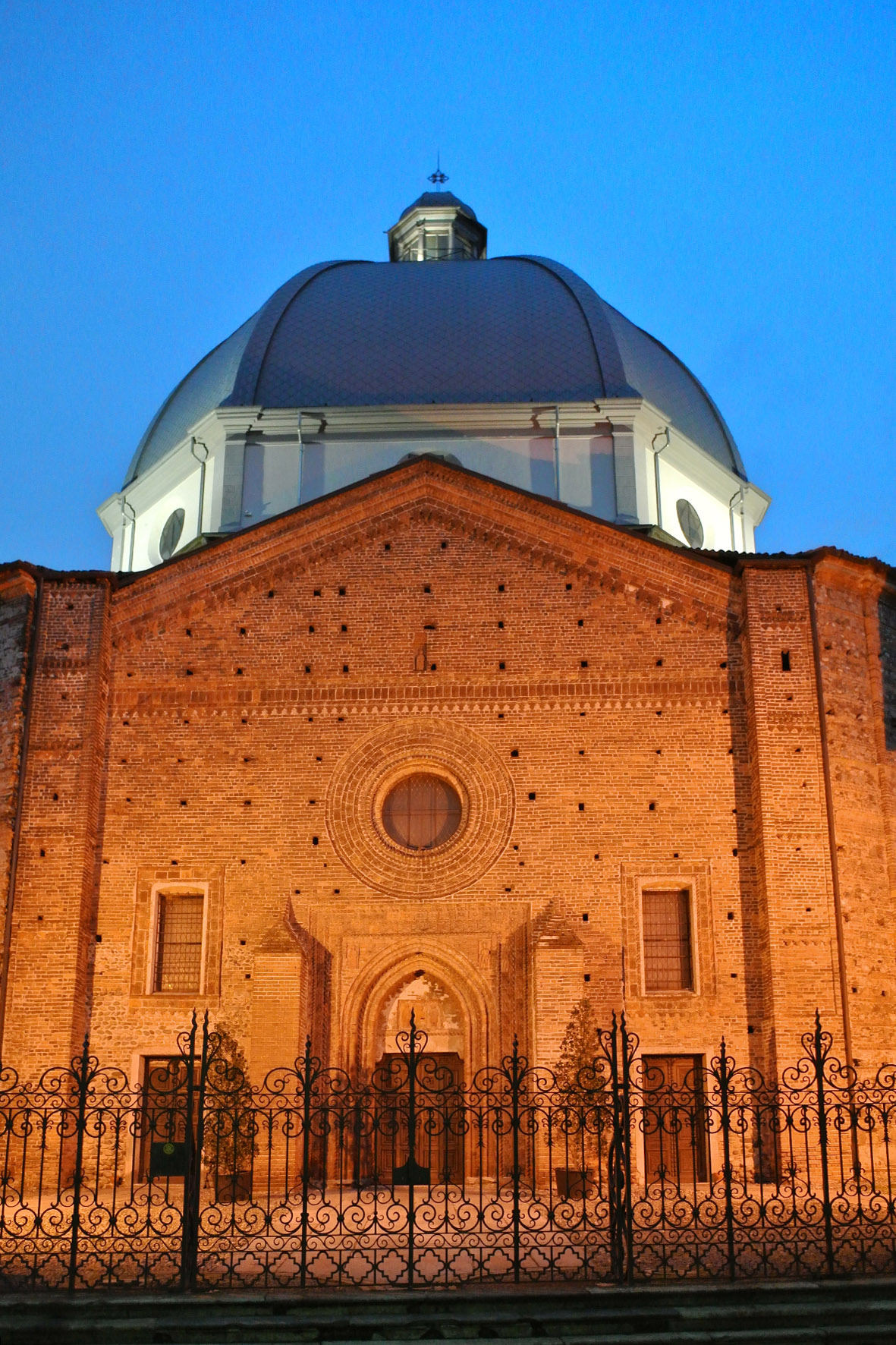
Brick facade with 14th-century portal and 19th-century dome.

San Pietro is a Roman Catholic parish church located on Corso Valsesia in the town of Gattinara, province of Vercelli, region of Piedmont, Italy. The church was built adjacent to a Canons Regular of the Lateran (Augustinian) convent. Documents recall a rural parish here dating to the early 12th century. This church gained local prominence over the next centuries, and by 1298, the attached convent owned lands throughout the valley. The present church retains the late-Romanesque brick portal, but was rebuilt in the 19th century.
