= Manelli =

Manelli is an Italian surname. Notable people with the surname include:

- Francesco Manelli (1594–1667), Italian Baroque composer
- Remo Manelli (born 1942), Luxembourgish fencer
- Romain Manelli (born 1951), Luxembourgish fencer and executive

== See also ==
- Mannelli
