= Madonna and Child with Saints (Mantegna) =

Painting attributed to Andrea Mantegna

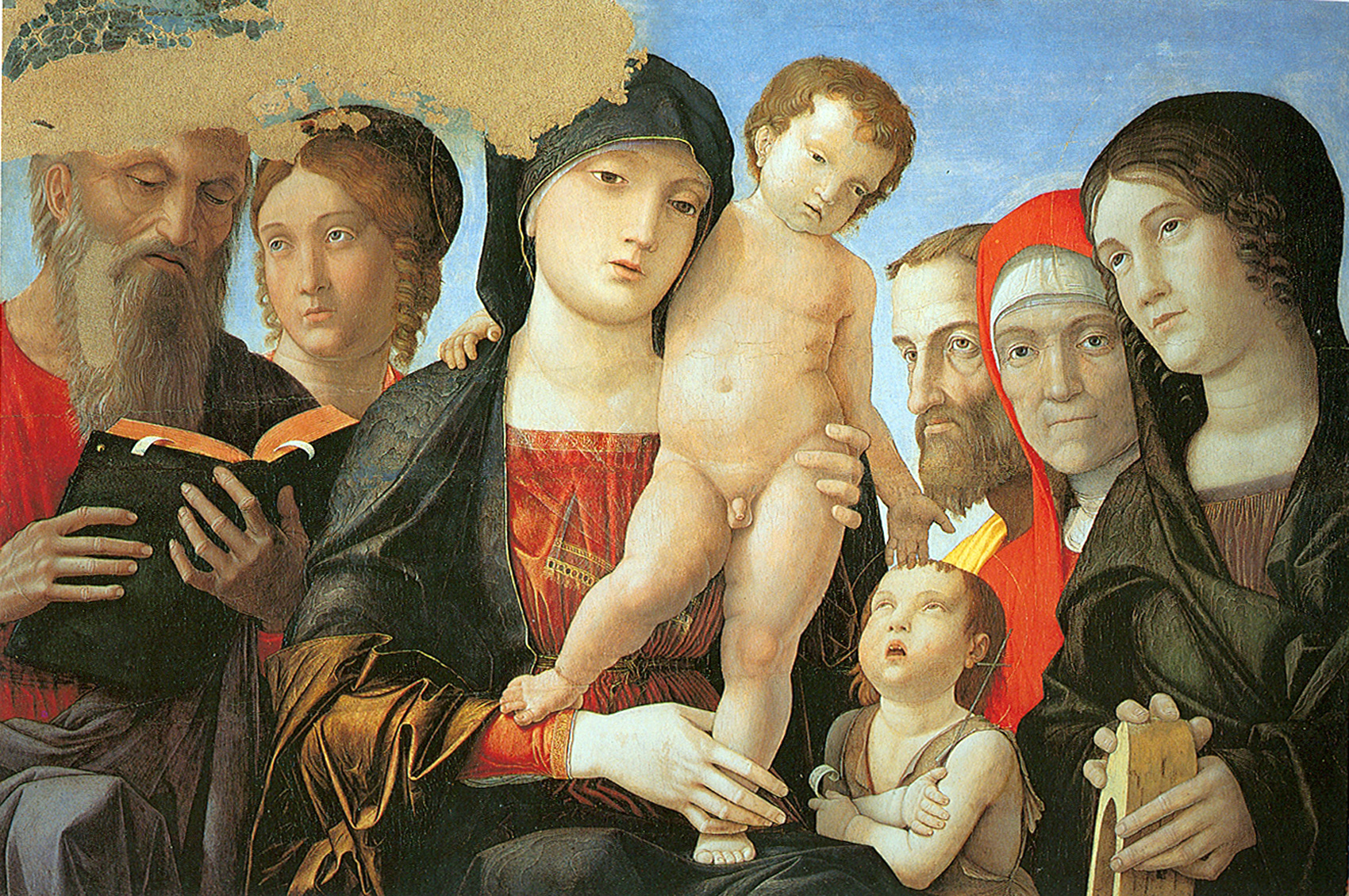
- Artist: Andrea Mantegna
- Year: 1500
- Medium: tempera on panel
- Dimensions: 61,5 cm × 87,5 cm (242 in × 344 in)
- Location: Galleria Sabauda, Turin

The Madonna and Child with Saints is a tempera on panel painting, attributed to Andrea Mantegna, dated to around 1500 and now in the Galleria Sabauda in Turin. Its top left hand corner is badly damaged.

At the Virgin's knee is the infant John the Baptist, with his cross, camel skin and a scroll reading Ecce Agnus Dei. In the right background are Catherine of Alexandria with her wheel, an old female saint (Anne or Elisabeth) and an old male saint (Joachim or Joseph). On the left are a female saint (possibly Mary Magdalene) and a male saint with a book (possibly John the Evangelist).
