= Holy Family with a Female Saint (Mantegna) =

Painting by Andrea Mantegna

Sacra famiglia con una santa
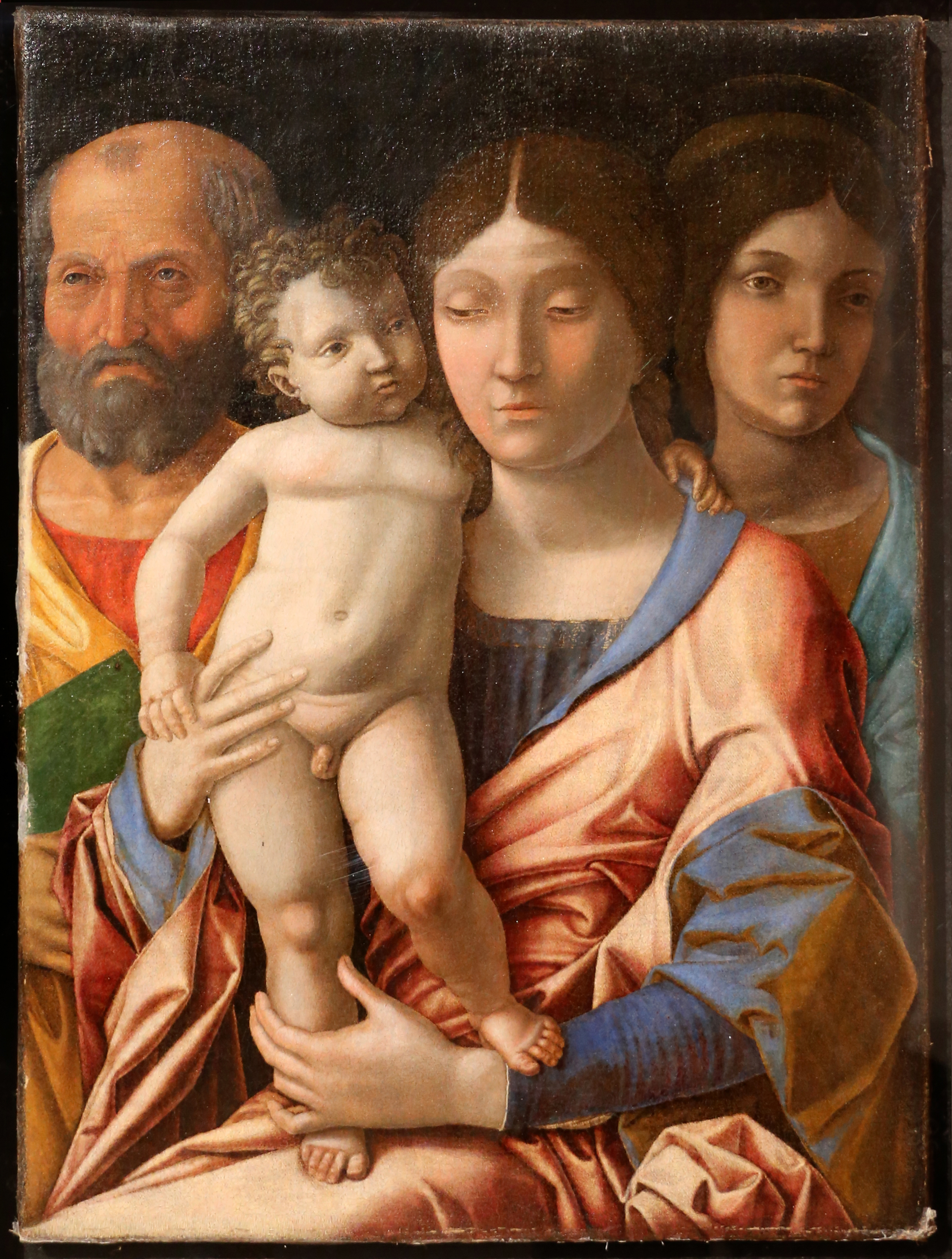
- Artist: Andrea Mantegna
- Year: 1495-1505
- Medium: tempera on canvas
- Dimensions: 76 cm × 55,5 cm (30 in × 219 in)
- Location: Museo di Castelvecchio, Verona

The Holy Family with a Female Saint is a 1495–1505 tempera on canvas painting attributed to Andrea Mantegna - the lose of the original finish and re-painting means that the painting itself cannot be securely attributed to him, though the silverpoint under-drawing is definitely in the master's hand. To the left is saint Joseph and to the right is an unidentified female saint, possibly Mary Magdalene.

It is now in the Museo di Castelvecchio in Verona, from which it was stolen on the evening of 19 November 2015 along with sixteen other works. They were found near Odessa in Ukraine on 6 May the following year, from which they were about to be sold on into Ukraine and Russia. They were returned to the museum later in 2016

== History ==
Marco Boschini saw a Mantegna Holy Family in the sacristy of the Ospedale degli Incurabili in Venice in the 17th century, which was either this work or the Altman Madonna.
