= Madonna and Child in Glory over the City of Bologna =

Painting by Annibale Carracci, c.1593

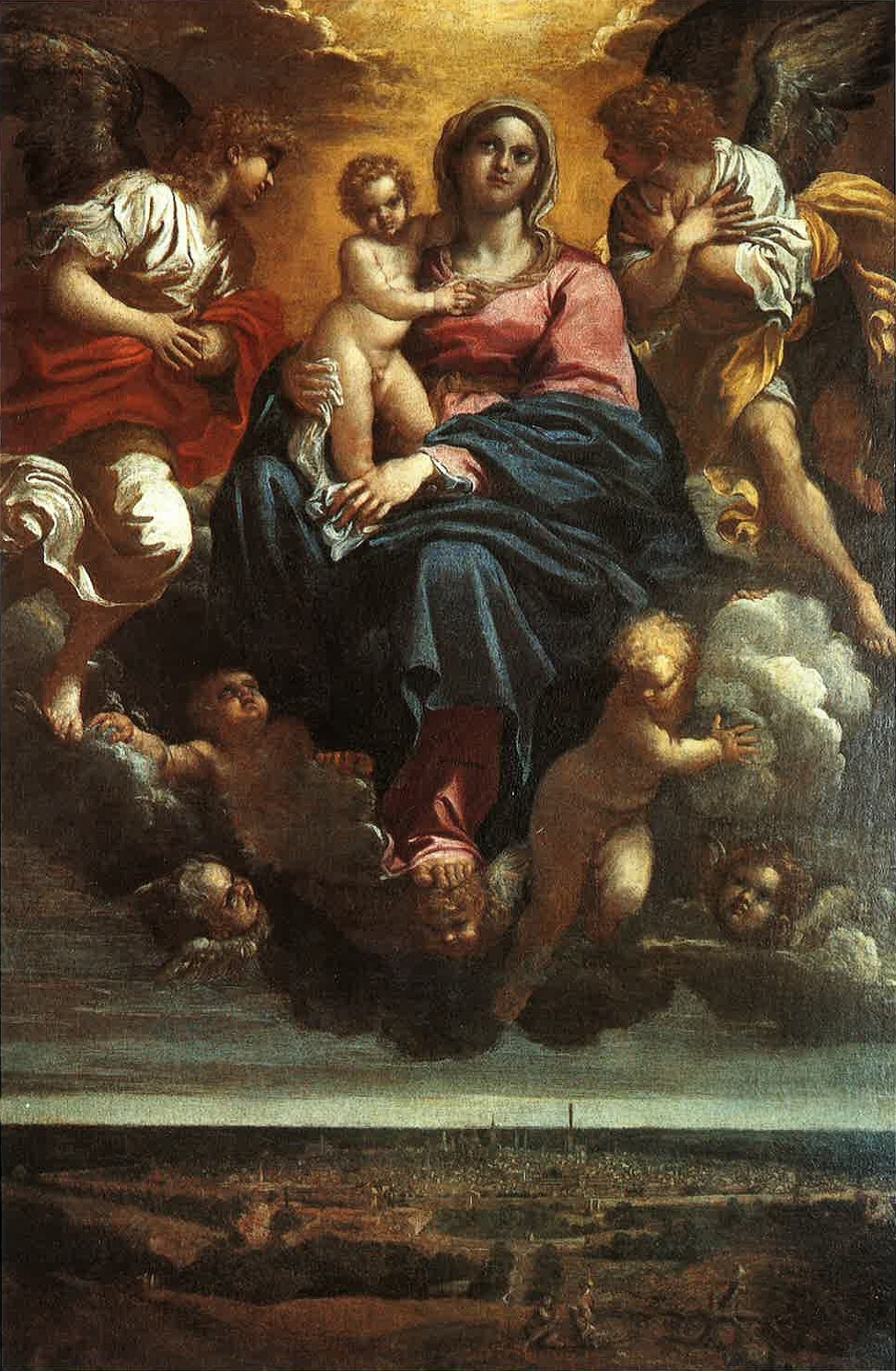
Madonna and Child in Glory over the City of Bologna (c. 1593)

Madonna and Child in Glory over the City of Bologna is a c.1593 oil painting on canvas by the Italian painter Annibale Carracci, also known as The Virgin and Child in the Clouds or the Madonna of Bologna. It is now in Christ Church Picture Gallery in Oxford.

== History ==
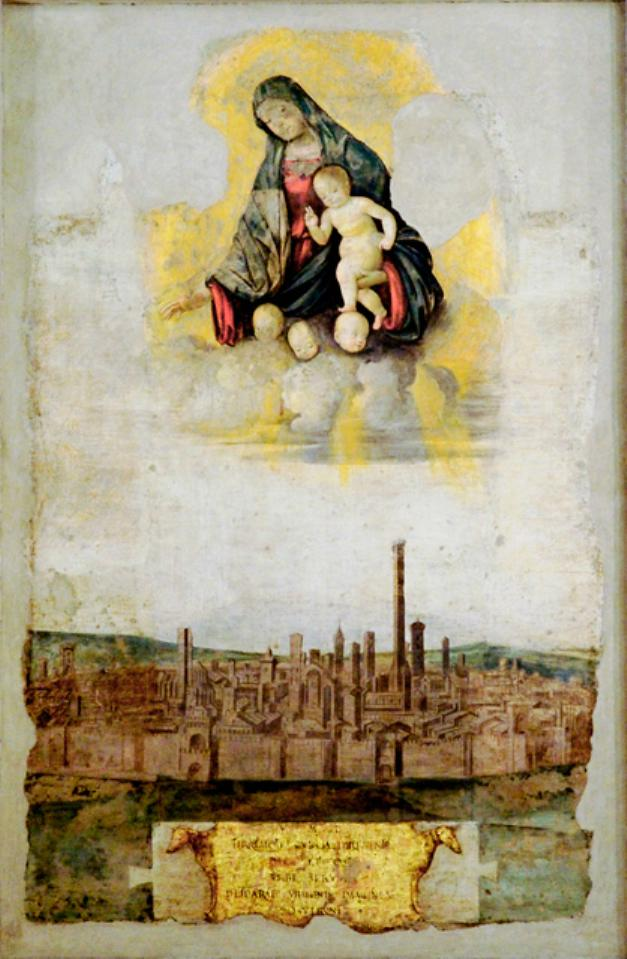
Francesco Francia, Madonna of the Earthquake, 1505, Palazzo d'Accursio, Bologna

It is unanimously identified with the work seen in the private chapel at Palazzo Caprara in Bologna by Giovanni Pietro Bellori and entitled "Madonna [and Child] in Glory with Angels over the City of Bologna seen in the distance" in his 1672 Vite dei Pittori, Scultori ed Architetti Moderni. The Caprara family was powerful and active in politics, producing several noted soldiers, which probably explains the clear civic symbolism of the work, almost certainly commissioned by them. Its dating is solely on stylistic grounds, with no documents surviving as to its commissioning and no date painted onto the work itself.

Influenced by Correggio and Venetian painters like the same artist's 1593 Madonna and Child with Saints, its composition is similar to Madonna of the Earthquake, a Francesco Francia work commissioned by the city of Bologna just under fifty years earlier as an ex voto for ending a series of earthquakes that had terrorised the city's inhabitants in 1505. Its balanced composition also suggests influence from Renaissance artists from Florence and the rest of central Italy and from works by Raphael such as his Ezekiel's Vision, which was for a long time in Bologna - the proportions of the vision's foreground and the far-off bird's eye background landscape both seem to have been a strong influence on the centre of the work now in Oxford.

A smaller version of the work on card was re-discovered by the American art historian John T. Spike, who published on it in 2002, proposing it was an autograph work by Annibale, possibly a preliminary modello requested by the painting's commissioner for final approval. Alessandro Brogi rejected this as an autograph work, but on its exhibition at a Sassoferrato exhibition in 2009 Massimo Pulini accepted Spike's attribution. Two preparatory drawings survive in the Albertina, Vienna and two in the Devonshire Collection at Chatsworth House in the UK, though all four differ from the final painted composition.

It is unknown when the work left Italy, but it was already in England by the 17th century, when it was recorded in James Thornhill's collections. It passed through a number of other collections before being bequeathed to its present owner by John Guise in 1765.

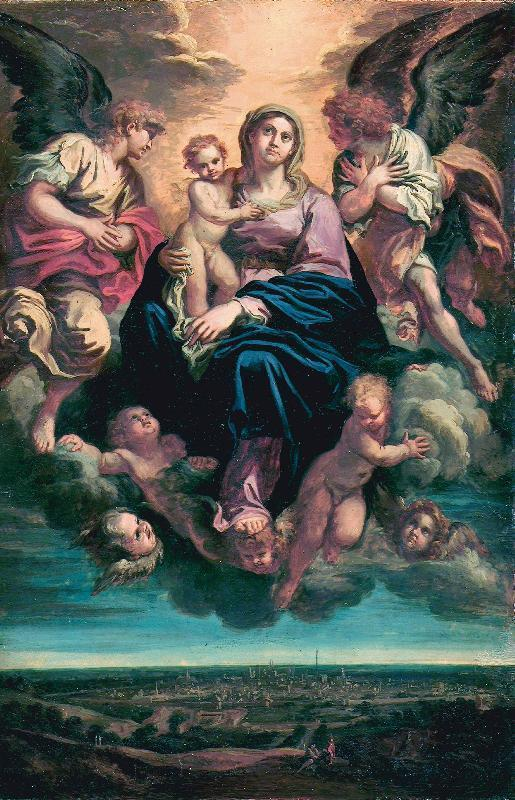
The version on card

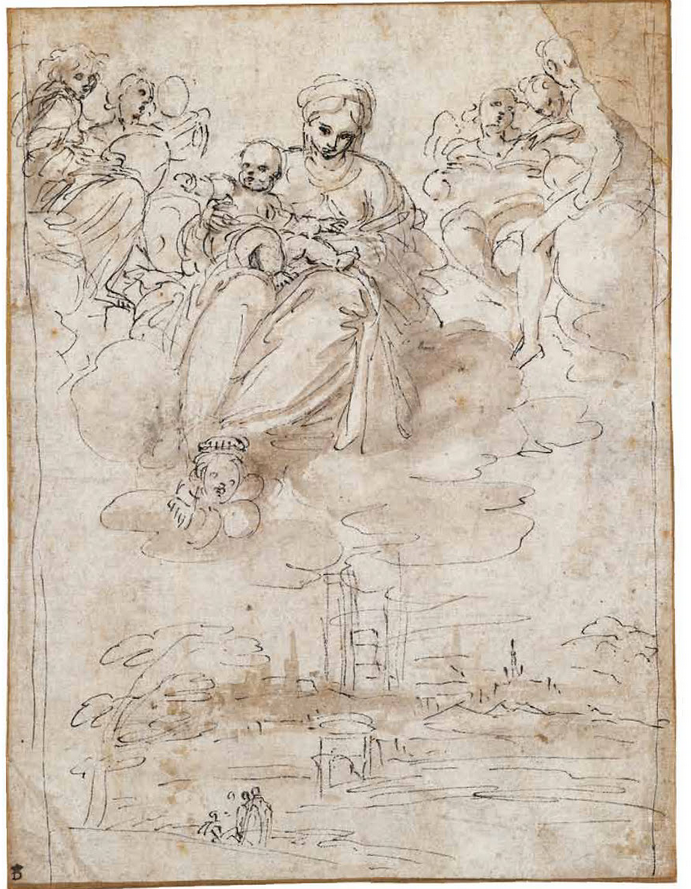
Study for the work, Chatsworth House

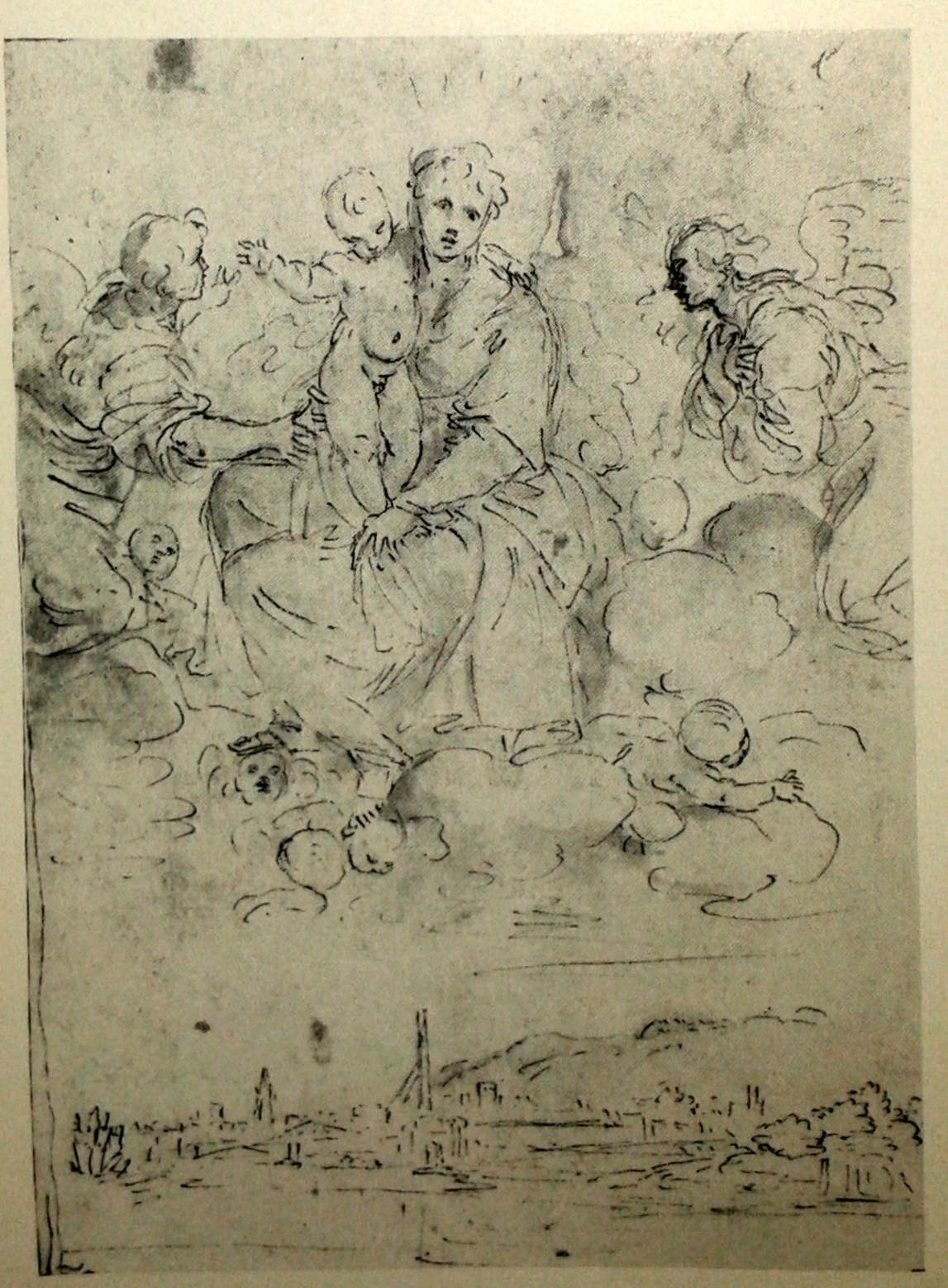
Study for the work, Chatsworth House

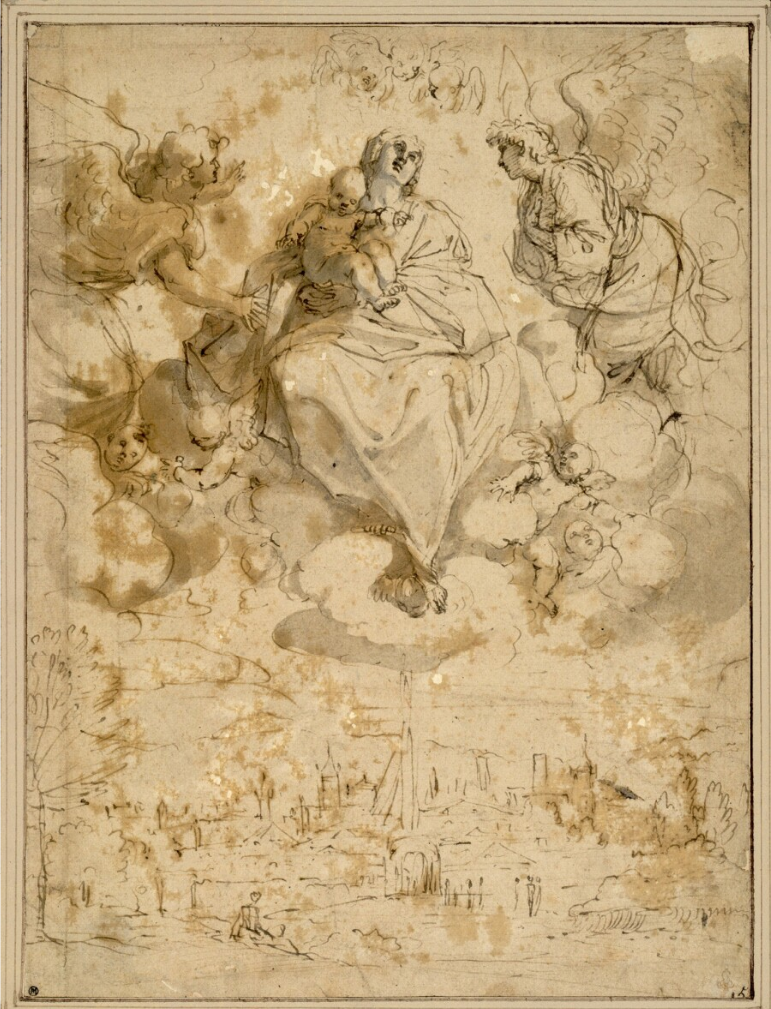
Study for the work, Albertina

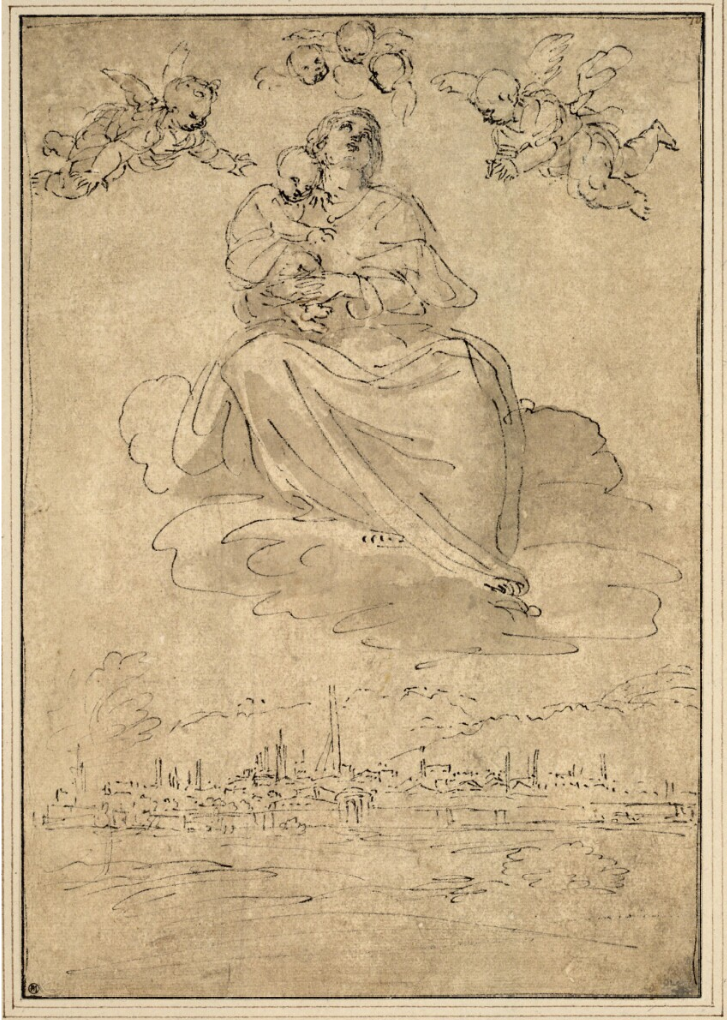
Study for the work, Albertina
