= Master of Delft =

Dutch painter (fl c. 1490–1520)

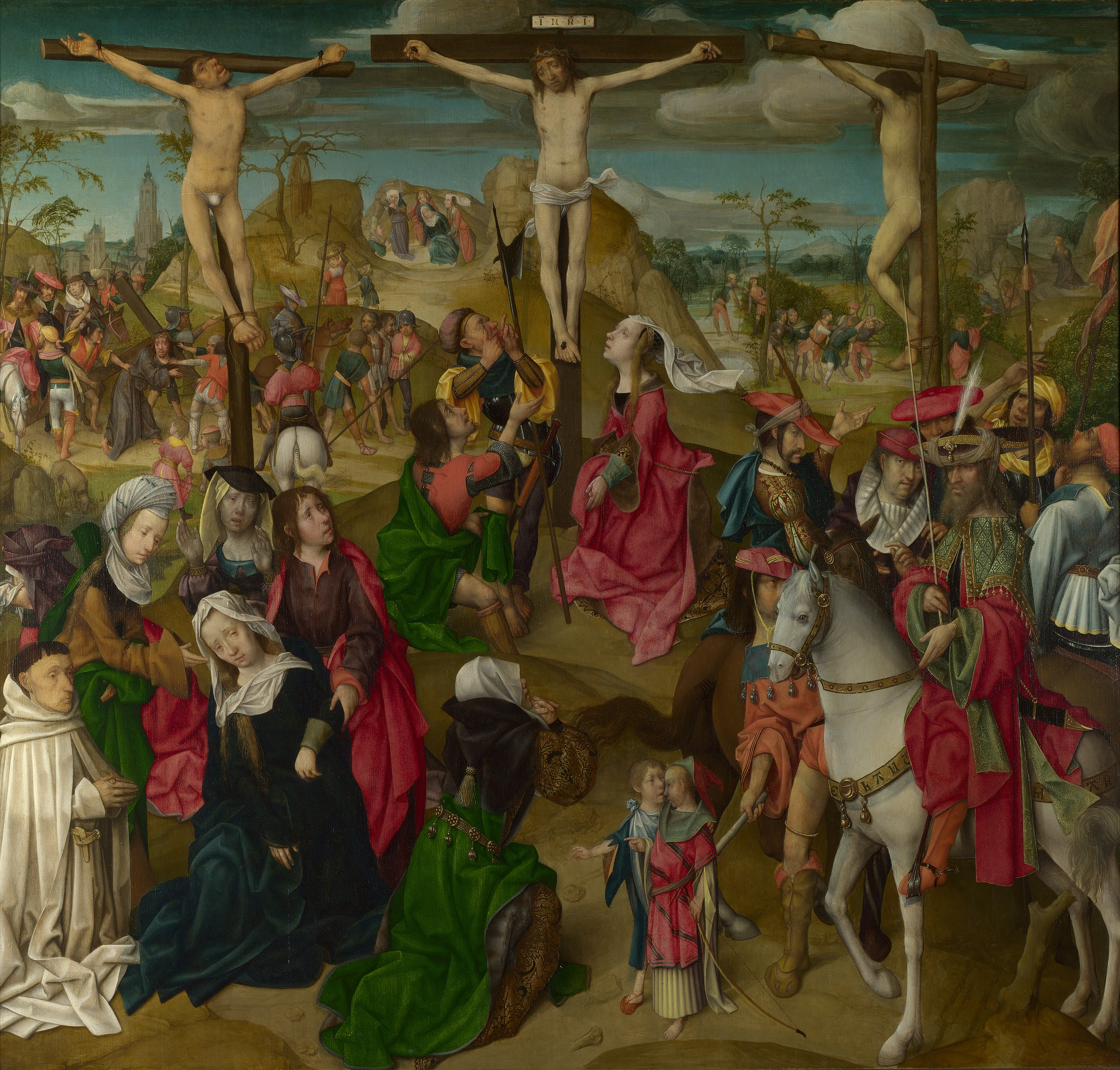
The Crucifixion: central panel. The Nieuwe Kerk tower is left of the thief on the left. National Gallery

The Master of Delft (fl c. 1490–1520) was a Dutch painter of the final period of Early Netherlandish painting, whose name is unknown. He may have been born around 1470. The notname was first used in 1913 by Max Jakob Friedländer, in describing the wings of a Triptych with the Virgin and Child with St Anne with the central panel by the Master of Frankfurt, which is now in Aachen. This has donor portraits of an identifiable family from Delft, that of the Burgomaster of Delft, Dirck Dircksz van Beest Heemskerck (1463–1545), with his wife and children.

He can also be connected to Delft by the inclusion of the Nieuwe Kerk tower, which was completed in 1496, in the background of his Scenes from the Passion of Christ triptych in the National Gallery, London, generally agreed to be his masterpiece, and the "most representative and best preserved triptych in the group" attributed to him. This can be dated fairly precisely to 1509 as none of the prints it borrows details from are dated later than that. The monastic donor kneeling at the left of the centre panel may be Herman van Rossum, provost of the Koningsveld convent just outside the city. There is a larger, related, triptych in a Cologne private collection.

As Walter Liedtke describes the triptychs, "homely, everyday, types, including a variety of low-life characters, cover most of the surface in jagged rhythms", and (it might be added) very fanciful and extravagant costume in many cases. He is a great borrower of details from prints, especially those by Lucas van Leyden, and possibly worked as a printmaker himself, probably in woodcut. Friedländer suggested he had illustrated a book published in 1498.

Delft was apparently more notable as a centre for miniatures for illuminated manuscripts in this period than for panel painting; there were many monasteries as well as churches in the city, which though small, was wealthy from textiles and brewing beer. The master's style can be compared to that of the Master of the Virgo inter Virgines, who was the other leading painter active in Delft in the same period. The careers of both masters are harder to understand because an unusually high proportion of local paintings and documents were destroyed in a series of disasters: a large fire in 1536, the Beeldenstorm of 1566, or other Protestant destruction of images. The great Delft Explosion of 1654 no doubt destroyed even more. There was also a tendency for the largest church commissions to be given to artists in the larger artistic centres to the south.

== Rijksmuseum triptych ==
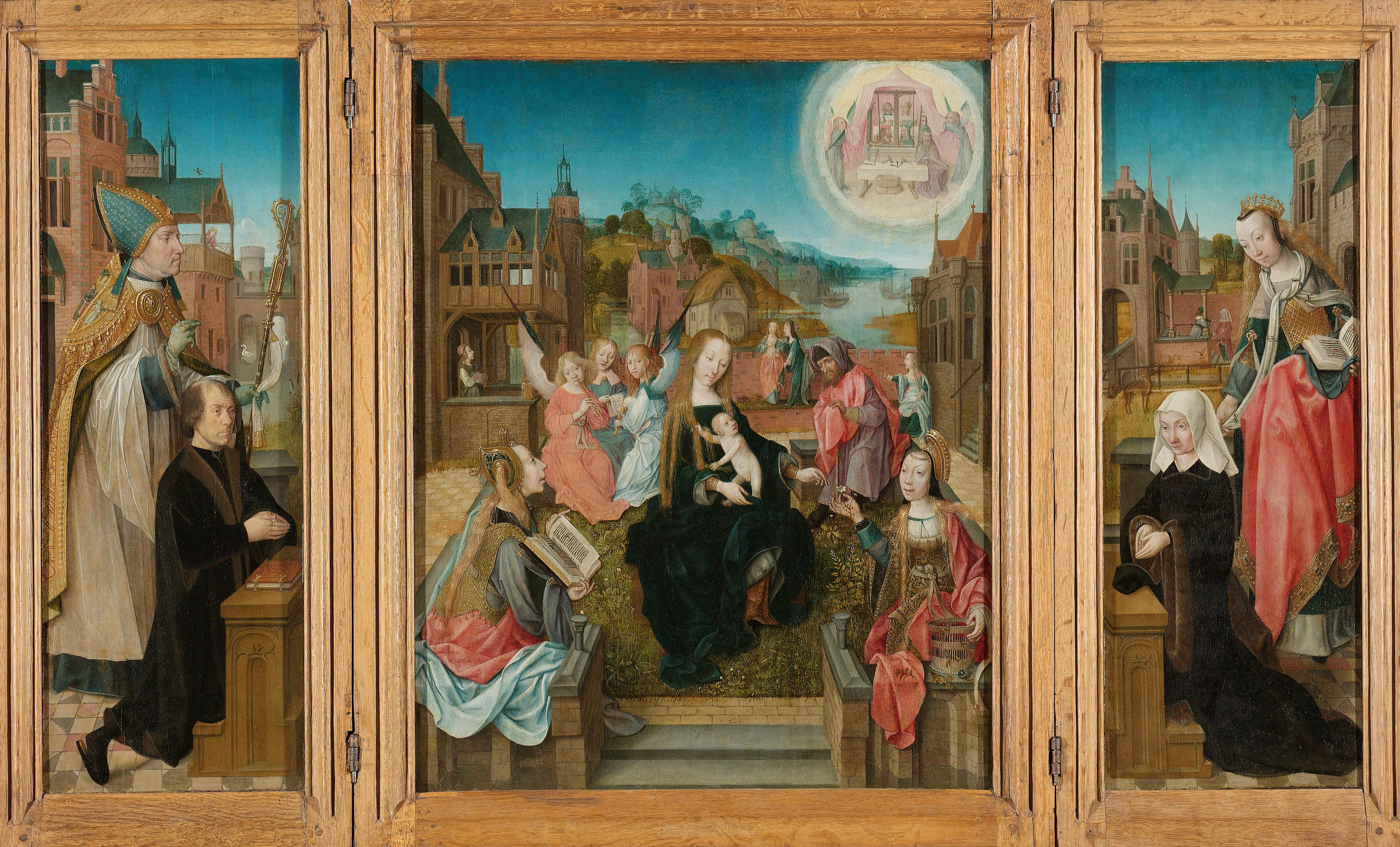
Virgin and Child with saints and donor portraits

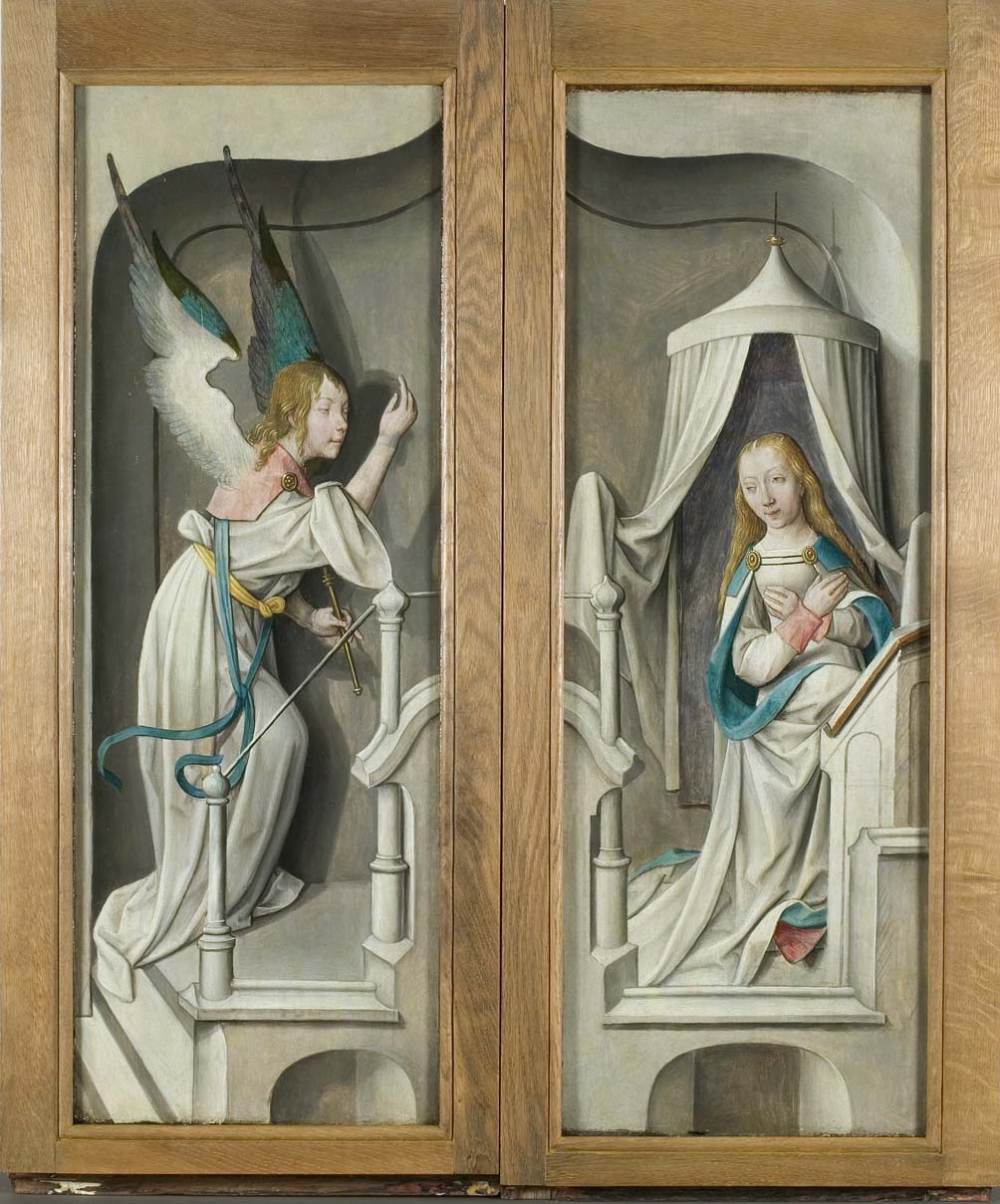
Closed wings with Annunciation, Rijksmuseum/Museum Catharijneconvent

A triptych of the Virgin with saints and an unidentified donor couple belonging to the Rijksmuseum but on loan to the Museum Catharijneconvent, Utrecht, is dated to c. 1500–1510; it lacks the lively crowds of his other triptychs, but is calmer and more traditional. The side wings have the kneeling donor couple, him to the left, her to the right, each with a standing saint behind, presenting them to the divine figures in the centre panel, a common arrangement. The bishop-saint on the left wing, probably Saint Martin of Tours, may be a disguised portrait of David of Burgundy, a bastard son of Duke Philip the Good of Burgundy, who was made Bishop of Utrecht. He died in 1496, although the portrait might be a posthumous memorial.

The outside of the wings, which would probably have been the everyday view of the work, kept closed except on special feasts or perhaps Sundays, show an Annunciation, mostly in grisaille except for the hair & other small areas.

The central panel shows a hortus conclusus or small garden enclosed with a (very low) wall set in an urban scene with water and mountains in the distance. The Virgin sits near the front, with the Christ Child standing naked on her lap, holding her hair for support. There are several other figures, all female (or angelic) except for Saint Joseph at the back of the garden. At the front and sitting on the wall are two exotically dressed women; behind the Virgin a group of three angels are performing music, with bagpipes, a recorder, and the third singing from a musical score. Further back, and outside the garden, four women, none paying attention to those in the garden, seem to be ordinary inhabitants of the setting going about their lives.

In the sky, a vision shows the Arma Christi, or Instruments of the Passion, in a tent whose hangings are pulled back by angels. The scene is unusual in iconography, and has been explained by one scholar in an interpretation not yet generally accepted, and recognised but not agreed by Jan Piet Filedt Kok in his Rijksmuseum catalogue. According to this, rather than being saints who are hard to identify, the two women at the front of the gardens are sibyls, one of whom is showing the infant Christ his future.

== Other works ==
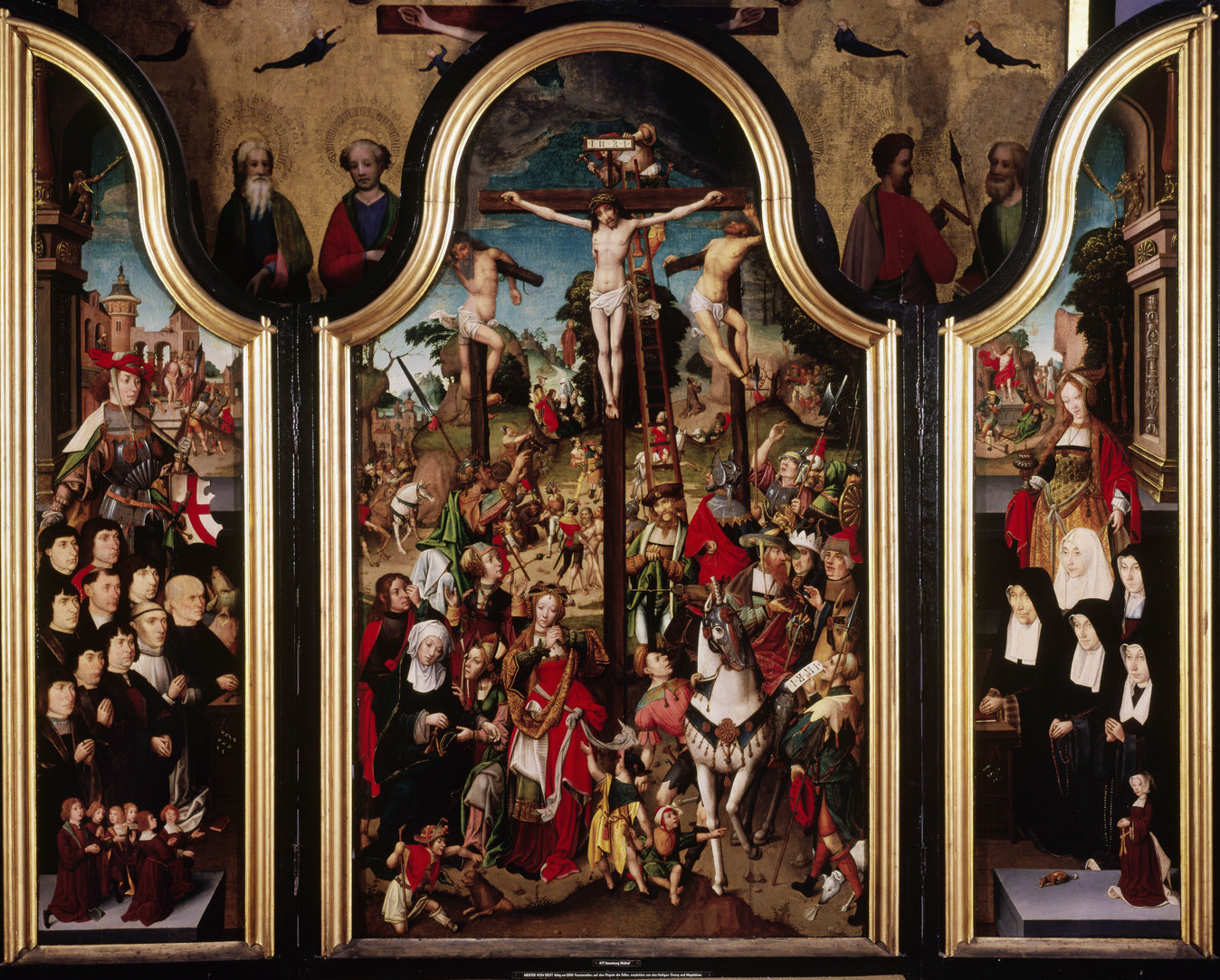
Crucifixion triptych, Wallraf-Richartz-Museum, Cologne

The outer sides of the van Beest triptych in Aachen whose wings he painted have a scene of Saint Jerome in the desert with his lion. This is fully coloured, while there are saints in grisaille on the outsides of the wings of the London (two per wing) and Cologne triptychs. The Museum Catharijneconvent in Utrecht have a Virgin with the vision of Bernard of Clairvaux of perhaps 1495. He or an artist in his workshop or circle painted a Christ Carrying the Cross in the Louvre (not on display in 2020). Christ Church Picture Gallery in Oxford has a Lamentation.

A triptych "possibly" by the master, in a private collection in Switzerland, has a central Adoration of the Magi, with a Flight into Egypt on the left panel, and a Massacre of the Innocents on the right. Several other possible attributions or ascriptions are given on the RKD database.

== Gallery ==
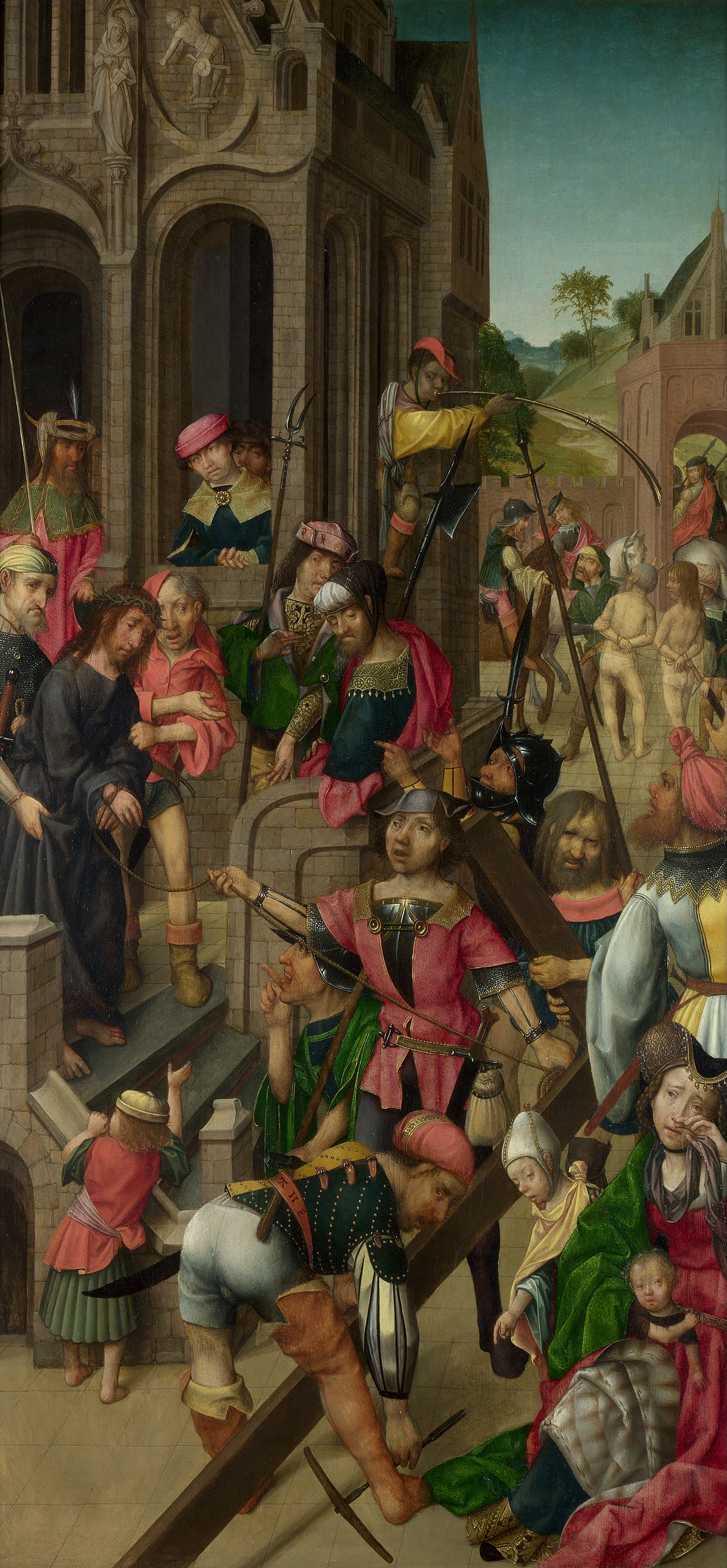
Christ Presented to the People: left wing, London

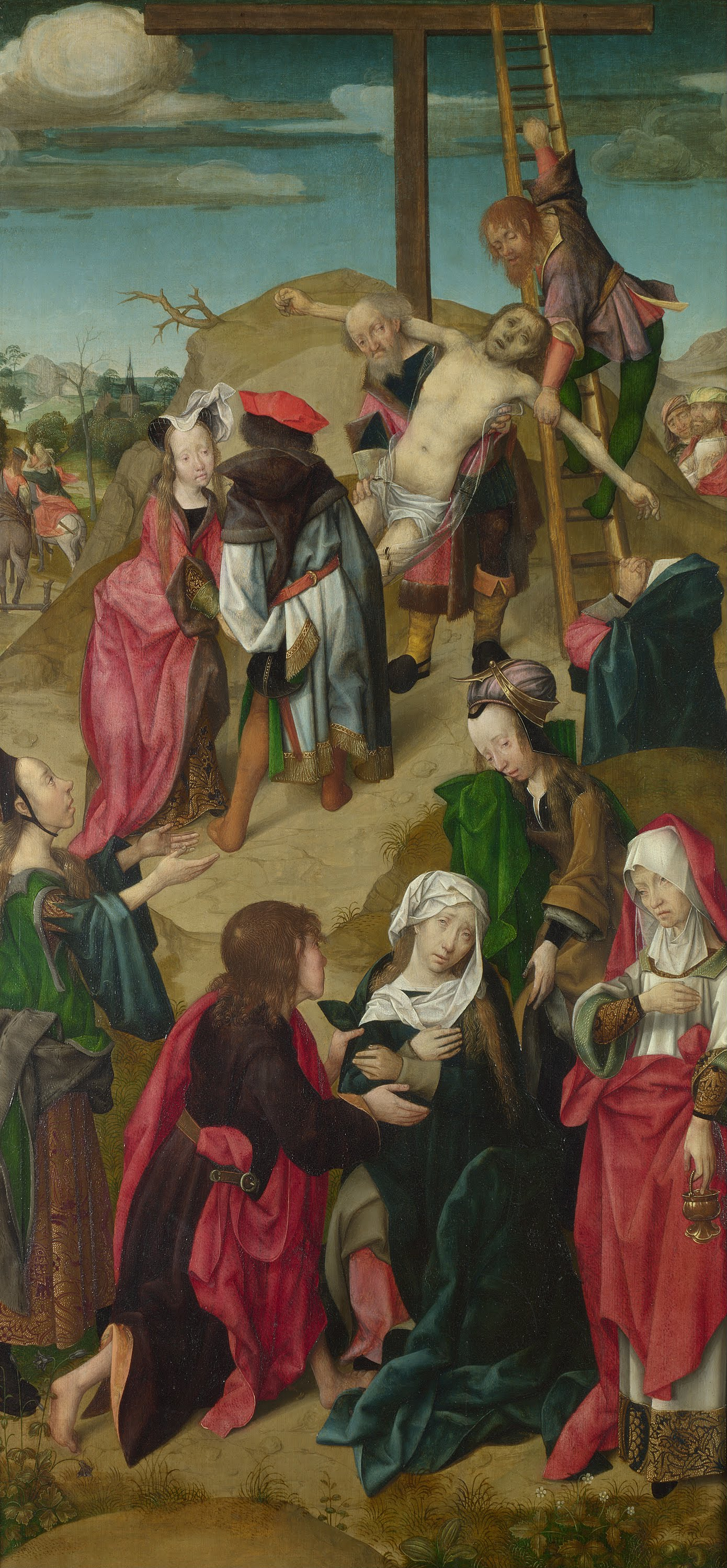
The Deposition: right wing, London

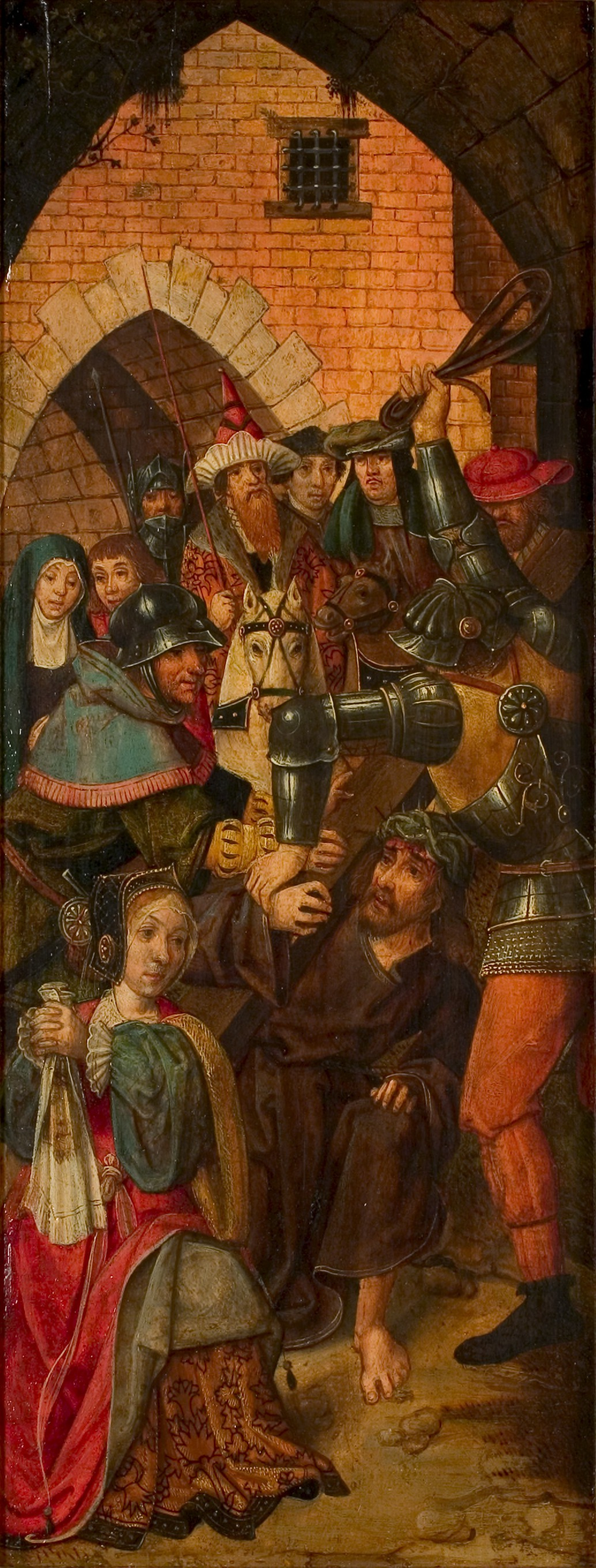
Side wing from a Crucifixion triptych, Rijksmuseum Twenthe, "workshop of the Master of Delft".

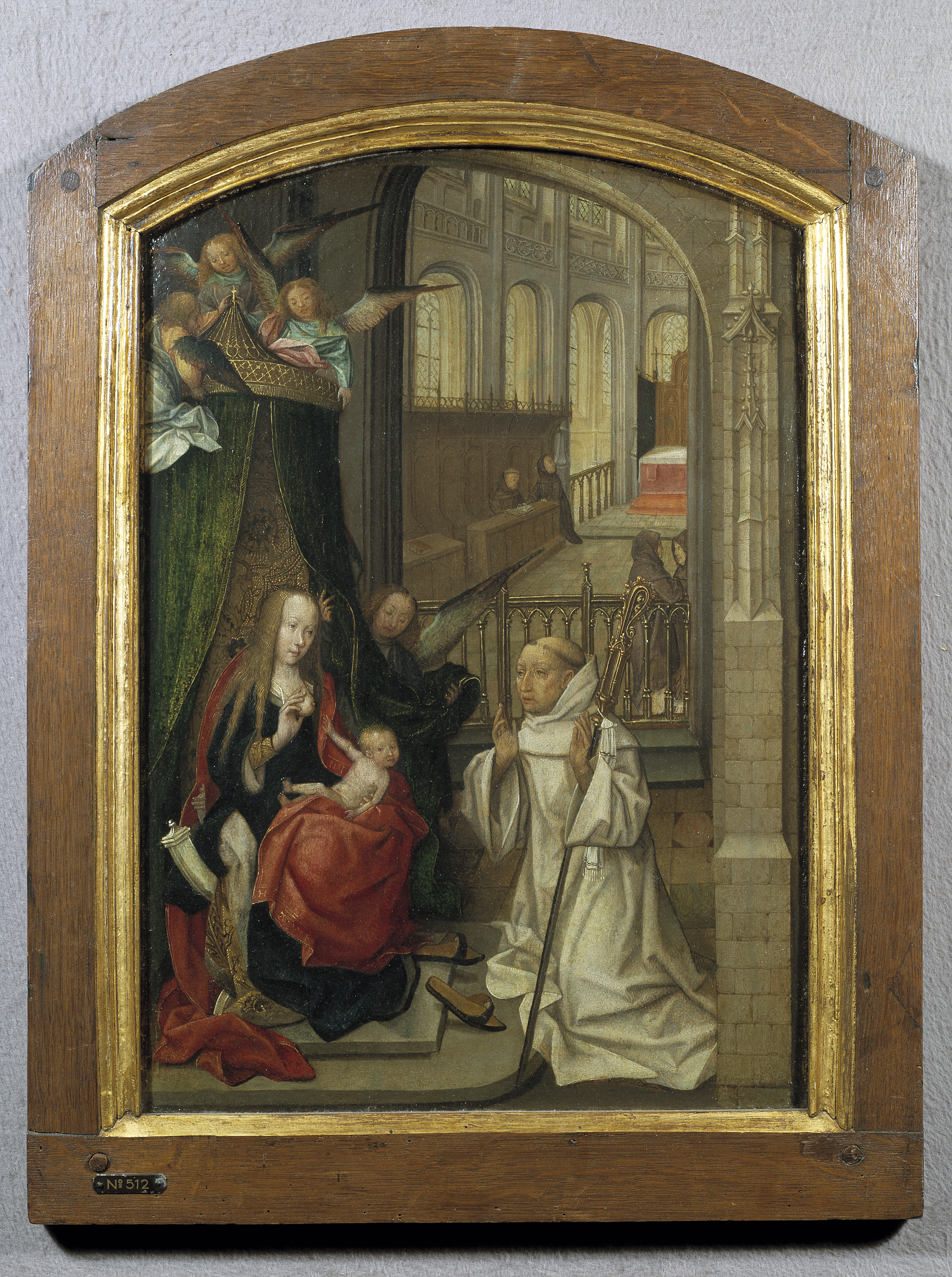
Virgin with the vision of Bernard of Clairvaux, c. 1495, Museum Catharijneconvent.

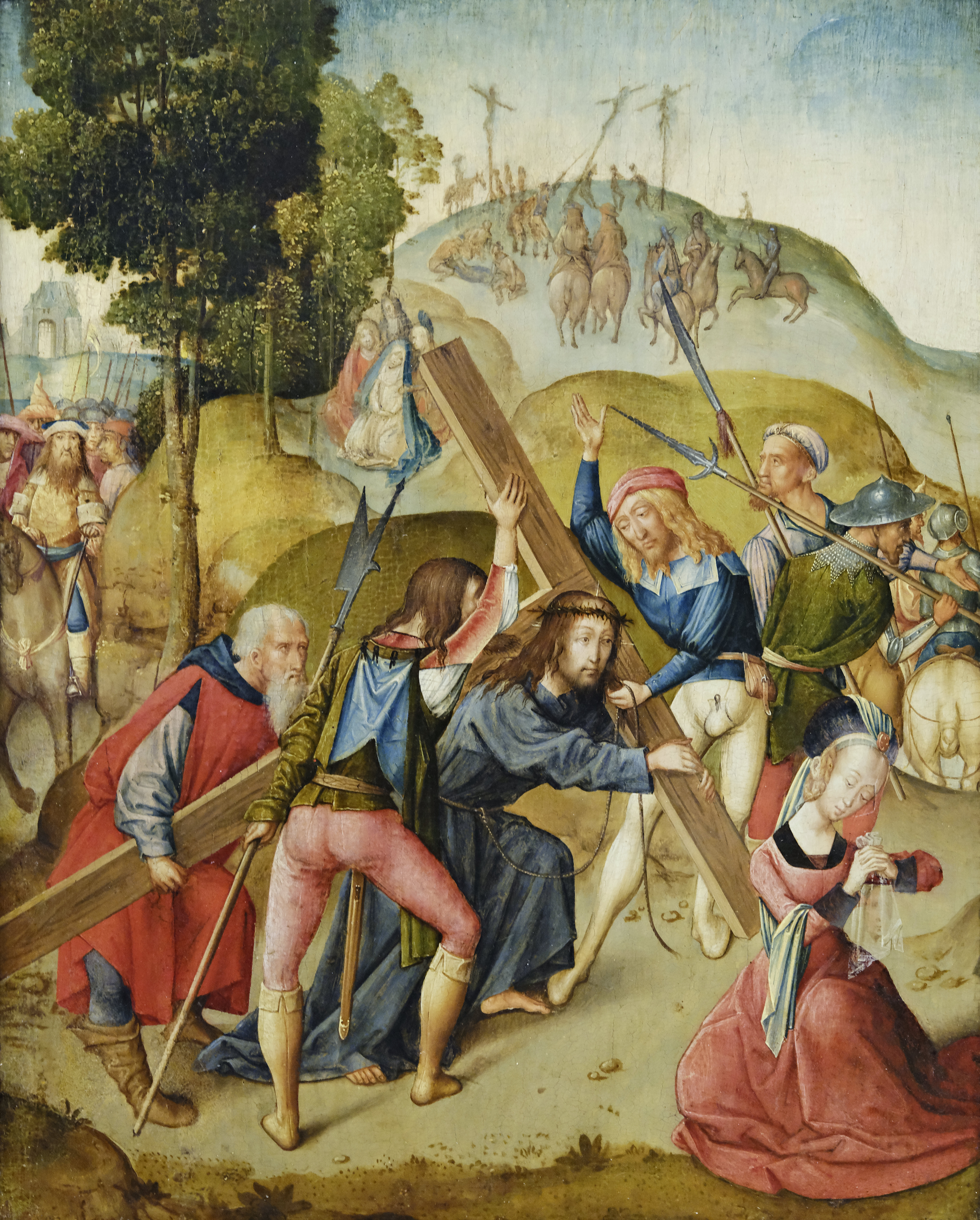
Workshop or follower, Christ Carrying the Cross, Louvre

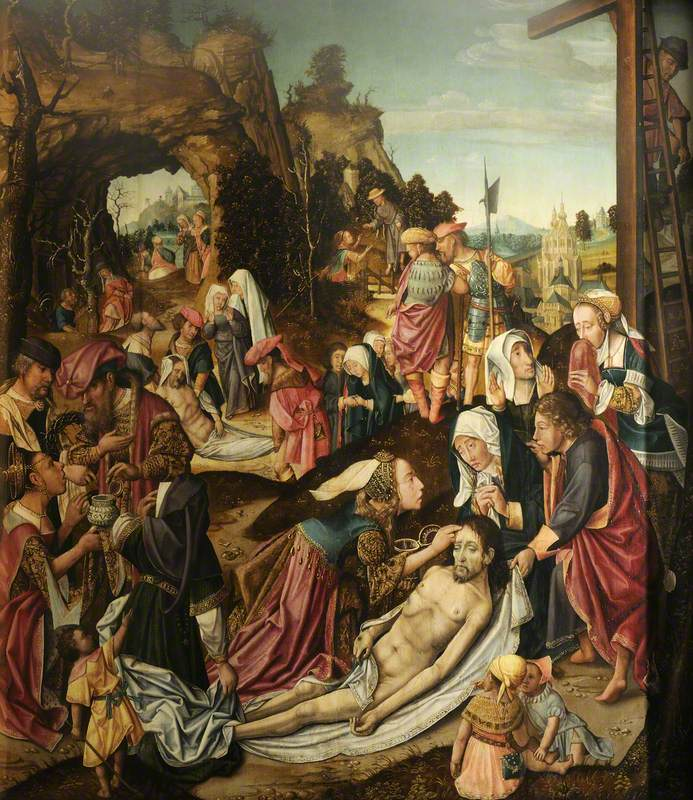
The Deposition of Christ

== See also ==
- List of anonymous masters
