= A Soldier on Horseback =

C.1616 painting by Anthony van Dyck

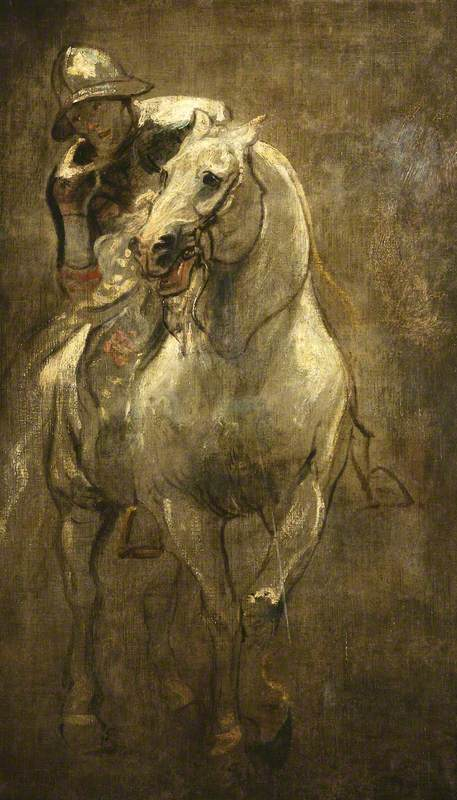
- Artist: Anthony van Dyck
- Year: c.1616
- Medium: oil on panel
- Dimensions: 91 cm × 55 cm (36 in × 22 in)
- Location: formerly Christ Church Picture Gallery, stolen in March 2020

A Soldier on Horseback is a c. 1616 painting by Flemish painter Anthony van Dyck. It was held at Christ Church Picture Gallery until its theft in March 2020. The painting's empty frame now hangs at its former location in the Gallery.

== History ==
The painting was part of the collection of John Guise, a British army officer. Upon his death in 1765, he bequeathed this painting with his entire collection to Christ Church, Oxford, his alma mater. From 1765 to 2020, A Soldier on Horseback was held at Christ Church Picture Gallery. The painting was stolen by burglars who managed to gain access to the gallery on 14 March 2020. Stolen alongside Van Dyck's painting were Salvator Rosa's A Rocky Coast, with Soldiers Studying a Plan and Annibale Carracci's A Boy Drinking. The location of the painting is unknown as of 2026.

== Description ==
The painting consists of a soldier dressed in armour sitting on horseback. The painting does not make much use of colour, leaving some to speculate that is unfinished.

== See also ==
- List of paintings by Anthony van Dyck
