= Madonna and Child with Saints (Annibale Carracci, 1593) =

Painting by Annibale Carracci

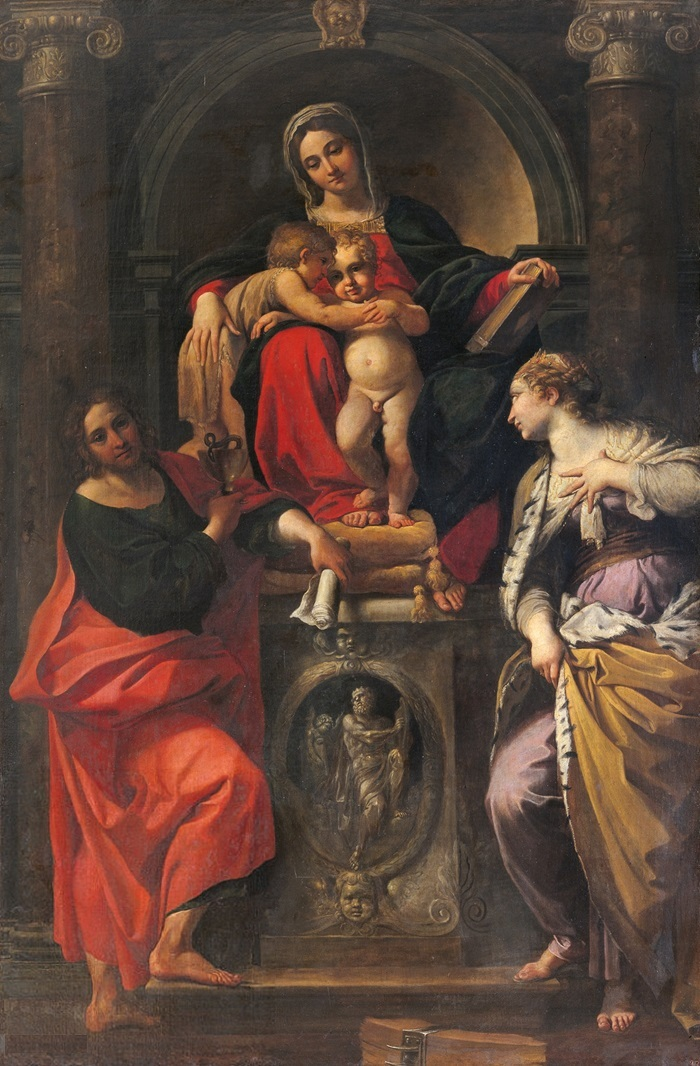
Madonna and Child with Saints (1593)

Madonna and Child with Saints, Madonna and Child Enthroned with the Infant St John the Baptist, St John the Evangelist and Saint Catherine of Alexandria or the San Giorgio Madonna is a 1593 oil painting on canvas by the Italian Baroque painter Annibale Carracci, originally in the Landini chapel in the church of San Giorgio in Poggiale, Bologna. During the 19th century the conservation conditions there worsened and it was moved to the Accademia di Belle Arti for restoration, before being moved to its current home in the then-new Pinacoteca Nazionale di Bologna. It is signed and dated "ANNI CARR FE MDXCIII".

== Autograph status ==
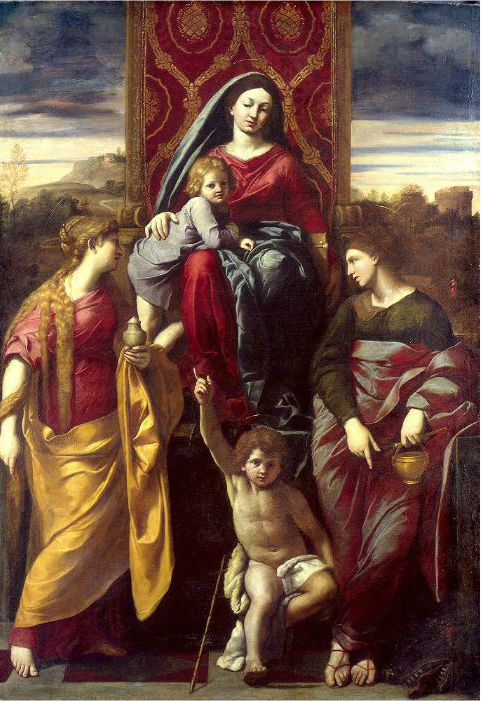
Antonio Carracci, Madonna and Child Enthroned with the Infant Saint John the Baptist, Saint Mary Magdalene and Saint Martha, 1616, Gemäldegalerie, Berlin

The work was praised in the 17th century by Giovanni Pietro Bellori and Carlo Cesare Malvasia, the artist's main biographers of that century, but it came to be less-appreciated over the course of the 20th century, with the first modern scholar of Annibale, Hans Tieze, even spreading the opinion that much of the work was by Annibale's follower Lucio Massari. That idea was refuted by Rudolf Wittkower, but partly supported by Donald Posner, one of the major scholars on Annibale, who felt that surviving preparatory drawings were autograph, but the painting was partly or wholly executed by Massari. Posner supported this conclusion by reference to a canvas now in Berlin which is clearly connected to the Bologna work and which he attributed to Massari, seeing it as another proof of the student's debt to the master in the Bologna work. Posner's conclusion has been overthrown by preparatory drawings for the Bologna work definitely in Annibale's hand which – with the historic sources stating the work was by Carracci himself – seem to confirm its autograph status. Modern scholarship also holds the Berlin work to be by Annibale's nephew Antonio Carracci rather than Massari, thus representing Antonio drawing on his uncle's work at San Giorgio rather than Massari drawing on his master's.

== Description and style ==
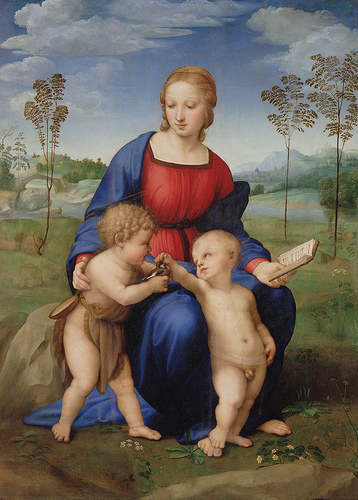
Raphael, Madonna del Cardellino, ca. 1506, Florence, Uffizi

The painting marks an important moment in the evolution of Annibale Carracci's artistic interests. In fact, if the works of the immediately preceding years are characterized by a strong adhesion to the Venetian painting of Veronese, of Tintoretto and of Titian, in the Madonna di San Giorgio Annibale experiments with other directions of research.

Although the warm colour scheme and some details – such as the figure of Saint Catherine, comparable to the types of Veronese – still refer to Venice, the symmetrical and frontal composition of the painting, the centrality of the Virgin, and the placidity of the action, bring the Madonna di San Giorgio closer to the Renaissance sacred conversations.

The first reference model, in this sense, is Correggio – a master who had strongly influenced Annibale's painting before the Venetian turn – and in particular his Madonna and Child with St Francis, which corresponds to the detail of the relief sculpted on the throne, placed in an oval niche, inside which, in Annibale's painting, is a relief of King David playing the lyre. The framing of the scene between Ionic columns in jasper also derives from Correggio's work.

Even more significant is the circumstance that in this painting Annibale directly measures himself, for the first time, with the great Central Italian tradition of Florentine origin. In the Madonna di San Giorgio a marked compositional assonance has been detected both with the Madonna of the Harpies by Andrea del Sarto and with the Salvator mundi by Fra Bartolomeo. The unfolding of the action against a closed niche and the greater concentration of the characters depicted, inserted in a pyramidal scheme, bring the work of the Bologna Art Gallery closer to these Florentine precedents even more than to Correggio's Madonna.

Equally perceptible is the influence of Raphael. In Annibale's canvas, references can be identified to the Madonna del Cardellino, from which the group of the Virgin and the two children derives and of which there is a literal citation in the detail of the foot of the Baby Jesus resting on the foot of the Mother.

== Gallery ==
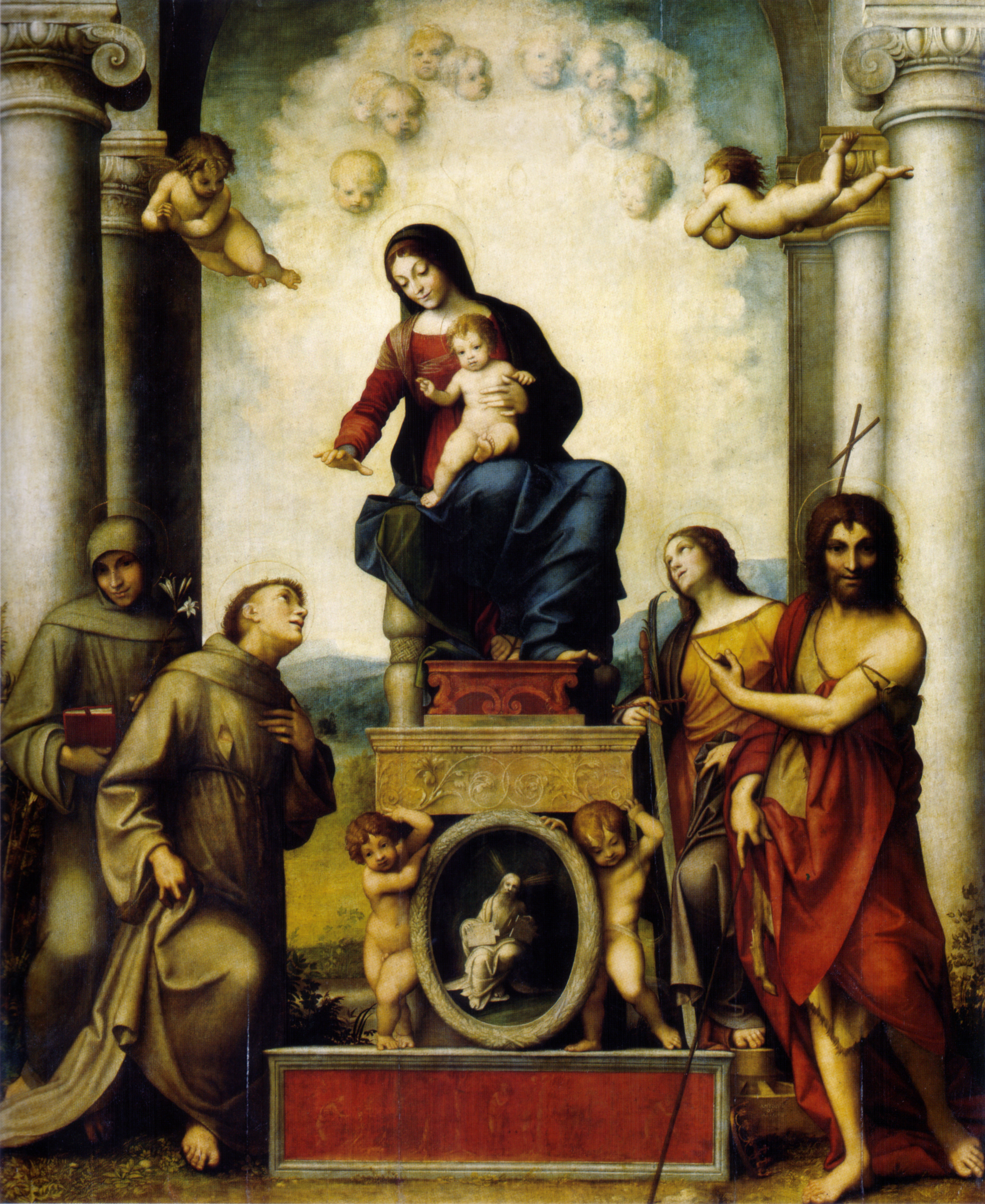
Correggio, Madonna and Child with St Francis, 1514–1515, Gemäldegalerie, Dresden

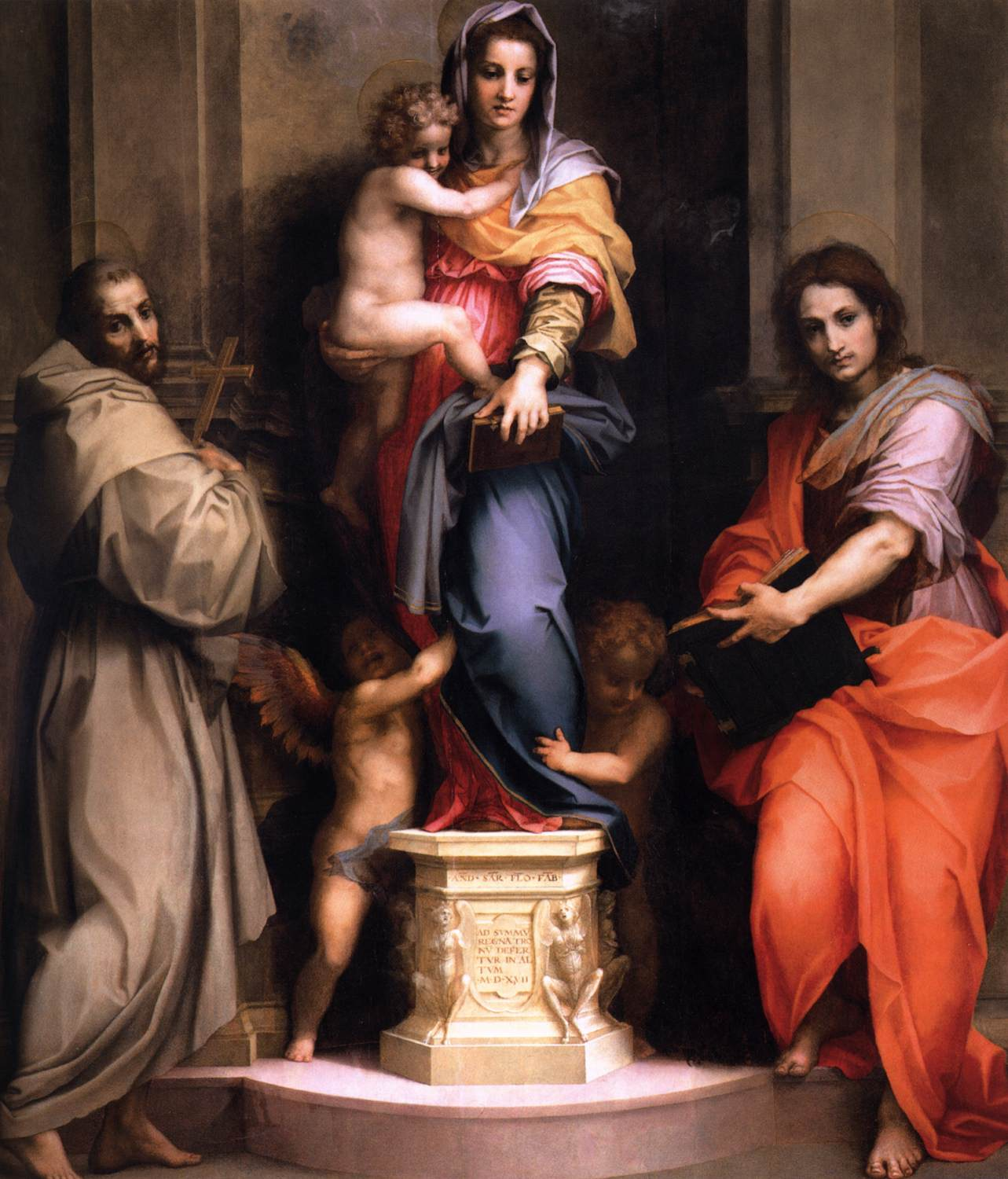
Andrea del Sarto, Madonna of the Harpies, 1517, Uffizi, Florence

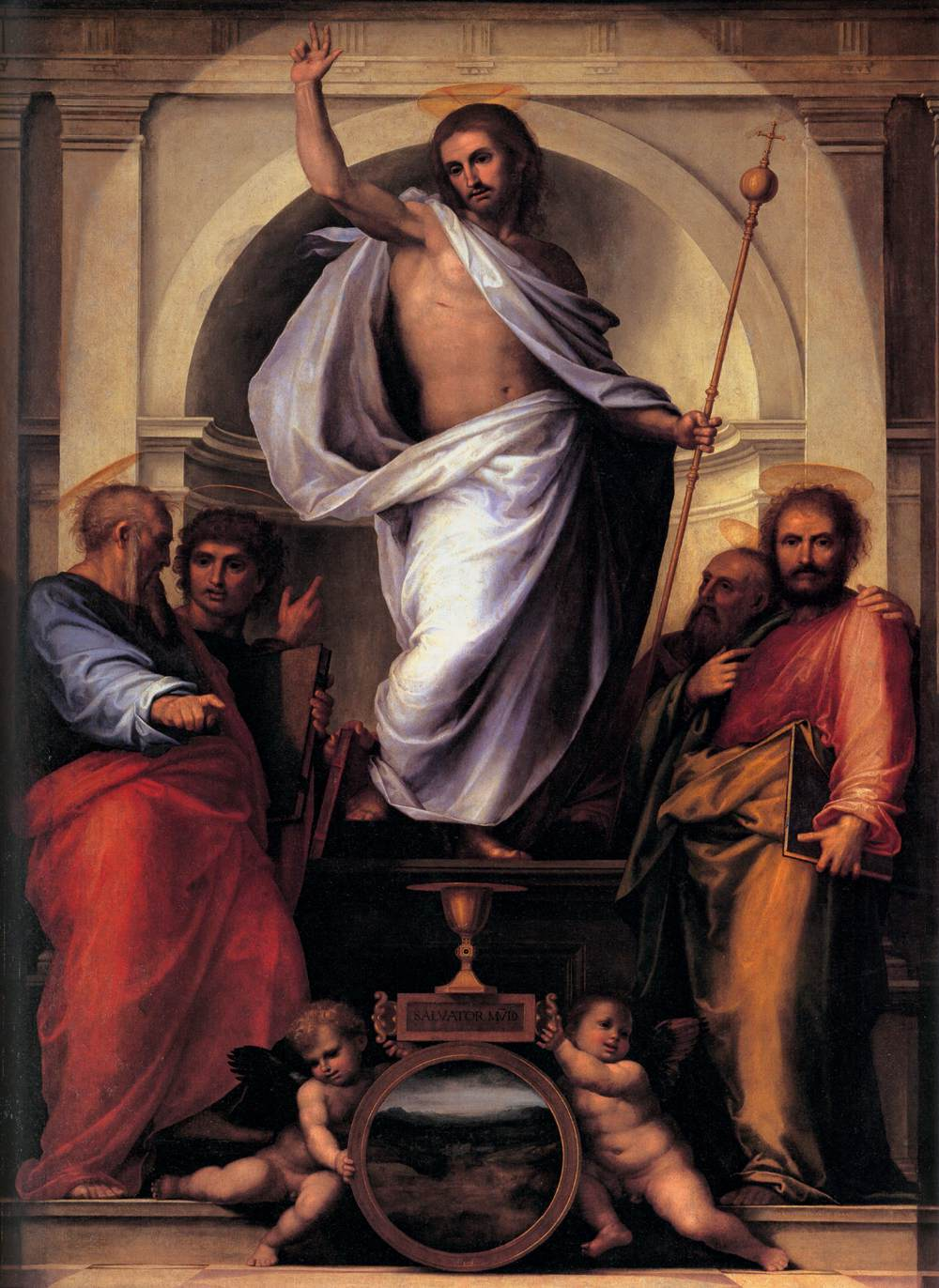
Fra Bartolomeo, Salvator mundi, 1516, Galleria Palatina, Florence
