= Triptych with the Virgin and Child, Saints and Donors =

Painting by the Master of Delft

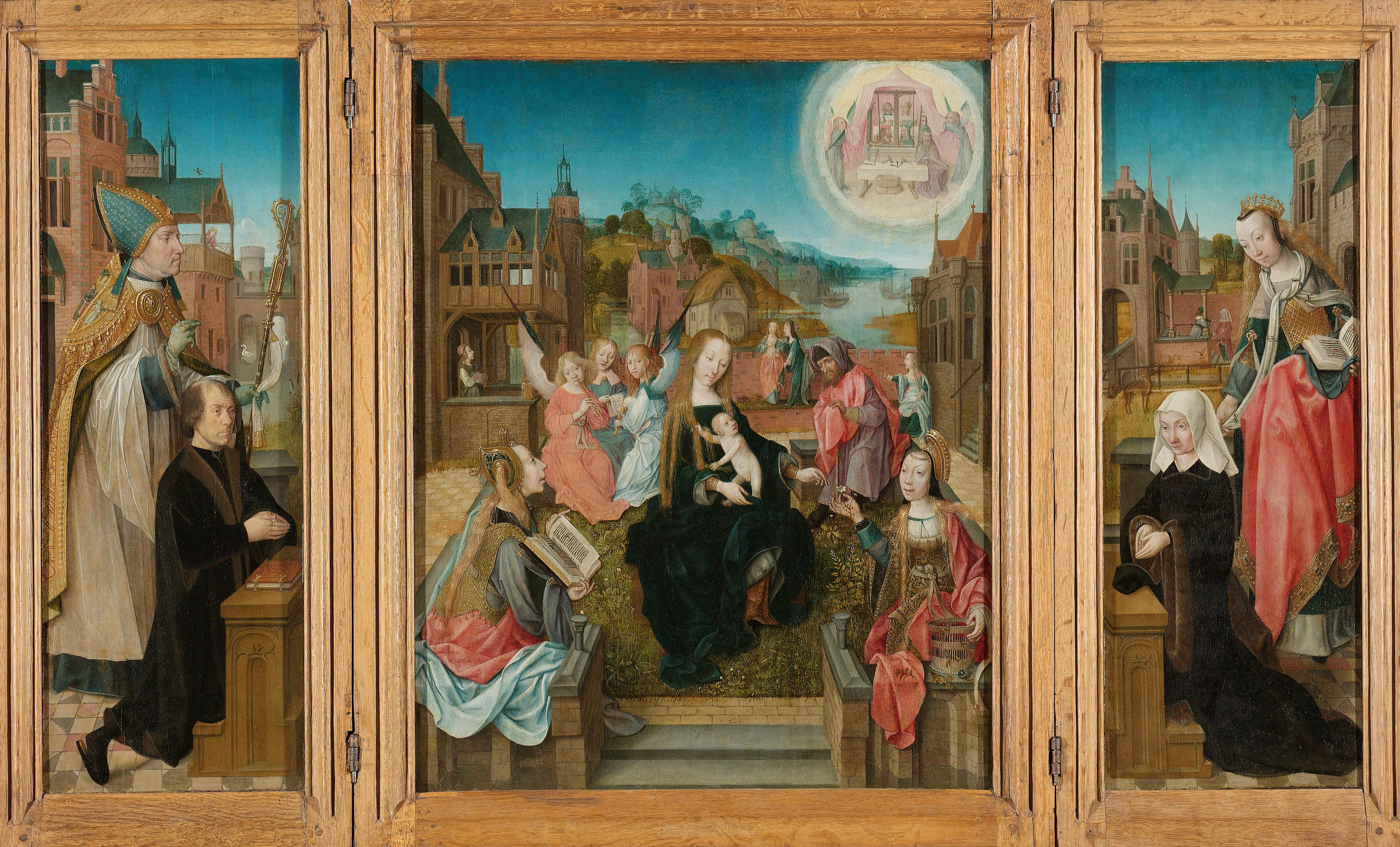
Virgin with saints and donor portraits, the three panels of the open view

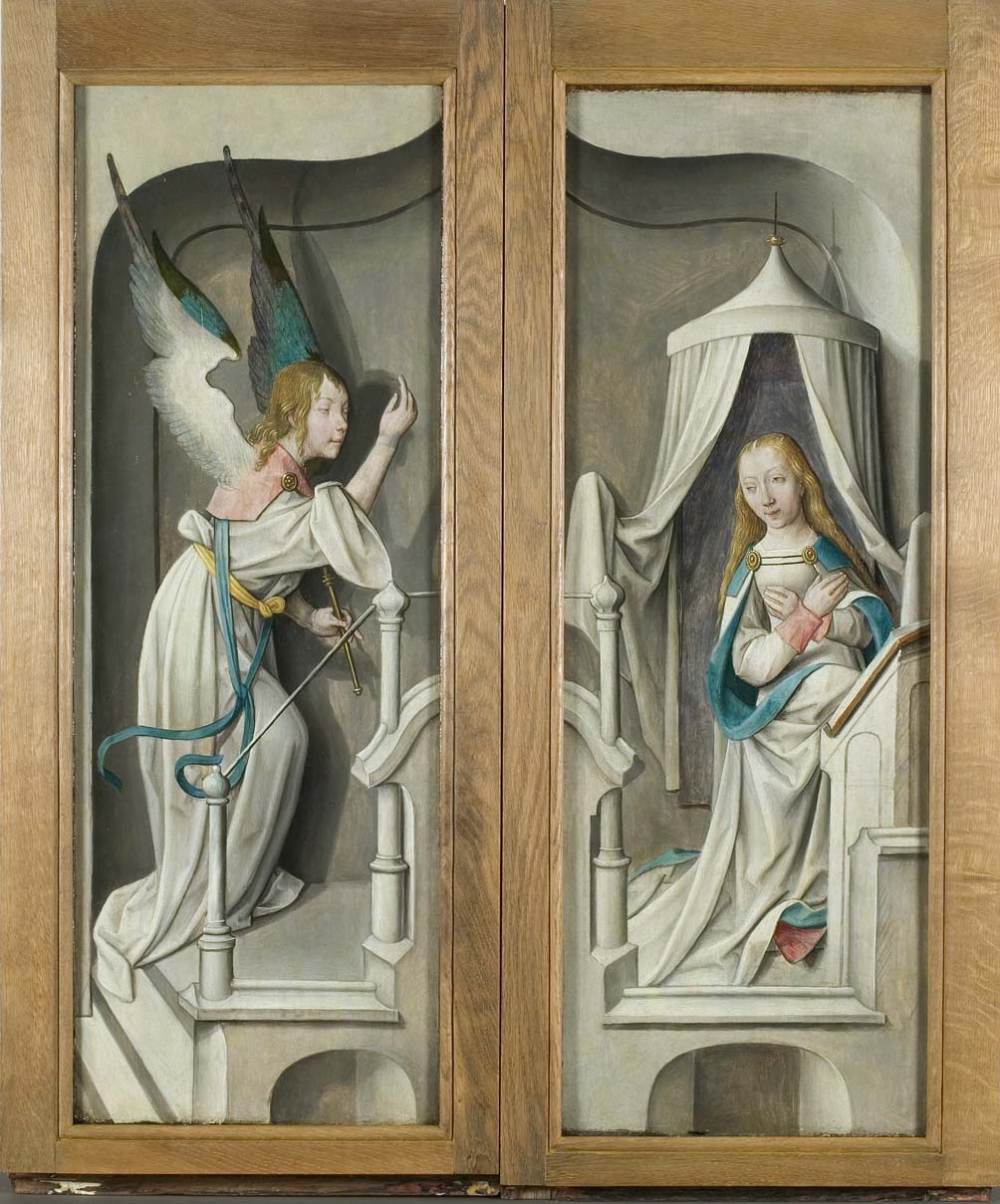
Closed view; the wings with an Annunciation

The Triptych with the Virgin and Child, Saints and Donors is a triptych depicting the Virgin Mary and Child Jesus, with several saints and an unidentified donor couple by the Master of Delft, created c. 1500-1510. It belongs to the Rijksmuseum, in Amsterdam, but is on long-term loan to the Museum Catharijneconvent, in Utrecht. The iconography of the central panel is unusual, and its meaning disputed.

The Master of Delft, at the tail-end of Early Netherlandish painting, was given his notname in 1913 by Max Jakob Friedländer, with this as one of the "founding group" of works attributed to him, now somewhat expanded, and given dates from the approximate range 1490 to 1520. This painting was previously described as "Haarlem school, c. 1510" when it first appeared on the modern art market in 1919, then as "Delft, c. 1500" in 1923. It was given to the Rijksmuseum in 1933. Dendrochronology suggests a date "in or after 1510". The main panel is 87.1 cm tall and 69.2 cm wide, the side ones 86.5 cm tall and 31.5 wide.

As was usual with triptychs, the side wings are hinged, and when closed a different view of the work is seen. Typically the painting was intended to be kept closed most of the time, but opened on special feasts or perhaps Sundays. In this case the closed wings show an Annunciation, mostly in grisaille except for the hair and other small areas. The wings were sawed through at the Rijksmuseum, so that the outsides could be displayed on their own.

== Description ==
The side wings have the kneeling donor couple, him to the left, her to the right, each with a standing saint behind, presenting them to the divine figures in the centre panel, a common arrangement. The bishop-saint on the left wing, probably Saint Martin of Tours, may be a disguised portrait of David of Burgundy, a bastard son of Duke Philip the Good of Burgundy, who was made Bishop of Utrecht. He died in 1496, although the portrait might be a posthumous memorial.

The female saint is probably the local Saint Cunera, in Christian legend the only one of Saint Ursula's thousand virgins to survive the massacre at Cologne, only later to be murdered at Rhenen near Utrecht. She was a princess from Orkney, and strangled with a scarf; in the painting she wears a crown and a scarf.

The central panel shows a hortus conclusus or small garden enclosed with a (very low) wall set in an urban scene with water and mountains in the distance. The Virgin sits near the front, with the Christ Child standing naked on her lap, holding her hair for support. There are several other figures, all female (or angelic) except for Saint Joseph at the back of the garden; his inclusion makes the painting one of the Holy Family. At the front and sitting on the wall are two exotically dressed women; according to the Rijkmuseum and other accounts these are saints, though hard to identify. Behind the Virgin a group of three angels are performing music, with bagpipes, a recorder, and the third singing from a musical score. Further back, and outside the garden, four women, none paying attention to those in the garden, seem to be ordinary inhabitants of the setting going about their lives.

== Vision ==
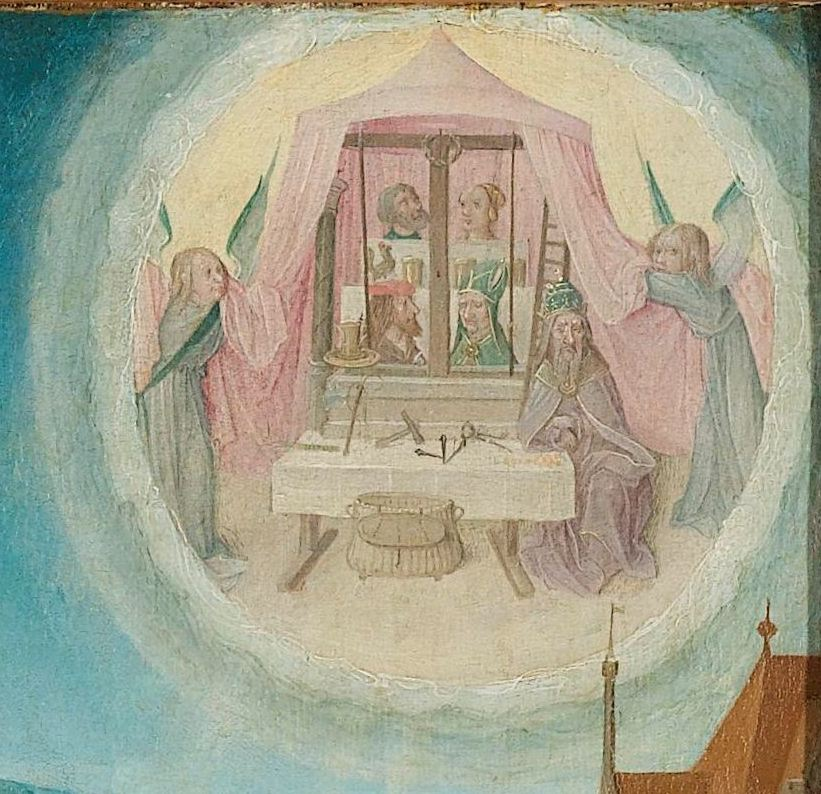
The vision; angels reveal the Arma Christi, or Instruments of the Passion

In the sky, a vision shows the Arma Christi, or Instruments of the Passion, in a tent whose hangings are pulled back by angels. The scene is unusual in iconography, and has been explained by one scholar, S. Ringbom, in an interpretation not yet generally accepted, and recognised but not agreed by Jan Piet Filedt Kok in his Rijksmuseum catalogue. According to Ringbom, rather than being saints, the two women at the front of the gardens are sibyls. She finds "suggestive" of this "their dress and, in particular, their fancy headgear: helmet-like contraptions vaguely alluding to antiquity and the Orient". Ringbom explores the possibility that the women in the background are also sibyls, but concludes that this is unlikely.

The only figures clearly looking at the vision are the left-hand sibyl and the Christ Child. Ringbom suggests that the sibyl has summoned her vision and made it visible to the child. This parallels the best-known Christian legend involving a sibyl, that of Augustus and the Tiburtine Sibyl, which was especially popular in later Early Netherlandish painting (for example several early works of Jan Mostaert include it in the background). There the vision is usually said to be the enthroned Virgin and Child. In this painting, the unspecified sibyl on the left, with an open book presumably recording her prophecies, is showing the Christ Child, and apparently him alone, the emblems of his future Passion.

Though this conception would be a "true innovation" in iconography, the vision depicted may correspond with one given by the early 4th-century Church Father Lactantius; as Saint Augustine complains he fails to specify which sibyl had the vision. This lacks the specific late medieval idea of the arma Christi, but ends "inhospitalitatis hanc mostrabunt mensam" ("such is the inhospitable board [or "table"] that they will set before him"), which the table in the vision seems to echo. God the Father sits rather casually at the table, his finger pointing at the instruments on the table. A comparable depiction, but with no sibyls, is seen in an anonymous Adoration of the Magi in Antwerp, where angels carrying the instruments hover in the sky.

Older photographs and descriptions of the painting's wooden frame, which is original, show inscribed below the centre panel Dolor meus in conspectu meo sempre ("my sorrow is continually before me") from the Vulgate of Psalm 37:17, which reflects the vision. This appears to have been removed in the 1920s. The table in the vision may also reflect Hebrews, 9:11.

== The Annunciation ==
The depiction of the Annunciation is also innovative, in that the archangel is apparently at the top of "a short flight of stairs, and the Virgin is seated beneath a baldachin". As this closed view was presumably exposed to more sunlight over the centuries, the pale colours are partly, but not wholly, due to fading of the pigments.

== Details and comparison ==
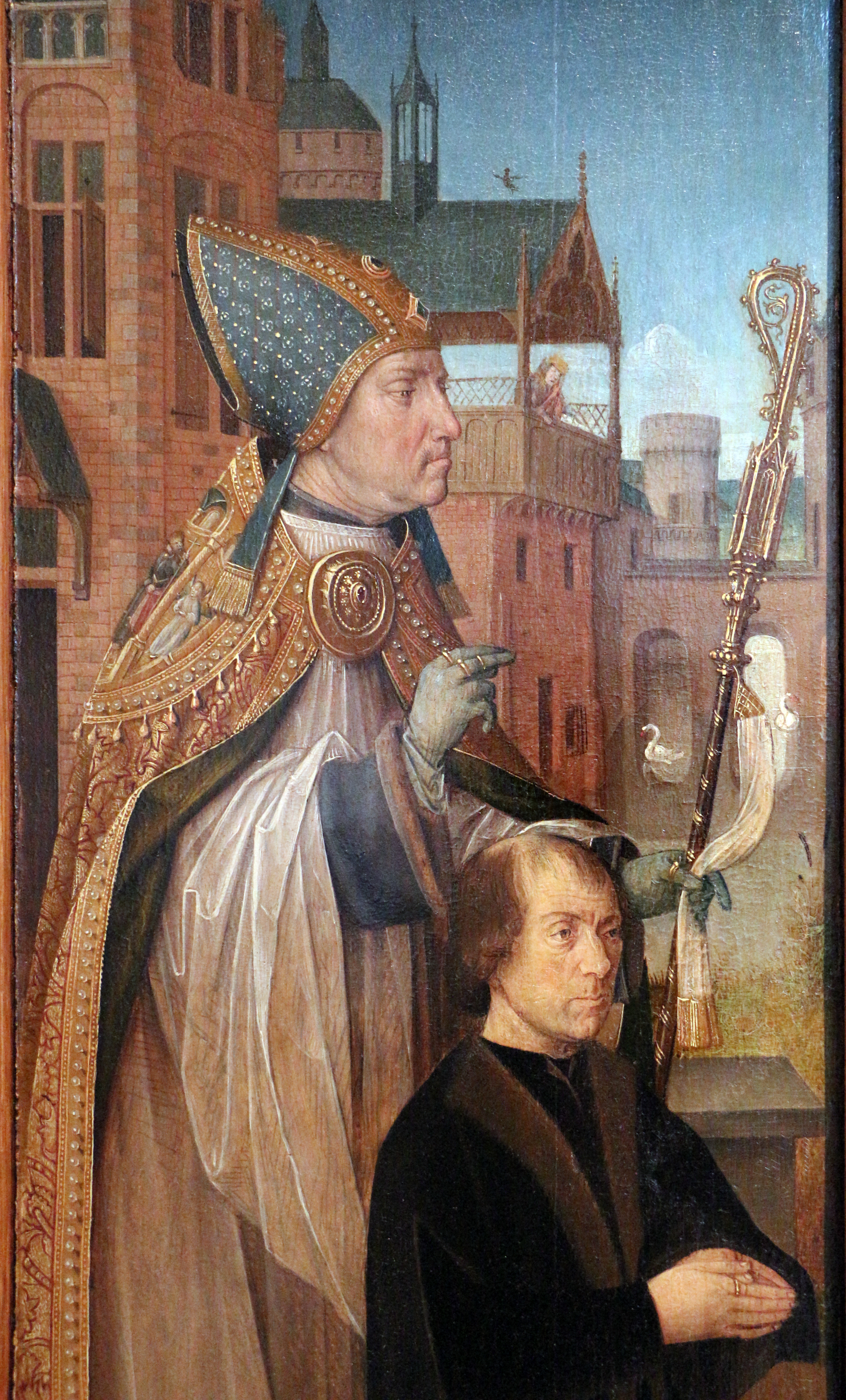
Detail of left wing

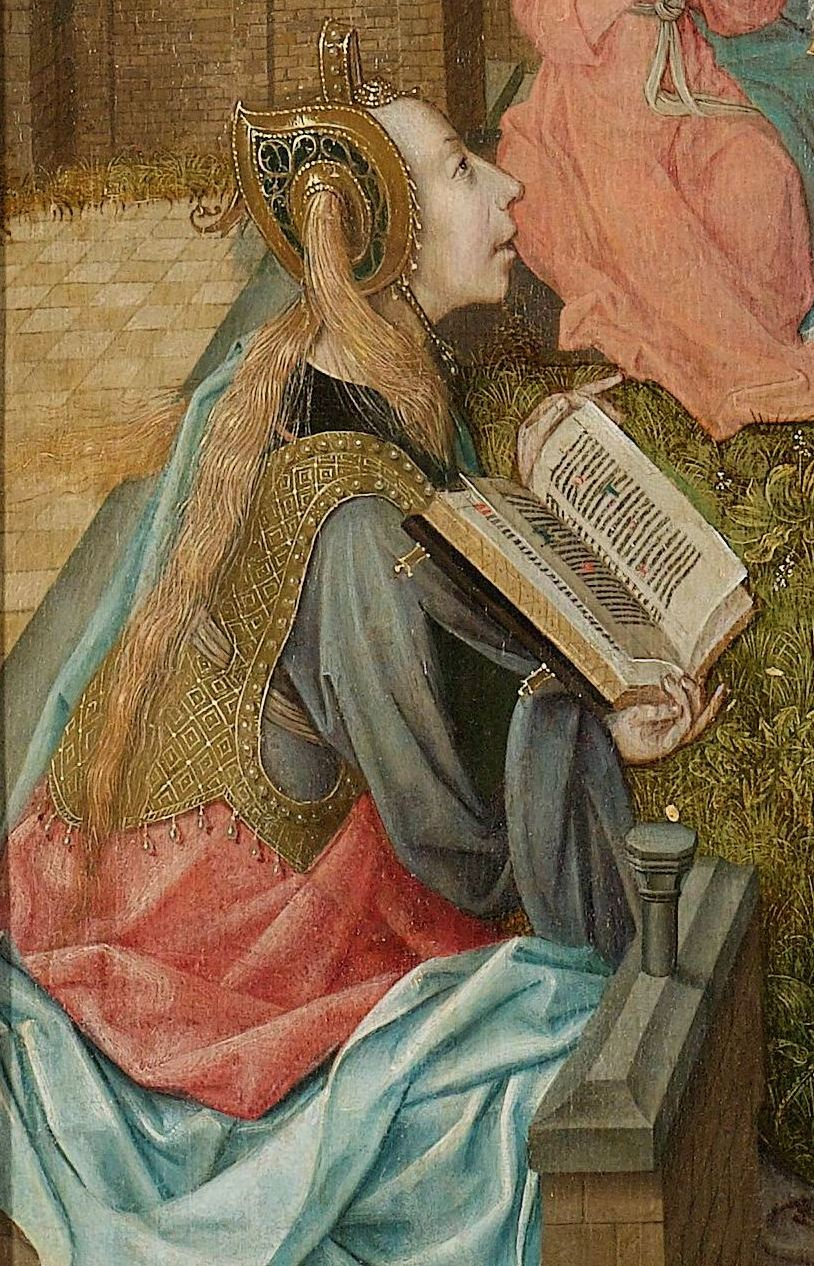
Saint or sibyl?

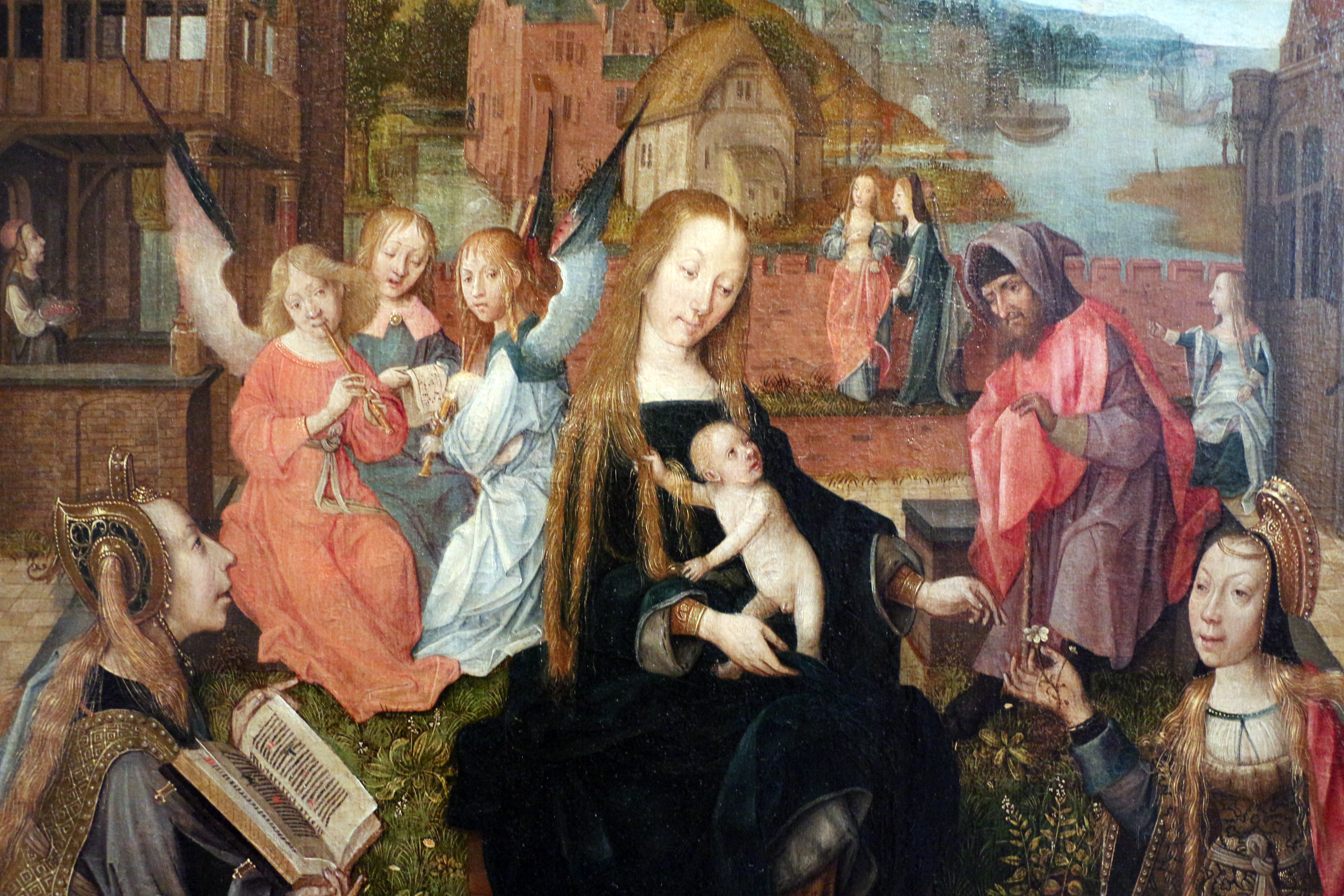
Main panel group

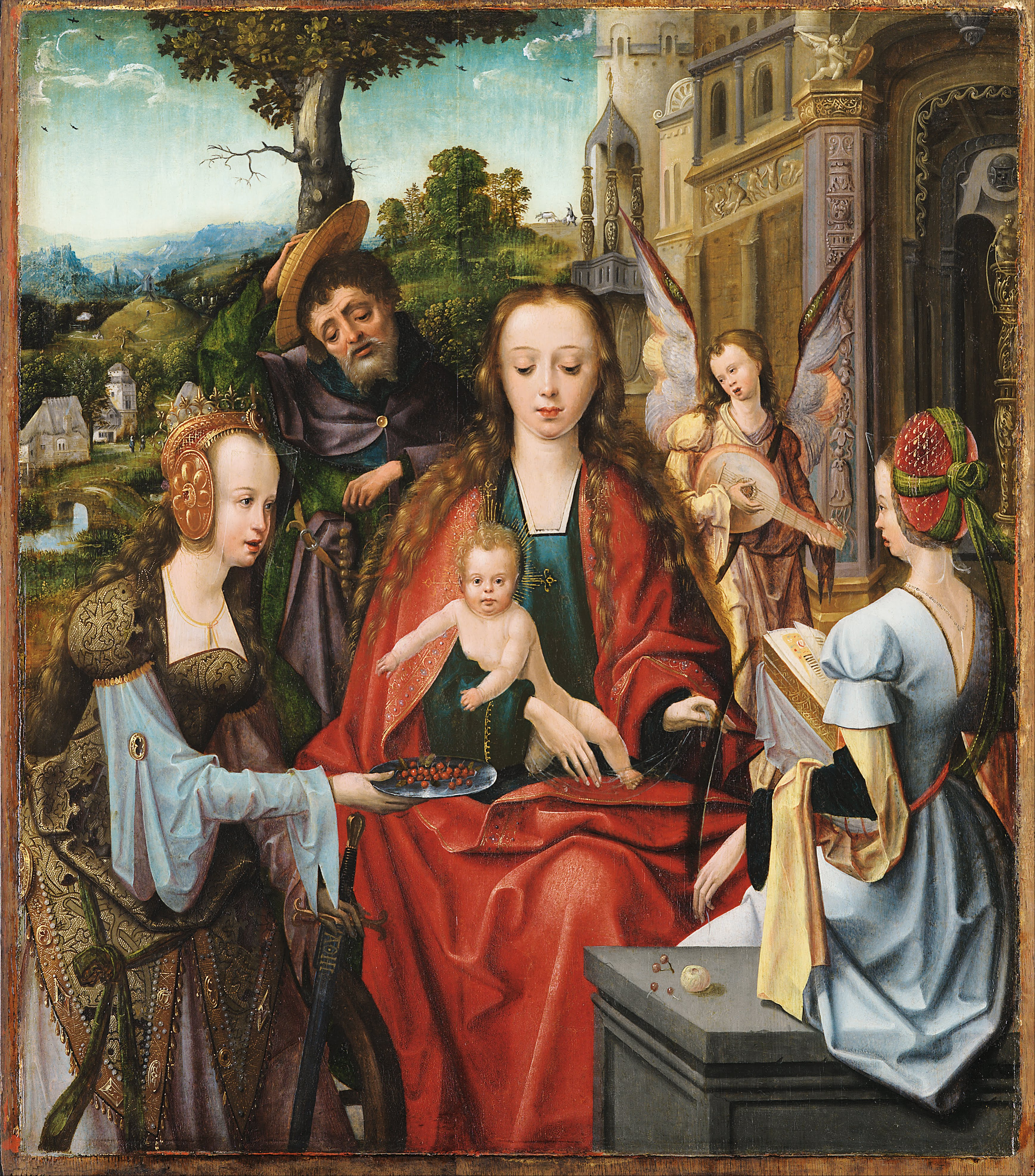
Master of the Antwerp Adoration (and workshop), The Holy Family with Two Saints, c. 1520
