= John Guise (British Army officer, died 1765) =

British Army officer and art collector

General John Guise
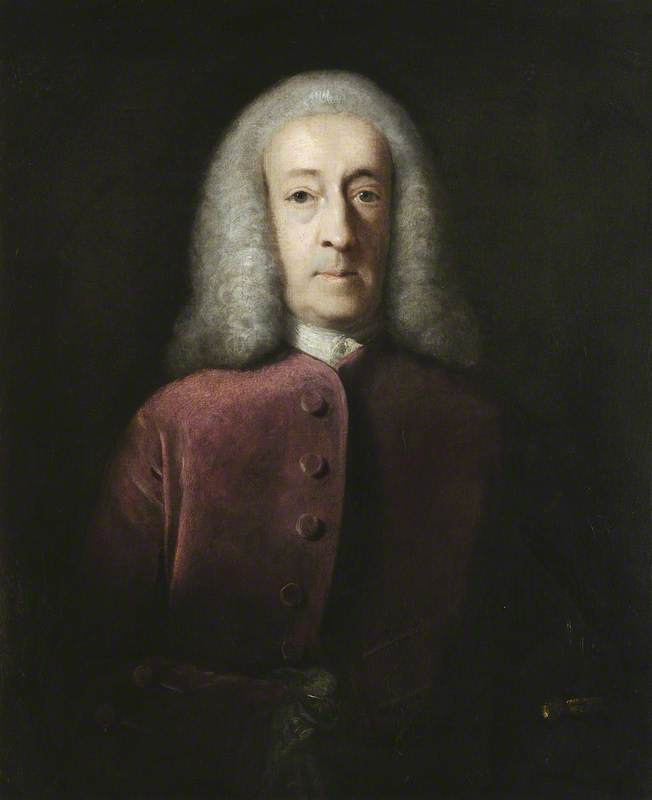
- Portrait by Sir Joshua Reynolds
- Born: 1682/83
- Died: 12 June 1765

John Guise (1682 or 1683 – 12 June 1765) was a British Army officer and art collector.

== Art collector ==
He was educated at Christ Church, Oxford from 1702 to which he later bequeathed his large collection of over 200 paintings and almost 2,000 drawings by artists such as Leonardo da Vinci, Michelangelo and Raphael - one such work is Annibale Carracci's Madonna and Child in Glory over the City of Bologna. Since 1968 they have been housed in the Christ Church Picture Gallery. In 1719 he was one of the original backers of the Royal Academy of Music, establishing a London opera company which commissioned numerous works from Handel and others.

== Military career ==
He obtained a practical knowledge of the profession of arms in the wars of Queen Anne. He served many years in the 1st Regiment of Foot Guards, and was promoted to the lieutenant-colonelcy of that regiment in 1736. On 1 November 1738 King George II rewarded him with the colonelcy of the 6th Regiment of Foot. In 1739 he was promoted to the rank of brigadier-general, and served as one of the senior officers during the unsuccessful Siege of Cartagena during the War of Jenkins' Ear in 1741.

Further promotions took place in 1742 to that of major-general, in 1745 to that of lieutenant-general, and in 1762 to that of general. He held the appointment of governor of Berwick several years, and died in June 1765.
