= Madonna and Child with St Francis =

Painting by Antonio da Correggio

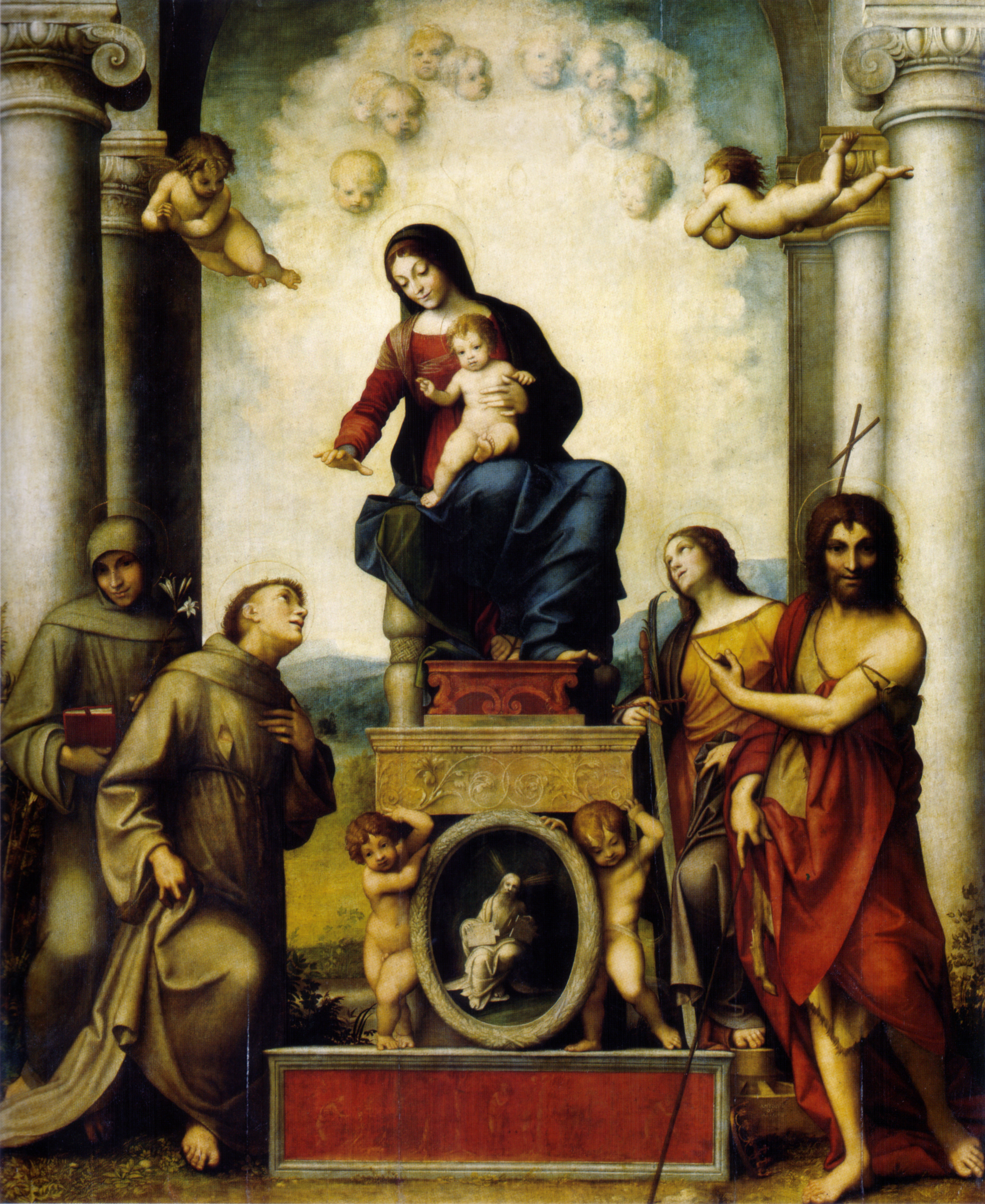
- Artist: Antonio da Correggio
- Year: 1514–15
- Type: oil on panel
- Dimensions: 299 cm × 245 cm (118 in × 96 in)
- Location: Gemäldegalerie Alte Meister, Dresden, Germany

Madonna and Child with St Francis or Madonna of St Francis is a 1514–1515 painting by the Italian Renaissance painter Correggio, now held in the Gemäldegalerie Alte Meister in Dresden, Germany. It shows Francis of Assisi, with the stigmata, prostrating himself before an enthroned Madonna and Child - the work's theme is the intercession of the Madonna, which was promoted by the Franciscans after the definition of the dogma of the Immaculate Conception in 1473. Francis is supported by Anthony of Padua, whilst on the right are Catherine of Alexandria and John the Baptist and on the base of the Madonna's throne is a small grisaille image of Moses with the tablets of the law. Catherine's wheel bears the painter's signature "Antonivs de Alegri F.[ecit]".

== History ==
The contract for the work (Correggio's first major commission) was signed by the artist on 30 August 1514, with the consent of his father, and of brother Girolamo Cattania, the guardian of the Franciscan convent in the town of Correggio, Emilia-Romagna, whose church was dedicated to St Francis. The work was probably meant as the high altarpiece for the convent church – that altar was site of the Da Correggio family vault. He was paid for it on 4 April 1515, showing how fast he produced it. The contract and payment records for this painting provide the first documentary evidence of his career.

Just before 1638 the painting was confiscated by Francesco I d'Este and taken to the Palazzo Ducale in Modena, where it hung alongside five other Correggios seized from the duchy's territory. In 1746 the impoverished Francesco III d'Este tried to raise some money by selling the hundred most famous works in the Galleria Estense, including the six Correggios, to Augustus III of Saxony.

== Bibliography ==
- (in Italian) Giuseppe Adani, Correggio pittore universale, Silvana Editoriale, Correggio 2007. ISBN 9788836609772
