= Christ Church Picture Gallery =

Coordinates: 51.7507°N 1.2545°W

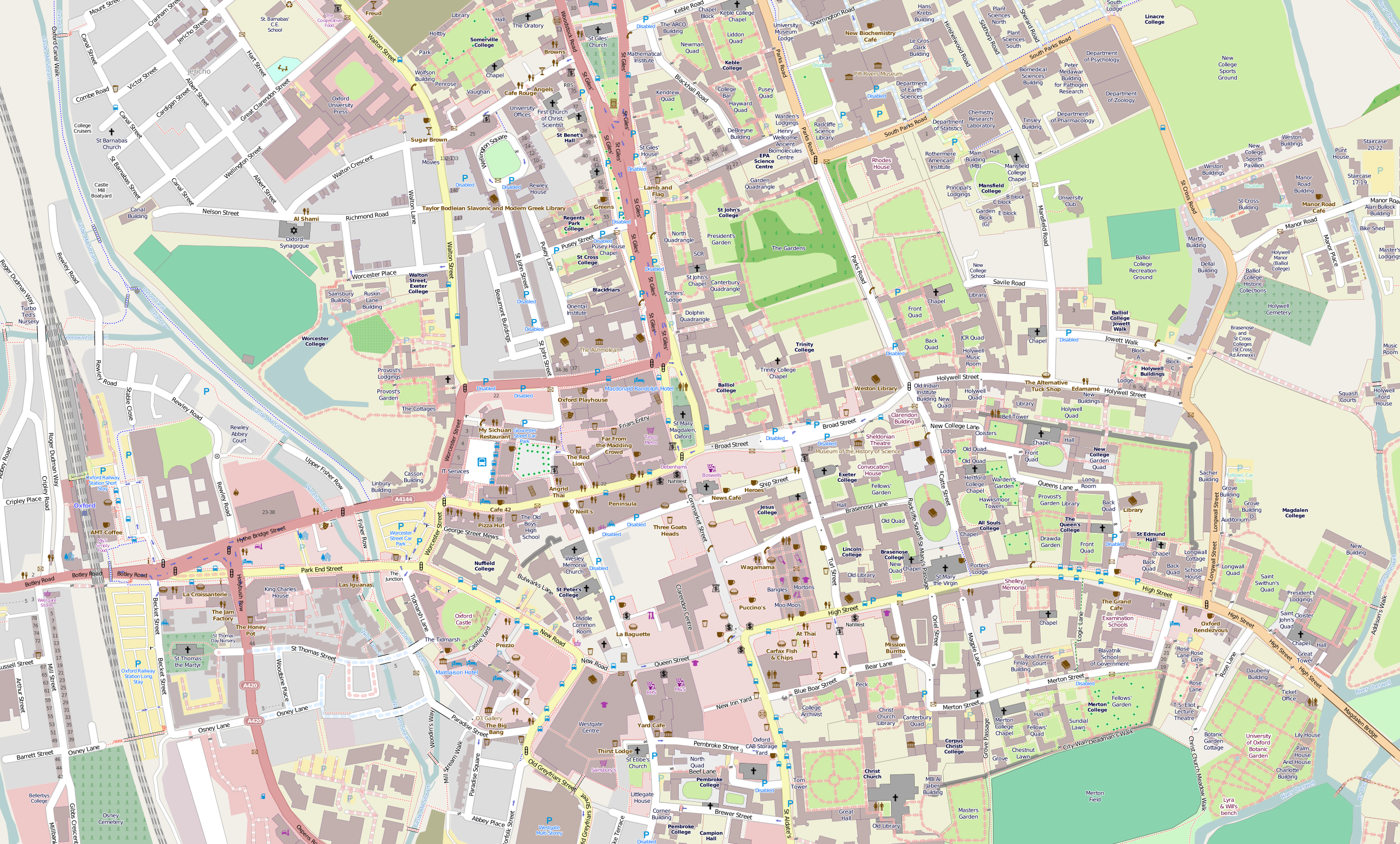
- Location within Oxford
- Established: 1968
- Location: Oxford, England
- Type: Art museum
- Website: www.chch.ox.ac.uk/gallery

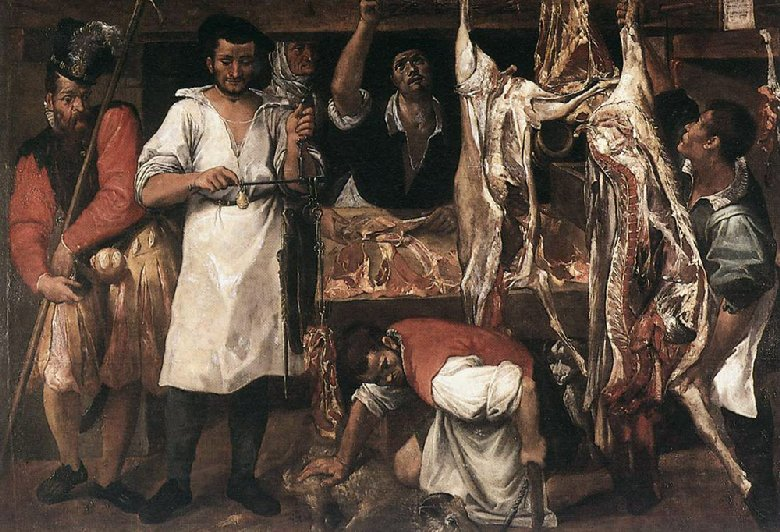
Butcher's Shop by Annibale Carracci, c.1583, one of the paintings by Caracci in the gallery.

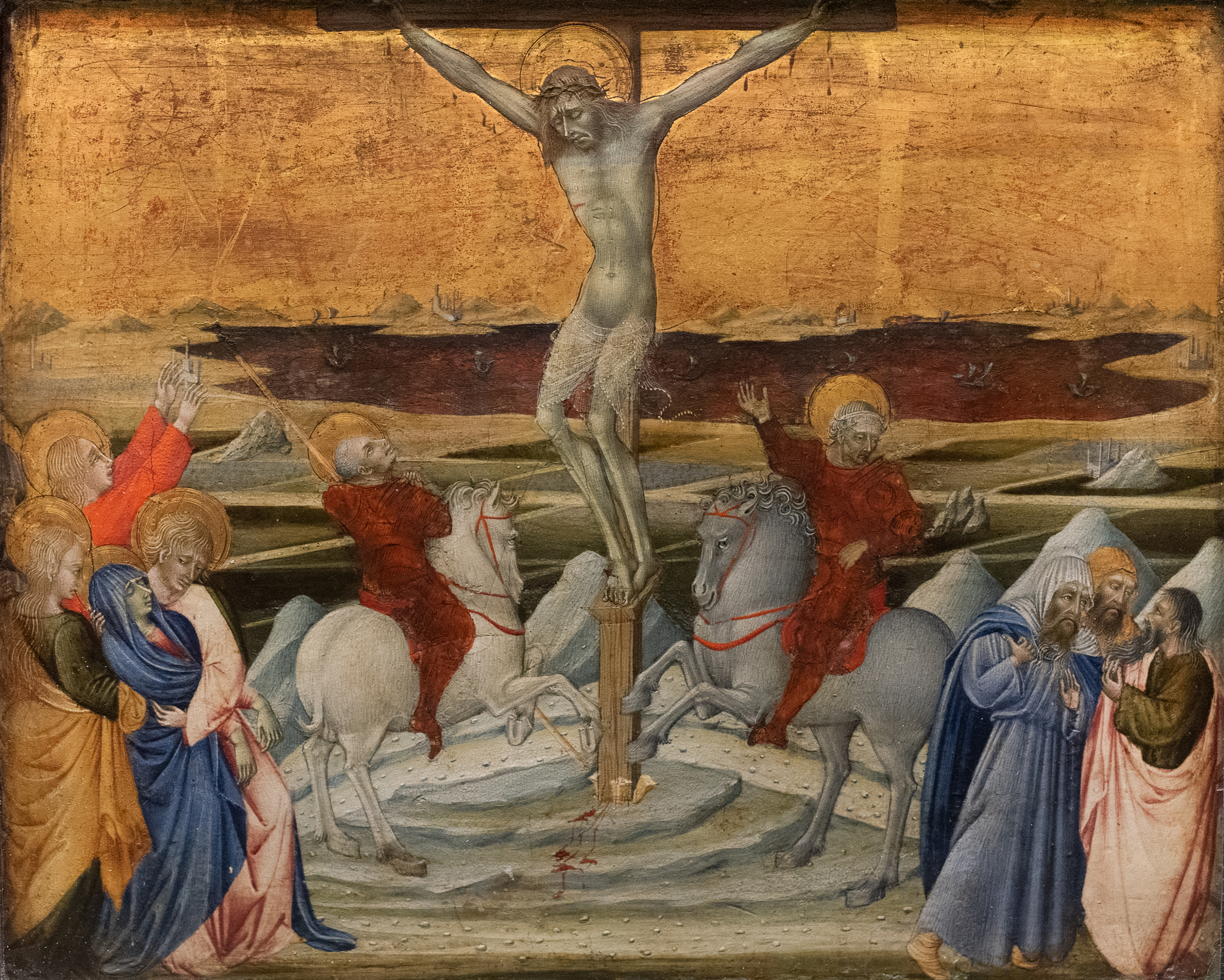
Calvary by Giovanni di Paolo, c.1450.

Christ Church Picture Gallery is an art gallery located inside Christ Church, a college of the University of Oxford in Oxford, England. The gallery holds an important collection of about 300 Old Master paintings and nearly 2,000 drawings.

The gallery consists largely of Italian art from the 14th to 18th centuries. including paintings by famous artists such as Fra Angelico, Salvator Rosa and Paolo Veronese. The gallery also holds drawings by Raphael, Albrecht Dürer, Michelangelo, and a great range of other Italian and European artists, as well as a collection of Russian icons.

The greater part of the collection was bequeathed by a former member of the college, General John Guise, arriving after his death in 1765. Since then, the collection has been supplemented by several bequests, notably from William Fox-Strangways and Walter Savage Landor, both of thom donated 14th and 15th-century Italian paintings.

The gallery is open to the public.

== History ==
The picture gallery's collection was started by a bequest of 184 paintings and around 2000 drawings from General John Guise, a former Christ Church undergraduate and British army officer who had fought at the Battle of Oudenarde. His bequest consisted of Italian paintings from the 16th and 17th centuries, with painters such as Tintoretto, Annibale Carracci and Paolo Veronese represented. The 14th and 15th-century paintings were donated by W. T. H. Fox-Strangways and Walter Savage Landor. Both men had lived in Florence in the 1820s and 1830s where they collected art.

Smaller bequests were made by Lord Frederick Campbell, Sir Richard Nosworthy, and others. C. R. Patterson donated his collection of 18th and 19th-century Russian icons.

=== 2020 theft ===
On 14 March 2020, burglars broke into the gallery by night and stole 3 paintings; Salvator Rosa's A Rocky Coast, with Soldiers Studying a Plan, Anthony van Dyck's A Soldier on Horseback, and Annibale Carracci's A Boy Drinking. The estimated value of the stolen paintings is over £10 million. As of October 2025 A Rocky Coast, with Soldiers Studying a Plan has been returned, the other two paintings remain missing.

== Building ==
The gallery is accessed inside Christ Church, Oxford, in the Canterbury Quadrangle near Oriel Square. The current building was designed by Philip Powell and Hidalgo Moya, and was opened in 1968. After the current building opened, the gallery first became open to the public.
