= The Vision of Saint Bernard =

The Vision of Saint Bernard may refer to:

- The Vision of Saint Bernard (Fra Bartolomeo)
- The Vision of Saint Bernard (Filippino Lippi)
- The Vision of Saint Bernard (Perugino)

== See also ==
- The Apparition of the Virgin to Saint Bernard (Murillo)
- Christ Embracing Saint Bernard
