= Saint Bernard of Clairvaux Curing a Cripple =

Painting by Francisco Goya

- San Bernardo de Claraval curando a un tullido (Spanish)
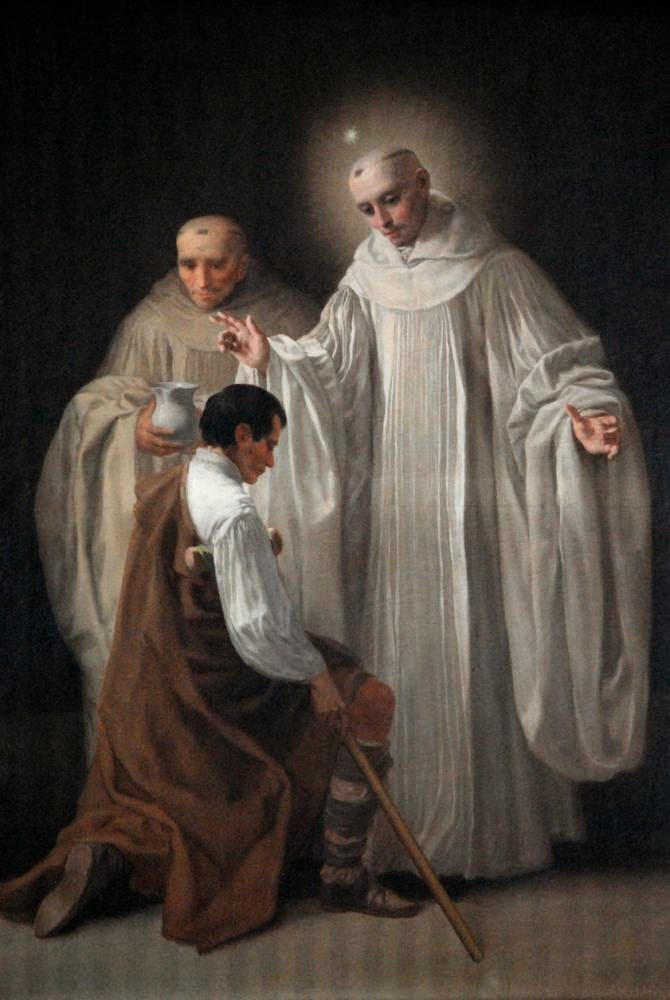
- Artist: Francisco Goya
- Year: 1787
- Medium: Oil on canvas
- Dimensions: 220 cm × 160 cm (87 in × 63 in)
- Location: Royal Monastery of Saint Joachim and Saint Anne, Valladolid
- Owner: Cistercian Congregation of Saint Bernard

Saint Bernard of Clairvaux Curing a Cripple is an oil on canvas painting by Spanish artist Francisco Goya, created in 1787, now held at the Royal Monastery of Saint Joachim and Saint Anne of Valladolid. The picture is markedly Academic, predating the upcoming Romanticism of Goya's work. Francisco de Zurbarán and Francesco Sabatini have been mentioned as influences on its creation.

The work has been given different names. Goya painted it under commission of Sabatini, along with an image of Saint Joseph and other of Lutgardis, as decoration for the mentioned nunnery. The restoration of the convent began in 1777 with the approval of king Charles III of Spain. Goya and Ramón Bayeu were asked a total of 6 paintings as the old decorations did not fit the size of the restored building.

The artwork depicts a miraculous healing by cistercian saint Bernard of Clairvaux at Milan, allegedly performed after blessing bread and water given in charity to the needy.

The painting was displayed twice at the Las Edades del Hombre exhibition.

== See also ==
- List of works by Francisco Goya
- Saint Bernard and the Virgin, by Alonso Cano.
- The Three Generations, by Francisco Goya.
