= Casa Pazzi Madonna =

Painting by Andrea del Castagno

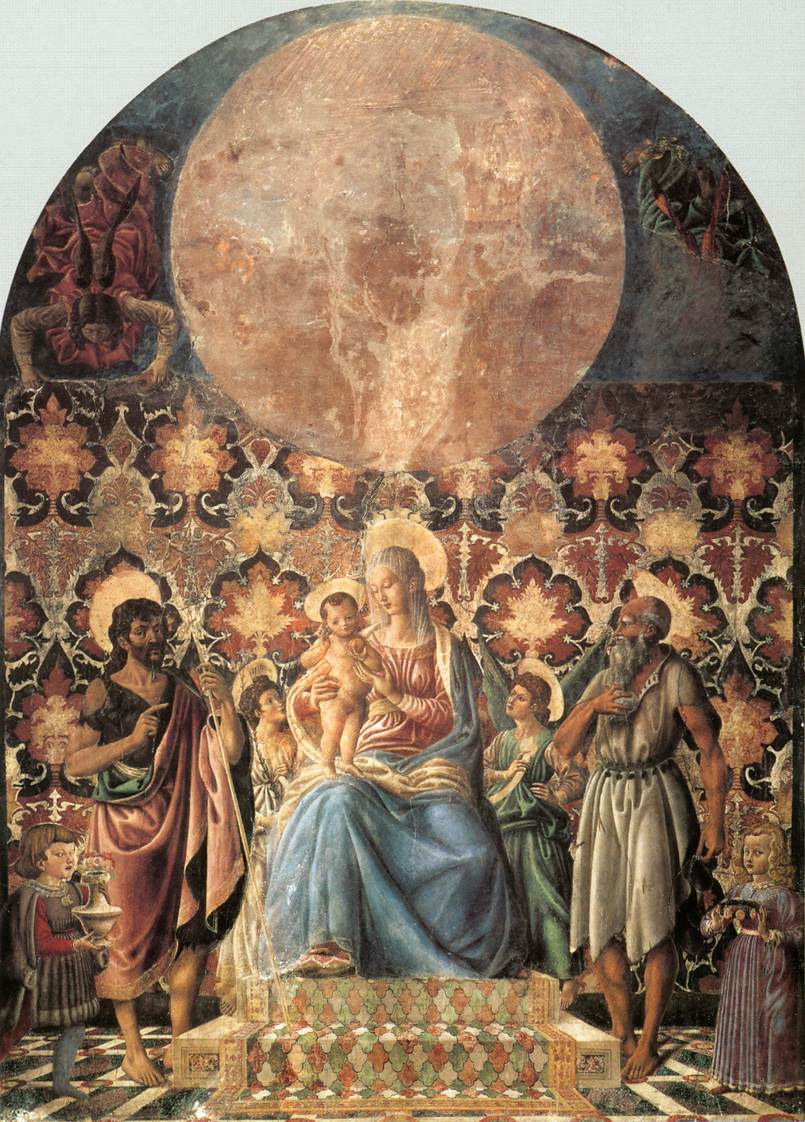
Casa Pazzi Madonna (1443) by Andrea del Castagno

The Casa Pazzi Madonna is a fresco fragment by Andrea del Castagno, created in 1443, originally the altarpiece of the chapel of Santa Brigida at the castello del Trebbio in the Pontassieve district, then owned by Andrea de' Pazzi, hence the painting's name. Removed from the wall in the 19th century it is now in the Contini Bonacossi collection within the Uffizi in Florence.

== History ==
The fresco comes from the altar of the chapel in the Trebbio castle of Santa Brigida, a hamlet of Pontassieve, at the time owned by Andrea de 'Pazzi. It was detached from the wall in the 19th century and at the time it was complained that "a garland of angelic heads" had been left in the opening of the arch, which completed the composition. The damage in the upper part of the composition is evident, especially on the right.

The work is believed to have been made in 1443, just after the artist's return to Florence after his stay in Venice, as suggested by the stylistic analysis and by the presence of twins. At that time in fact Andrea de 'Pazzi had two twin children at 'about 6 years old, called Niccolò and Oretta and born in 1437.

== Description ==
The work depicts a sacred conversation, with the Madonna and Child seated on a throne, surrounded by two angels, the Saints John the Baptist and Jerome and, at the left and right sides, two male and female children carrying a vase of flowers and a garland respectively.

The background, made of a sumptuous drape with golden arabesques, held up by two angels depicted flying almost upside down, is striking. The richness of this type of ornamentation certainly dates back to the Venetian environment, still influenced by the Byzantine tradition.

The face of the Virgin recalls the works of Fra Angelico, especially the San Marco Altarpiece (1438-1439), with which it has some common elements, such as the carpet.

In the medallion above the Virgin, now empty, there must have been a table or a bas-relief, perhaps a coat of arms, or a window, since then lost.
