= The Apparition of the Virgin to Saint Bernard (Murillo) =

Painting by Bartolomé Esteban Murillo

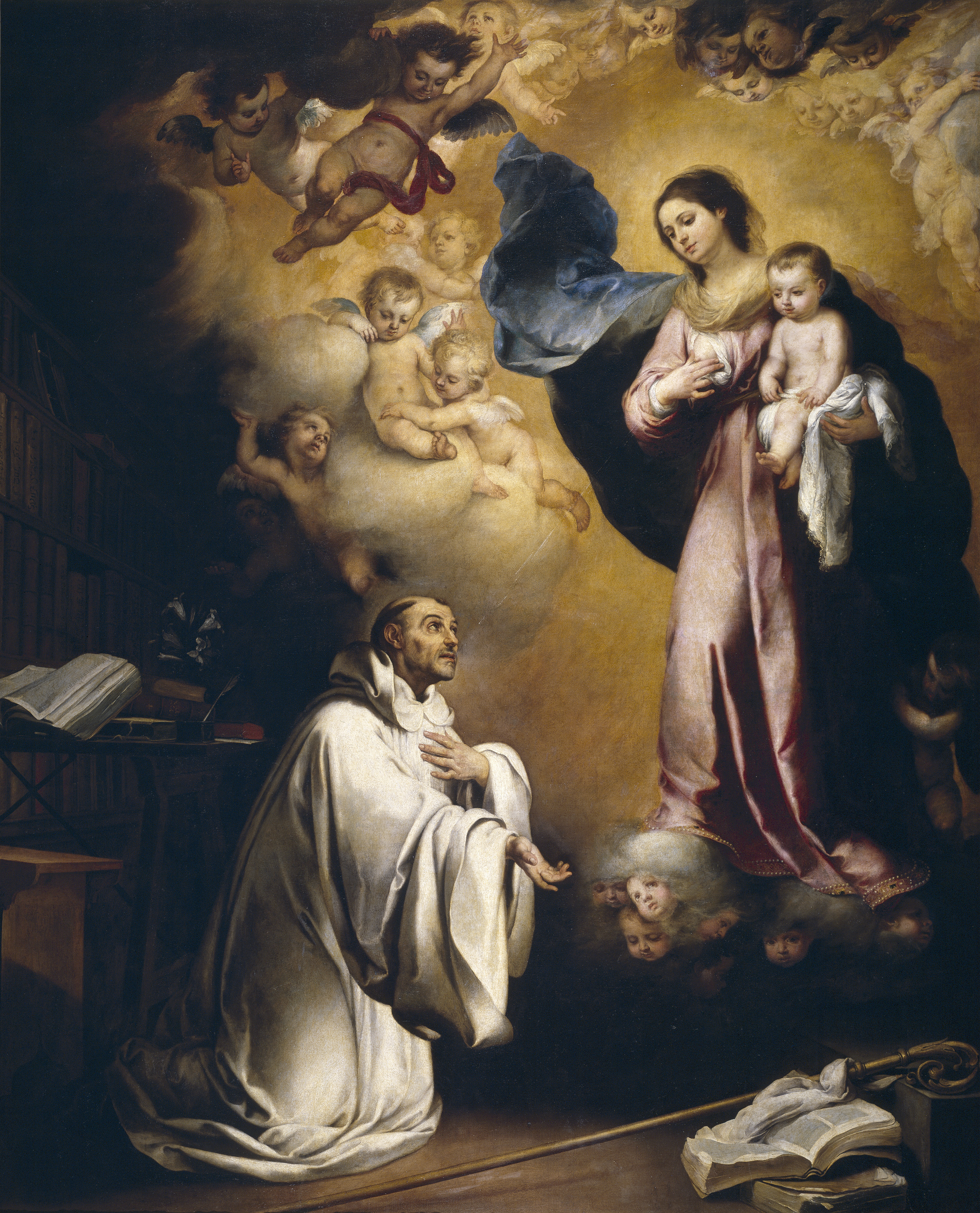
- Artist: Bartolomé Esteban Murillo
- Year: c. 1655
- Catalogue: P000978
- Medium: Oil on canvas
- Movement: Tenebrism
- Subject: Lactatio Bernardi
- Dimensions: 311 cm × 249 cm (122 in × 98 in)

The Apparition of the Virgin to Saint Bernard is an oil on canvas painting by Spanish artist Bartolomé Esteban Murillo, created c. 1655, now held in the Museo del Prado in Madrid. The picture shows a miraculous Marian apparition to Catholic theologian Bernard of Clairvaux during his study time, what causes him to fall on his knees. His books and desk can be seen in the background.

== History ==
The work is one of the most important tenebrist paintings of the author. It was paired with another similar artwork, The Apparition of the Virgin to Saint Ildefonsus, and both were probably commissioned as altar pieces for a cistercian convent, despite there is no trace of their origin. Historians of art disagree on its creation date: some claim it was created before 1655, while others believe it could have been painted up to 1670.

It has been speculated that the picture may have been modeled after a similar painting by Juan de las Roelas, displayed at the Hospital of Saint Bernard at Seville, considering the common attributes of both. However, Murillo does not follow Roelas' austerity and prefers to depict the scene in a baroque and majestic style.

The painting was first inventoried in 1746 at the Palace of La Granja, what points to a purchase by the Queen of Spain close to 1730, a period in which Philip V's royal court was located at Seville.

== Content ==
The artwork depicts the Lactatio Bernardi miracle, a scene in the Catholic mystical tradition in which the Virgin Mary supposedly appeared to Bernard of Clairvaux and shot a drop of milk as a prize for the theologian's work.

The painting is organized on a diagonal axis and stresses the contrast between the monk's cell and the heavens where the Virgin appears. A desk with an open book, bookshelves and an inkpot can be seen in the background. There is a vase of lilies close to the book, a flower that symbolizes the Immaculate Conception. In the floor, a crosier and a pile of books are depicted.

The Virgin is painted in a baroque style. Her figure is surrounded by angels, as in most of Murillo's paintings.

== See also ==
- Apparition of the Virgin to St Bernard (Fra Bartolomeo)
- Apparition of the Virgin to St Bernard (Lippi)
- Spanish Golden Age
