= Madonna and Child with Saints Luke and Catherine of Alexandria =

Painting by Titian

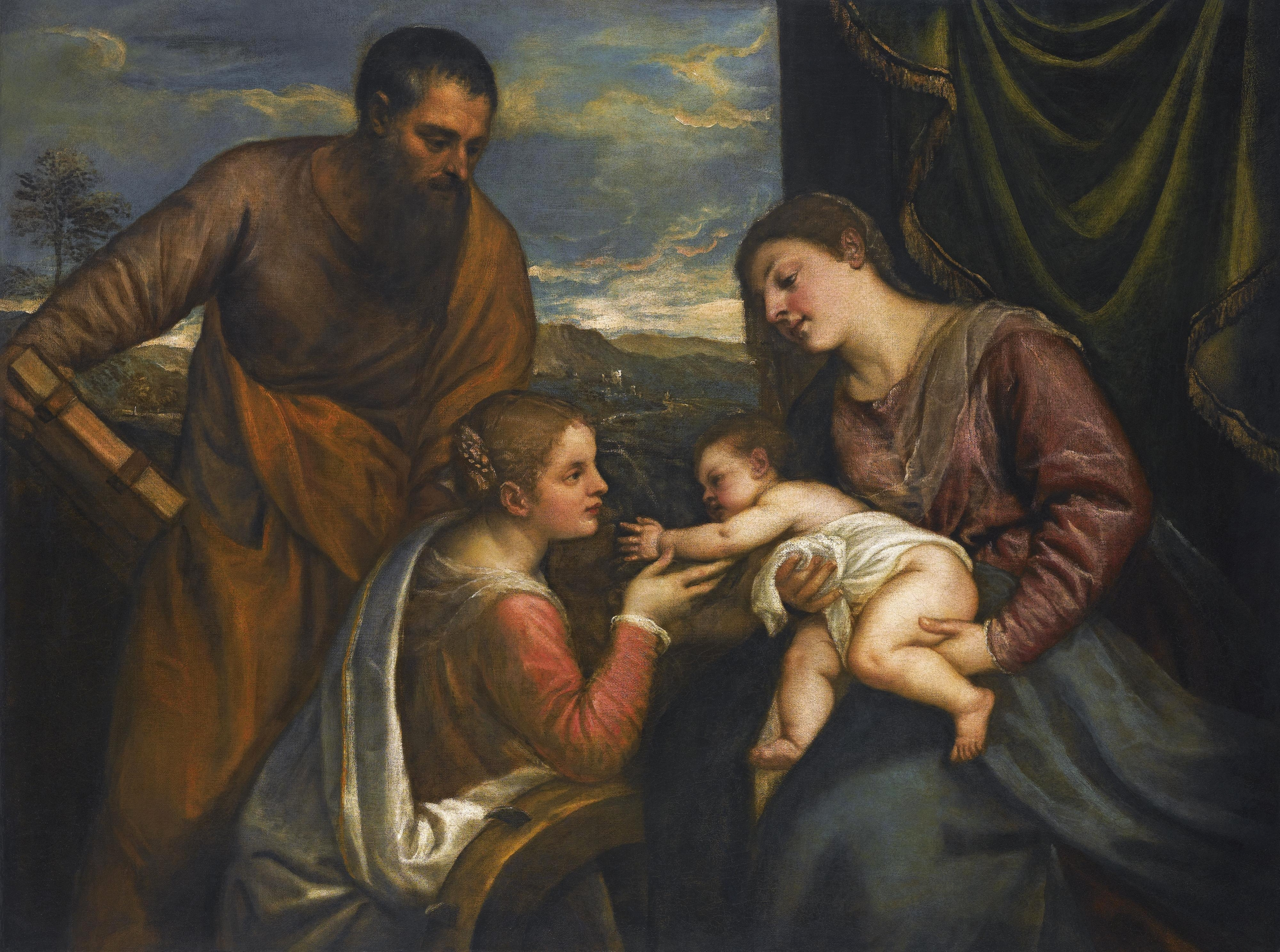
- Artist: Titian
- Year: c. 1560
- Medium: Oil on canvas
- Dimensions: 127.8 cm × 169.7 cm (4.19 ft × 5.57 ft)
- Owner: Private collection

The Madonna and Child with Saints Luke and Catherine of Alexandria, also known simply as Holy Conversation, is a painting by the Italian Renaissance master Titian. It is one of his several versions of the canonical image of the Madonna and Child.

Executed in oil on canvas, it was painted around 1560, at the height of Titian's career. In 2011, the painting achieved the highest auction price ever for one of Titian's works, at $16.9 million. The painting was sold by Gerlinda Kisters, who had inherited it from her husband, Heinz Kisters, who died in 1977.

== Description ==
The Madonna and Child with Saints Luke and Catherine of Alexandria is a mature work executed when Titian was at the height of his artistic powers and fame.

Christ is depicted as a playful baby, slightly off balance as He tips forward with arms outstretched towards Catherine, who in turn leans gently towards Him.

It is suggested that members of Titian's Venice workshop probably painted the curtain and Luke, because of the lower quality of those parts.

== History ==
The work was painted around 1560, rarely appearing in public at exhibitions or auctions. It is traditionally said to have been painted for the artist's friend, the Dondi dell'Orologio family of Padua. It was not exhibited in public from the late 1970s, until it was offered for auction in 2011.

The painting remained in the Dondi dell'Orologio family until Sir Richard Worsley purchased it during his stay in Italy as the last British Resident of Venice, a position he held from 1793 to 1797. The ship which was transporting the work back to England on was captured by a French privateer. The painting was acquired by Lucien Bonaparte, then the Napoleonic Ambassador to Madrid.

By 1814, after four years exile in England, Lucien Bonaparte was facing growing financial difficulties and sold the painting at auction in London. The painting then became the property of Sir John Rae Reid, a Conservative politician, financier and a Governor of the Bank of England. By 1936, by marriage and inheritance, the painting had become a part of the Panshanger Estate in Hertfordshire, England, and hung in the estates gallery, owned by Baron and Lady Desborough. Ettie Desborough was one of the most famous society hostesses of her age. She frequently hosted meetings of the celebrated aristocratic, political and literary figures known as "The Souls" at the Desborough residence, with visitors including Henry Irving, Vita Sackville-West, Edward VII, H. G. Wells, Edith Wharton and Oscar Wilde.

Although Lady Desborough had three sons and a daughter and the succession and survival of Panshanger's grand collection of art seemed secure, two of her sons were killed in the First World War and the third in a car accident in 1926, leaving no obvious heir to the estate. After her death in May 1952, Panshanger was sold to a demolition contractor for £17,750 and subsequently destroyed. A portion of the art collection passed to Lady Desborough's daughter, Lady Imogen, who married the 6th Viscount Gage in 1931. However, most of Panshanger's contents, including the Holy Conversation, were auctioned at Christie's in 1954.

In 1956, Heinz Kisters, a German businessman living in Switzerland, acquired the painting from the New York art dealers who had purchased the painting at the Christie's auction. When he died in 1977, the painting became the property of his widow, Gerlinda Kisters.

In 2011, the painting was sold at auction by Sothebys New York on behalf of the Heinz Kisters Foundation, which promotes and preserves the works of art in Heinz Kisters' collection.

The painting achieved the highest auction price ever for one of Titian's works, at $16.9 million, when it was sold at Sotheby's to a European telephone bidder on 28 January 2011.

== See also ==
- List of works by Titian
