= Sacra conversazione =

Painting genre

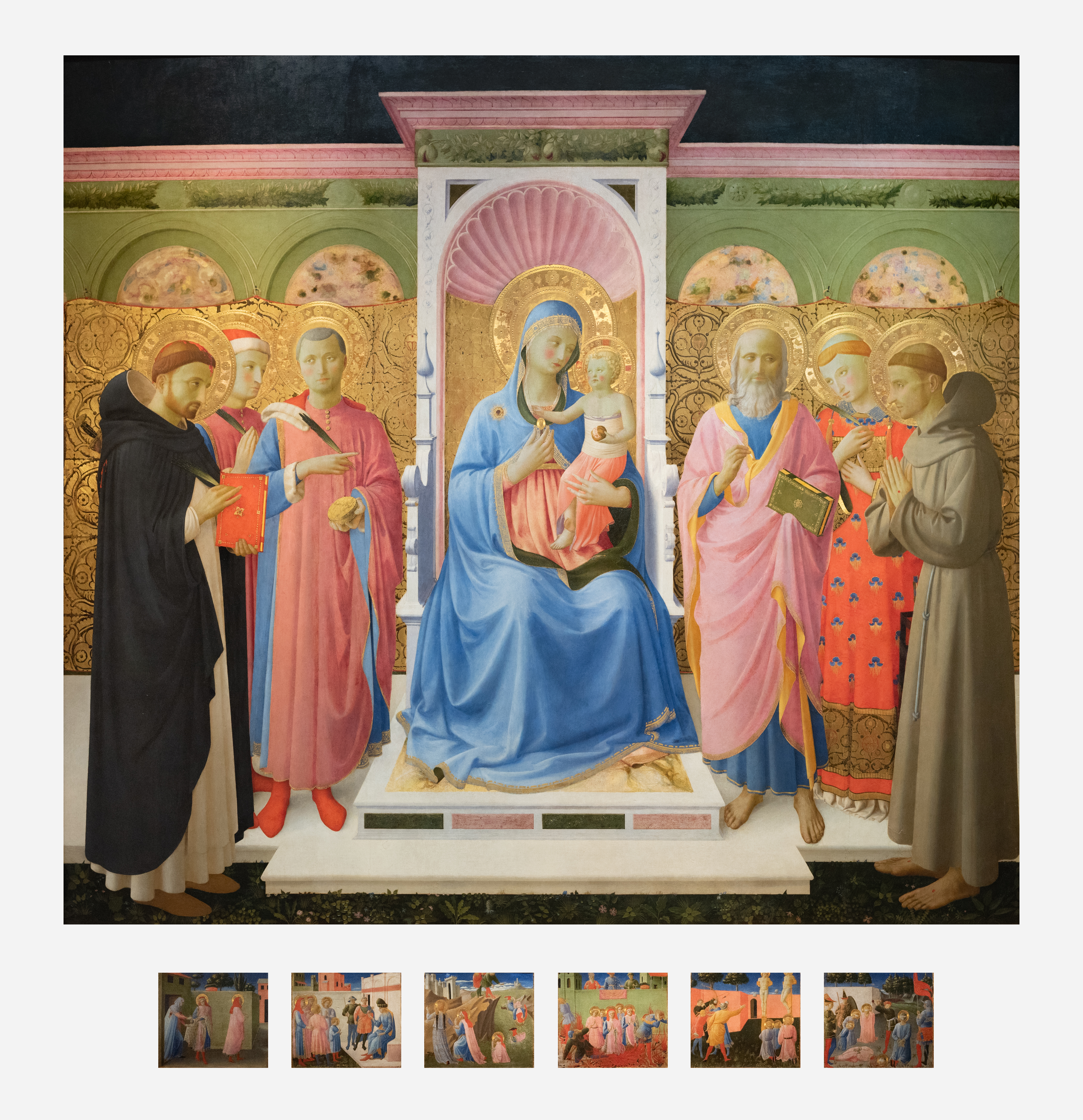
Annalena Altarpiece with predella by Fra Angelico, c. 1438–40 (frame removed), sometimes considered the "first" instance of the sacra conversazione format

In art, a sacra conversazione (Italian: [ˈsaːkra koɱversatˈtsjoːne]; plural: sacre conversazioni), meaning "holy (or sacred) conversation", is a genre developed in Italian Renaissance painting, with a depiction of the Virgin and Child (the Virgin Mary with the infant Jesus) amidst a group of saints in a relatively informal grouping, as opposed to the more rigid and hierarchical compositions of earlier periods. Donor portraits may also be included, generally kneeling, often their patron saint is presenting them to the Virgin, and angels are frequently in attendance.

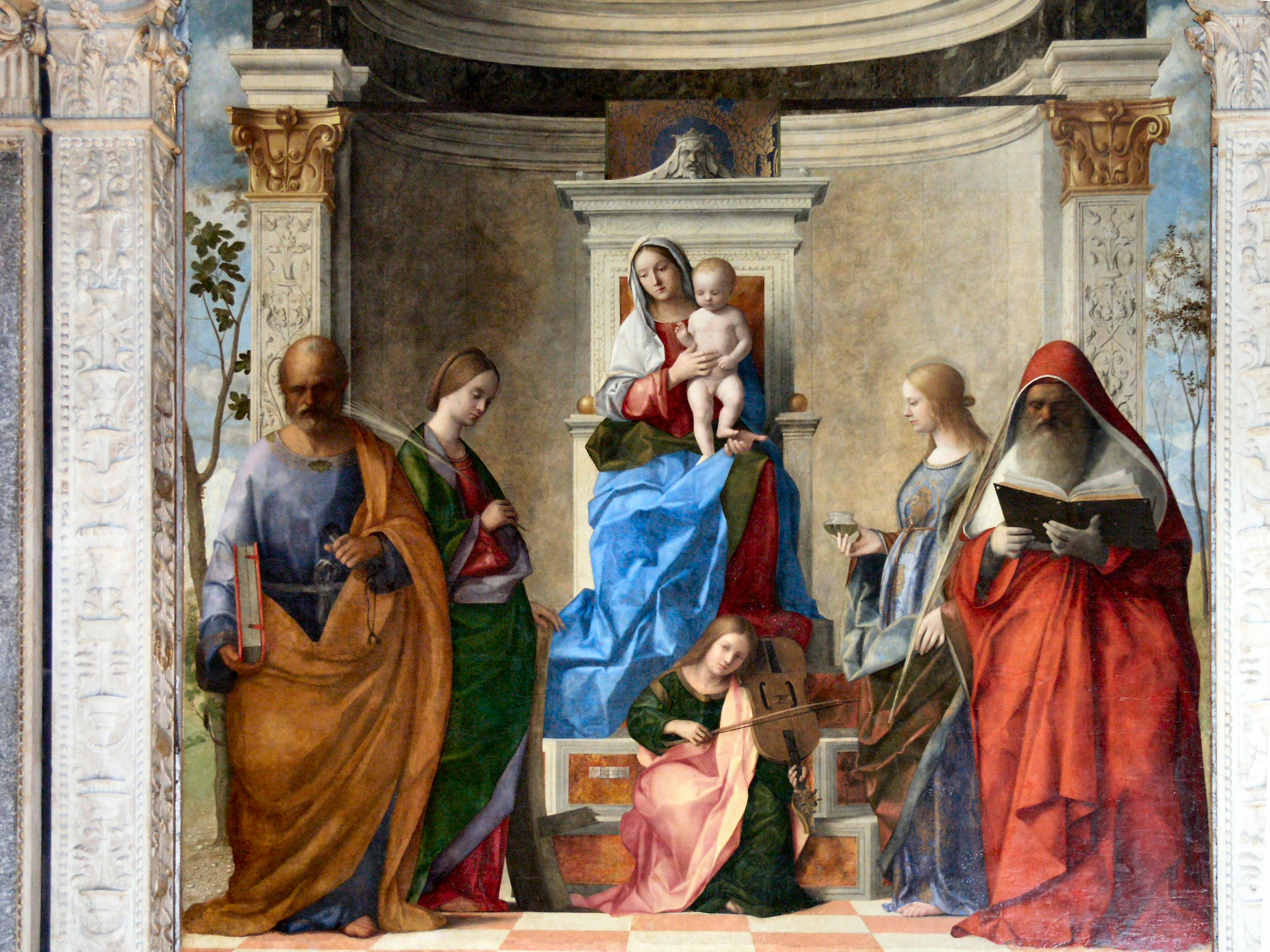
Example for a church by Giovanni Bellini, 1505, who also developed types for wealthy homes.

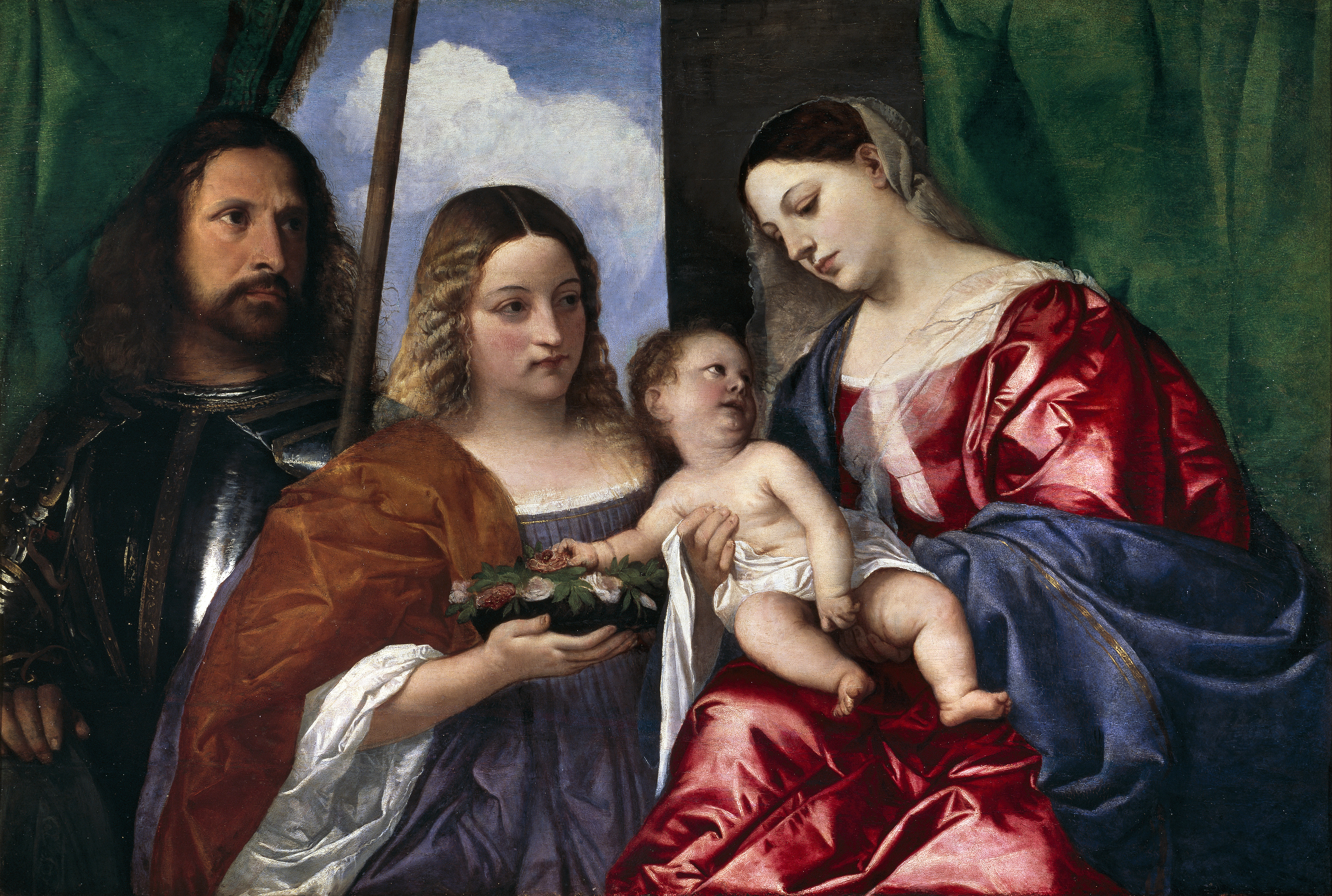
Titian, Madonna and Child with Saints Dorothy and George, 1515–18

The term is often used as a title for paintings to avoid listing all the individual figures, although the trend in museums and academic art history is now to give the full list. The name, which only appears as a title retrospectively in the 18th century, has been explained with reference to "their rapt stillness of mood, in which the Saints, scarcely looking at one another, seem to communicate at a spiritual rather than a material level". At least that is the case in earlier examples; later ones, from the 16th century onwards, often give the impression of more conventional conversations between the figures, who lean towards one another and interact more.

In Italian the term is perhaps used more often and more widely than is usually the case in English, for example covering in aria compositions in the tradition of Raphael's Sistine Madonna where the Virgin and Child hover in the air well above the saints.

== Development ==
The sacra conversazione developed as artists replaced earlier hieratic and compartmented triptych or polyptych formats for altarpieces with compositions in which figures interacted within a unified perspectival space. While traditional altarpieces generally retained a vertical format, the sacra conversazione had all the principal figures on a single level, or nearly so. They therefore tended to move towards a horizontal format, as there was little but angels and architecture to put at the top of a vertical one, unless the divine figures were raised on a very high throne, as in the unusual composition of the Castelfranco Madonna by Giorgione (c. 1503). Here as in many works, the Virgin and Child are seated on a throne, but the saints stand, so in more typical examples with the throne only slightly raised on a dais, the adult heads are at about the same level. The sacra conversazione was one of the types of image that led to the horizontal format becoming common in panel paintings; before the Renaissance it was rare in altar pieces (while the format was certainly common in murals). Often such works, especially if in a horizontal format and at half-length or with seated figures, were painted for the homes of wealthy faithful (and often collectors), whether for a private chapel or to be hung in other rooms, treated not unlike portraits or secular scenes.

Early examples are the Annalena Altarpiece (c. 1438–40), San Marco Altarpiece (c. 1438–43) and Fiesole Altarpiece by Fra Angelico and the Barbadori Altarpiece by Filippo Lippi (1437, Louvre). Having the Virgin the same size as the other figures is often regarded as essential to the type, so disqualifying most earlier works, where the Virgin is shown much larger. Among other artists to depict such a scene are Piero della Francesca, Giovanni Bellini, Paolo Veronese, and Andrea Mantegna. Some scholars have suggested that the Maestà painted by Duccio in 1308–11 for Siena Cathedral can be regarded as the "prima conversazione sacra italiana".

The early examples such as the Bellini illustrated rarely show actual "conversation" or much interaction, though this may be seen from the 16th century on, as in the Madonna and Child with Saints Luke and Catherine of Alexandria by Titian. In the first examples the setting is normally architectural, loosely representing heaven, but also, until Titian's Pesaro Altarpiece (begun 1519), continuing the architecture of the architectural frame and therefore that of the original church setting for which it was painted. This was a radical rethink of the type, apparently set outside some temple portico with large soaring columns, viewed obliquely. The Virgin and Child are no longer at the centre of the composition, but to the right of the picture space.

As in earlier altarpieces, the choice of saints is largely dictated by the patron saints of the donor and their family, and those of the church, city, diocese or religious order concerned. The mixture of figures from different periods that is normal in the type makes it clear that no historical incident is being depicted, and whatever the setting, the space should be understood as mystical rather than any actual place.

=== Landscape settings ===
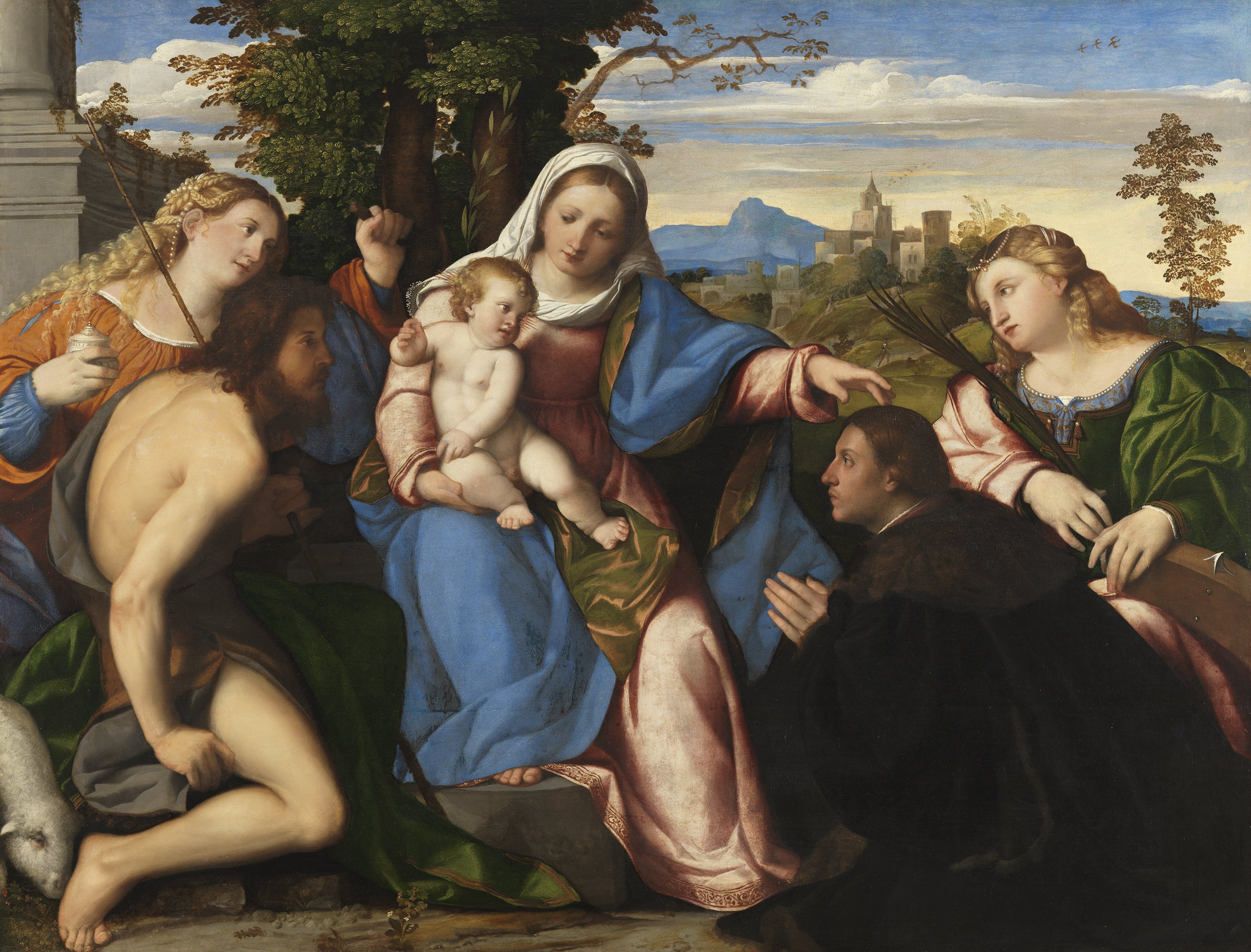
Landscape setting with a donor portrait, Palma Vecchio, c. 1519

Also in the 1510s, Titian and other Venetians had been developing the mostly northern tradition of outside settings in a garden or, especially later, an open landscape. The height of Giorgione's Castelfranco Madonna of about 1503 had allowed a landscape to show above the lower zone with the saints. Palma Vecchio became a specialist in strongly horizontal sacre conversazioni, with the figures mostly seated or kneeling in a rather tight group, combining informality and a monumental classicism. Such compositions also drew on traditional outdoor groups featuring the Holy Family such as the Rest on the Flight into Egypt, the Adoration of the Shepherds and Madonna and Child compositions with angels and other figures.

The Virgin placed in an enclosed garden is known as hortus conclusus, and when she is surrounded by female saints it is known as a Virgo inter Virgines. It was a northern speciality, when several of the figures beside the Virgin were sitting, on a bench or bank or on the ground, usually in a garden setting within an enclosure of some sort – originally a metaphor for the Virgin's womb, as the hortus conclusus began as a representation of the Annunciation, marking Mary's conception of Christ.

These more relaxed groups were continued in Venetian paintings set in open landscape. By the end of the 16th century, "the dominant relationships in an altarpiece such as Annibale Carracci’s Virgin and Child with Saints Catherine and John the Evangelist (1593, Pinacoteca Nazionale di Bologna) were not between the figures within the picture but between them and the spectator." By "Baroque painting the Virgin is removed from the earth whenever the context allows", and the scenes are often set among the heavenly clouds.

Examples in sculpture are relatively rare, if only because of the number of figures involved. One exception was planned by Michelangelo for the Medici Chapel in Florence, though he left the project before the two Medici patron saints flanking his Virgin and Child were done; these were made by others following his designs.

== In aria compositions ==
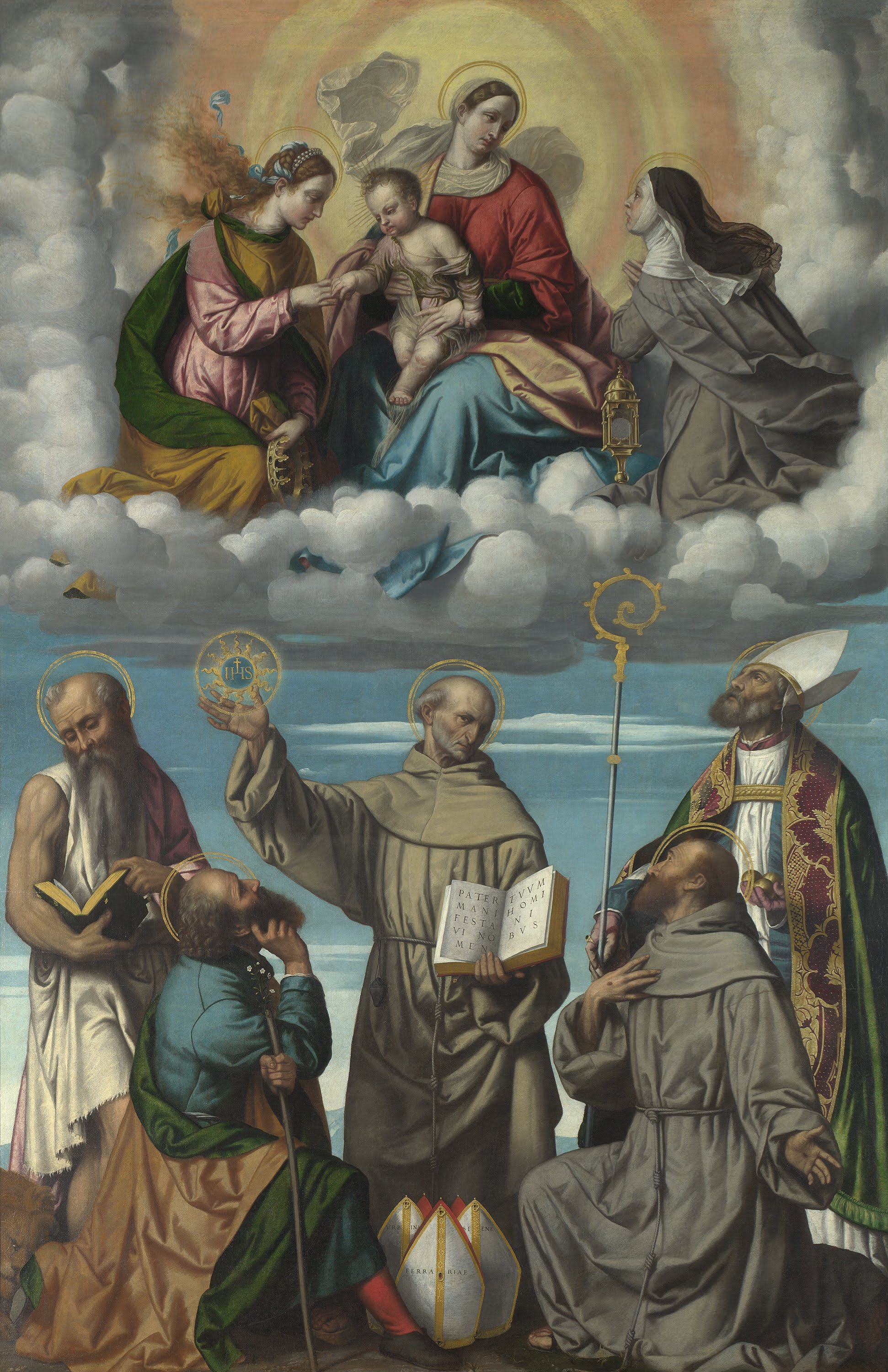
Moretto da Brescia, Virgin and Child with Saint Bernardino and Other Saints, a typical in aria composition, c. 1540–1545.

Another type of composition developed to suit the needs of vertical format altarpieces with a sacra conversatione. Here the Virgin and Child are placed, usually upon clouds, in mid-air (in aria) above the saints on the ground. There is typically a landscape background. As well as filling a vertical picture space, this had other advantages, allowing references to the Coronation of the Virgin or the Assumption of Mary. The latter doctrine was still a matter of controversy in the Reformation, and a sacra conversatione hinting at it may have been preferred by some patrons to a full depiction, which rather required the choice of saints to be restricted to the Apostles, and often had an empty tomb in the centre. Mary is sometimes being crowned by angels, while a full Coronation of the Virgin would be by at least one of the Holy Trinity. The in aria compositional type begins before 1500, and becomes increasingly popular during the century following, becoming by its end "the most common type of altarpiece in Italy".

Raphael's Madonna of Foligno of 1511 and his Sistine Madonna of 1512 are leading examples; in the latter the two saints are also kneeling on clouds, although the curtains to the sides and the ledge on which the famous angel-putti lean keep the setting tied to the earth. From the 1520s onwards Moretto da Brescia was "probably the first major Italian artist to employ it repeatedly", painting over twenty.

== Etymology ==
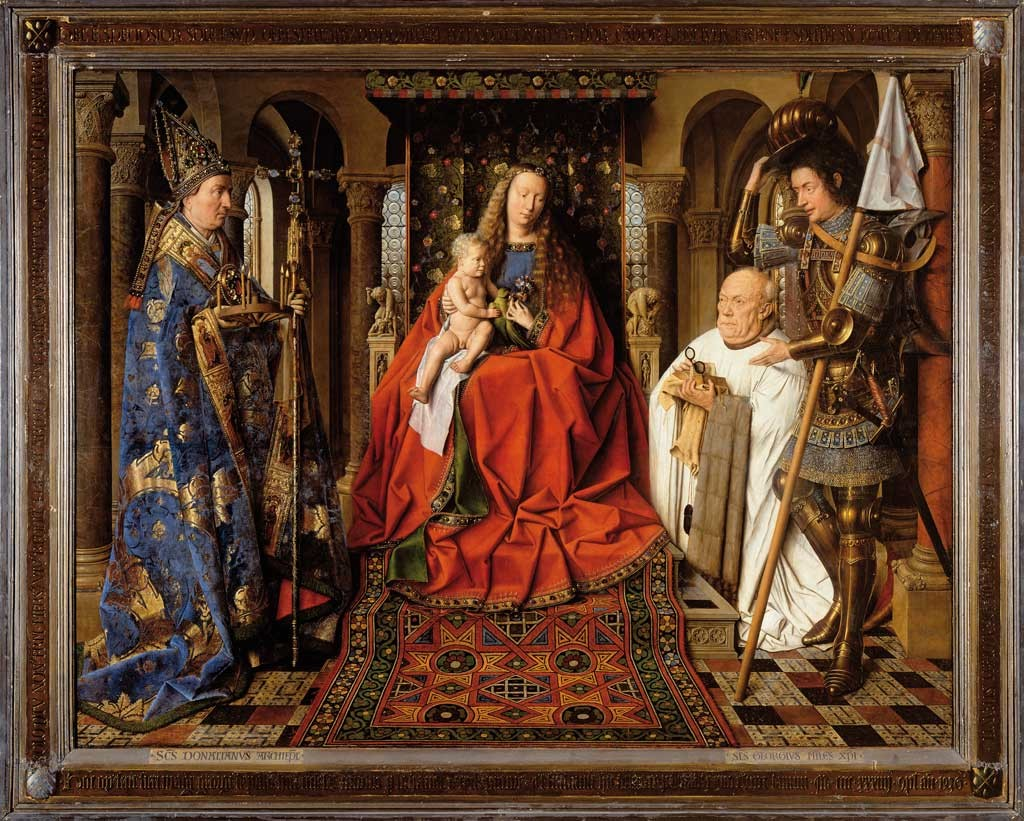
The Virgin and Child with Canon van der Paele, 1434–36

The term does not appear, referring to the subject of a picture, before Italian references at the end of the 18th century; in 1979 the earliest use found was in inventories of the Pucci family from 1763 and 1797. But the term, in its Latin equivalents santa conversatio and pia conversatio, appears several times in the key texts of the church, from the Vulgate Bible, to the Church Fathers and Catholic liturgy. But in these its meaning is more like "pious conduct" or "holy community". The development of meaning of the Italian conversazione is also rather complex; as in English, it was a long time before the word came to mean merely people talking together (the 7th meaning listed in the OED). The earliest English meaning, from 1340, is defined by the OED as "The action of living or having one's being in a place or among persons", very close to the Latin.

As the description of a painting, the term remained little used until the mid-19th century, when it was apparently popularized, at least in English, by the History of Painting in Italy (3 volumes, 1864–1866) by Crowe and Cavalcaselle. They claimed "with remarkable élan" that Palma Vecchio was "the inventor of the large Sacra Conversazione in which full-lengths of saints hold court in the presence of the Virgin ....", suggesting a rather more narrow sense of the term than prevails today.

Later art historians have commonly placed the origin of the type in works by Masaccio, Domenico Veneziano or Fra Angelico, though Jacob Burckhardt was among those complaining about its use. Nigel Gauk-Roger says that the "first true sacra conversazione was almost certainly" the Santa Lucia de' Magnoli Altarpiece by Domenico Veneziano from around 1445–47 (main panel now Uffizi). All of these have standing saints in an architectural setting. Rona Goffen traces the origin of the type further back, to the Trecento, examining several examples, many from the Basilica of Saint Francis of Assisi, and at half-length.

Most accounts of the development restrict themselves to Italy, ignoring northern parallels, despite the Virgin and Child with Canon van der Paele (and two saints) by Jan van Eyck clearly representing the same type, from as early as 1434–36, as Otto Pächt has pointed out.

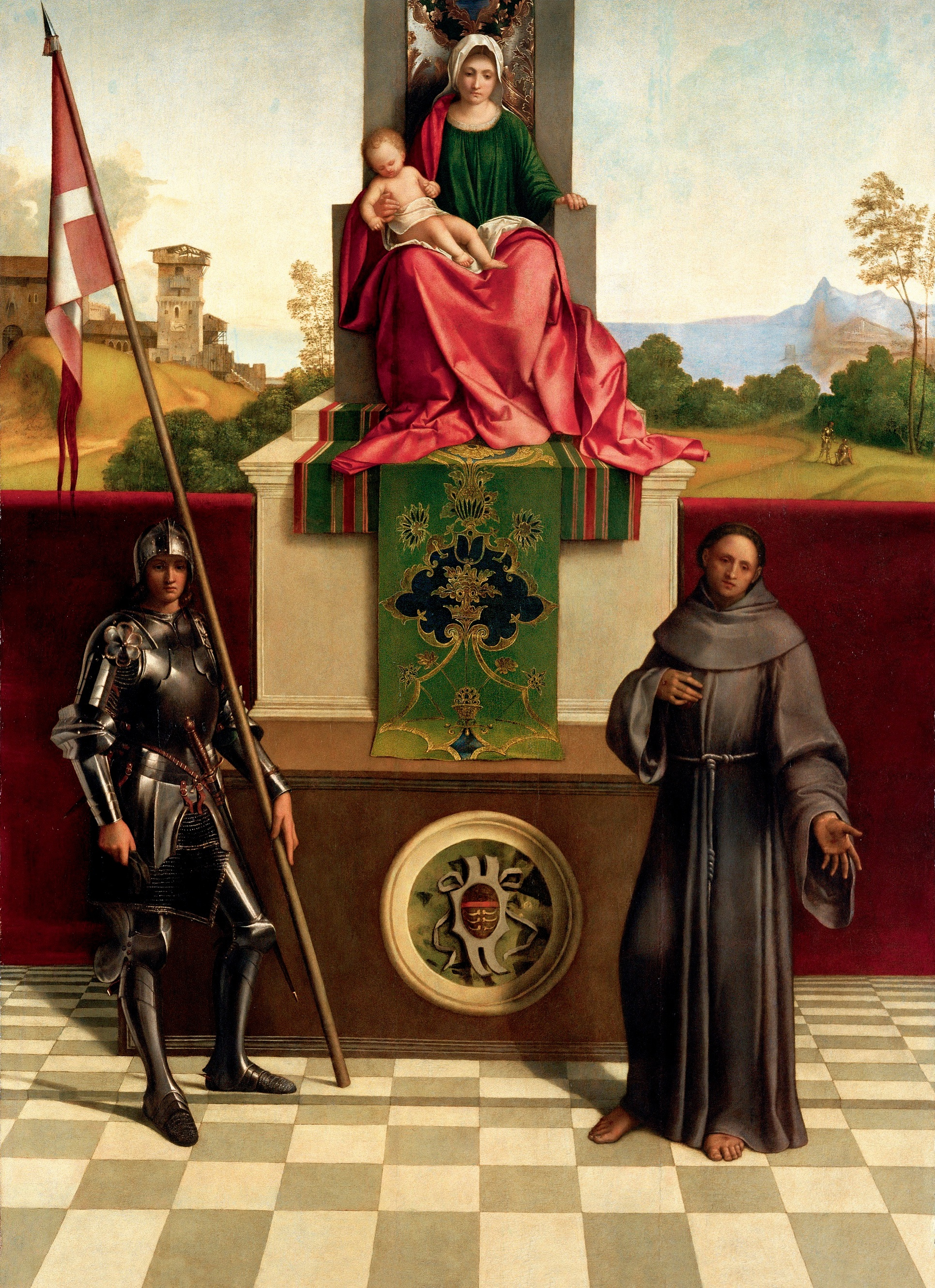
Castelfranco Madonna, Giorgione, c. 1503

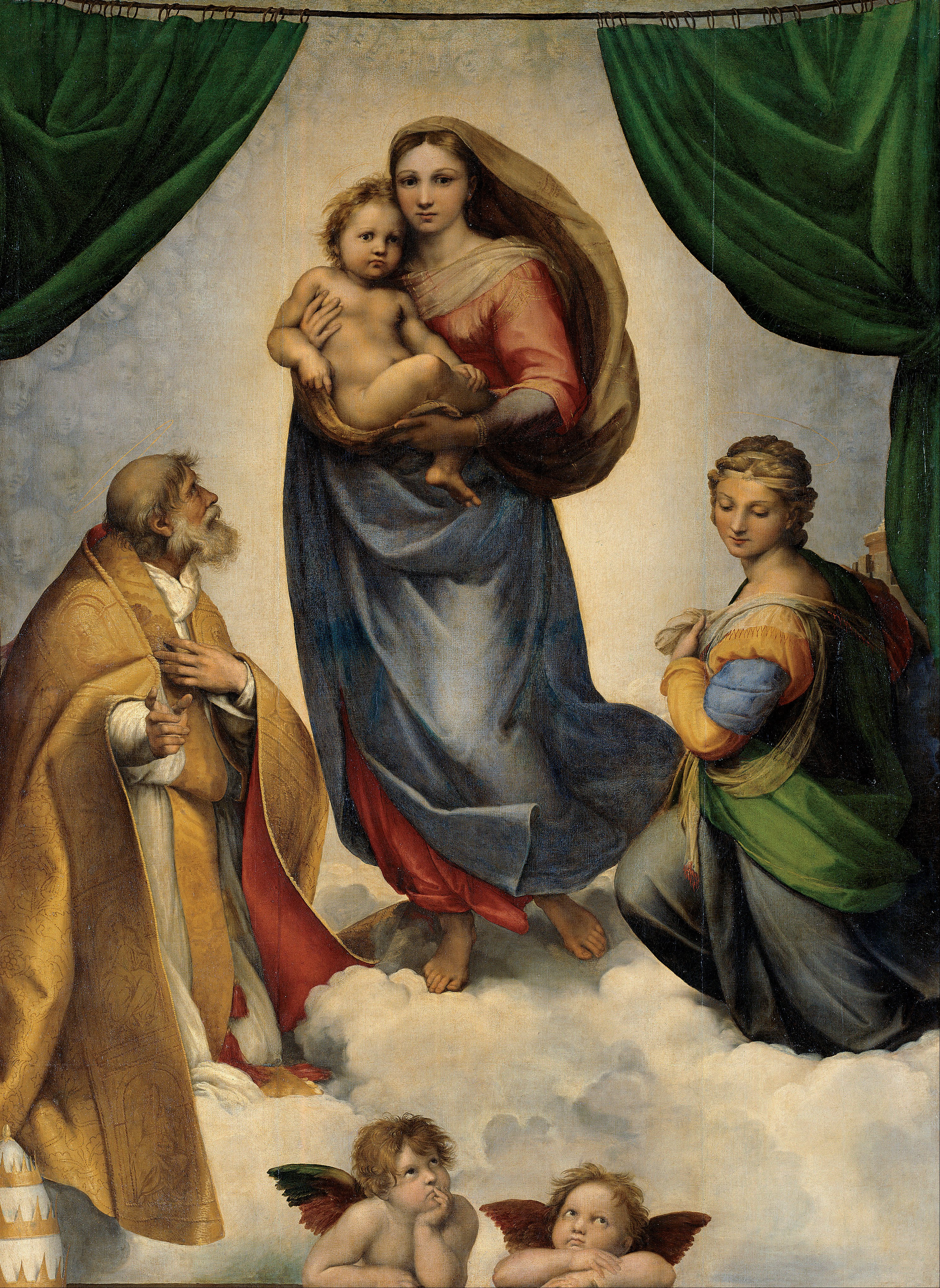
Sistine Madonna, Raphael, 1512–13

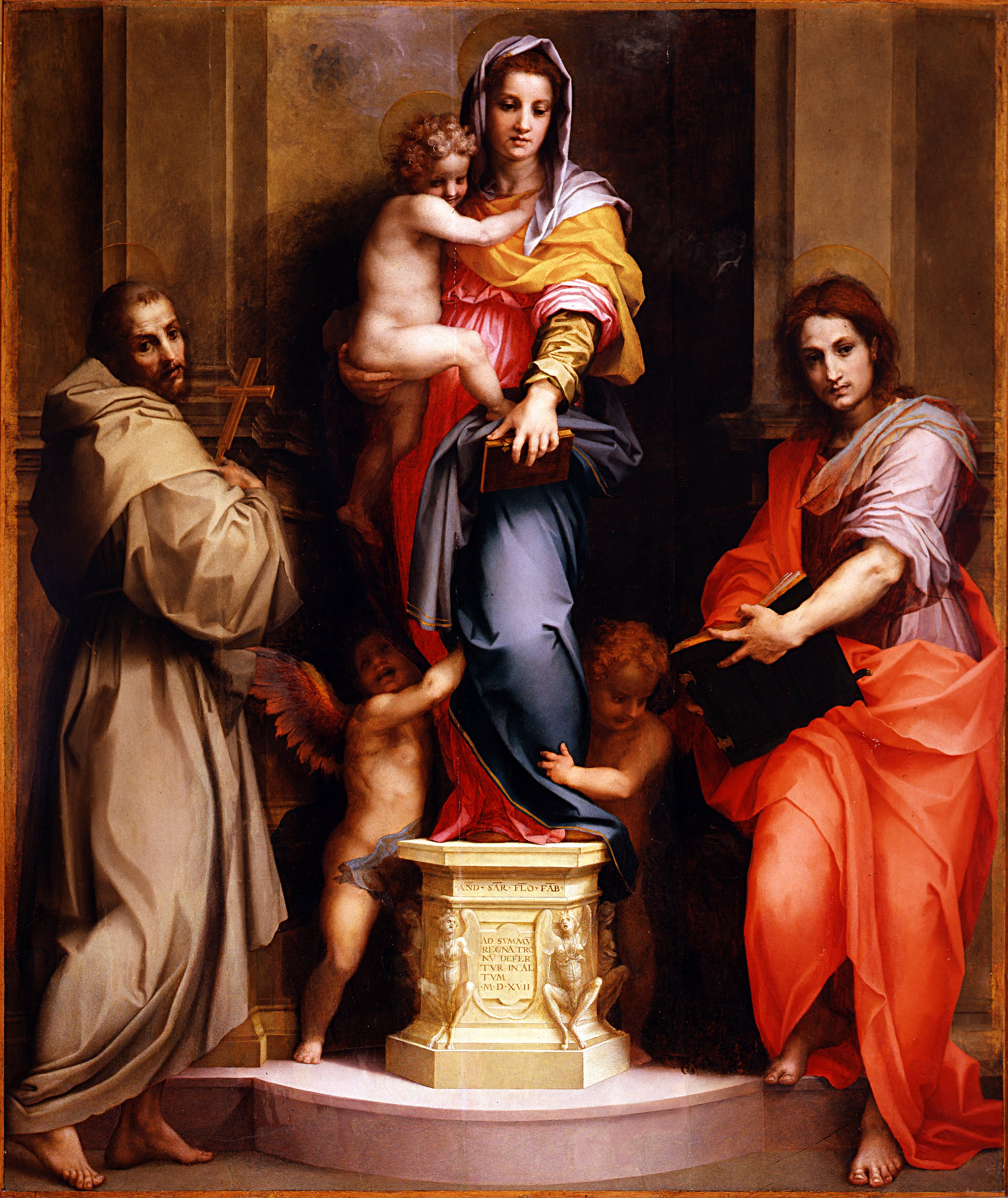
Andrea del Sarto, Madonna of the Harpies, 1517

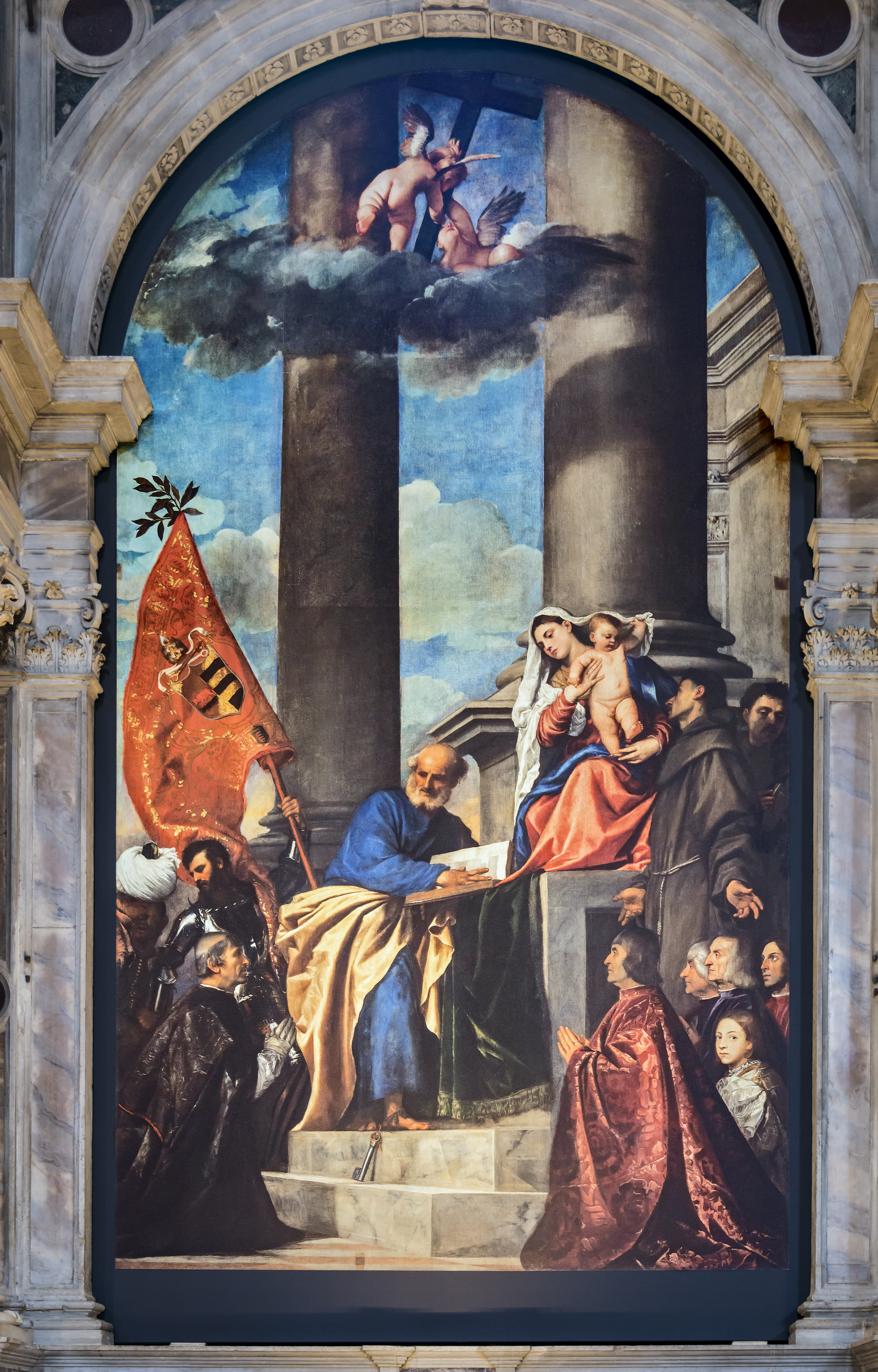
Titian's Pesaro Altarpiece, begun 1519

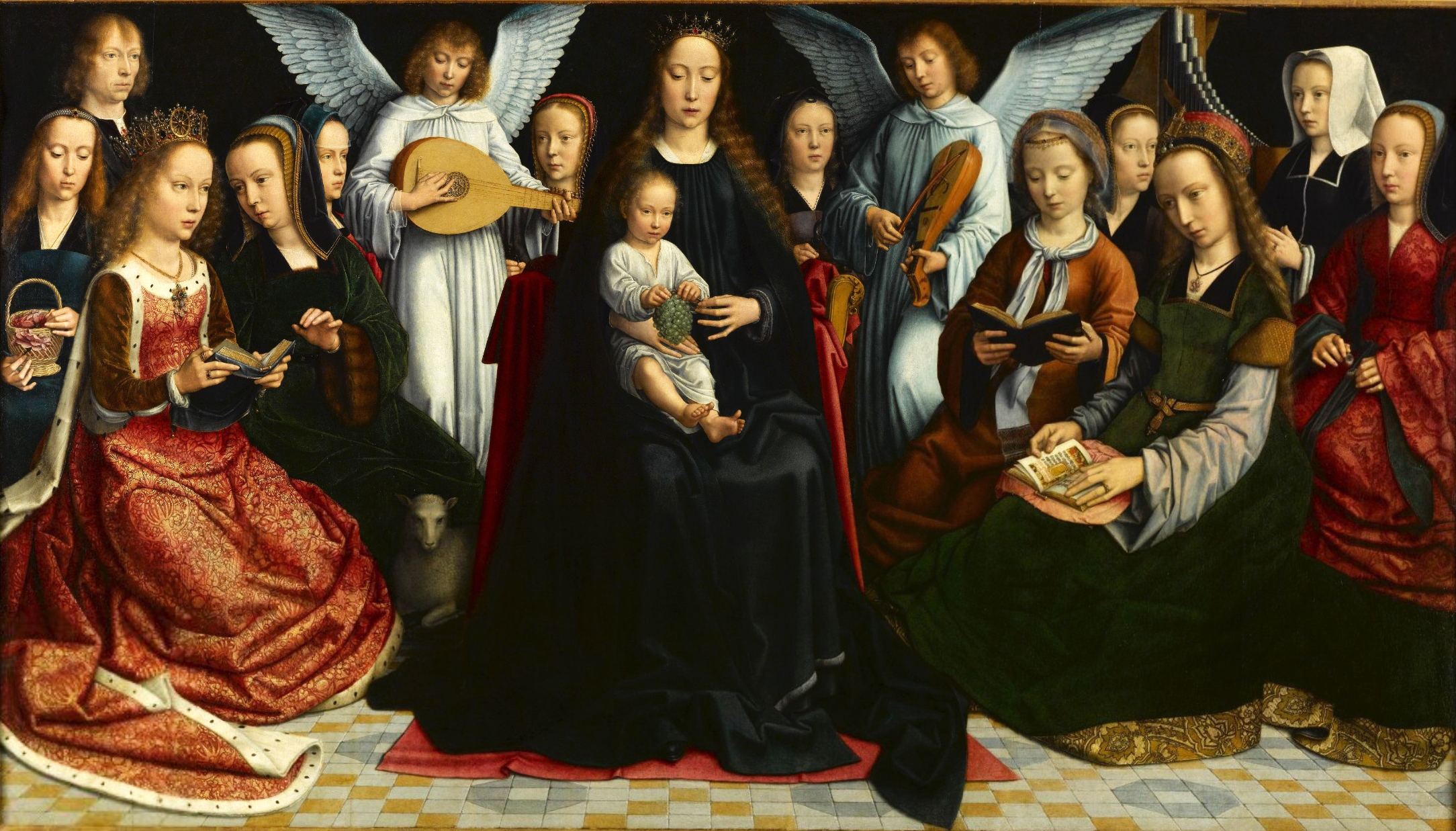
Virgo inter Virgines, Gerard David, c. 1509, with two donor portraits, in this case the artist and his wife.

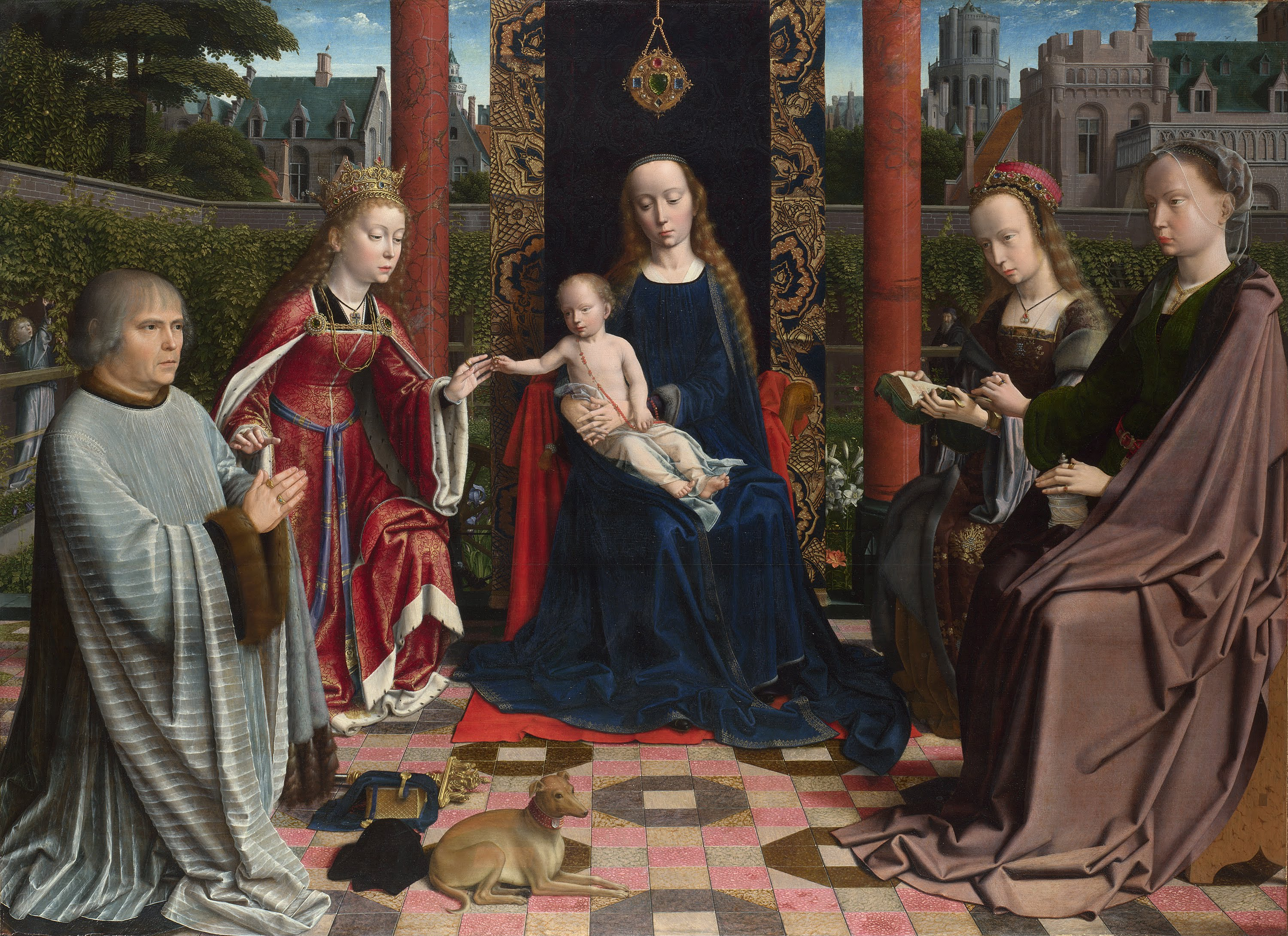
Gerard David, The Virgin and Child with Saints and Donor, c. 1510, the hortus conclusus type.

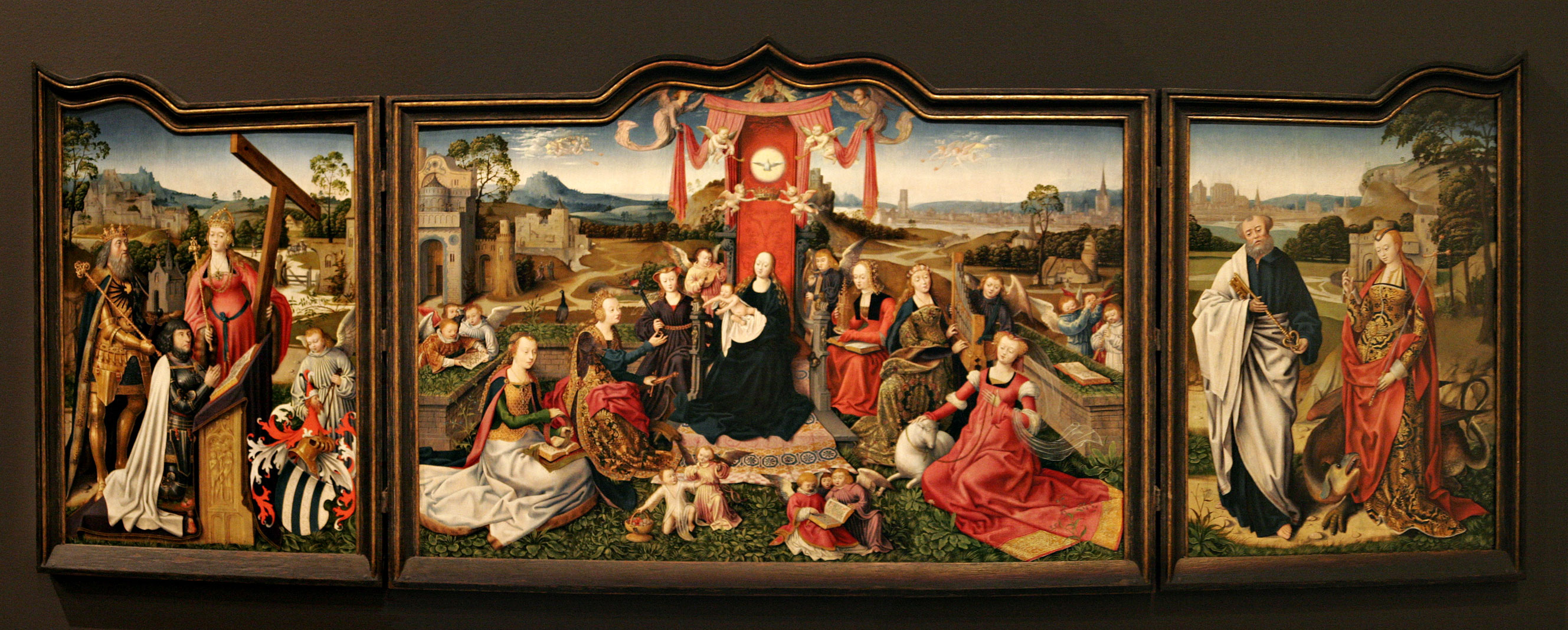
Hortus conclusus in Triptych of the Virgin and Child with Saints depicted by a member of the Cologne school, c. 1520

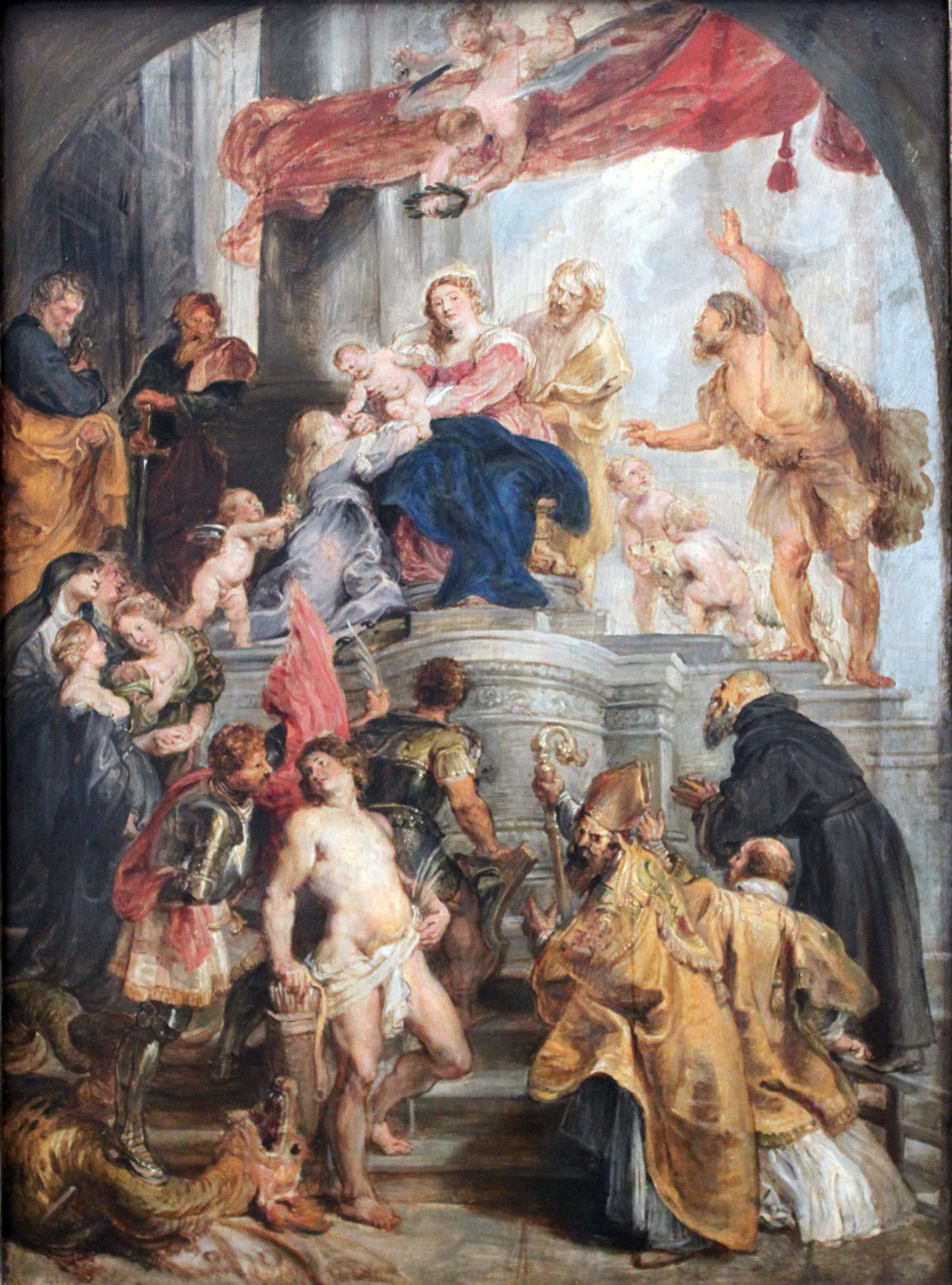
Rubens, 1627

== See also ==
- Conversation piece
- Conversazione – a Victorian gathering focused on the arts or sciences
