= The Vision of Saint Bernard (Fra Bartolomeo) =

Painting by Fra Bartolomeo

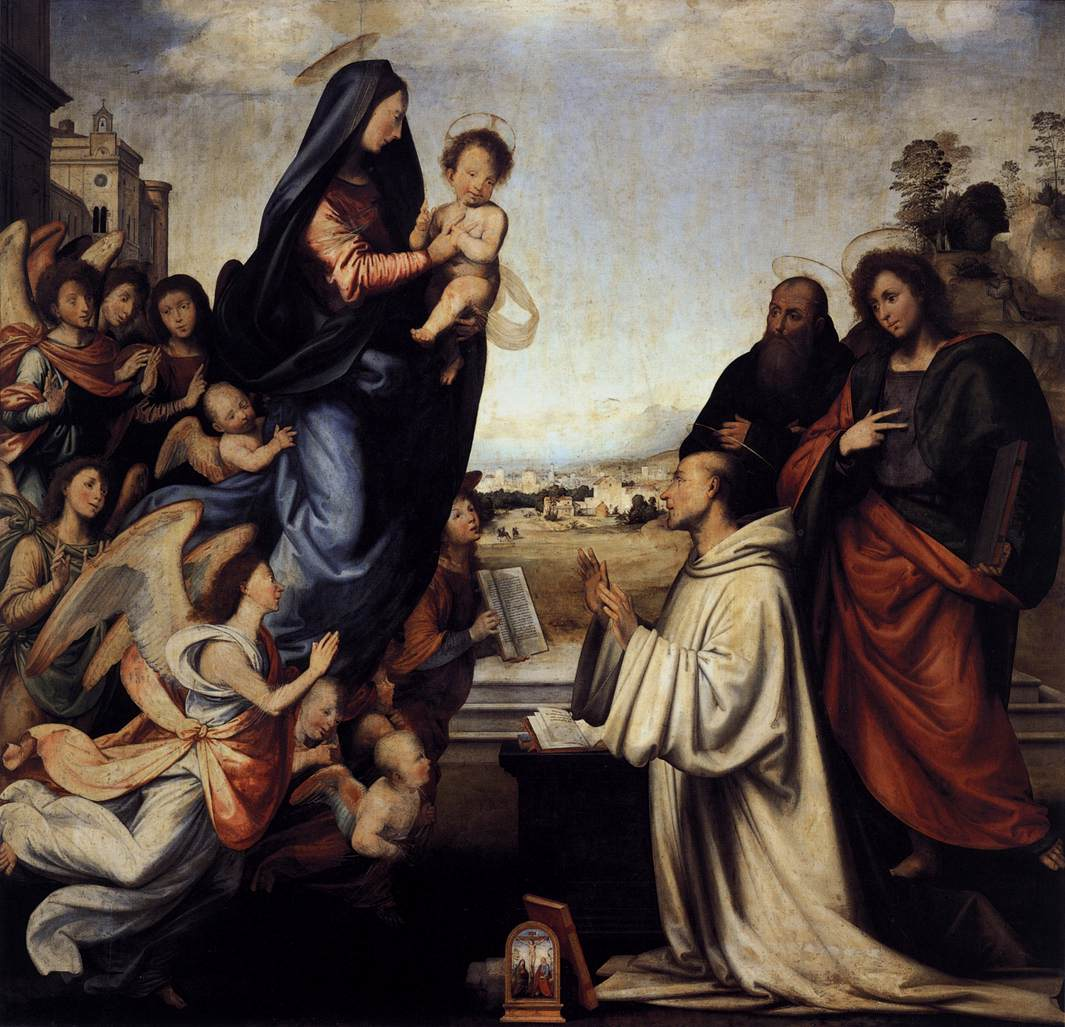
- Artist: Fra Bartolomeo
- Year: 1504–1507
- Medium: Oil on wood panel
- Dimensions: 215 cm × 231 cm (85 in × 91 in)
- Location: Uffizi, Florence

The Vision of Saint Bernard (or the Apparition of the Virgin to Saint Bernard) is an oil painting on panel by the Italian artist Fra Bartolomeo, datable to 1504–1507. It is held in the Uffizi, in Florence.

== History ==
In 1504, four years after Fra Bartolomeo had taken his vows, the prior of the Convent of San Marco, where he lived, suggested him to return to painting, which he had not done since taking the Dominican habit. The artist accepted his suggestion and for that purpose he set up a small workshop in the same convent. He received his first commission on 18 November 1504, from Bernardo del Bianco, for an altarpiece destined for the Badia Fiorentina. Fra Bartolomeo worked on the painting in the following years, until the work was completed and delivered in 1507, when the client paid the balance of the payment. The painting was installed in the family chapel in the church, specially created by Benedetto da Rovezzano.

In 1627, with the demolition of the original chapel, the altarpiece was moved to the sacristy. It remained in the church until the Napoleonic suppressions when it went, like all the major works of Florentine churches and convents, to the recently established Galleria dell'Accademia, in 1810. In 1945, with the reorganization of the Florentine state collections, it was finally assigned to the Uffizi.

Today in the Badia there is another masterwork with the same subject, The Vision of Saint Bernard by Filippino Lippi.

== Description and style ==
The first work created by Fra Bartolomeo after his profound mystical crisis following the death of Girolamo Savonarola, it shows a strong mystical sense. Iconographically the artist refers to the analogous work of Perugino, from which derives the pose of the saint, his white habit and contemplative attitude. More complex, however, is the left half of the painting, where appear the Virgin and Child, while a group of angels seems to be pushing the Virgin forward. On the right side, instead, the presence of two saints, Benedict and Barnabas, balances the group of Saint Bernard.

In the background there is a bright landscape with a city, while on the right, on a cliff, is visible the scene of Saint Francis of Assisi receiving the stigmata, to underline the communion between the different forms of monastic religiosity—the Benedictines, the Dominicans and the Franciscans. A small tablet at the bottom in the center of the composition with the Crucifixion is leaning against a book, a devotional motif taken from the example of Fra Angelico in the San Marco Altarpiece.

The complexion is full-bodied and florid, while the composition seems to anticipate the developments of Mannerism. In fact, the movements of the figures seem to have slowed down, making the gestures and the looks more grandiloquent. The pointed physiognomies of the angels' heads instead demonstrate a quotation from the capricious ways of Piero di Cosimo.

The miraculous tale appears normalized in everyday life, emphasized only by the grandeur of the Michelangelo-inspired forms.
