= Saint Bernard and the Virgin (Cano) =

Painting by Alonso Cano

- San Bernardo y la Virgen (Spanish)
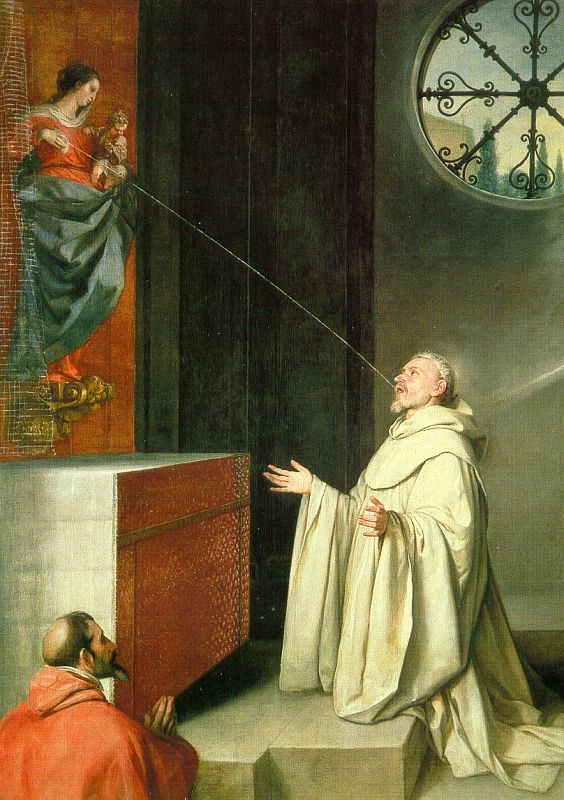
- Artist: Alonso Cano
- Year: 1645-1652
- Catalogue: P003134
- Medium: Oil on canvas
- Movement: Baroque
- Subject: Lactatio Bernardi
- Dimensions: 267 cm × 185 cm (105 in × 73 in)
- Location: Museo del Prado, Madrid

Saint Bernard and the Virgin is an oil on canvas painting by Spanish artist Alonso Cano, dated between 1645 and 1652, now held in the Museo del Prado in Madrid.

Cano probably painted Saint Bernard and the Virgin during one of his stays at the Spanish royal court, after which it was used as an altarpiece by the Capuchins at Toledo. The scene depicts the traditional Lactatio Bernardi miracle, in which Bernard of Clairvaux was given a stream of milk by the Virgin Mary as a reward for his theological work. A cardinal can be seen praying in the bottom-left corner. Unlike other versions of the scene, Bernard does not receive the milk from a personal Marian apparition but from a statue.

The work was owned by Infante Sebastián Gabriel de Borbón until 1835. It passed to the Trinidad Museum between 1835 and 1861, after what it returned to its previous owner. It belonged to Alfonso de Borbón y Borbón from 1887 to his death year 1934, and was then held by the 2nd Duke of Ansola until 1942. The 1st Duke of Hernani possessed it until 1964; and it was finally bought from Manuel González by the Prado Museum in 1968.

== See also ==
- The Apparition of the Virgin to Saint Bernard (Murillo)
