= San Marco Altarpiece =

1438–1443 painting by Fra Angelico

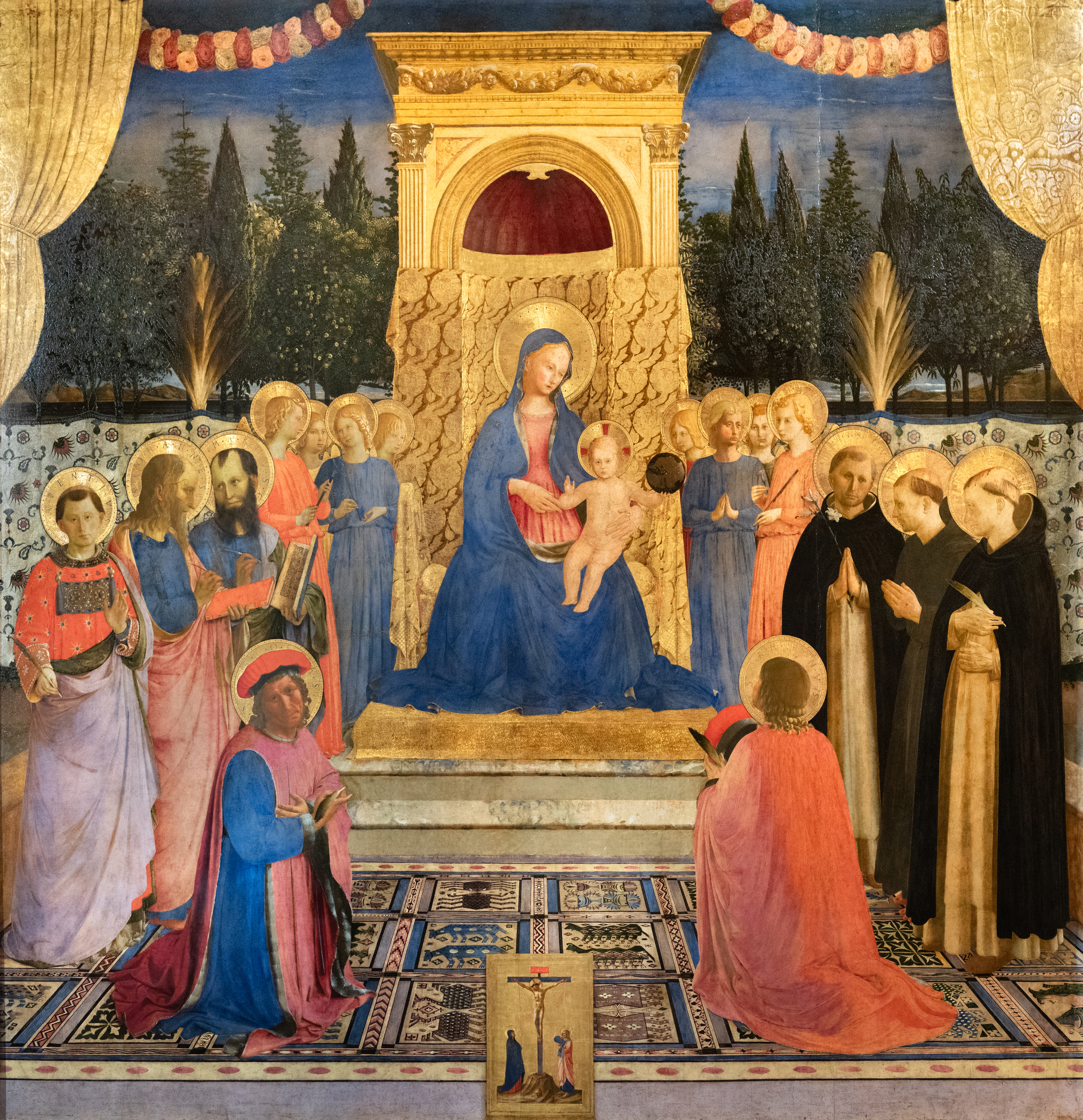
- Artist: Fra Angelico
- Year: 1438–1443
- Medium: Tempera on wood
- Dimensions: 220 cm × 227 cm (87 in × 89 in)
- Location: San Marco Museum, Florence, Italy

The San Marco Altarpiece (also known as Madonna and Saints) is a panel painting, originally a polyptych, by the Italian early Renaissance painter Fra Angelico. The main panel is now in the San Marco Museum of Florence, Italy. The altarpiece was commissioned by Cosimo de' Medici the Elder, and completed sometime between 1438 and 1443.

In addition to the main panel depicting the enthroned Virgin and Child surrounded by angels and saints, there were nine predella panels accompanying it, narrating the legend of the patron saints, Saints Cosmas and Damian. Only the main panel remains in the monastery, now a museum, of San Marco, Florence, along with two side panels depicting saints which were purchased back for the museum in 2007. Other panels are now dispersed to several collections.

The San Marco Altarpiece is known as one of the best early Renaissance paintings for its employment of metaphor and perspective, trompe-l'œil, and the intertwining of Dominican religious themes and symbols with contemporary, political messages.

== Background ==
When the Dominican Order claimed ownership of the church and monastery of San Marco, they realized the buildings had been badly neglected and needed sponsorship to renovate the building. Cosimo de' Medici and his brother Lorenzo di Giovanni de' Medici took it upon themselves to hire architect Michelozzo to rebuild the monastery. As customary, they rededicated the church to include the patron saints, Saints Cosmas and Damian, as well as the original eponym, Saint Mark. The Medici patron saints were prominently included in the dedication to insist to the friars that Cosimo and his wealth played a vital role in the convent's establishment.

After acquiring the patronage rights to the choir and high altar in 1438, the Medici brothers executed their plans to replace the existing altarpiece by Lorenzo di Niccolò with one of their own. Cosimo de' Medici commissioned the Dominican friar Giovanni da Fiesole, who Giorgio Vasari would later name Fra Angelico, to paint the new altarpiece alongside additional frescoes in the cells, corridors, and cloister of the rebuilt monastery. The Medici not only earned the rights to the San Marco monastery, but to other churches as well, extending their territorial presence the whole length of the Via Larga, at the other end of which stood the family residences. and even sponsored the Feste de' Magi, an extravagant performance of the Magi's journey from Herod's Palace in Jerusalem to the stable in Bethlehem.

The Medici's direct hand in the affairs of the Feste de' Magi, Florence as a symbol for the Holy Land, and San Marco as the final destination and the symbol of Bethlehem surely served to adulate the Medici position. For the Medici, the festival was more of a political instrument than anything else. Florentines would flock to San Marco to see the actual San Marco Altarpiece during the Festa de' Magi parade when the "Three Kings" entered the choir to pay homage to the Christ Child. The Medici's reign over San Marco and Cosimo's patronage were not just expressions of the Dominican Observance, but a foothold for political development as well.

== Description ==
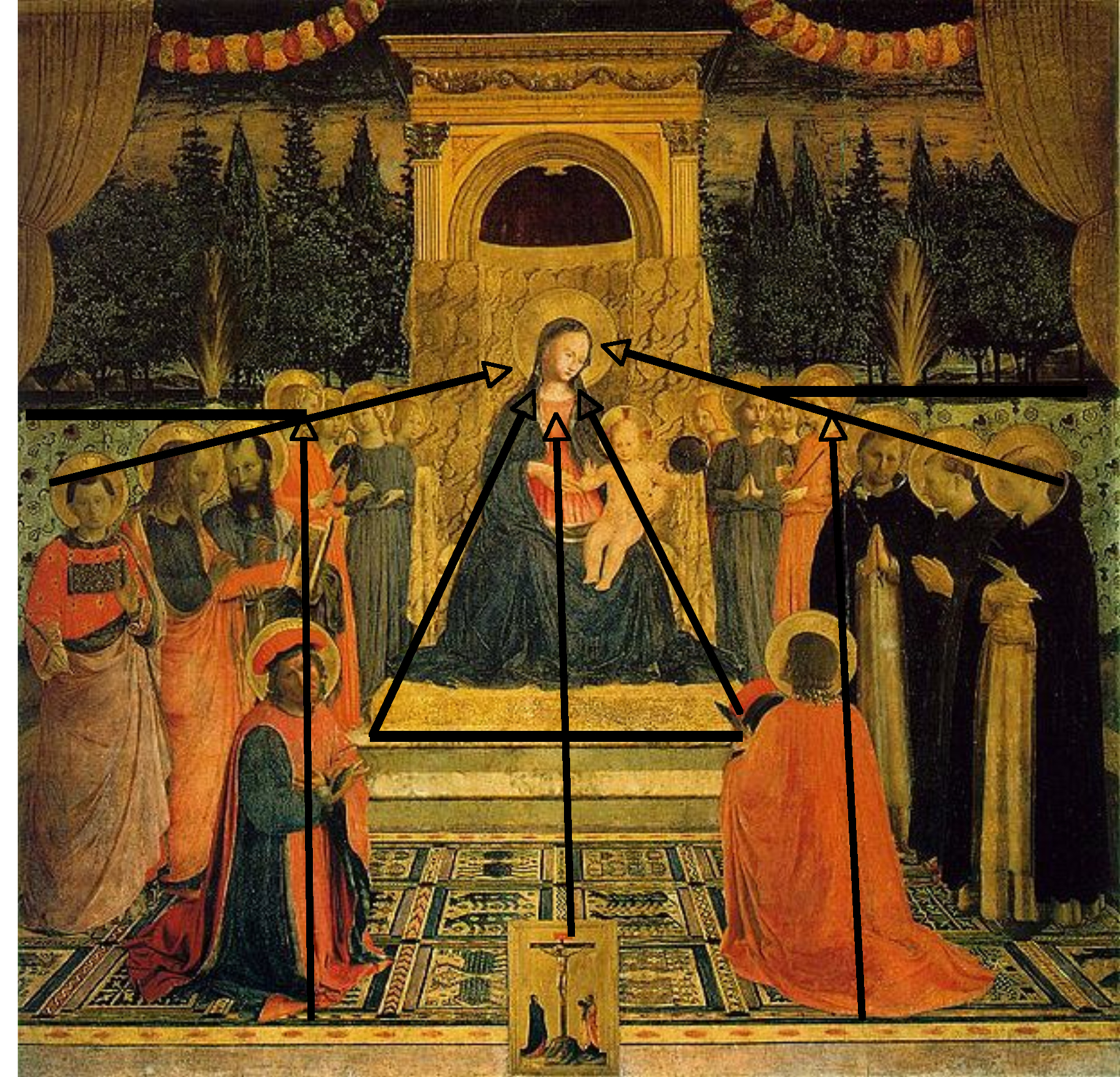
Lines of the San Marco Altarpiece

The San Marco Altarpiece depicts a portrait of the Virgin and Child seated on a throne surrounded by saints and angels. The formal elements are innovative for a contemporary Virgin and Child altarpiece as the positioning of the characters creates a deeply receding and logical space in front of the landscape background. The pomegranate embroidered curtain behind the Virgin and Child establishes a distinct horizontal line separating the events depicted in the painting from the landscape behind it. The altarpiece is situated on the then newly invented single rectangular panel, which helps turn a typical easel painting into the principal image of the altarpiece. Representing the figures set within a coherent pictorial space was also a new technique Angelico employed. While partially covered by the saints and angels, there is a definite line created by the carpet's receding squares in the foreground adding depth to the painting. Angelico's use of space is exceptional as he creates a sense of balance on both sides of the Virgin and Child, but also leaves available space on the carpet approaching the Virgin and Child so the viewer does not feel blocked or overwhelmed. This symmetry and order would allow worshippers to clearly view the painting from afar.

He also employs naturalistic effects of light and color combined with a variety of colors and patterns. The natural colors contribute to the slightly darker complexion of the painting, which may accentuate the sacred holiness of the moment. His usage of the red and blue traditional colors of the Virgin and Saints Cosmas and Damian is noteworthy. By dressing both kneeling saints as well as several of the angels in red, Angelico creates a vertical link and further geometric stability. The symmetry resulting from the figures and colors allows the viewer to zoom-in and creates a smooth, continuous movement from figure to figure, eventually arriving at the Virgin and Child in the center. On the right, Saint Damian kneels on an inward angle towards the center praising the Virgin and Child, which draws the viewer's eyes towards the painting's vanishing point at the Virgin's chin. The Virgin and Child are featured precisely at the vertical and horizontal axes' intersecting points and are placed above Angelico's trompe-l'œil depiction of the crucifixion.

One may criticize Angelico for his imperfect use of scale. Though they are sitting on a pedestal, the Virgin and Child do not seem much larger than the rest of the characters, showing a lack of a scale setting the main subjects apart from other mortals. If anything, the Virgin and Child should be smaller due to their increased distance from the viewer. While he does create a sense of depth, the distance to approach the throne is minimal, which some historians perceive as a lack of awe for the holy figures. The altarpiece is thus seen as a radical departure from the vulnerable models known in Dominican art. One should also note that the San Marco Altarpiece is one of the earliest examples of sacra conversazione (sacred conversation), a type of image showing the Virgin and Child amongst saints in a unified space and single pictorial field, rather than setting them completely apart.

== Saints ==
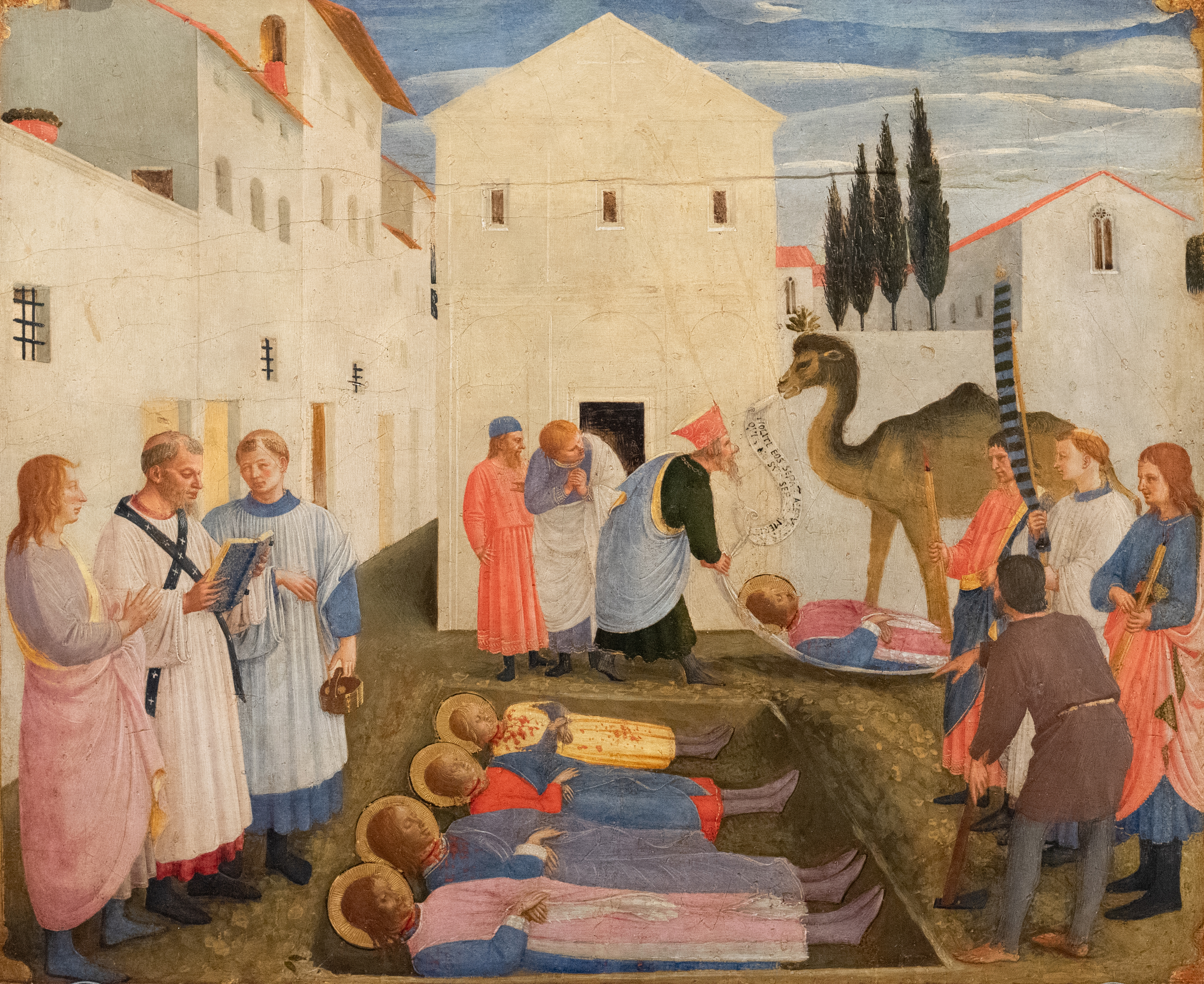
Predella panel, The Burial of Saints Cosmas and Damian, also in San Marco

The saints play an integral role in the structure and program of the altarpiece. The two patron physician saints, Saints Cosmas and Damian, are the most commented on subjects of the painting as the intercessors between the Virgin and Child. The saints are kneeling most immediately in the foreground, making them larger than the remaining figures and signifying their importance. Saint Cosmas is seen as the primary interlocutor figure as he mirror's the viewer's glance, looking directly at the viewer. This establishes a sense of accessibility to the painting on the viewer's part. Saint Cosmas's representation pays homage to Cosimo de' Medici since it has been identified as a portrait of Cosimo himself. On the right, Saint Damian takes the expected kneeling pose of a Dominican worshipper showing reverent devotion. His positioning, as written above, helps contribute to the viewer's visual path towards the center of the painting. If one looks carefully, Saints Cosmas and Damian form two bases of a triangle whose apex is the Virgin and Child.

On the far left, Saint Lawrence, representing Cosimo's brother Lawrence, too glances out towards the viewer as an invitation into the holy space of the Virgin and Child. He also represents Cosmas' deceased brother, Lorenzo. Next to Saint Lawrence is Saint John the Evangelist standing for both Cosimo's father, Giovanni di Bicci de' Medici and Cosimo's own son, Giovanni de' Medici. Saint Mark, the dedicatee of the church, is seen next to Saint John the Evangelist holding an open codex above Saint Cosmas's head, which is further discussed below (Symbols). The right side of the painting features Saint Dominic, closest to the Virgin, and Saint Peter the Martyr, closest to the viewer, as the 2nd Dominican saint depicted. The central saint on the right side is Saint Francis who stands for Cosimo's elder son Piero and most likely Lorenzo's son Pier Francesco.

== Metaphors and perspective ==
Two metaphors of perspective utilized in the San Marco altarpiece are the open window and the mirror. The open window metaphor of perspective implies continuity between real space and the space of the image and similarly, the mirror metaphor divides the real and the imaginary, suggesting a correspondence between the viewer's world and the fictive world of the painting. The fictive curtains in the upper corners of the painting for example, signal alterity (or otherness) of the scene by drawing attention to the surface. By unveiling the painted curtains, Angelico draws the viewer into the painting as if they were an audience watching a performance. At the same time however, the fact that the curtains are indeed present draws a line between observing the painting and entering the scene. The pax portraying Jesus's crucifixion is an exemplary use of trompe-l'œil and creates another layer of the open window metaphor. As in most other paintings that employ this technique, Angelico makes it seem as if the pax actually resides on the picture's plane. It is a clear stop sign that allows the viewer to approach the painting, but only to a certain point. It reinforces the verisimilitude of the three-dimensional space behind it, simultaneously creating borders and blocking access to the fictive, heavenly space of the painting. Mirroring, as exemplified by the saints, helps establish a correlation between the world of the choir and the images in the painting itself. As aforementioned, the saints in the foreground mimic the viewer's glare towards the vanishing point, thus marking the viewers' presence, but only temporarily. When Saint Cosmas stares out towards the viewer, he acknowledges the viewer's presence, but there is nonetheless a boundary between the viewer and the divine scene. In other words, both the real and fictive worlds are connected and those in the real world are invited to observe but not fully participate in the ideal Heavenly world. The mirror metaphor thus allows the viewer to feel connected to the piece and the window metaphor gives the viewer a foretaste of a pictorial vision of heaven, but Fra Angelico also uses the crucifixion pax and curtains to remind the viewer of the closed, 'glazed' nature of the illusion. In this one painting, the metaphors of perspective produce simultaneous feelings of absence, presence, and reflection.

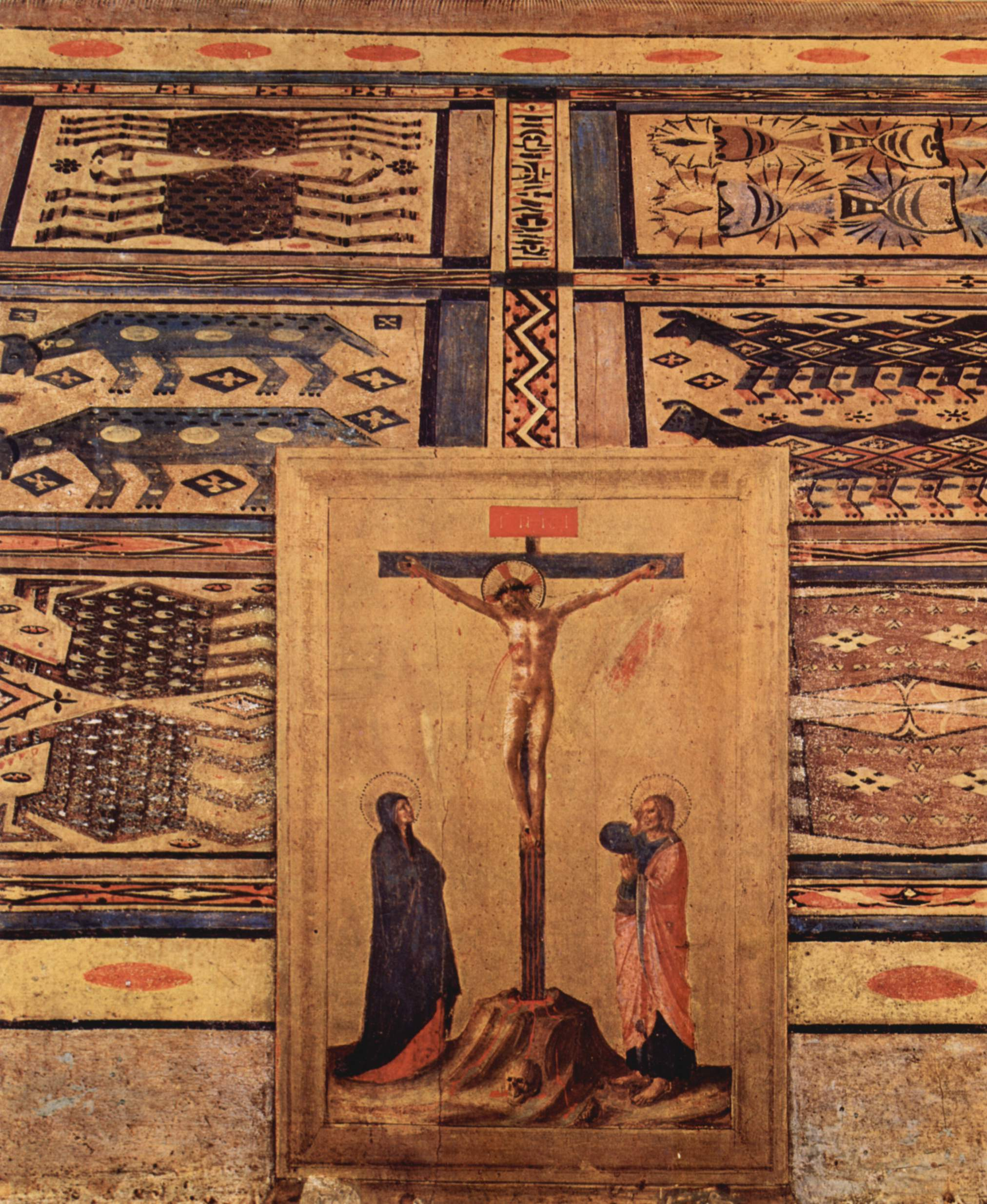
Detail of the Crucifixion pax

== Symbols ==
In the early days of the Dominican Order, only sculpted or painted crucifixes were allowed on altarpieces. The crucifix remained a fundamental component to the altar's furnishings as it represented the closest parallel to the action of Mass and the consecration of the body and blood of Christ. The San Marco Altarpiece's crucifixion pax's gold background, archaistic figure, and almost gilded frame makes it clear that it is supposed to be seen as a separate painting. The fact that it enhances the naturalism of the work behind it because of its appearance as another painting, not an actual part of the scene, makes it a perfect example of trompe-l'œil. In addition to the crucifixion pax itself, its placement in relation to the predellas below plays an important role. Angelico placed the Entombment of Christ predella directly under the crucifixion on the main panel, which gives the altarpiece a Eucharistic function. The positioning connects the crucifixion and entombment thematically and visually so that one succeeds the other. The crucifixion pax may also allude to a connection between Saints Cosmas and Damian as they too were condemned to the cross, as shown at the right end of the predella strip. The comparison of Christ to the patron saints elevates the patron saints further on a pedestal. The pax, thanks to the trompe-l'œil effect, reminds the viewer that the worlds of Man and Christ are connected. Through the combination of religious and political innuendo, Angelico lauds the Medici family, insinuating that Divine Will determined their political fortunes of the city over which Cosimo was exercising more and more control.

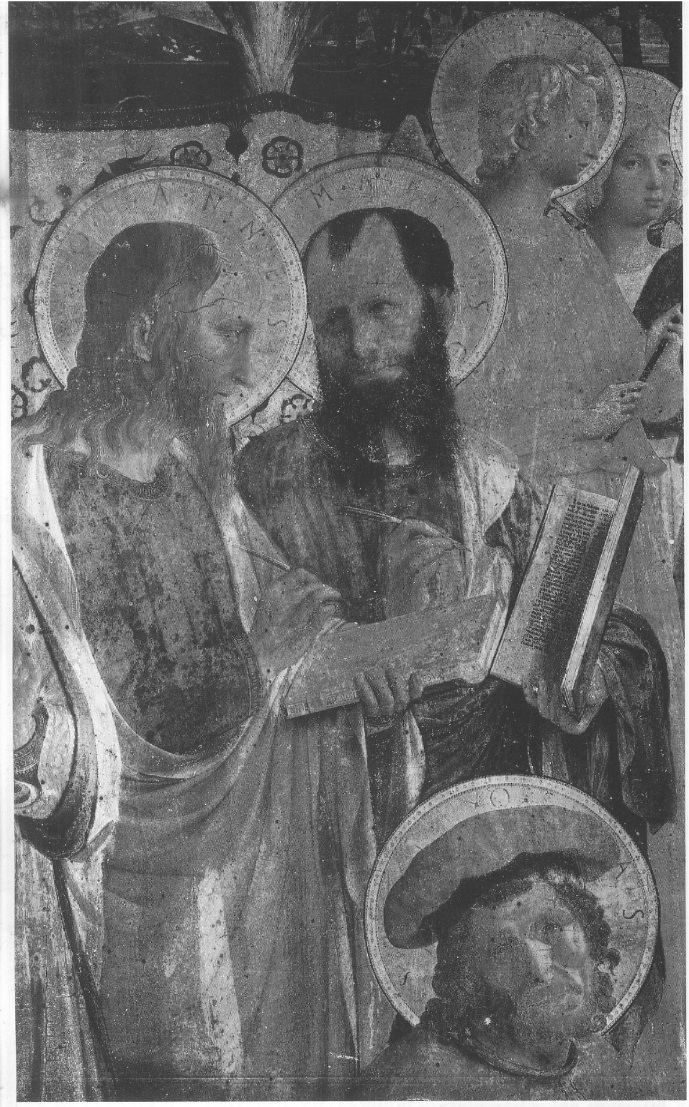
Detail of St. Mark holding Mark's Gospel above St. Cosmas' head.

St. Mark is depicted holding an open codex directly above Saint Cosmas's head. The book is a very important symbol as it links the two saints to original disciples of Jesus. The book is opened to Chapter 7 of Mark's Gospel in which the evangelist relays how Jesus preached in the synagogue and provoked astonishment. One line in the chapter says, "And they [the apostles] anointed with oil man that were sick and healed them." It is no mere coincidence that Angelico placed this healing text above the Saint Cosmas's head. As physician saints with healing abilities, Saints Cosmas and Damian are linked as disciples of Jesus. Angelico uses text in his altarpiece in an expansive and allusive way, going beyond the verses actually inscribed in the painting.

The landscape and garlands of roses have a liturgical component to them as well. Sirach Chapter 24 says, "I was exalted like a cedar in Lebanon and as a cypress tree on Mount Zion. I was exalted like a palm tree in Cades and like a rose in Jericho, and as a fair olive tree in a pleasant field, and grew up as a plane tree by the water." The painted landscape contains various palm, cypress, orange, and pomegranate trees. The roses mentioned in the text hang in the altarpiece, almost by an invisible thread. In the back, velvet-soft hills ring the shore of a wide placid sea stretching beneath a cloud-filled sky to the horizon, just above the Virgin Mary and Child. One can surely infer that the landscape was not painted the way it was for simple aesthetic purposes, but to connect it to the liturgical Sirach text as well.

Detail of the orb Jesus holds in his left hand.

In the very center of the picture, the nude Christ Child is portrayed as the King of Kings and Divine Ruler on his throne. His dependence on his mother's physical support is almost ambiguous. Jesus holds up his right hand in blessing and an orb in his left hand. Jesus's right hand, as seen in many other religious works, blesses all who aim their prayers and attention towards him, members of the choir included; it signifies his authority. His left hand holds the royal orb. This orb is a map of the world and upon close inspection, one can see that the Holy Land is marked by a star on the orb. This exemplifies the loyalty one would have towards Jesus and the faith one would have in his knowledge of the earth and how it should be run.

The curtains and roses featured in the upper corners of the altarpiece are very significant as well. The drawn curtains are pulled back beyond the sides of the frame, literally unveiling what is hidden behind. But because the curtains are not fully drawn, one can speculate that this fictive image of heaven is not one to be taken for granted because at any moment, the curtains may close. Similarly, the pendulous garlands of white, pink, and red roses emphasize the delicate, transitory scene. Just as flowers die without water, so too may the scene disappear if not appreciated enough.

The rich, elegant Anatolian carpet embellishing the royal enclosure bears the yellow border marked around by the red Medici palle. It also features the zodiacal Cancer and Pisces, possibly symbolizing the beginning and end of the Council of Florence. The carpet is just another way the Medici could make their statement of political power through religious art.

== Religious significance ==
Fra Angelico planned the San Marco Altarpiece's iconography around Dominican themes. Within the painting, Angelico references practices of the Dominican Mass. Just as the deacon and subdeacon knelt while helping the Dominican priest during Mass, Saints Cosmas and Damian kneel in this altarpiece. The priest would also stand in the center of the altar during Mass to reenact the sacrifice of Christ. Angelico incorporates this religious practice through the vertically directed pax of the crucified Christ in the center to lead the viewer's eyes to Mary holding Jesus. The saints surrounding the Virgin and Child seem representative of the Dominican Congregation at large.

Dominican altarpieces traditionally stressed the Dominican Order's relationship to Christ and the apostles. The Dominicans saw Christ as playing an intermediary in the relationship between Man and God. In Dialogue, Dominican Saint Catherine of Siena wrote "Christ is a bridge stretching from heaven to earth, joining the earth of man’s humanity with the greatness of the Godhead." The crucifixion pax, which as aforementioned is used to allow the viewer to approach the painting to a certain point, also bridges Christ's Passion and the world of God to the world of Man. It emphasizes the remoteness of the painted realm, but also the possibility of transcendence through Christ and sacrifice.

Matin's Hymn is another text Angelico alludes to in the painting. The hymn says, "He who made all things held the whole world in his hand, even while in his mother’s womb." The positioning of the Child in the San Marco Altarpiece is connected to this text. As Jesus sits nakedly on his mother's lap and grasps the royal orb and map of the world in his left hand, there is sense of vulnerable infancy given to him as if he were still dependent on his mother in her womb, but he nonetheless literally possesses the world in his hands, no matter how young he is.

Saint Thomas Aquinas, one of the greatest Dominicans to have lived, composed the Latin phrase Contemplata Aliis Tradere, which translates as "To pass on to others the things contemplated." Saint Mark's open codex which discusses Christ sending his disciples to preach relates to this text. Saint Mark turns the strictly theological and liturgical aspects of the altarpiece ("things contemplated") towards their end in preaching ("passing it on to others"). Saint Aquinas also said that the sacrament of the Eucharist creates a spiritual community that is an imperfect version of that enjoyed by saints in heaven, which is very much reminiscent of the San Marco Altarpiece's layout.

The direct allusions to Dominican practices and other religious symbols complement Vasari's observation that Fra Angelico's artistic symbols and figures express the depth and sincerity of his Christian piety.

== Restoration ==
The San Marco Altarpiece faced a major cleaning in the 19th century. The cleaning using caustic soda, rubbing off the surface of the painting down to the underpainting. This caused the painting to lose much of its glaze that imparted the nuances of light and color. Any subtle modulations of color and light used by Angelico to heighten the still-moving pathos of faces like that of St. Lawrence were removed. There are still minor traces of cast shadows towards the bottom edges of the draperies in the painting, which are indicative of how Angelico gave the medieval equation of earthly and heavenly beauty new immediacy by translating it into the rational language of a representational style. In addition, as Angelico implies in other ways, glazing was a technique used to create yet another boundary between the real world and the pictorial illusion.

A new treatment was carried out in 2018-2021, at the Opificio delle Pietre Dure in Florence, accomplishing outstanding results.
