= The Vision of Saint Bernard (Filippino Lippi) =

Painting by Filippino Lippi

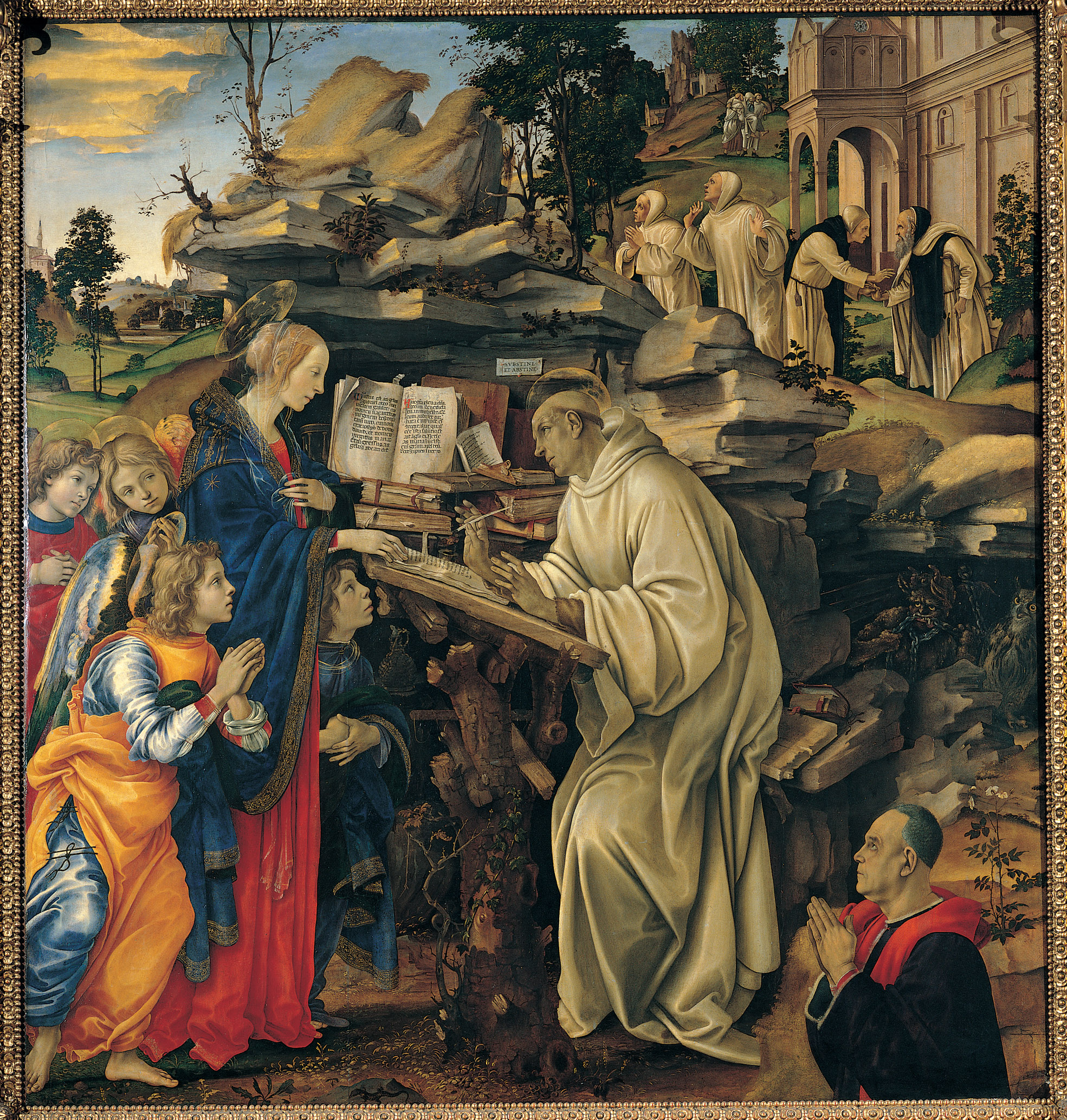
- Artist: Filippino Lippi
- Year: c. 1485–1487
- Medium: Oil on panel
- Dimensions: 210 cm × 195 cm (83 in × 77 in)
- Location: Badia Fiorentina, Florence

The Vision of Saint Bernard (or the Apparition of the Virgin to Saint Bernard) is an oil painting on panel by the Italian Renaissance painter Filippino Lippi, completed around 1485–1487. It is housed in the Badia Fiorentina, a church in Florence.

The picture was commissioned for the chapel of Francesco del Pugliese by the latter's son Piero, who is portrayed in the lower right corner in the traditional praying posture of the donor portrait.

It is one of the most admired of Lippi's works, noted for its powerful, Flemish-inspired chromatism and attention to details, which contribute in turning the mystical apparition of the Virgin to Saint Bernard into a scene of everyday life. The composition is set in a rocky landscape in which the saint, while writing on his lectern, is suddenly visited by the Virgin. Behind Bernard's shoulders is depicted the demon biting his chains; this is a reference to a medieval hymn celebrating the Virgin as the liberator of humanity from the chains of their sins.

A scroll on a rock contains a verse by the 3rd-century Stoic writer Epictetus: Sustine et abstine ("Carry on and abstain"), a hint to Bernard's teachings.

Some scholars have identified in the faces of the Virgin and the angels on the left the portraits of the donor's wife and sons.
