= Virgin and Child with Saints Stephen, Jerome and Maurice =

Virgin and Child with Saints Stephen, Jerome and Maurice may refer to:

- Virgin and Child with Saints Stephen, Jerome and Maurice (Titian, Paris)
- Virgin and Child with Saints Stephen, Jerome and Maurice (Titian, Vienna)
