= Virgin and Child with Saints Stephen, Jerome and Maurice (Titian, Paris) =

Painting by Titian

- La Vierge à l' Enfant avec saint Étienne, saint Jérôme et saint Maurice (French)
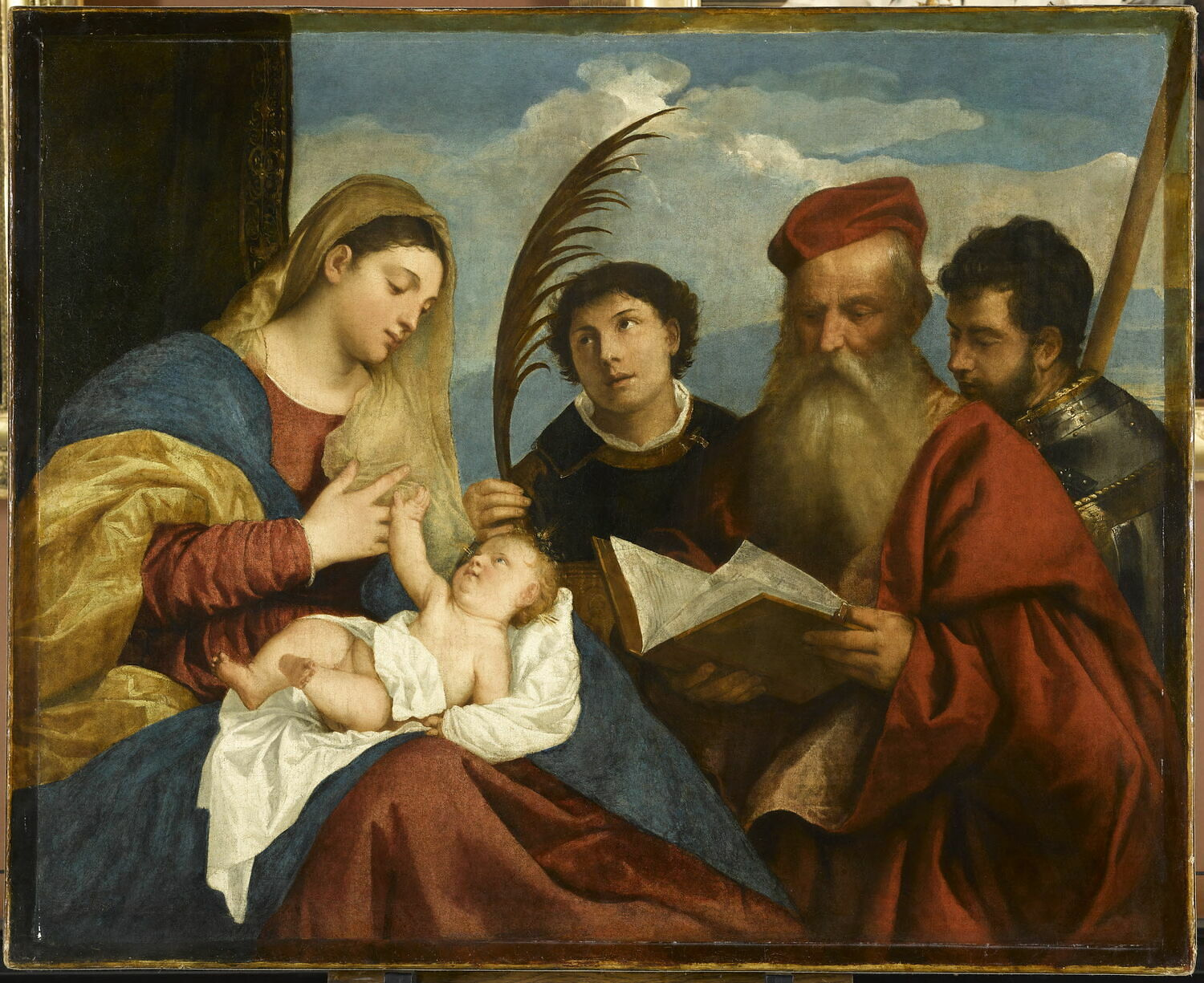
- Year: c. 1510–1525
- Medium: Oil on canvas
- Dimensions: 112.5 cm × 143.2 cm (44.3 in × 56.4 in)
- Location: Louvre; Paris
- Accession: INV 742

The Virgin and Child with Saints Stephen, Jerome and Maurice (French: La Vierge à l' Enfant avec saint Étienne, saint Jérôme et saint Maurice), also called the Virgin with Three Saints, is a religious painting by Titian, from c. 1510–1525. It hangs in the Louvre, in Paris.

== History ==
The Virgin and Child are shown accompanied by the saints Stephen, Jerome, and Maurice. Gronau thinks that this picture may belong to the period about 1508 to 1510. The Louvre dates it to between 1510 and 1525. The type of the Virgin here is like the one in the Madrid Sacra Conversazione and the Annunciation in Treviso. The figure of Saint Stephen is comparable with the servant's head in the Salome in the Galleria Doria Pamphilj, Rome. A type like the Saint Jerome is to be found in one of the Padua frescoes.

The picture entered the Louvre from the collection of Louis XIV.

== See also ==
- Virgin and Child with Saints Stephen, Jerome and Maurice (Titian, Vienna)
- List of works by Titian
- Sacra conversazione

== Sources ==
- Gronau, Georg (1904). Titian. London: Duckworth and Co; New York: Charles Scribner's Sons. pp. 282–283.
- Ricketts, Charles (1910). Titian. London: Methuen & Co. Ltd. pp. 50–51, 175, 178, plate xxxi.
- "La Vierge à l' Enfant avec saint Étienne, saint Jérôme et saint Maurice". Louvre. Retrieved 21 November 2022.
