= Virgin and Child with Saints Stephen, Jerome and Maurice (Titian, Vienna) =

Painting by Titian

- Maria mit Kind und den Hll. Stephanus, Hieronymus und Mauritius (German)
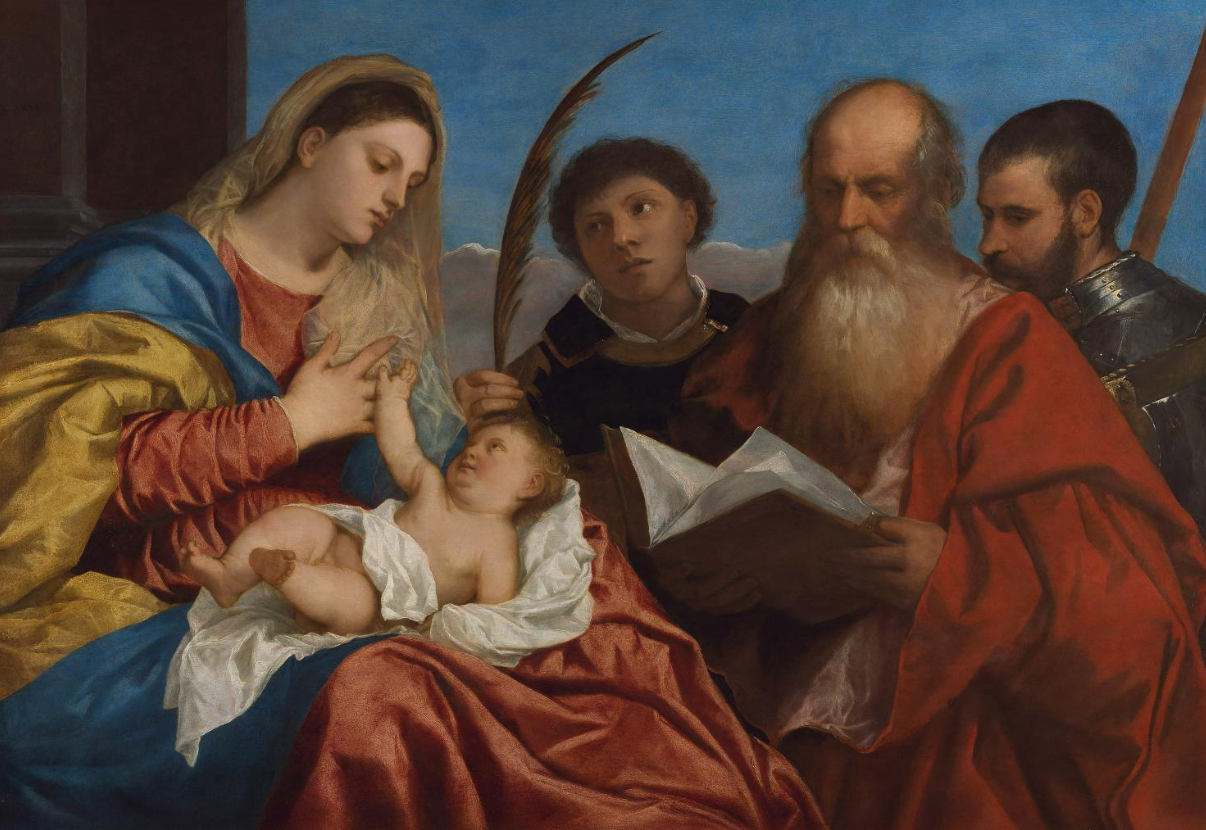
- Artist: Titian
- Year: c. 1520
- Medium: Oil on poplar
- Dimensions: 93.3 cm × 138.2 cm (36.7 in × 54.4 in)
- Location: Kunsthistorisches Museum; Vienna

The Virgin and Child with Saints Stephen, Jerome and Maurice (German: Maria mit Kind und den Hll. Stephanus, Hieronymus und Mauritius), also called the Virgin with Three Saints, is a religious painting by Titian which hangs in the Kunsthistorisches Museum in Vienna.

== Attribution ==
According to Georg Gronau, the painting in Vienna is an inferior replica to Titian's painting of the same subject in the Louvre. Charles Ricketts, however, lists both the "flamboyant" version in the Louvre and this "more elaborate and earlier" version in Vienna as authentic Titians.

== Copies ==
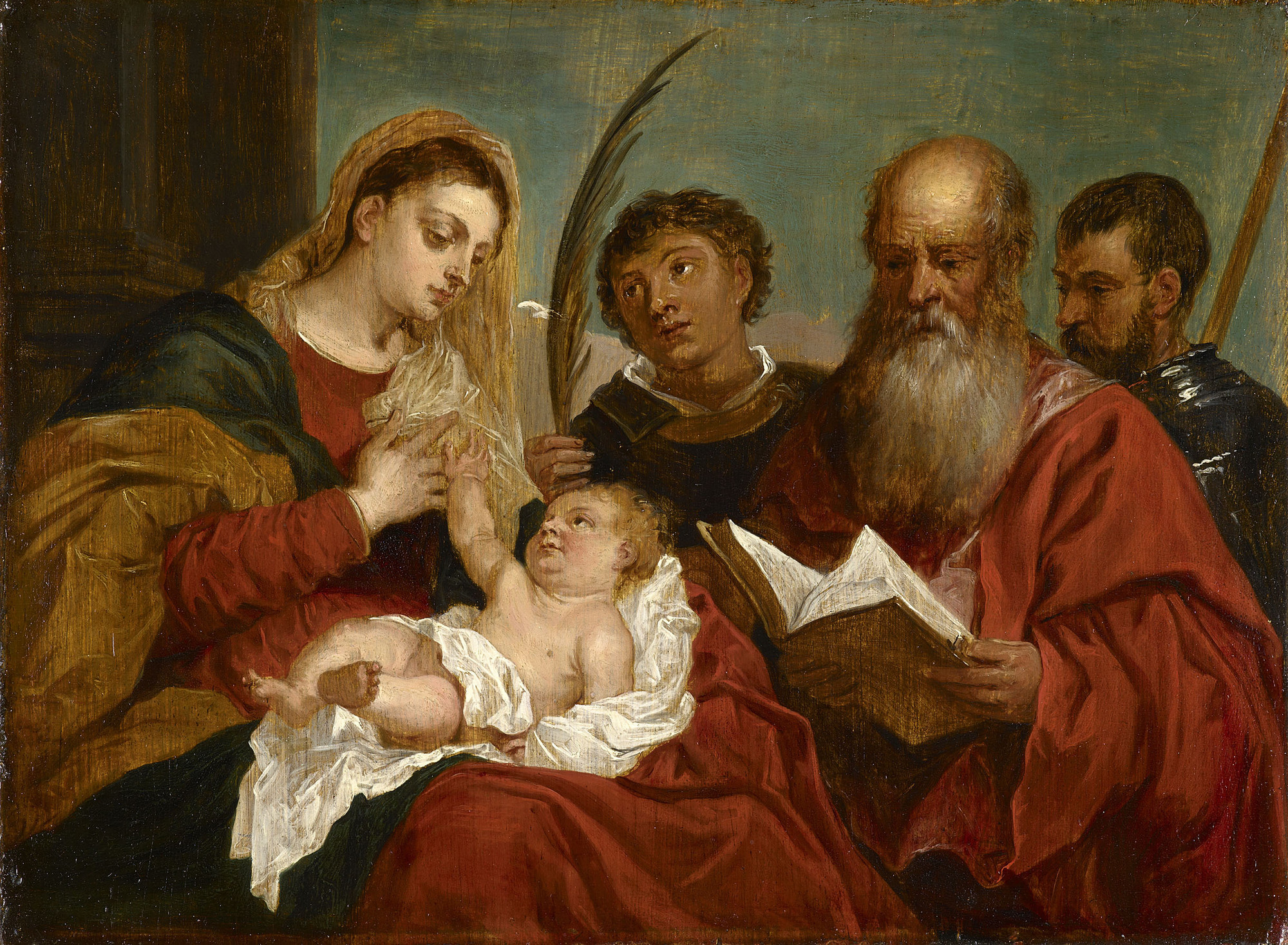
Copy by David Teniers the Younger after Titian, c. 1656

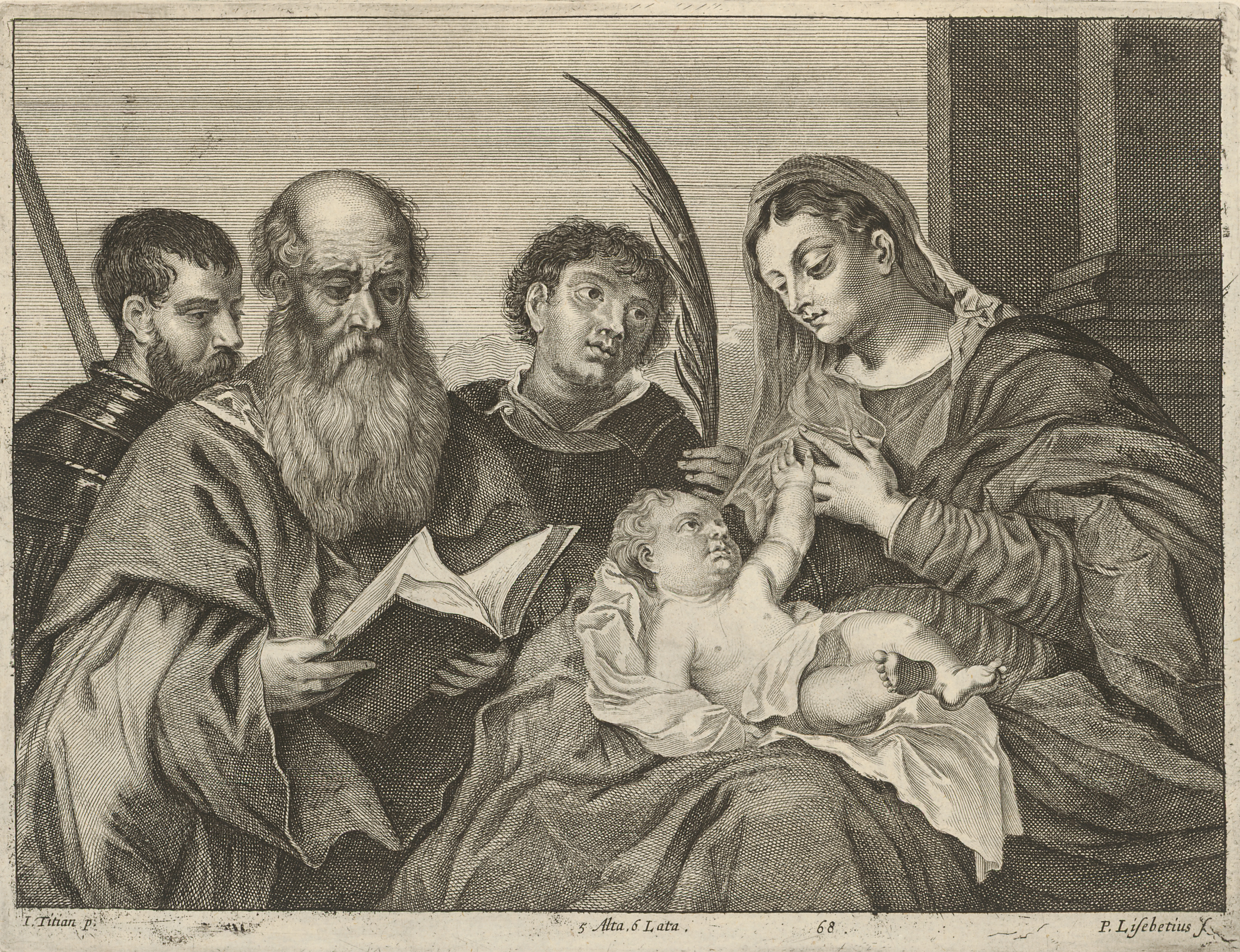
Engraving by Peter van Lisebetten after Teniers, Theatrum Pictorium, 1673

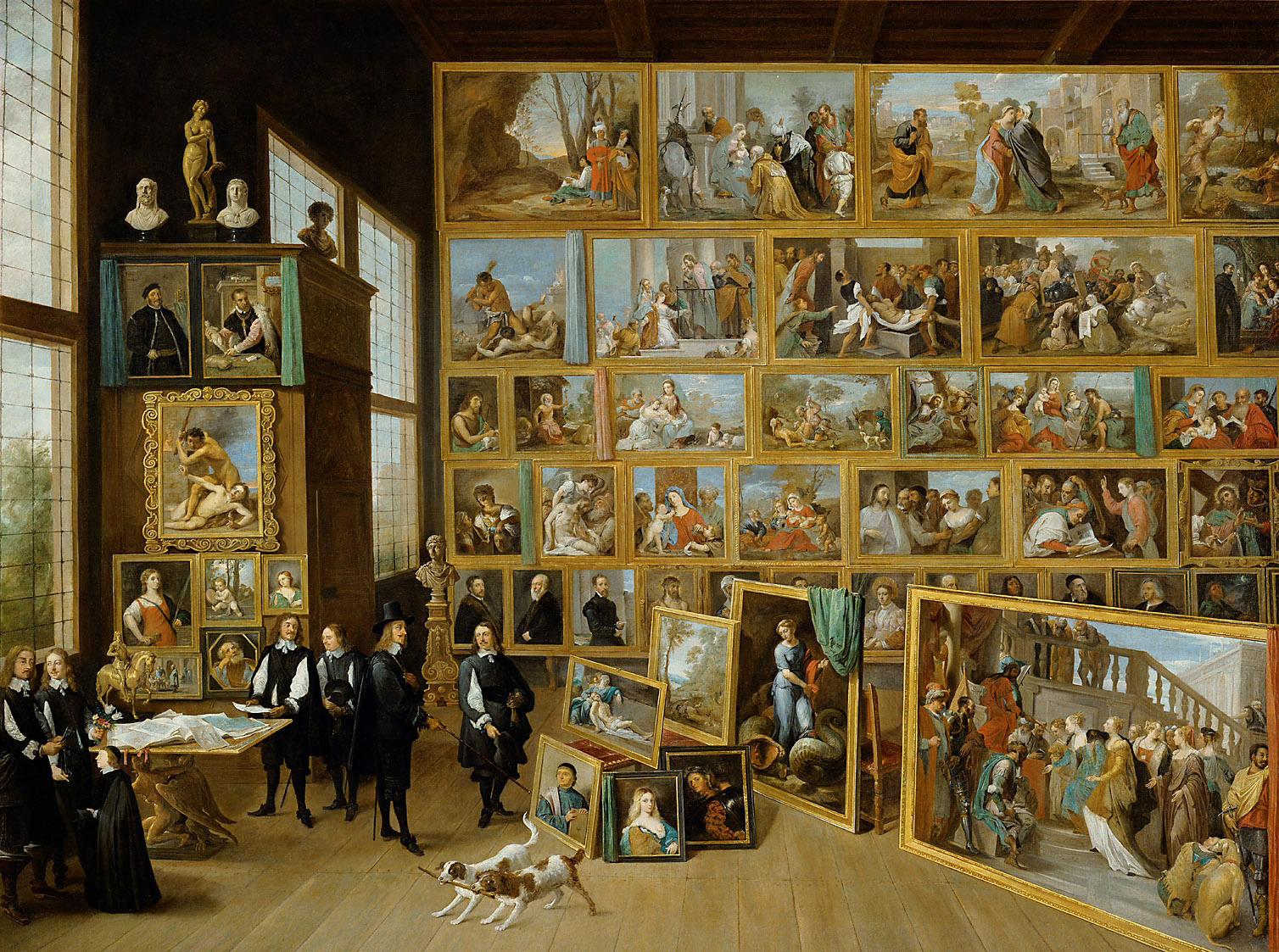
Gallery of Archduke Leopold Wilhelm in Brussels (Vienna, c. 1650)

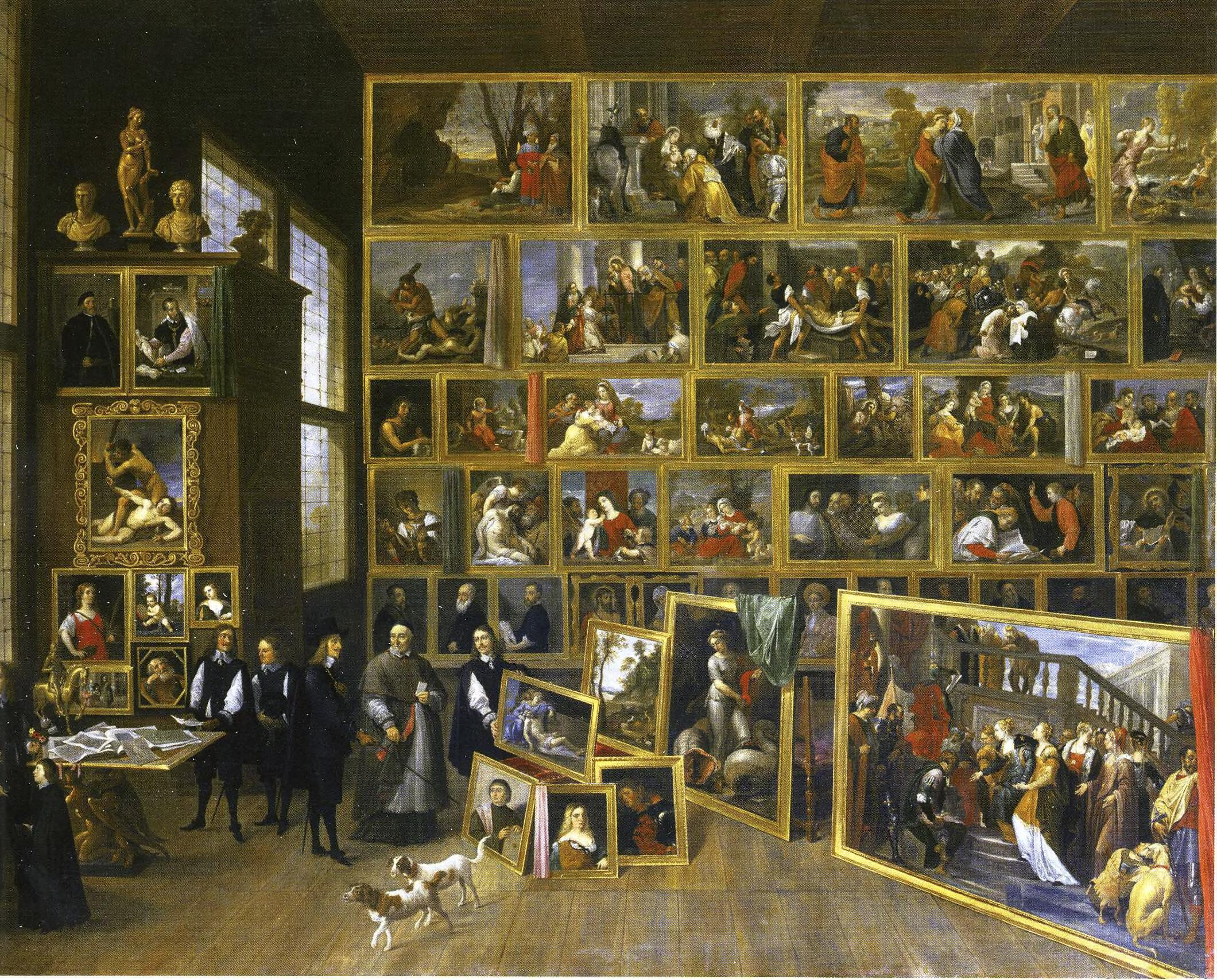
Gallery of Archduke Leopold Wilhelm in Brussels (Petworth, 1651)

== See also ==
- Virgin and Child with Saints Stephen, Jerome and Maurice (Titian, Paris)
- List of works by Titian
- Sacra conversazione

== Sources ==
- Gronau, Georg (1904). Titian. London: Duckworth and Co; New York: Charles Scribner's Sons. pp. 282–283.
- Ricketts, Charles (1910). Titian. London: Methuen & Co. Ltd. pp. 50–51, 175, 178, plate xxxi.
- "Maria mit Kind und den Hll. Stephanus, Hieronymus und Mauritius". Kunsthistorisches Museum Wien. Retrieved 21 November 2022.
