= Gallery of Archduke Leopold Wilhelm in Brussels (Petworth) =

Painting by David Teniers the Younger

Archduke Leopold Wilhelm in his Gallery in Brussels
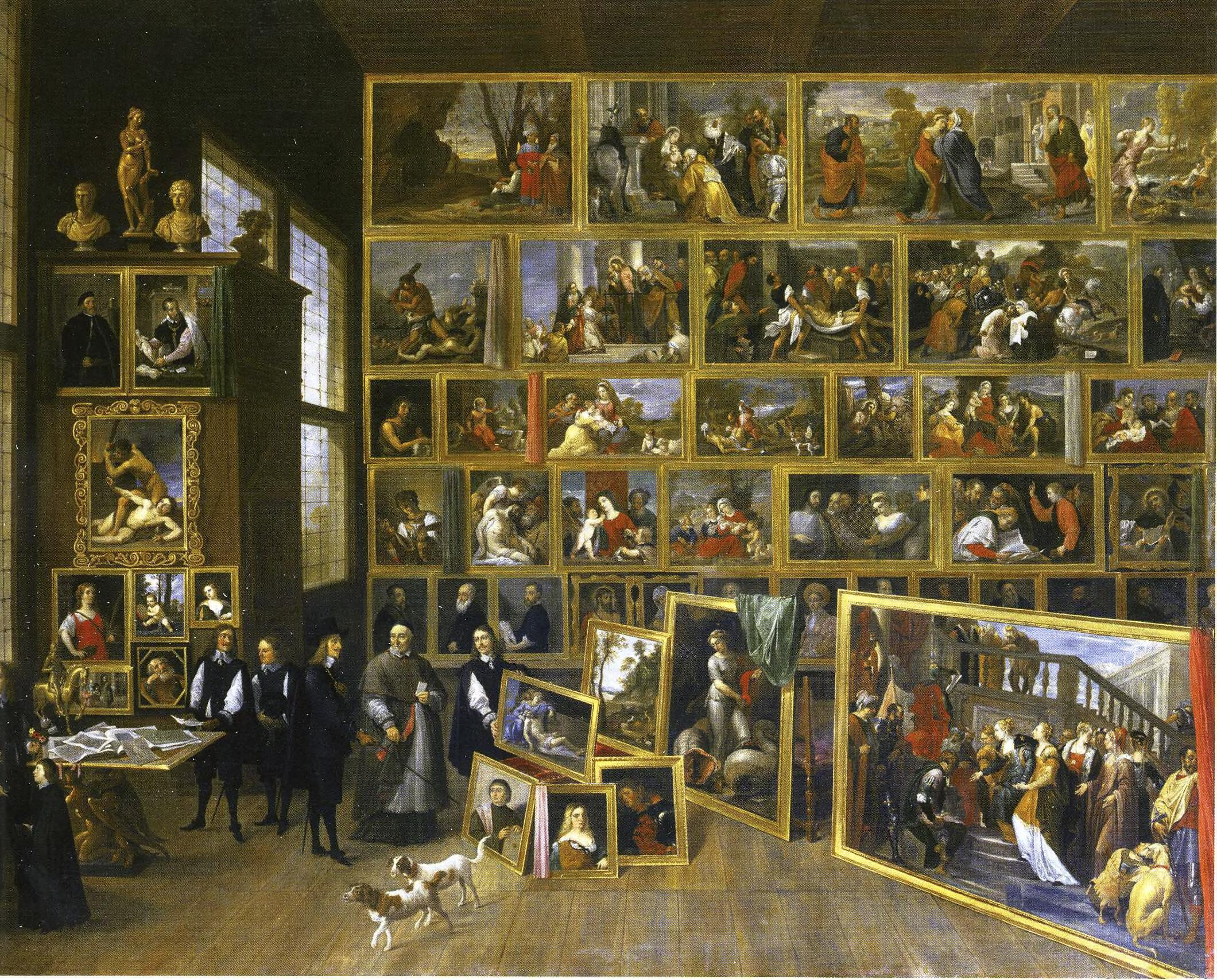
- Artist: David Teniers the Younger
- Year: 1651
- Dimensions: 127 cm (50 in) × 163.8 cm (64.5 in)
- Location: Petworth House
- Collection: Petworth House
- Accession no.: 486159
- Identifiers: RKDimages ID: 232902; Art UK artwork ID: the-brussels-picture-gallery-of-the-archduke-leopold-wilhelm-of-austria-16141662-219668

Gallery of Archduke Leopold Wilhelm in Brussels is a 1651 painting of Archduke Leopold Wilhelm's Italian art collection by the Flemish Baroque painter David Teniers the Younger, now held in Petworth House in England.

The painting shows the Archduke as a collector with friends admiring a set of paintings. The artist himself is showing his patron and Anthonius Triest, Bishop of Ghent, an example of a Pietà by Annibale Carracci. However, the Bishop is not looking at the painting, but at his protector the Archduke. In 1651 the Bishop held fallen into disfavor in Rome for Jansenism. On the advice of the Archduke he read a letter from Rome denouncing Jansenism to his congregation in 1652, but in 1653 he was suspended until he wrote to Pope Innocent X for forgiveness later that year. The Bishop is identifiable from other portraits made at the time:

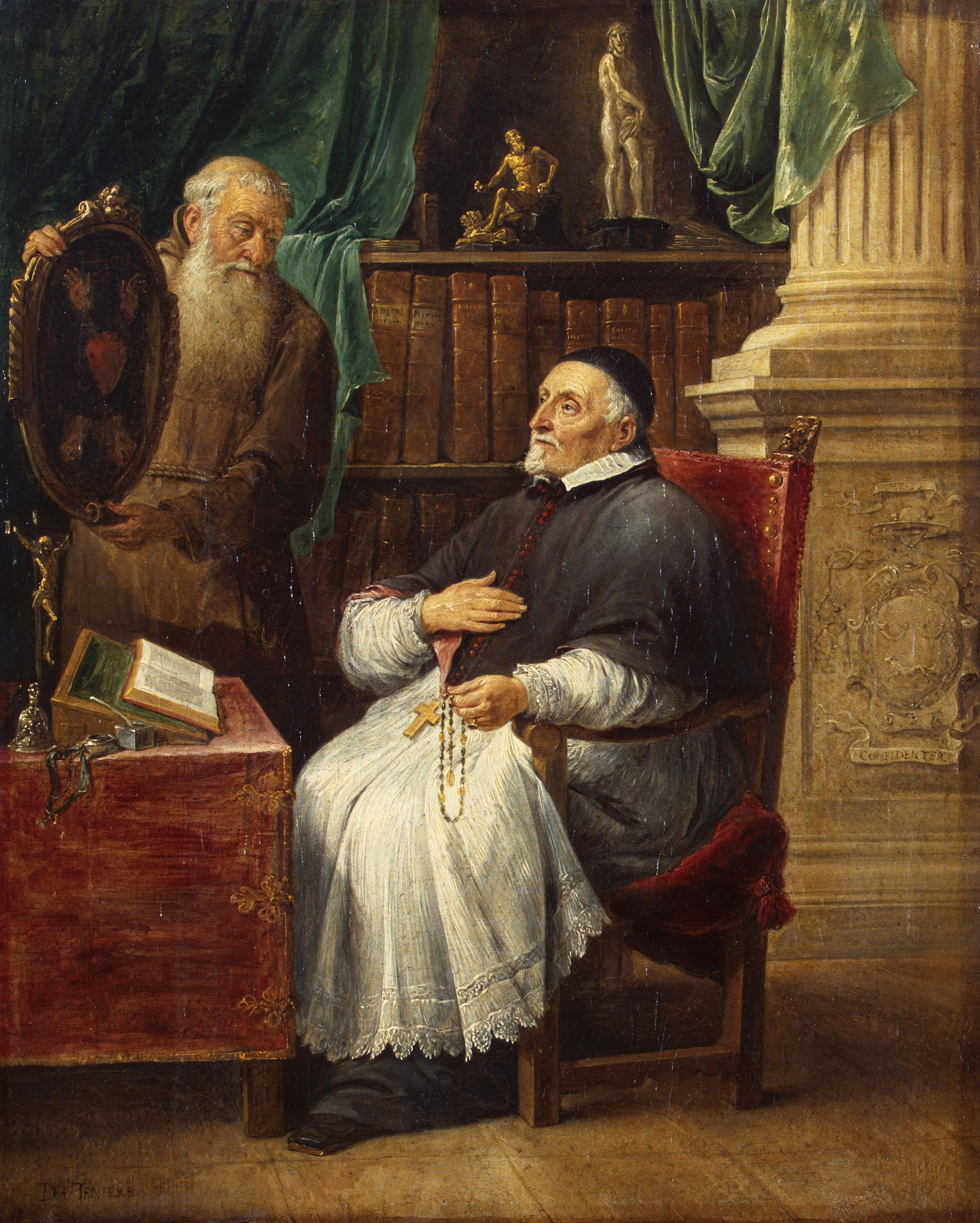
Portrait of the Bishop by David Teniers the Younger in 1652

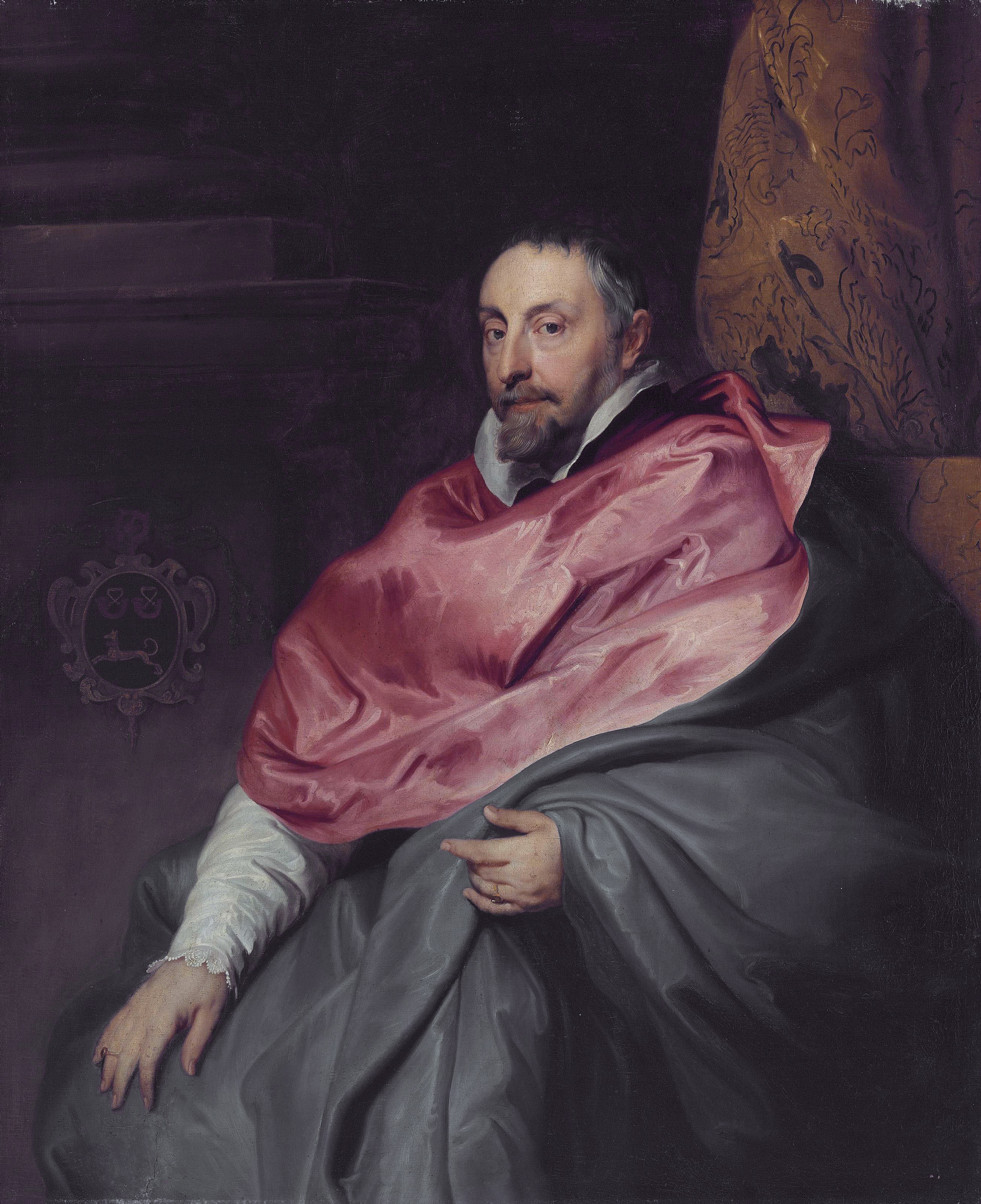
Copy of a portrait by Anthony van Dyck

The paintings are arranged in rows on a rear wall, with several others on the side of the vestibule on the left, and a set that are positioned in the foreground leaning against chairs for inspection.

This painting is one of the first that David Teniers the Younger prepared to document the Archduke's collection before he employed 12 engravers to publish his Theatrum Pictorium, considered the "first illustrated art catalog". He published this book of engravings after the Archduke had moved to Austria and taken his collection with him. It was published in Antwerp in 1659 and again in 1673. Another version of this painting, with the figures arranged differently, is in the collection of the Kunsthistorisches Museum in Vienna.

== List of paintings depicted ==
The following is a list of the recognizable paintings of the collection, not all of which were included in the Italian catalog prepared by Teniers, which was a selection of 243 of the most prized paintings out of a collection of 1300-1400 pieces. Many are still in the Viennese collection. Here is a list of the paintings depicted, which starts with the paintings on the rear wall, running from left to right and from top to bottom. Next listed are the paintings on the left vestibule, and finally the paintings in the foreground propped against chairs:

image	article	painter	year	collection	inventory nr.	catalog code
	The Three Philosophers	Giorgione	1500s	Kunsthistorisches Museum	GG_111	20
	Adoration of the Kings	Paolo Veronese	1585	Kunsthistorisches Museum	GG_1515	123
	Visitation	Palma Vecchio	1522	Kunsthistorisches Museum	GG_56	208
	The Death of Actaeon	Titian	1559	National Gallery	NG6420	73
	Cain and Abel (lost?)	Palma il Giovane				202
	Raising the Young Man of Nain	Paolo Veronese	1560s	Kunsthistorisches Museum	GG_52	124
	Carrying Lazarus	Il Pordenone	before 1551	Prague Castle Picture Gallery		110
	Carrying the Cross (led by a man on horseback)	Giovanni Cariani				166
	Holy family with donors	unknown				
	John the Baptist	Palma Vecchio	1527	Kunsthistorisches Museum	GG_2158	
	St. Hieronymous	Dosso Dossi	1620s	Kunsthistorisches Museum	GG_263	232
	Holy family with St Anne and St John	Andrea Schiavone	1552	Kunsthistorisches Museum	GG_325	
	The Good Samaritan	Francesco Bassano the Younger	1575	Kunsthistorisches Museum	GG_12	152
	Christ in a Landscape	Tintoretto				100
	Holy Family with Sts Catherine and Barbara and John the Baptist	Palma Vecchio	1521	Kunsthistorisches Museum	GG_60	206
	Madonna with child and Saints	Titian	1520s	Kunsthistorisches Museum	GG_93	68
	Judith with the head of Holofernes	Carlo Saraceni	1613	Kunsthistorisches Museum	GG_41	39
	Pieta	Andrea Schiavone	c. 1550	Gemäldegalerie Alte Meister	Gal.-Nr. 274	133
	Madonna of the Cherries	Titian	1516	Kunsthistorisches Museum	GG_118	62
	Holy Family with St. John	Palma Vecchio	1520	Uffizi	950	
	Christ and the Adulteress	Titian	1520	Kunsthistorisches Museum	GG_114	67
	Jesus among the Doctors of the Faith	Jusepe Ribera	1630	Kunsthistorisches Museum	GG_326	141
	Christ carrying the cross meets Veronica	Jacopo Bassano				144
	Portrait of a Bearded Man	manner of Titian	c. 1560	Kunsthistorisches Museum	GG_315	53
	Portrait of a White-Bearded Man	Tintoretto	1570	Kunsthistorisches Museum	GG_25	103
	Orator Giovanni Pietro Maffei	Giovanni Battista Moroni	1560	Kunsthistorisches Museum	GG_88	230
	Ecce Homo	Titian	1550s	Brukenthal National Museum	3186	78
	Mater Dolorosa (pendant of Ecce Homo)	Alessandro Varotari	1550s	unknown		239
	hidden portrait	unknown				
	hidden portrait	unknown				
	Portrait of Cecilia Gozzadini	Parmigianino	1530	Kunsthistorisches Museum	GG_327	
	hidden portrait	unknown				
	hidden portrait	unknown				
	Self-portrait	Titian	1550	Gemäldegalerie	163	
	Portrait of Gian Giacomo Bartolotti da Parma	Titian	1520	Kunsthistorisches Museum	GG_94	57
	Violin Player	Giorgione	1500s			15
	hidden portrait	unknown				
	Portrait of Fabrizio Salvaresio	Titian	1558	Kunsthistorisches Museum	GG_1605	89
	Portrait of Jacopo Strada	Titian	1567	Kunsthistorisches Museum	GG_81	92
	Cain Kills Abel	Bartolomeo Manfredi	c 1600	Kunsthistorisches Museum	GG_363	
	Saint Catherine	Venetian painter	1625	Kunsthistorisches Museum	GG_59	58
	Little Tambourine Player	Venetian painter	1510	Kunsthistorisches Museum	GG_96	80
	Young Woman in Green Dress	Palma Vecchio	1513	Kunsthistorisches Museum	GG_66	196
	Tobit and Tobias burying the dead Israelite	David Teniers the Younger after Domenico Fetti	1656	Courtauld Gallery	P.1978.PG.434	216
	Old Man looking Up (oval)	Guido Reni	1637	Kunsthistorisches Museum	GG_243	226
	Portrait of a man with a book	Vincenzo Catena	1520	Kunsthistorisches Museum	GG_87	242
	Violante	Titian	1515s	Kunsthistorisches Museum	GG_65	194
	The Bravo	Titian	1520	Kunsthistorisches Museum	GG_64	23
	Pietà	Annibale Carracci	1603	Kunsthistorisches Museum	GG_230	40
	Unknown landscape	unknown				
	Saint Margaret and the Dragon	Raphael	1518	Kunsthistorisches Museum	GG_171	2
	Esther before Ahasuerus	Paolo Veronese	1555	Uffizi	912	125
