= Gallery of Archduke Leopold Wilhelm in Brussels (Brussels) =

Painting by David Teniers the Younger

Archduke Leopold Wilhelm of Austria in his Gallery
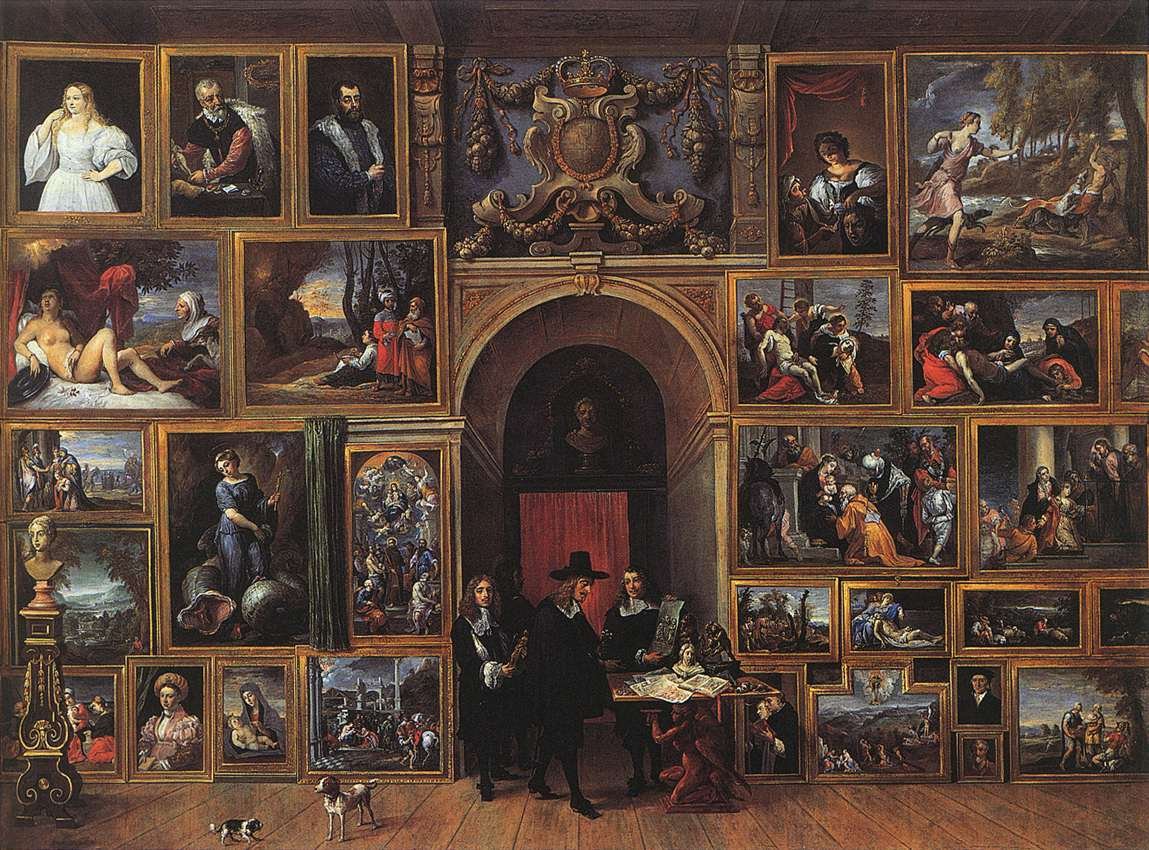
- Artist: David Teniers the Younger
- Year: 1651
- Dimensions: 96 cm (38 in) × 129 cm (51 in)
- Location: Oldmasters Museum
- Accession: 2569

Gallery of Archduke Leopold Wilhelm in Brussels is a 1651 painting of Archduke Leopold Wilhelm's Italian art collection by the Flemish Baroque painter David Teniers the Younger, now in the Royal Museums of Fine Arts of Belgium.

The painting shows the Archduke as a collector admiring a set of prints on a table. The table has been documented as a creation of the sculptor Adriaen de Vries depicting Ganymede. The artist himself is showing his patron an example of a print. The paintings are arranged in rows on a rear wall, and is one of the first that David Teniers the Younger prepared to document the Archduke's collection before he employed 12 engravers to publish his Theatrum Pictorium, considered the "first illustrated art catalog". He published this book of engravings after the Archduke had moved to Austria and taken his collection with him. It was published in Antwerp in 1659 and again in 1673.

This painting was purchased for the museum's collection in 1873 from J. Nieuwenhuys in Brussels.

== List of paintings depicted ==
The following list is of the recognisable paintings of the collection, not all of which were included in the Italian catalog prepared by Teniers, which was a selection of 243 of the most prized paintings out of a collection of 1300-1400 pieces. Many are still in the Viennese collection. The list begins with the paintings on the rear wall, running from left to right and from top to bottom.

image	article	painter	year	collection	inventory nr.	catalog code
	Lady with Long Hair	Palma Vecchio				
	Portrait of Jacopo Strada	Titian	1567	Kunsthistorisches Museum	GG_81	92
	Portrait of an unknown man	Titian				55
	Judith with the head of Holofernes	Carlo Saraceni	1613	Kunsthistorisches Museum	GG_41	39
	The Death of Actaeon	Titian	1559	National Gallery	NG6420	73
	Danaë	Titian?		Different to any surviving version	GG_90	74
	The Three Philosophers	Giorgione	1500s	Kunsthistorisches Museum	GG_111	20
	Descent from the Cross	Tintoretto	1547	Kunsthistorisches Museum	GG_1565	109
	Lamentation	Palma il Giovane	1600s	Kunsthistorisches Museum	GG_2	
	unknown					
	Aeneas Takes Leave of Dido	Andrea Schiavone	1555	Kunsthistorisches Museum	GG_5818	135
	Landscape					
	Saint Margaret and the Dragon	Raphael	1518	Kunsthistorisches Museum	GG_171	2
	Ascension?					
	Adoration of the Kings	Paolo Veronese	1585	Kunsthistorisches Museum	GG_1515	123
	Raising the Young Man of Nain	Paolo Veronese	1560s	Kunsthistorisches Museum	GG_52	124
	Blind Leading the Blind	Domenico Fetti	1620s	Staatliche Kunstsammlungen Dresden	644	215
	Pietà	Annibale Carracci	1603	Kunsthistorisches Museum	GG_230	40
	Shepherds and Sheep	one of the Bassani, whereabouts unknown, possibly Tenier's copy is shown	1650s	Metropolitan Museum of Art	89.15.22	
	Unknown					
	Holy Family with Mary Magdalene	Palma Vecchio	1520-1525	Kunsthistorisches Museum	GG_2161	
	Portrait of Cecilia Gozzadini	Parmigianino	1530	Kunsthistorisches Museum	GG_327	
	Madonna and Child	Giovanni Bellini	1480-1485	National Gallery of Art		
	Adoration of the Magi					
	St Dominic and St Ursula	Antonello da Messina (copy by David Teniers the Younger)		private collection		
	Scenes from the Life of Christ					
	Portrait of a man in a beret	Jan van Scorel or Maarten van Heemskerck	before 1575	unknown		
	Portrait of a man					
	Marius Curius Dentatus	Andrea Schiavone	1555/1560	Kunsthistorisches Museum	GG_1568	

== Sources ==
- David Teniers and the Theatre of Painting, exhibition 19 October 2006 to 21 January 2007 on website of the Courtauld Institute of Art
