= Madonna and Child with Saint Zechariah =

Painting by Parmigianino

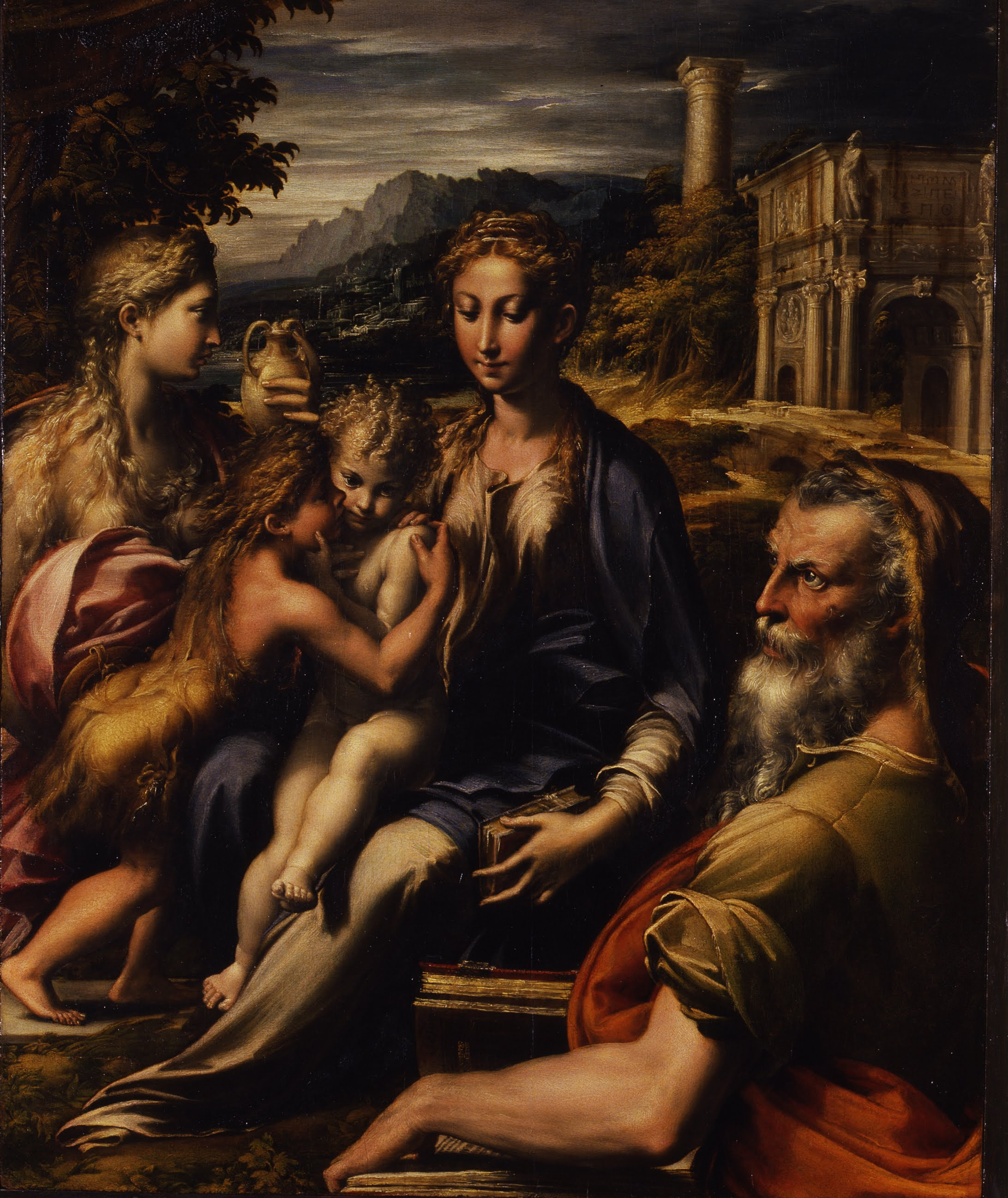
Madonna and Child with Saint Zechariah (c. 1530-1533) by Parmigianino

Madonna and Child with Saint Zechariah is an oil on panel painting by Parmigianino, from c. 1530-1533. It is held in the Uffizi, in Florence. It shows the Madonna and Child with Zechariah, father of John the Baptist.

== History ==
It had arrived in Florence by 1605, when it was first recorded in the city. Conflicting documents survive as to its commission and early life - some copies may have been given as originals, not to be confused with the original version, though recent research indicates a complex history. The earliest definite reference is probably that from 1533 referring to a "Madonna and Child [with] the infant St John the Baptist and Saint Zechariah" sold to Bonifacio Gozzadini from Bologna, husband of the subject of Parmigianino's Portrait of Cecilia Gozzadini. However, other documents clarify the details of the acquisition and - despite past misreadings of them as the commission contract and two payment reminders from Mazzola - they have been correctly interpreted more recently.

The earliest surviving document, a deed for 50 scudi (compared to 33 scudi for the Madonna of the Long Neck) sworn by notary Andrea Ceroti of Parma on 27 October 1533 and sent to Gozzadini, is probably for the sale of the already-completed painting not the original commission. These 50 scudi were never paid, since - as shown by two powers of attorney on 9 October 1535 and 11 January 1538 - Parmiganino commissioned Gozzadini to represent him in a trial in Bologna. This trial was almost certainly linked to the frescoes at Madonna della Steccata in Parma - on 27 September 1535 Parmigianino had received an initial injunction from the Steccata's builders, who wanted to cancel the contract due to delays in completing the frescoes, while the second document falls close to the final deadline for the frescoes' completion. It is very likely that the painter sold the Madonna at an inflated price to pay for his legal defence.

Between 1533 and 1550 the work then had to reach Manzoli in Bologna, where Vasari saw it and erroneously claimed that the Gozzadini family commissioned it. Lamo also saw it in there in 1560, recording senator Giorgio Manzoli as its owner. Lamo and Vasari's mentions have complicated later research, linking the discrepancy with surviving documents to the theoretical presence of an early copy. In 1783 Father Ireneo Affò unwittingly saw the Galleria Corsini replica of the work, long thought to be the original.

The work became widely known through Giulio Bonasone's 1543 print of it. Luigi Lanzi recorded it as perhaps "the most copied [work] in the gallery", listing copies in the Galleria Farnese in Parma (which also held the original), another copy in Uffizi, another in the Pinacoteca Capitolina, another in abbot Mazza's collection in Parma and one each in the Rome-based collections of the Corsini, Borghese and Albani families. Another is recorded in the casa Boscoli in Parma in 1680, perhaps identical to the Corsini family copy, and several were listed in 1948 by Quintavalle. In 1903 Ricci used Vasari to show that the original version was not in fact the Corsini version but that in the Uffizi.

== Bibliography (in Italian) ==
- Luisa Viola, Parmigianino, Grafiche Step editrice, Parma 2007.
- Mario Di Giampaolo ed Elisabetta Fadda, Parmigianino, Keybook, Santarcangelo di Romagna 2002. ISBN 8818-02236-9
- Gloria Fossi, Uffizi, Giunti, Firenze 2004. ISBN 88-09-03675-1
