= Judith with the Head of Holofernes (Saraceni) =

Painting by Carlo Saraceni

Judith with the head of Holofernes
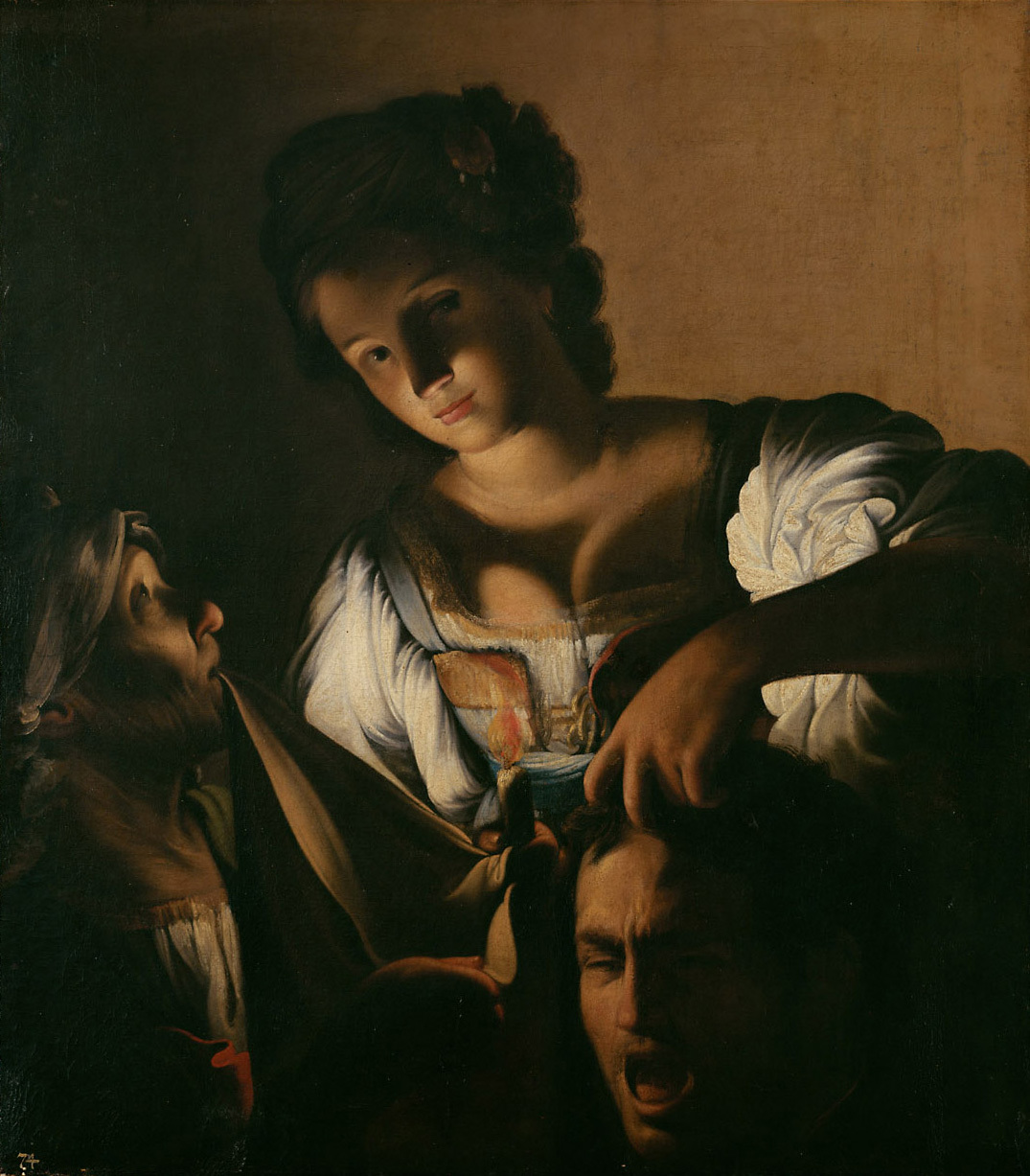
- Artist: Carlo Saraceni
- Year: 1610–1615
- Dimensions: 90 cm (35 in) × 79 cm (31 in)
- Location: Kunsthistorisches Museum
- Accession No.: GG_41

Judith with the head of Holofernes is a 1610–1615 painting by the painter Carlo Saraceni, now held in the Dayton Art Institute in Dayton.

The painting is typical of Saraceni's first decade in Rome where he became influenced by Caravaggio. His use of candlelight is illustrative of the chiaroscuro used by the tenebrists in this period. Another autograph copy is known in the Dayton Art Institute.

This painting was documented in David Teniers the Younger's catalog Theatrum Pictorium of the art collection of Archduke Leopold Wilhelm in 1659 and again in 1673, but the portrait had already enjoyed notoriety in Teniers' portrayals of the Archduke's art collection:

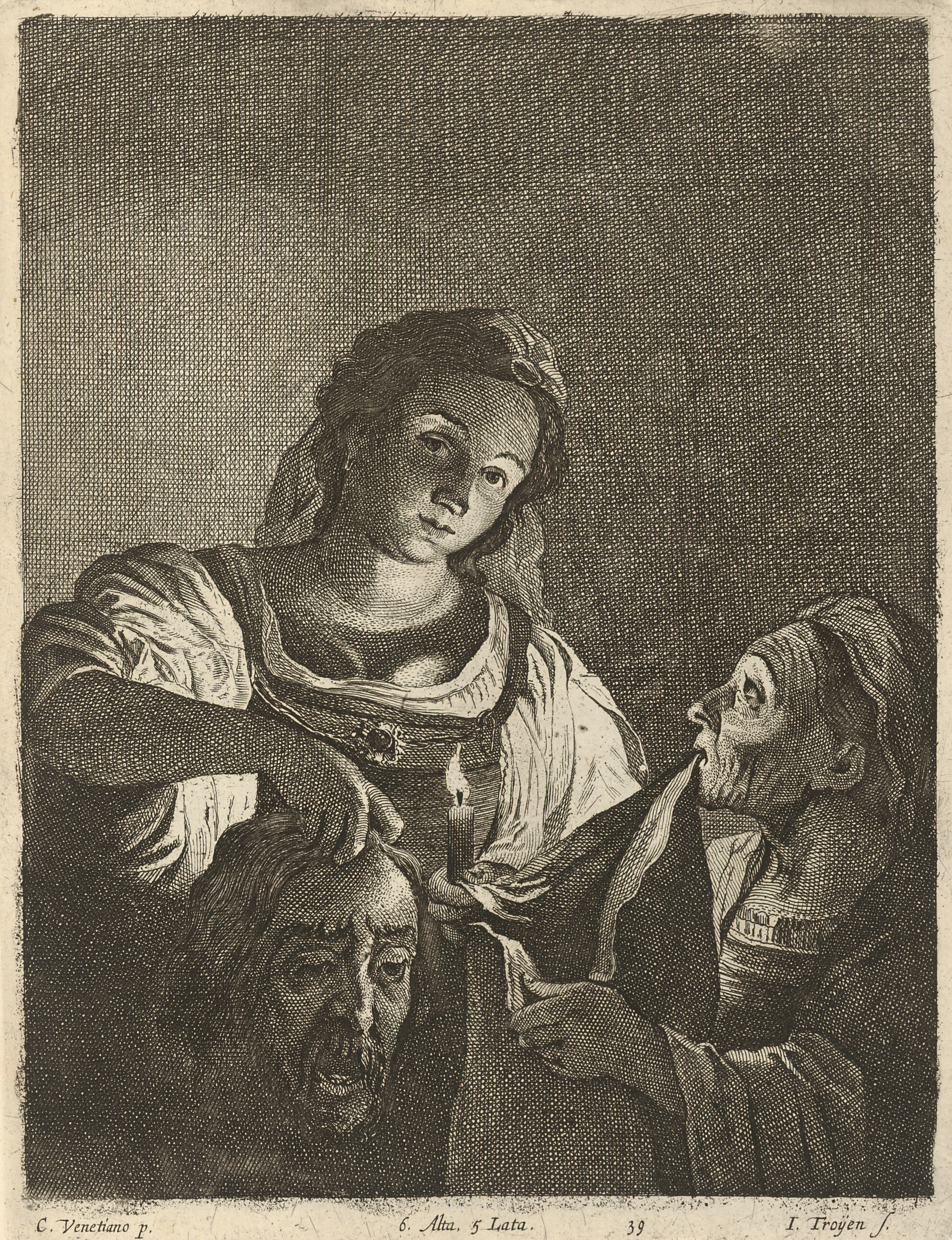
1673 engraving from Teniers' catalog, by Jan van Troyen

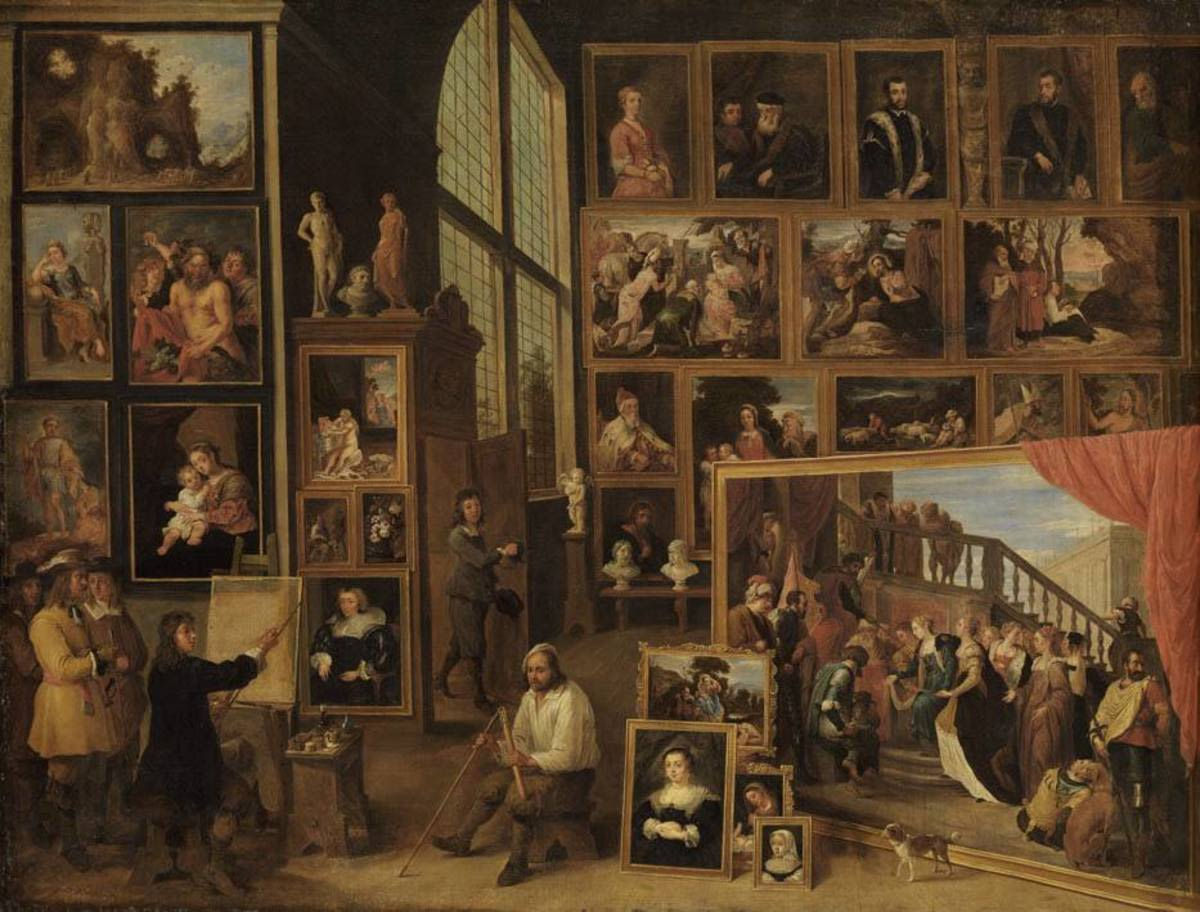

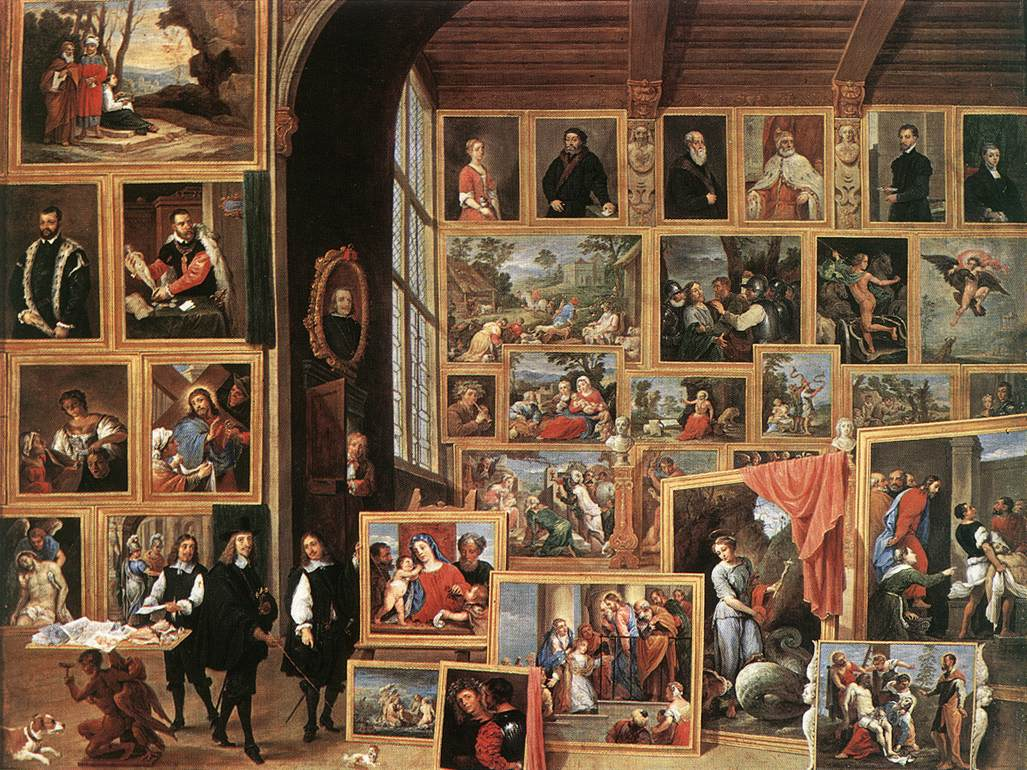
Gallery of Archduke Leopold Wilhelm in Brussels (Schleissheim), 1640

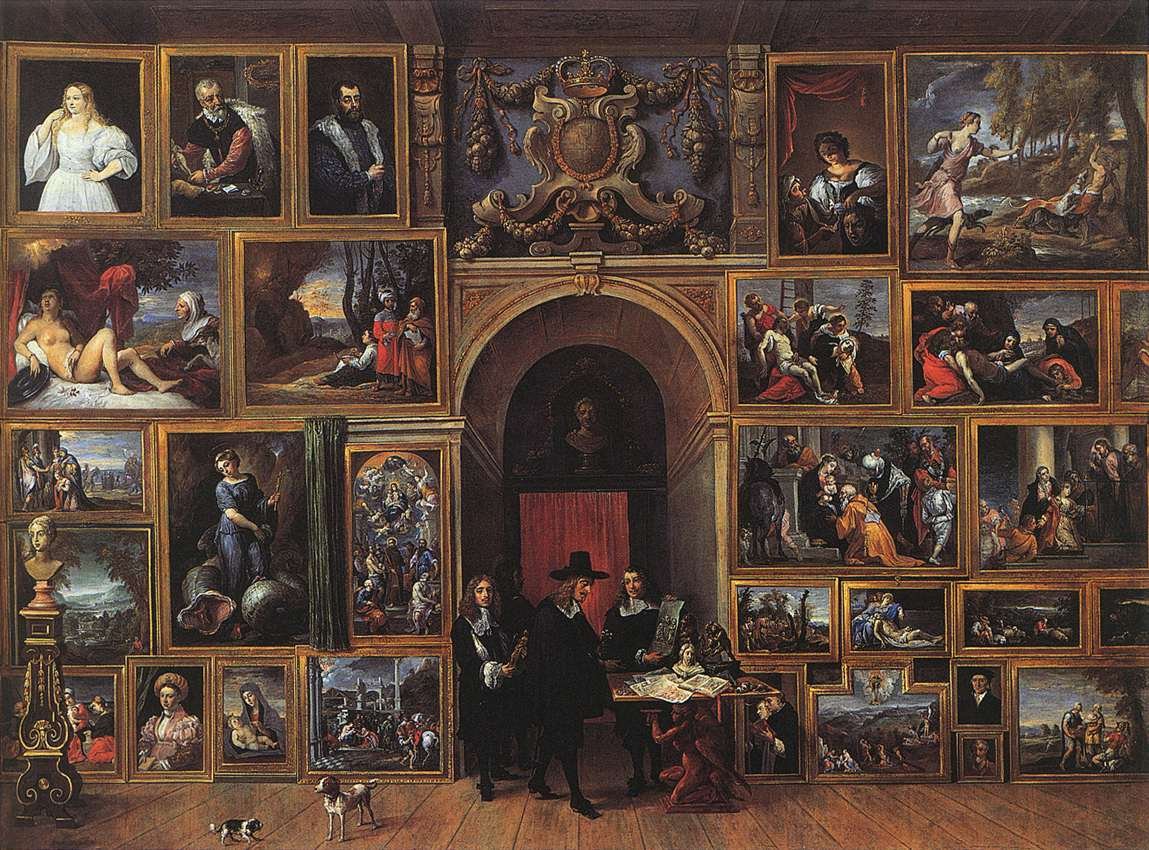
Gallery of Archduke Leopold Wilhelm (Brussels), 1651

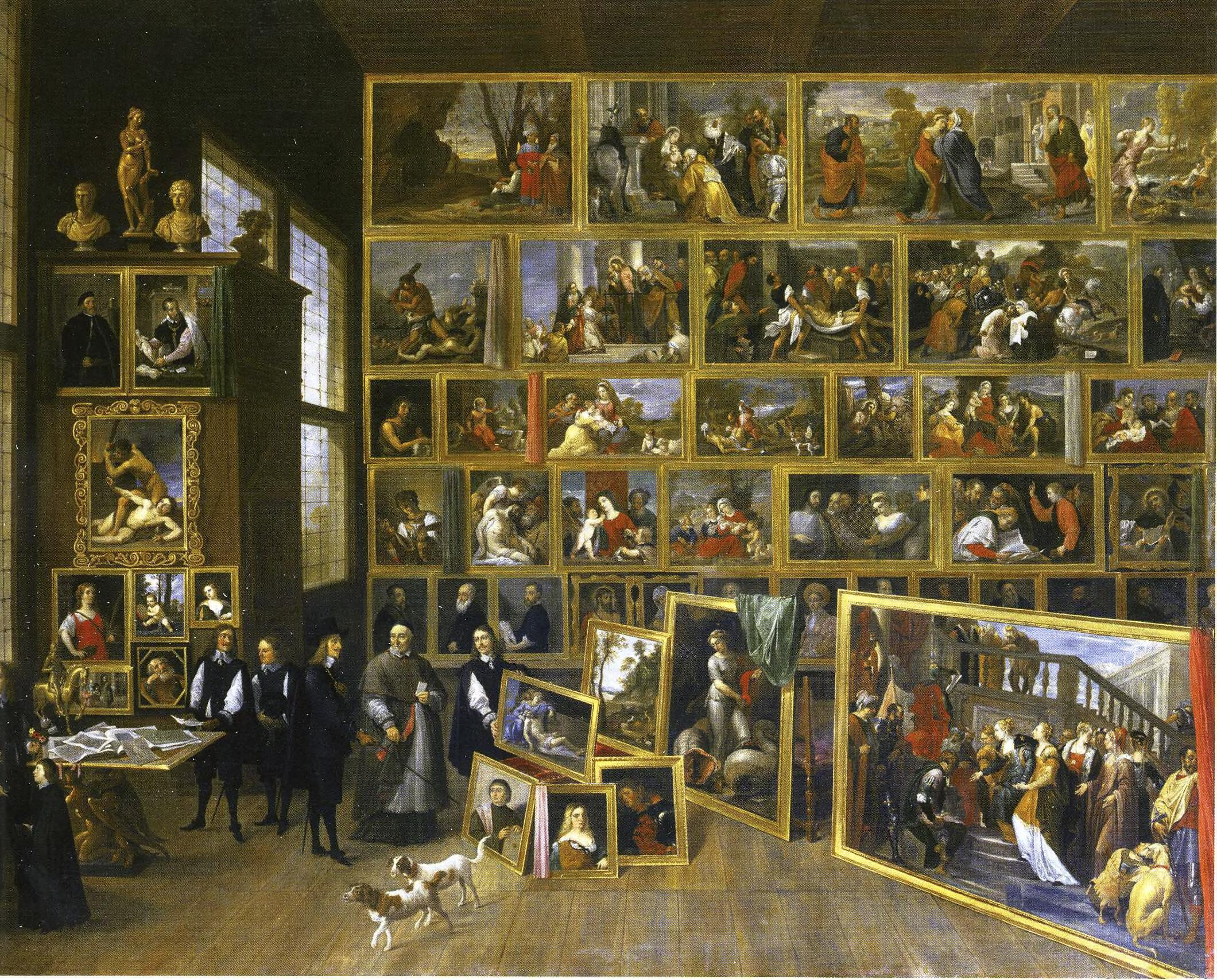
Gallery of Archduke Leopold Wilhelm in Brussels (Petworth), 1651

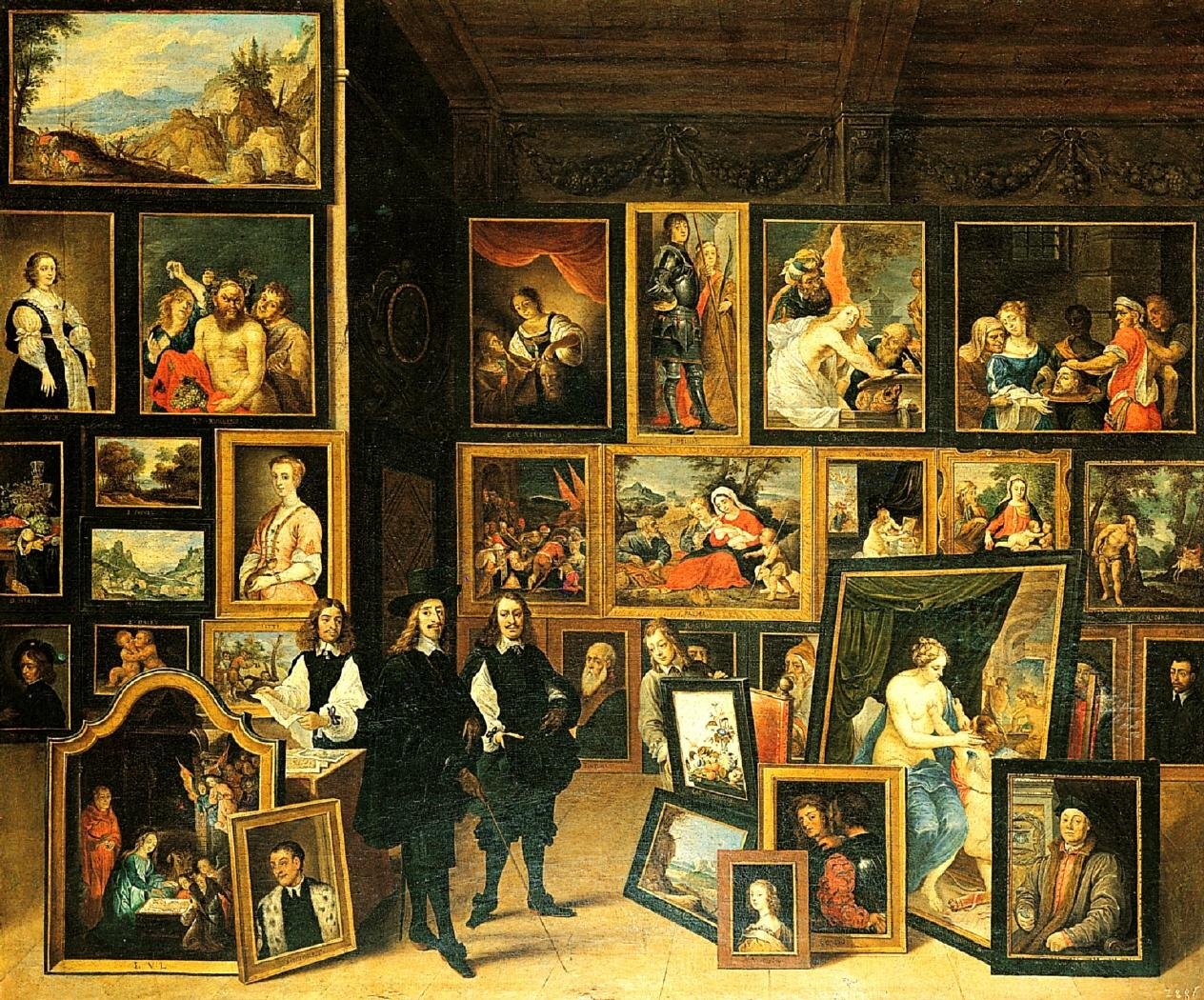
Gallery of Archduke Leopold Wilhelm in Brussels (Galdiano), 1651

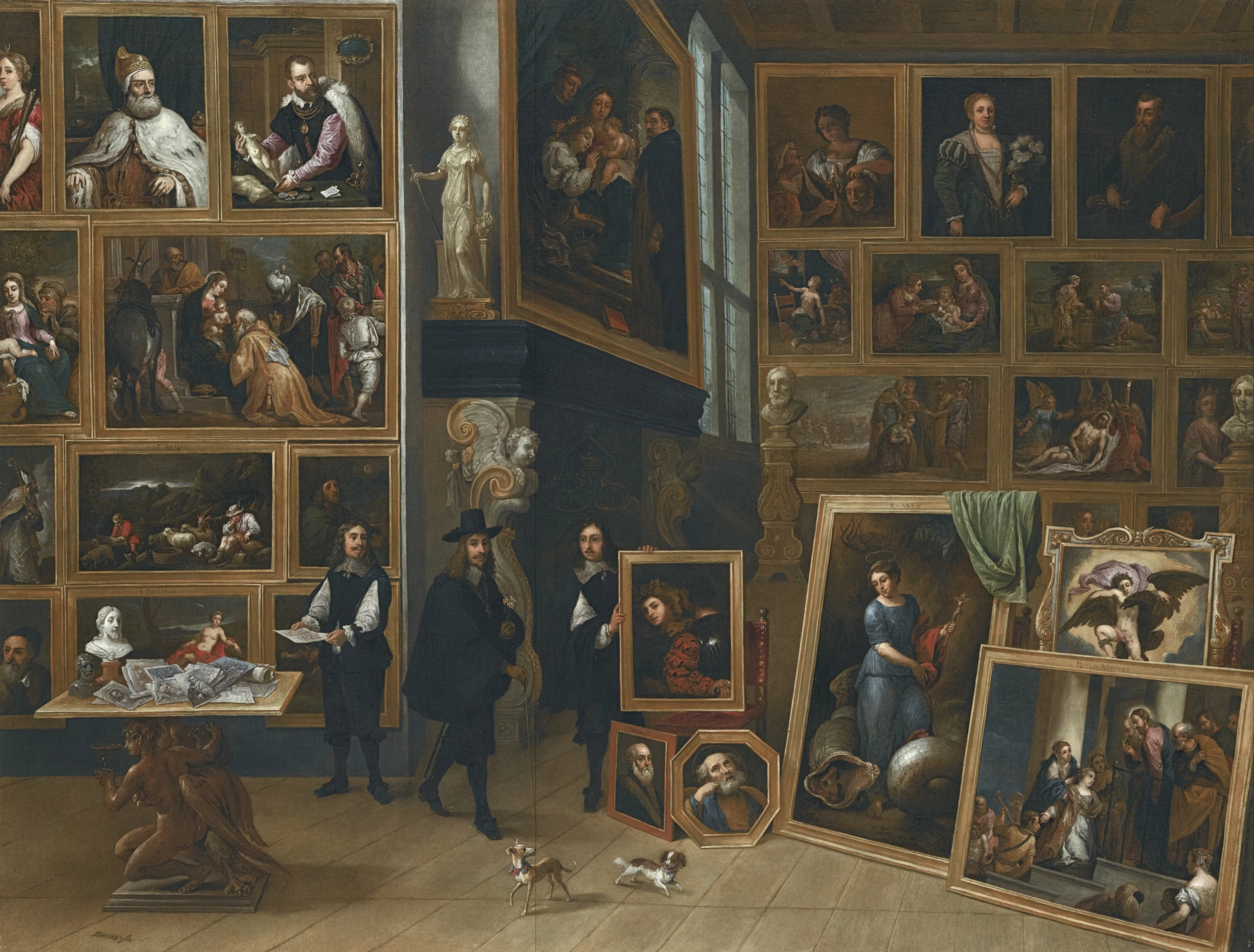
c.1651

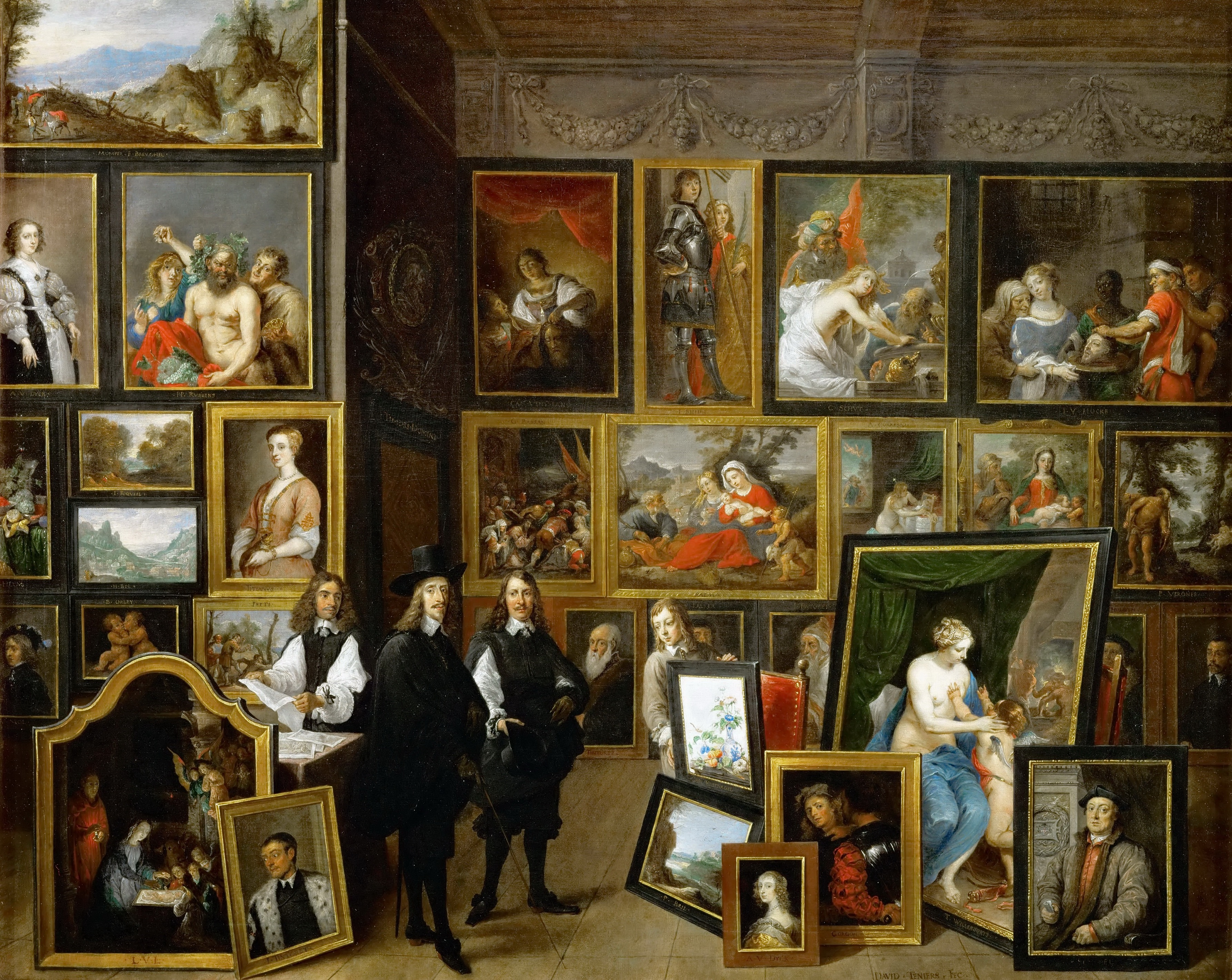
Gallery of Archduke Leopold Wilhelm in Brussels (Rothschild), 1653
