= Portrait of Jacopo Strada =

Painting by Titian

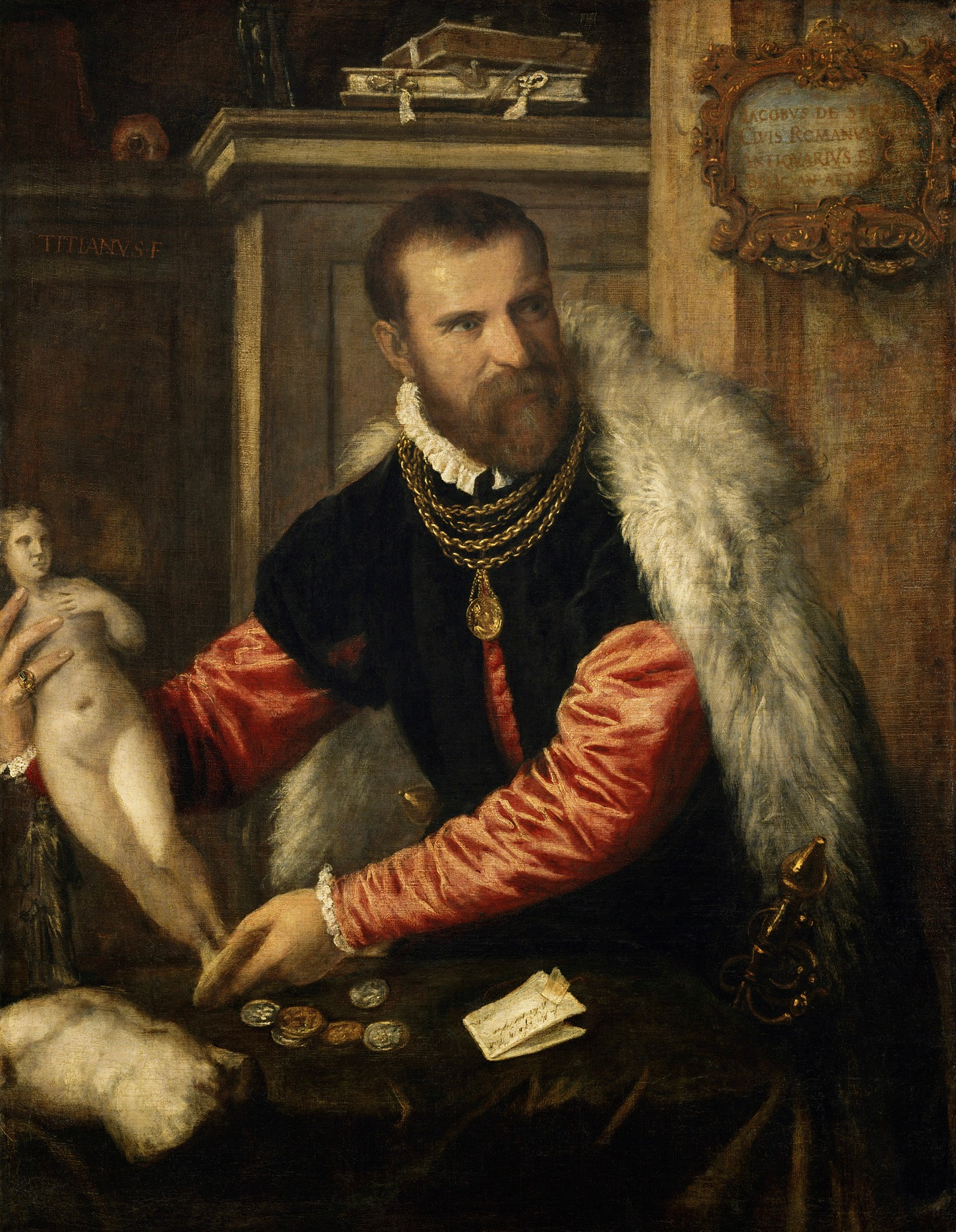
- Artist: Titian
- Year: 1567–1568
- Medium: Oil on canvas
- Dimensions: 125 cm × 95 cm (49 in × 37 in)
- Location: Kunsthistorisches Museum; Vienna

The Portrait of Jacopo Strada is an oil on canvas portrait of the court librarian Jacopo Strada by Titian, from 1567-1568. It is now in the Kunsthistorisches Museum, in Vienna.

== History ==
Strada was not only the court librarian, but active as an dealer in art and antiquites, on behalf of a succession of emperors, Albert V, Duke of Bavaria and others, and this portrait portrays him in his study surrounded by objects displaying his knowledge, and perhaps his stock. He is shown wearing a gold chain, probably awarded him the previous year (1566), when he was appointed Antiquarius Caesareus by his employer Maximilian II, Holy Roman Emperor.

The inscription upper right reads JACOBVUS DE STRADA CIVIS ROMANVS CAESS. ANTIQVARIVS ET COM. BELIC. AN: AETAT: LI: et C.M.D.L. XVI (Jacopo de Strada, citizen of Rome, imperial Antiquary and Minister, aged 51 in the year 1566). The painting is signed top left: "TITIANVS F (ECIT)". The letter on the table additionally contains the words Titian Vecellio Venezia.

== Description ==
Jacopo Strada, who commissioned the work, is portrayed at the age of 51. He posed for it in Venice, as by this date Titian no longer travelled. The portrayal has been recognised as rather critical of its subject. The portrait was part of a complicated deal between Titian and Strada for repetitions of Titian paintings, and there is evidence that Titian had a low opinion of Strada, who is shown as greedy (literally "grasping") and unscrupulous.

Quite unusually for this type of portrait at the time is the fact that the sitter does not look directly at the viewer, but is depicted while doing his work. Strada's attitude seems to express that he is communicating with a person at his side, out of frame, to whom he is presenting a statuette depicting the goddess Venus. Several coins are scattered on the table, indicating Strada's numismatic interest.

To give a little dynamism to the composition and to emphasize the movement of the sitter, the artist lets Strada's opulent fur cape slide over his right shoulder so it is only supported by his left shoulder. This fur, the shiny red silk doublet with the black velvet waistcoat over it, documents the sitter's prosperity. The gold chain wound in four turns around the neck bears a pendant where a helmeted head can be seen in profile. The chain and sword identify the model as a nobleman. The cartouche mounted on a pillar at the top right bears an inscription. The pillar itself is structurally incomprehensible and probably serves the sole purpose of carrying the cartouche.

A century later this painting was documented in David Teniers the Younger's catalog Theatrum Pictorium of the art collection of Archduke Leopold Wilhelm in 1659 and again in 1673, but the portrait had already enjoyed notoriety in Teniers' portrayals of the Archduke's art collection:

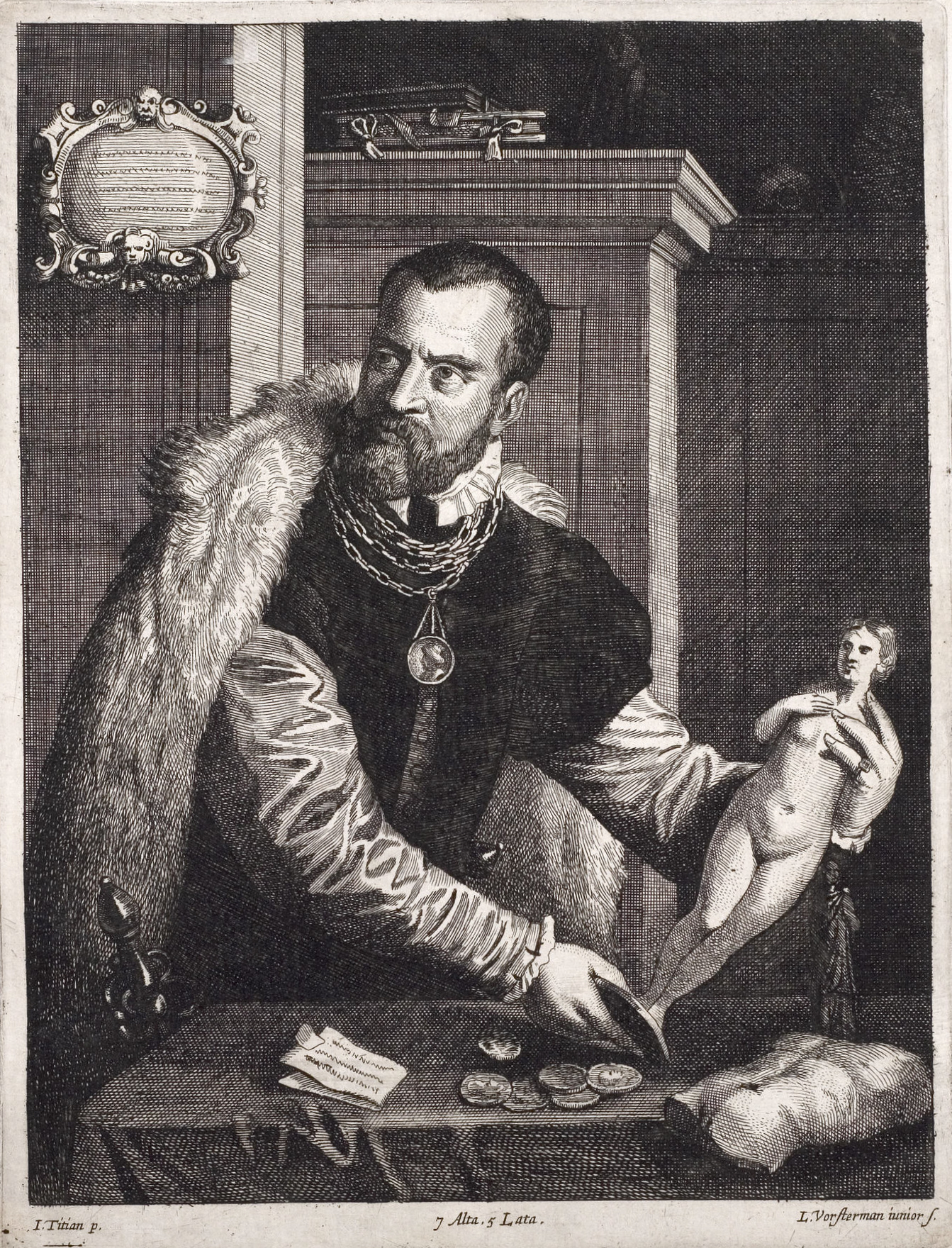
1673 engraving from Teniers' catalog, by Lucas Vorsterman II

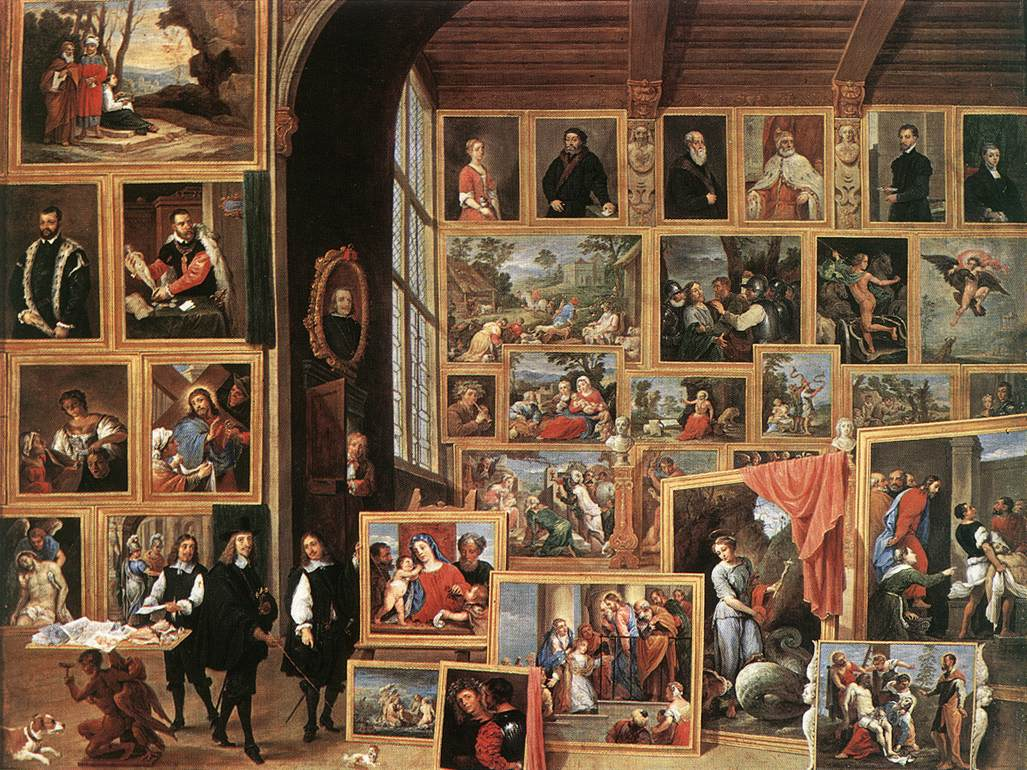
1640

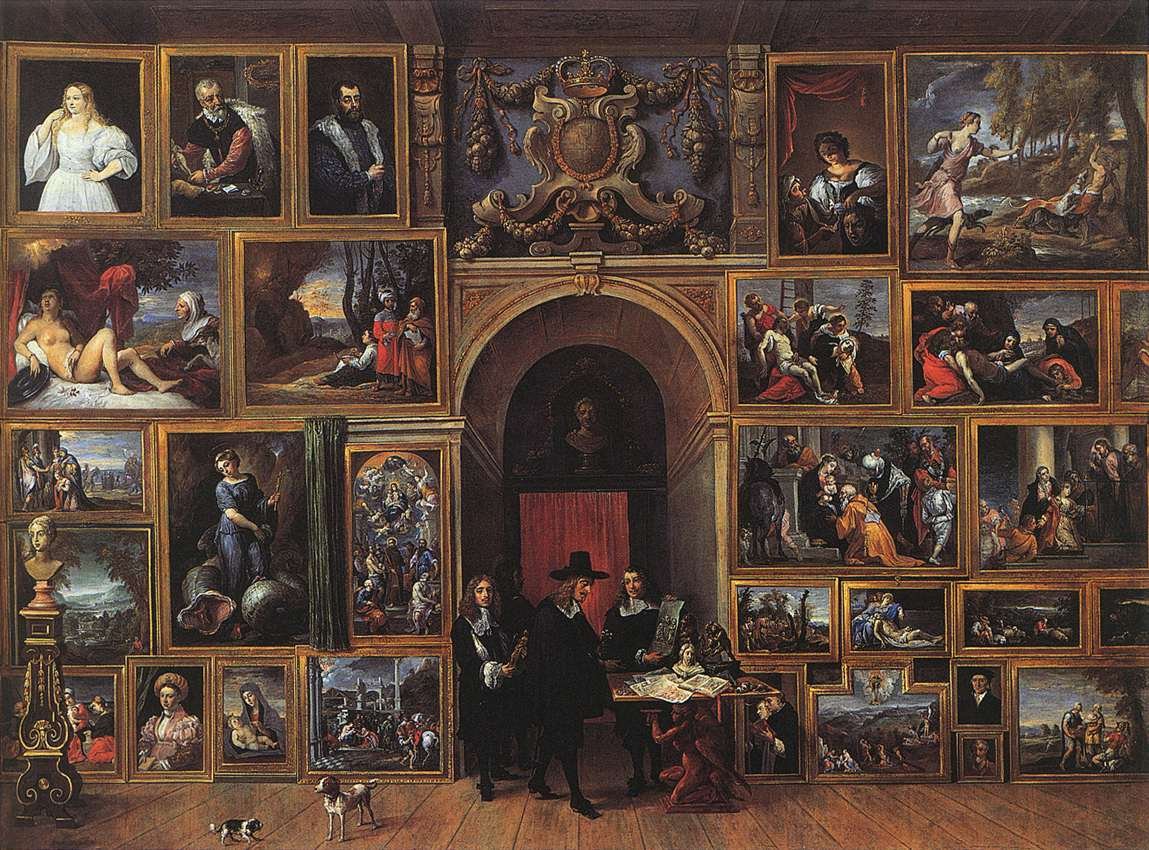
Gallery of Archduke Leopold Wilhelm (Brussels), 1651

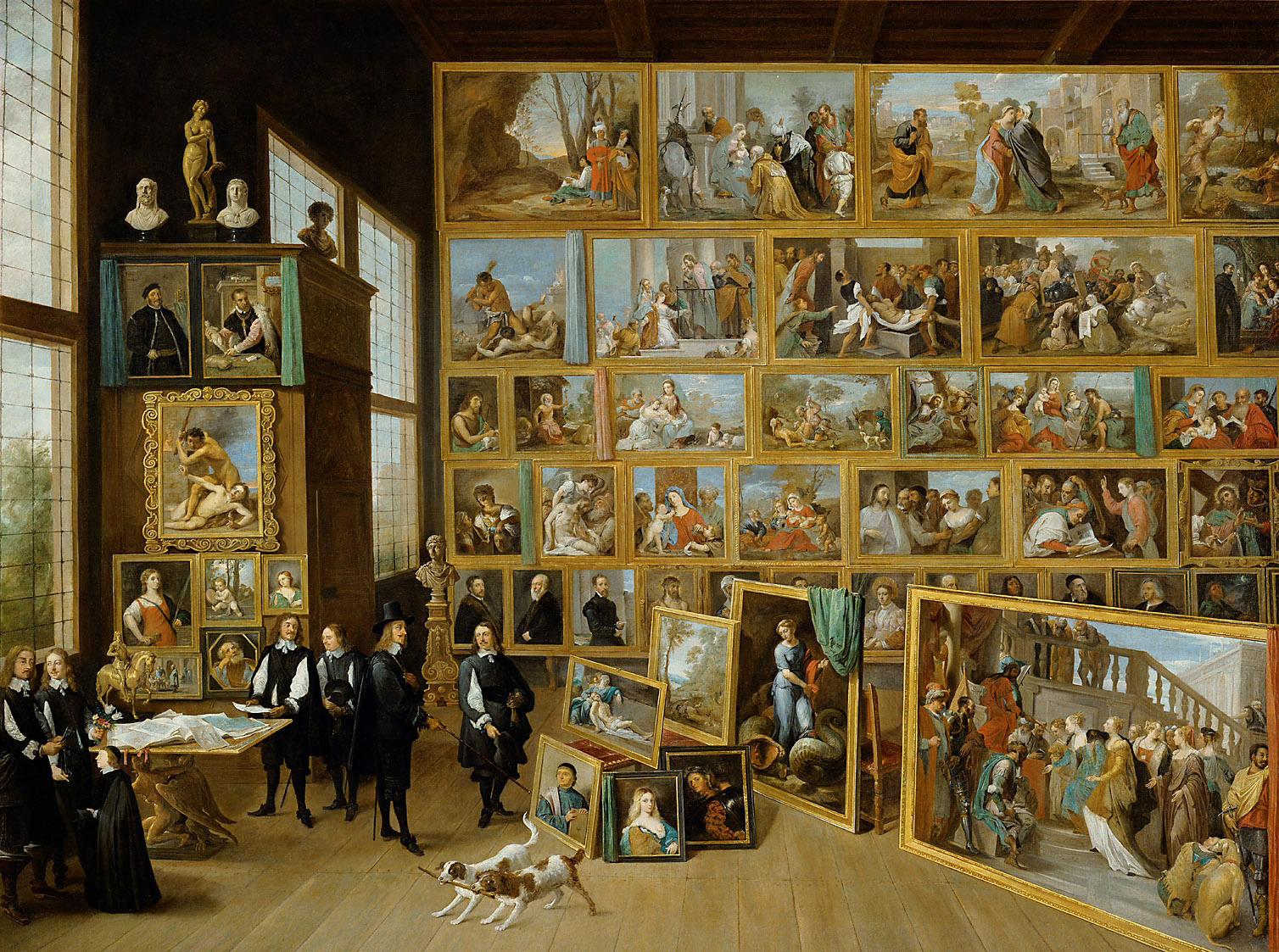
Gallery of Archduke Leopold Wilhelm in Brussels (Vienna), 1651

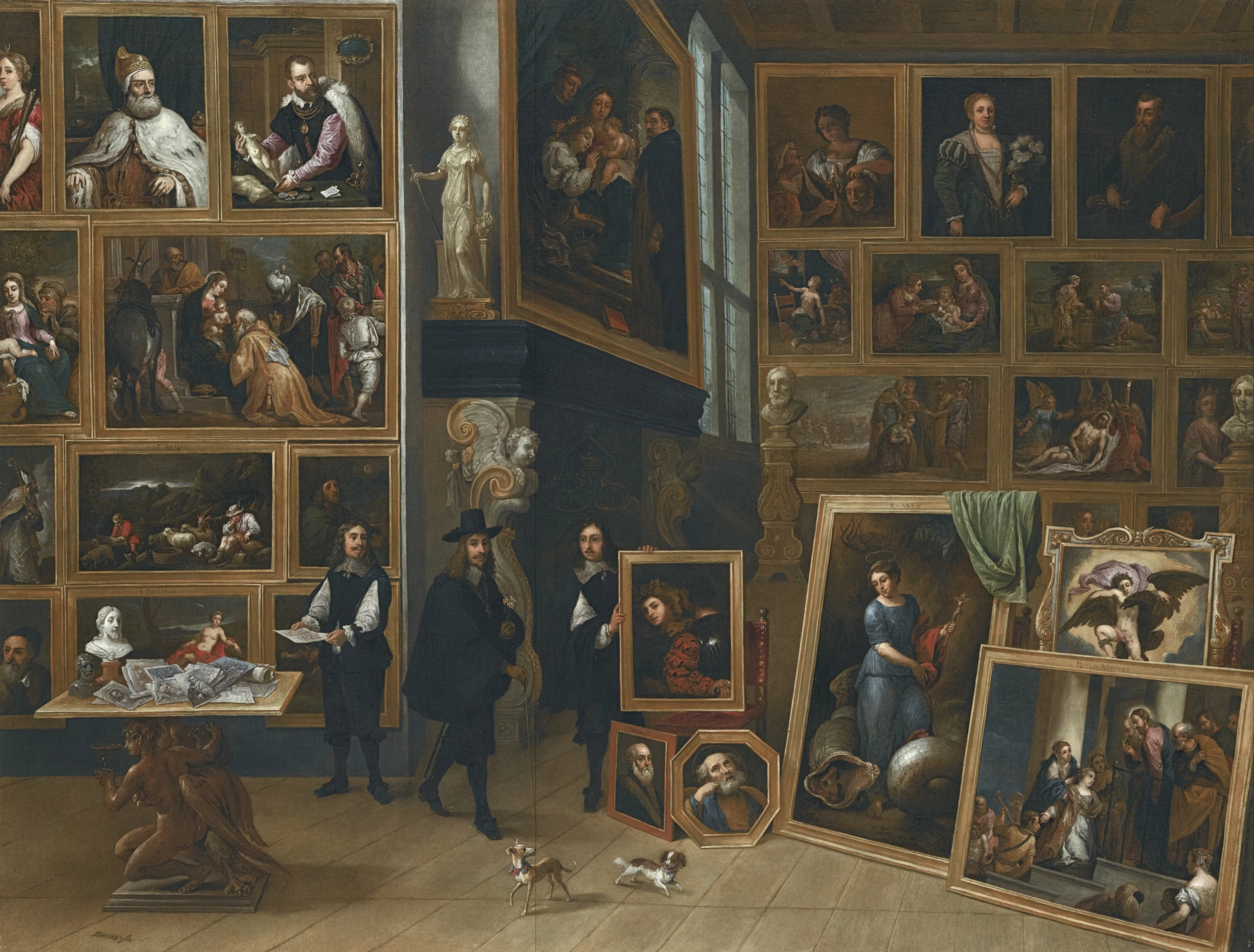
1651
