= Portrait of Cecilia Gozzadini =

Painting by Parmigianino

Portrait of a Young Woman
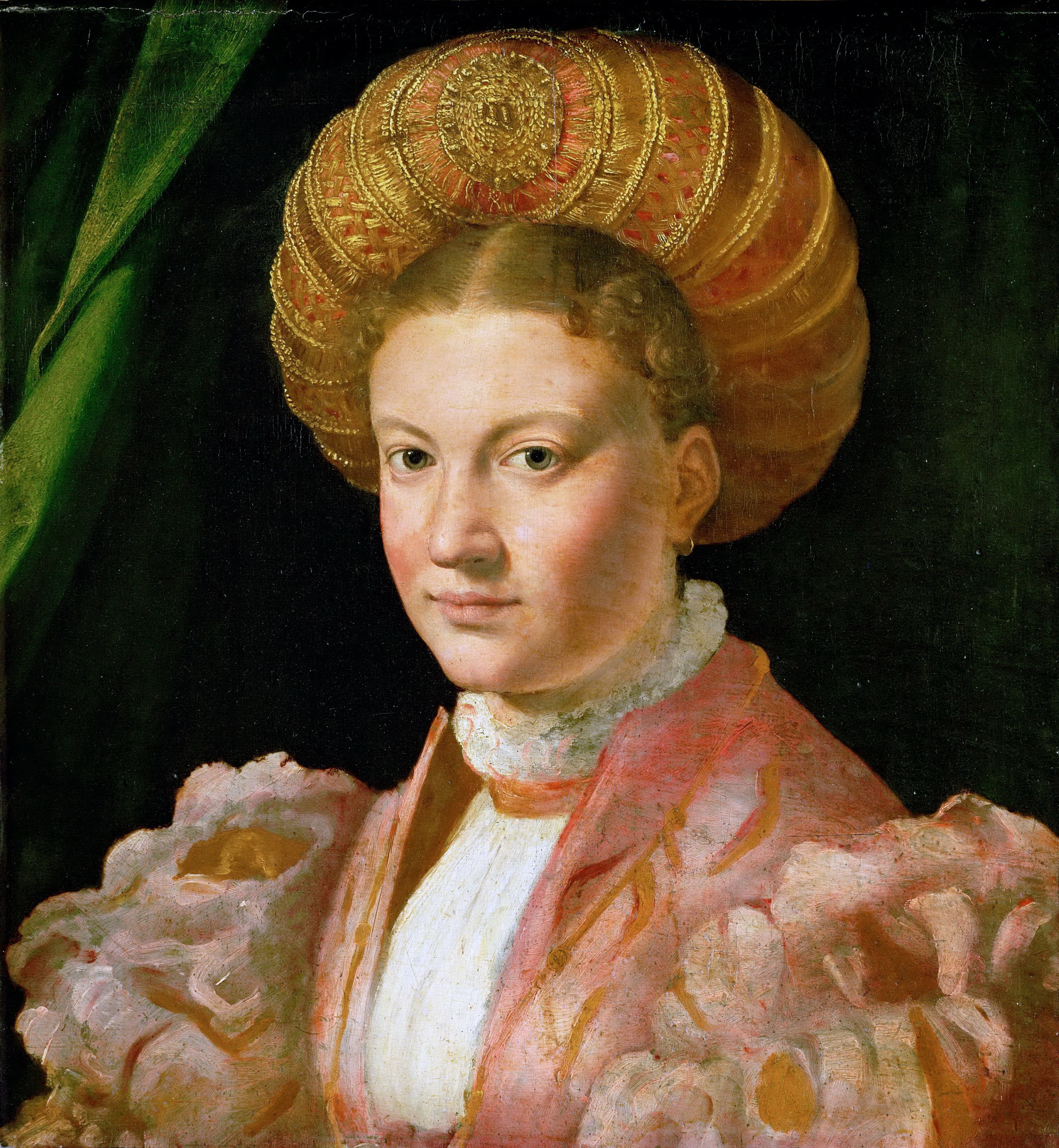
- Year: c. 1530
- Dimensions: 50 cm (20 in) × 46.5 cm (18.3 in)
- Accession no.: GG_327

Portrait of Cecilia Gozzadini is an oil painting attributed to Parmigianino, dated to around 1530 and now held at the Kunsthistorisches Museum in Vienna.

== Description ==
Against a dark background a young woman gazes at the viewer, dressed in a pink dress with slashed sleeves, after the fashion of the time. It is open at the front to shows a modest white undershirt called a guimp, held together at the neck with a ribbon in the same color of the dress. On her head she is wearing a donut-shaped turban called a balzo with gold embroidery, after a fashion then popular in Italy of the 1530s that is similar to his Turkish Slave, or Titian's Portrait of Isabella d'Este created between 1534 and 1536.

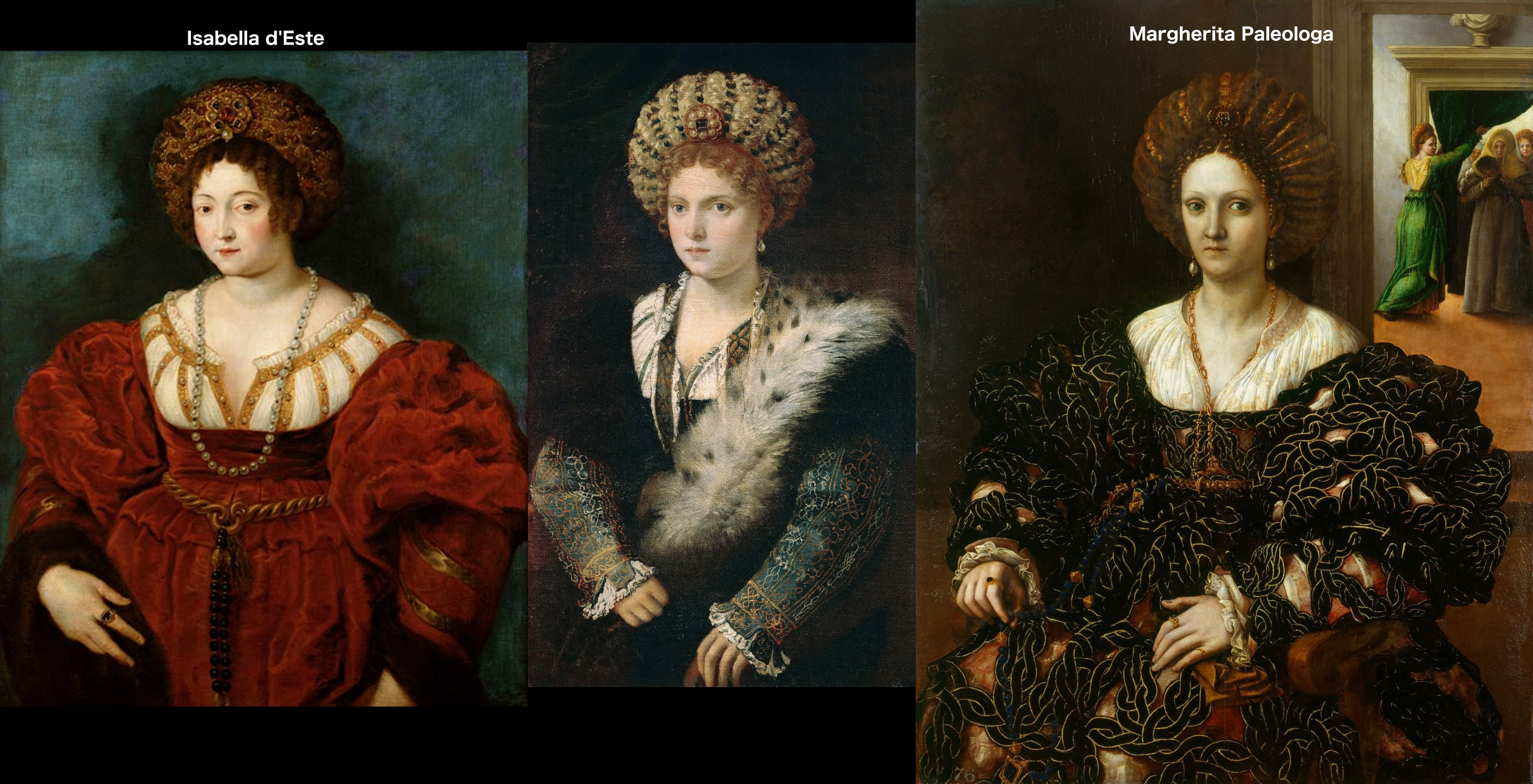
Three examples of women wearing a balzo and guimp, though these women are wearing their guimps open

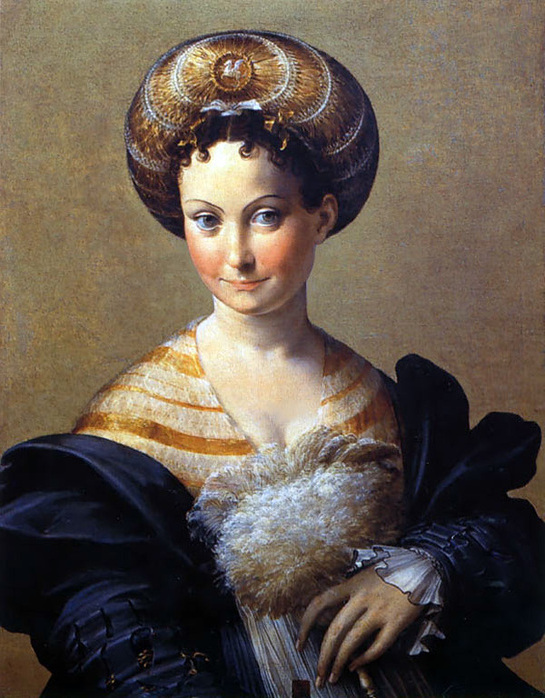
Turkish Slave

== History ==
The work was part of the collection of James Hamilton, 1st Duke of Hamilton, who brought it to London. In 1659, it was acquired by Archduke Leopold Wilhelm of Austria, whose collection later became part of the current museum. At some point after the 1660s it was severely cropped, but has been documented in its original state showing more of the green curtain at the left and hands holding a book.

The painting must have been a popular painting when it was in the Archduke's cabinet, as it was portrayed in his gallery paintings.

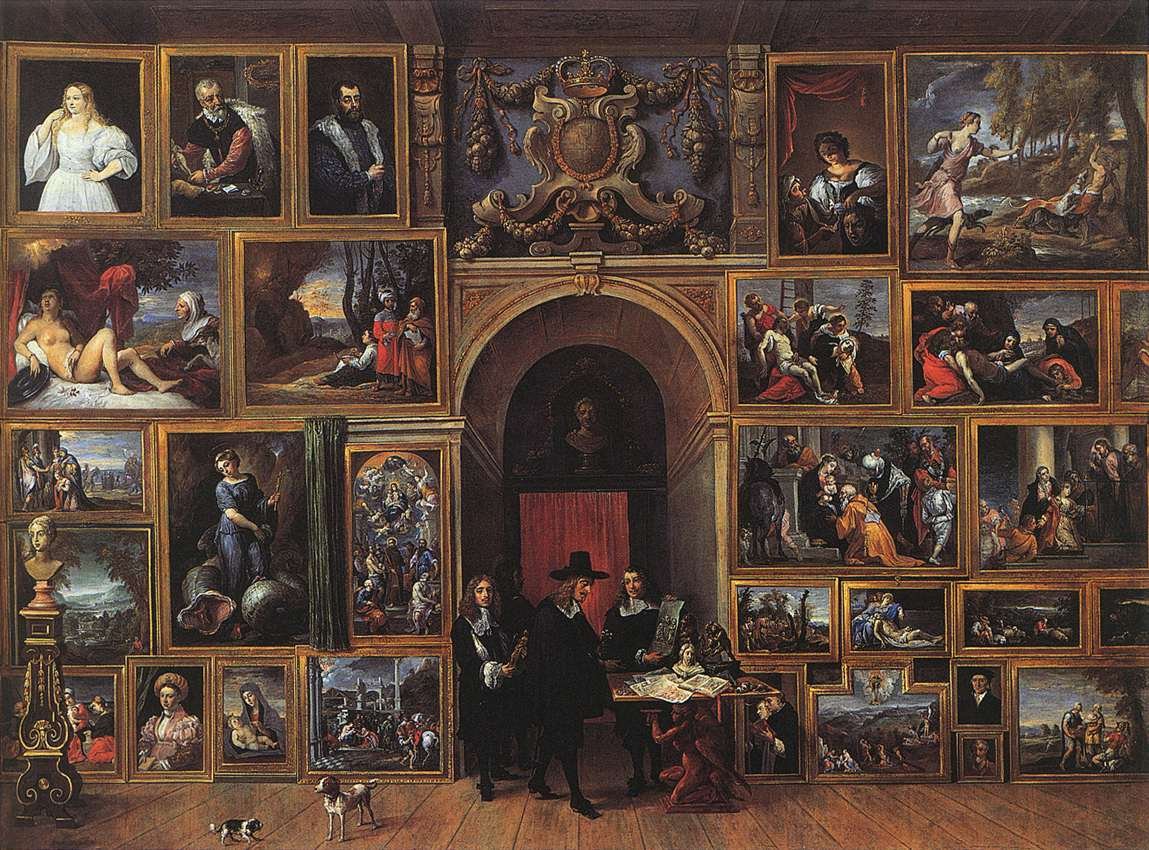
Gallery of Archduke Leopold Wilhelm (Brussels), (Royal Museums of Fine Arts of Belgium)

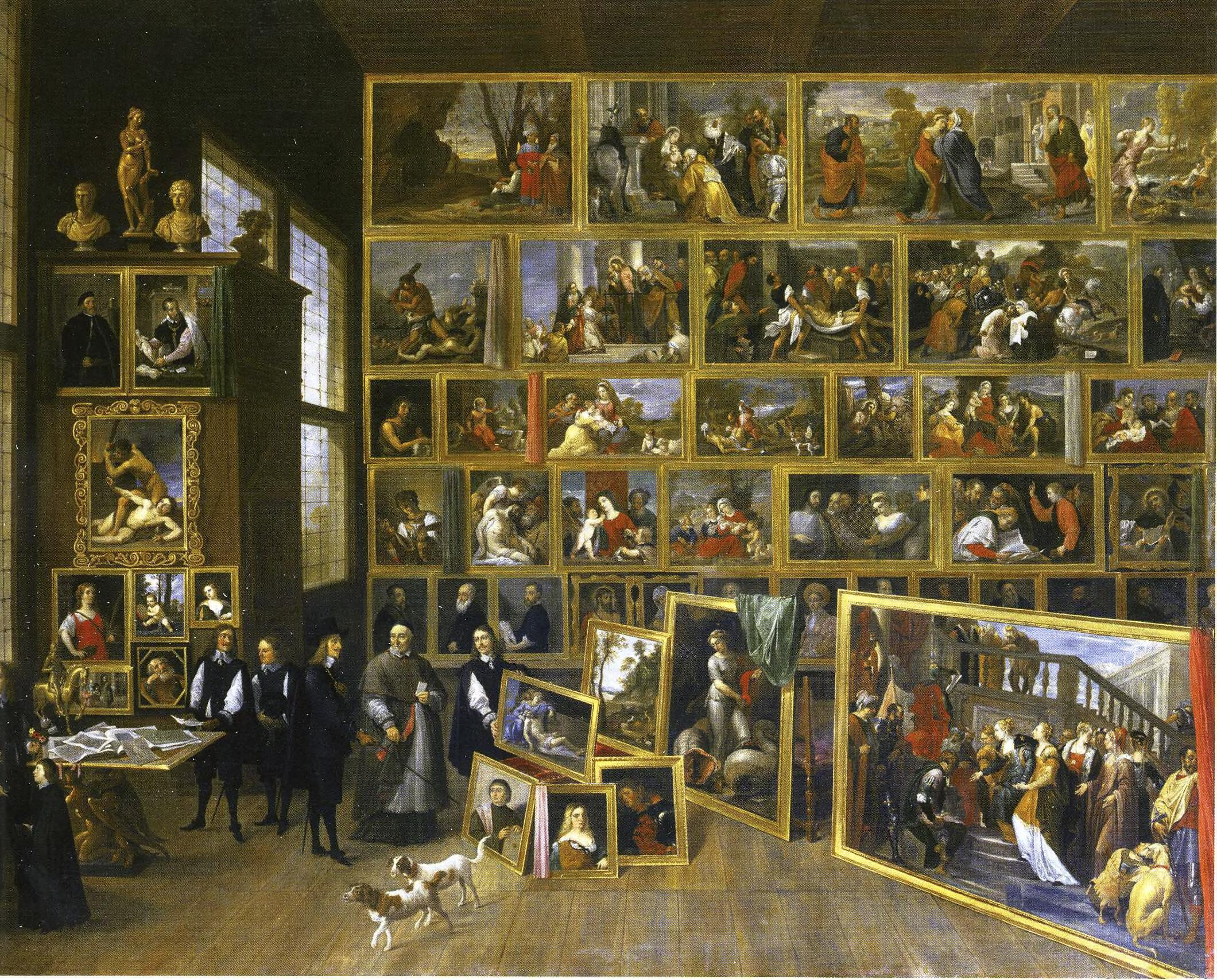
Gallery of Archduke Leopold Wilhelm in Brussels (Petworth) (Petworth House)

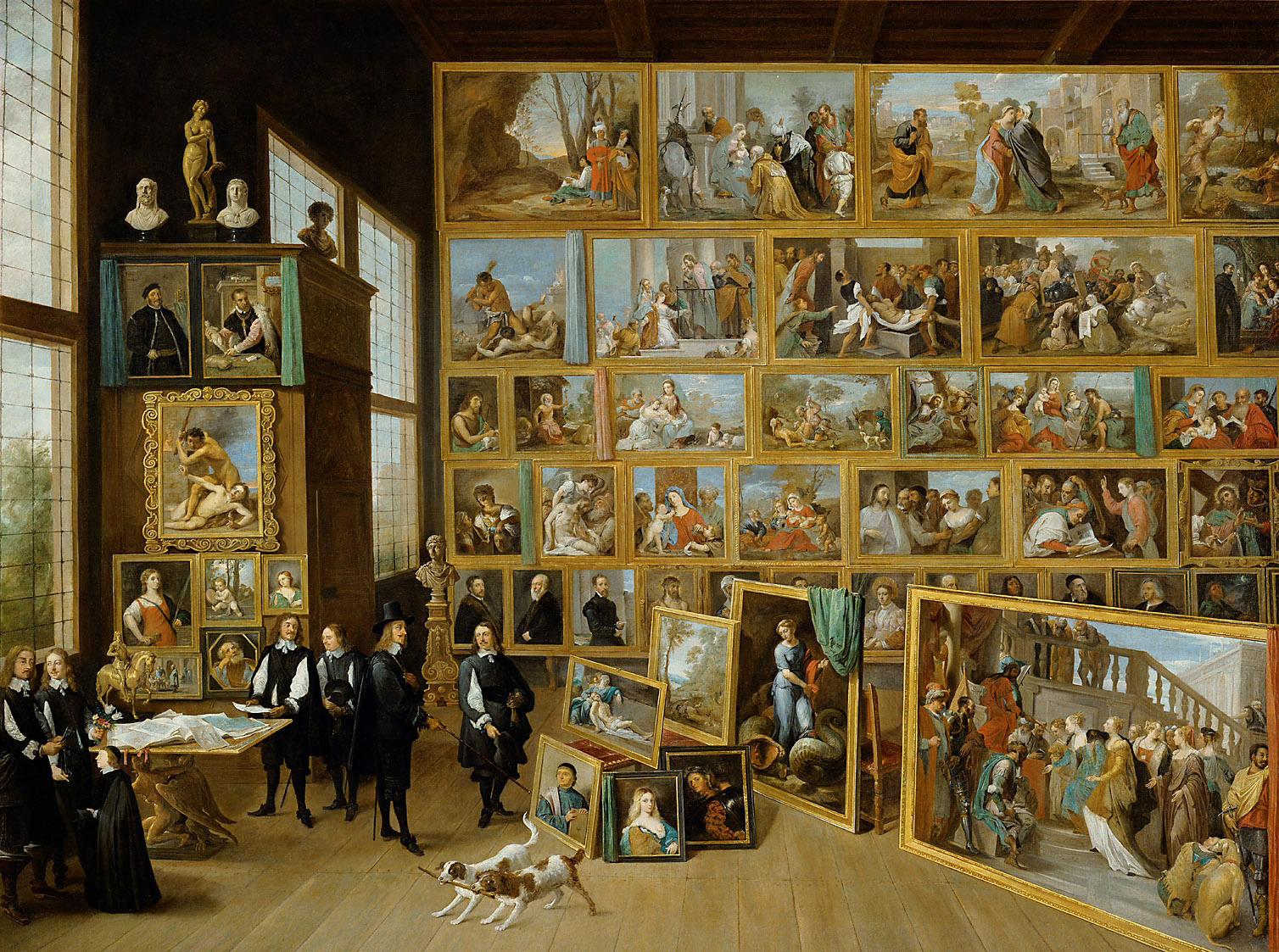
Gallery of Archduke Leopold Wilhelm in Brussels (Vienna) (Kunsthistorisches Museum)

The woman has been identified as Cecilia Gozzadini by the museum.
