= Madonna of the Cherries =

1515 painting by Titian

The Madonna of the Cherries
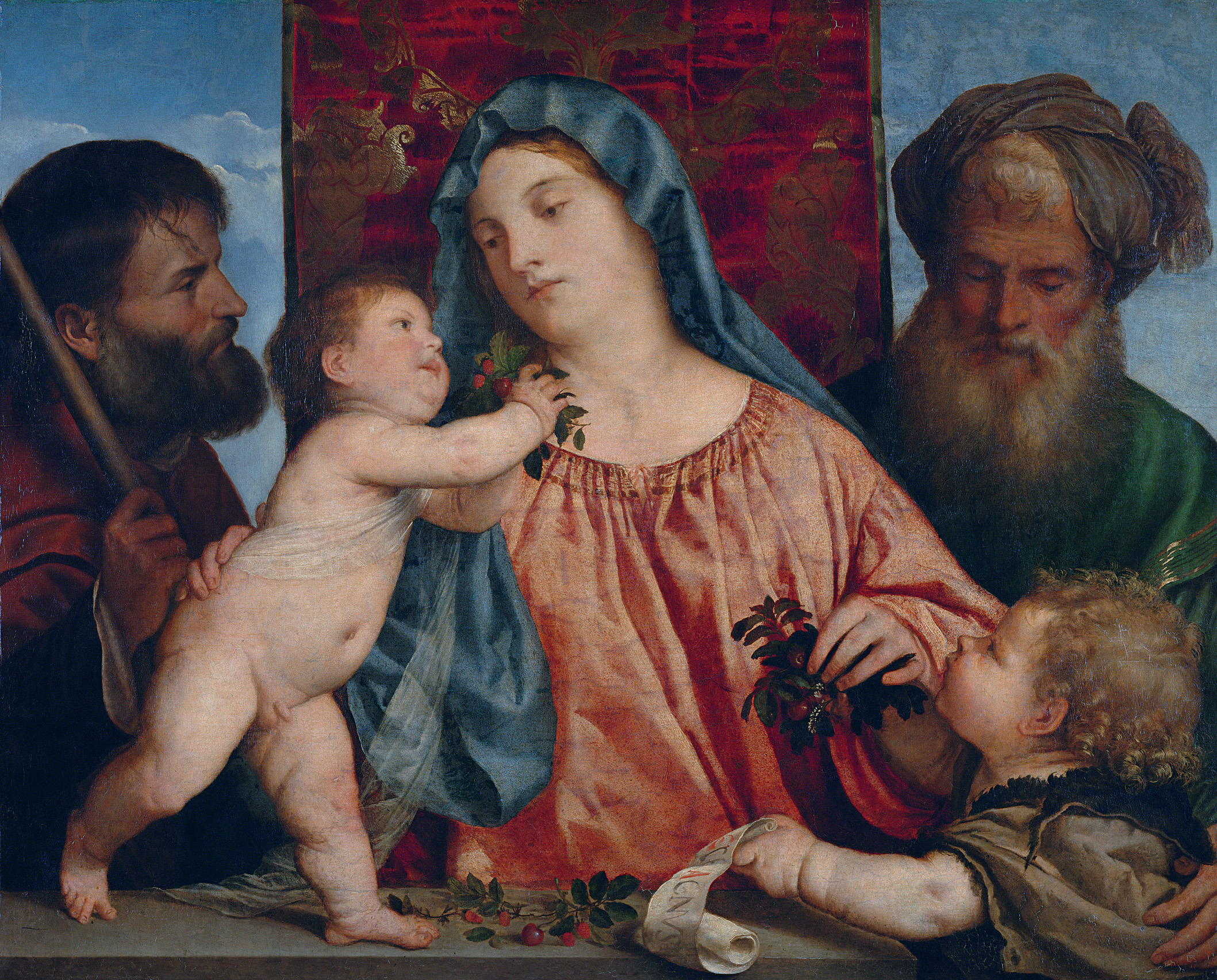
- Artist: Titian
- Year: 1515
- Medium: oil on canvas
- Dimensions: 81.6 cm × 100.2 cm (32.1 in × 39.4 in)
- Location: Kunsthistorisches Museum; Vienna

The Madonna of the Cherries is a 1515 painting by Titian, heavily influenced by the work of Giovanni Bellini. Originally oil on wood, it was later transferred to canvas. During the 17th century it formed part of the collection of Archduke Leopold Wilhelm, where it was copied by David Teniers. It is now in the Kunsthistorisches Museum, in Vienna.

== Description ==
A red curtain, damasked with gold, forms the backdrop to the half-figures of the Madonna and Child, who are depicted among two saints. Jesus wriggles on a parapet offering cherries to his mother, a reference to the doctrine of the Original sin and to the red color of the blood of the Passion of Christ, while, on the right side, Saint John the Baptist leans out. Saints Saint Joseph and Zechariah close the sides.

The work is particularly closely related to Bellini's iconic Madonna and Child (with parallel figures in the foreground and a curtain hanging behind the Virgin Mary ), but the figures have a greater sense of freedom of movement and realism, and they are in a lively and intimate communication with each other.

As in The Gypsy Madonna (Kunsthistorisches Museum), the Virgin Mary and the infant Jesus Christ are placed in a triangular composition with the infant John the Baptist between the balustrade in the foreground and the cloth behind. The triangle symbolizes eternity, legitimacy and harmony. The Virgin and Child are contrasted by the saints standing vertically on either side of them (Saint Joseph on the right and St. Zacharias, father of John, on the left). Moreover, the Virgin and Child are idealized, while the saints are realistic.

The infant John offering a cherry, a symbol of virginity, is holding a scroll with the inscription "ECCE AGNVS DEI." This is similar to the infant John holding a lily of the valley in Albrecht Dürer's Madonna del Lucherino (Berlin Gesellschaft), executed in Venice, in 1506. This is a traditional composition in the Venetian style, referable to Giovanni Bellini, but also to the mentioned work of Dürer, also seen in the unusually detailed realism of Zacharias.

Titian however updated the theme with a greater sense of movement that animates the characters, who are seen sometimes facing downwards or upwards, and with the use of bright and full-bodied colors, in the name of overcoming tonality.

== Theatrum Pictorium ==
This painting was documented in David Teniers the Younger's catalog Theatrum Pictorium of the art collection of Archduke Leopold Wilhelm in 1659 and again in 1673, but the portrait had already enjoyed notoriety in Teniers' portrayals of the Archduke's art collection:

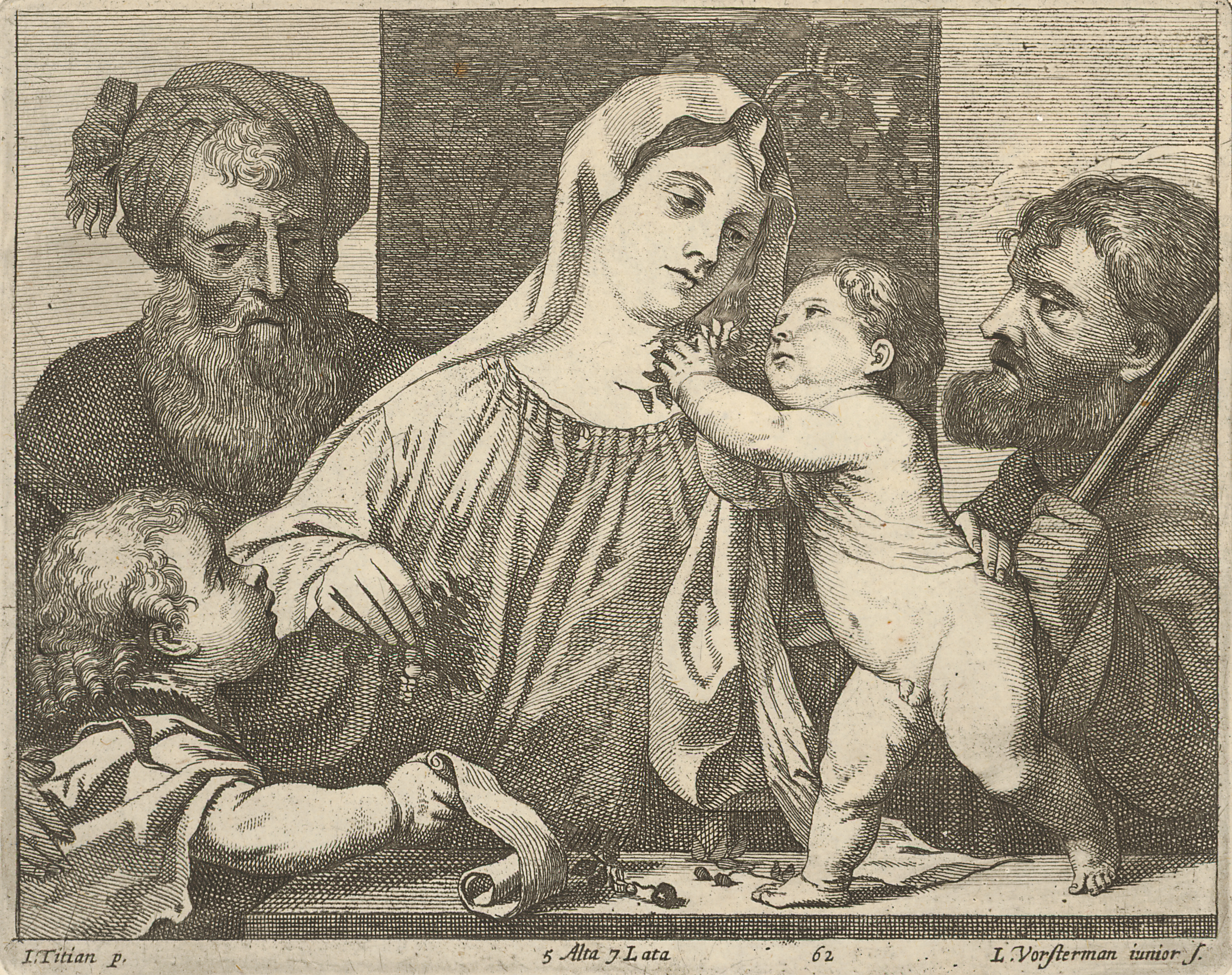
1673 engraving from Teniers' catalog, by Lucas Vorsterman

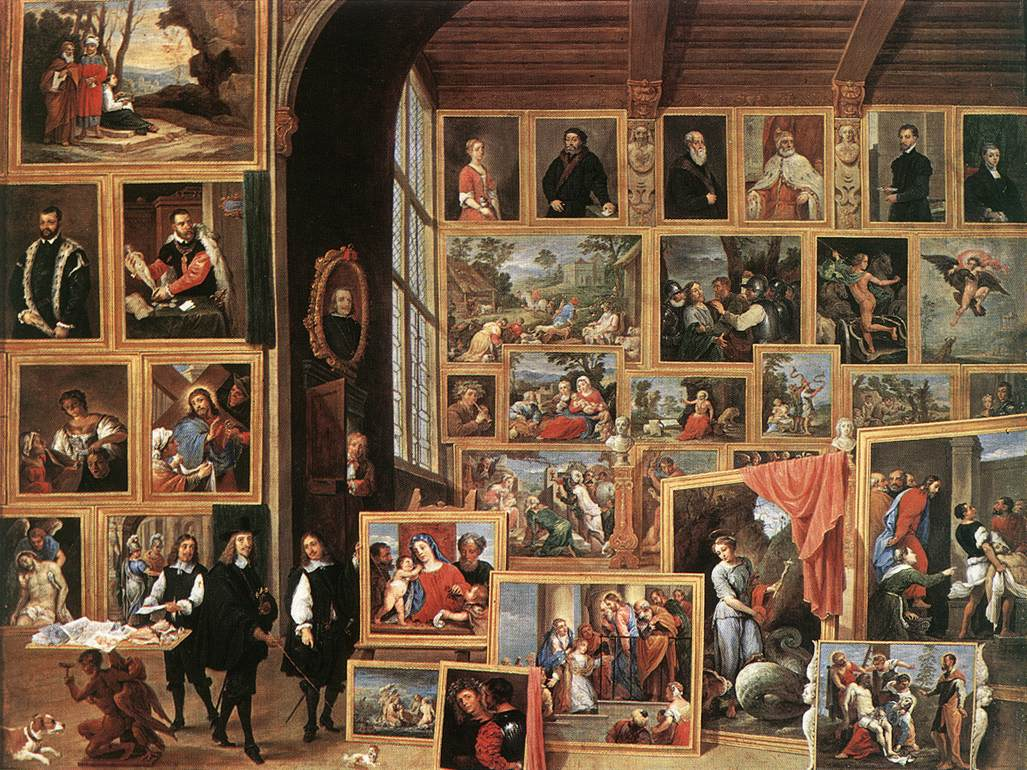
1640

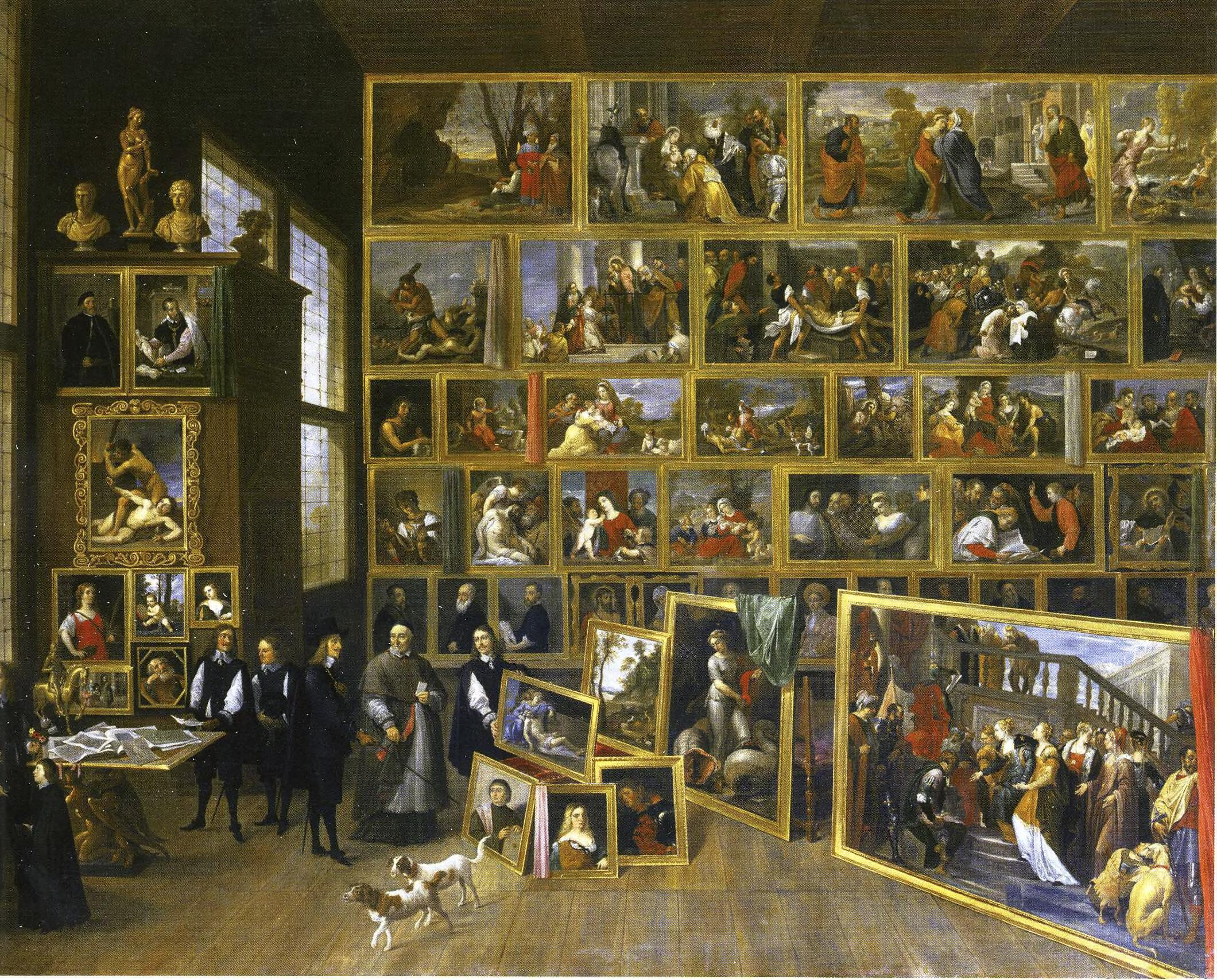
Gallery of Archduke Leopold Wilhelm in Brussels (Petworth), 1651

== See also ==
- List of works by Titian
