= Andrea Schiavone =

Italian painter (1510–1563)

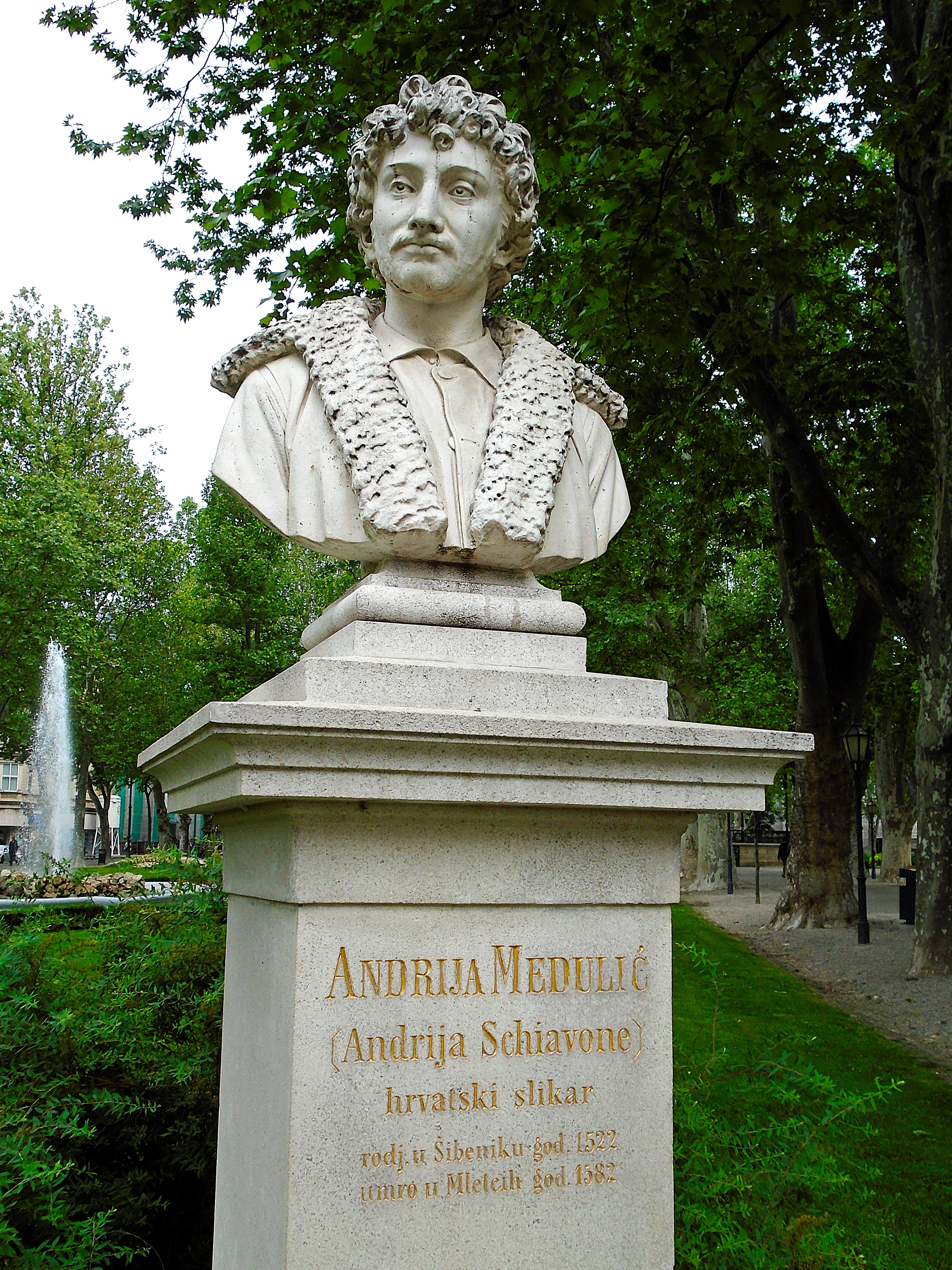
Andrija Medulić/Andrea Schiavone bust in Zagreb, Croatia

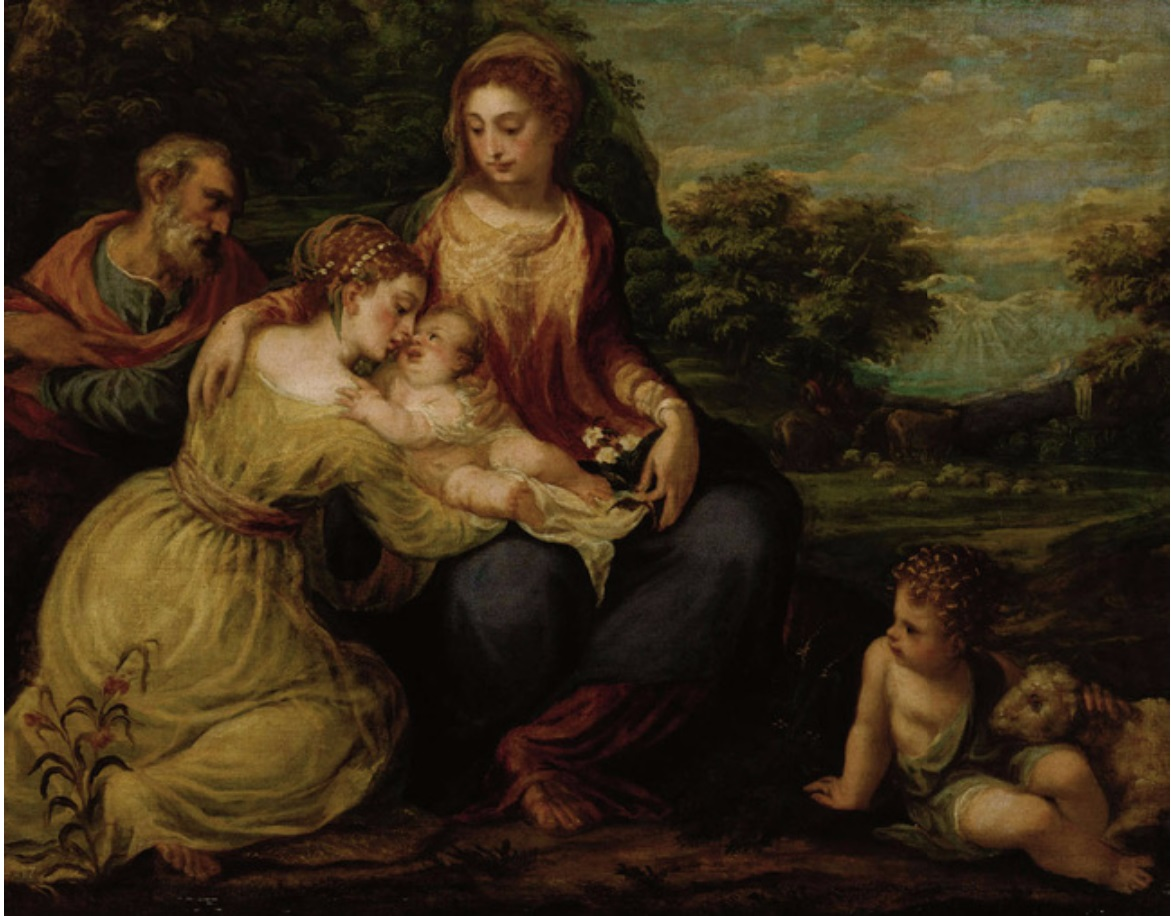
Holy Family with St Catherine, 1552, Vienna

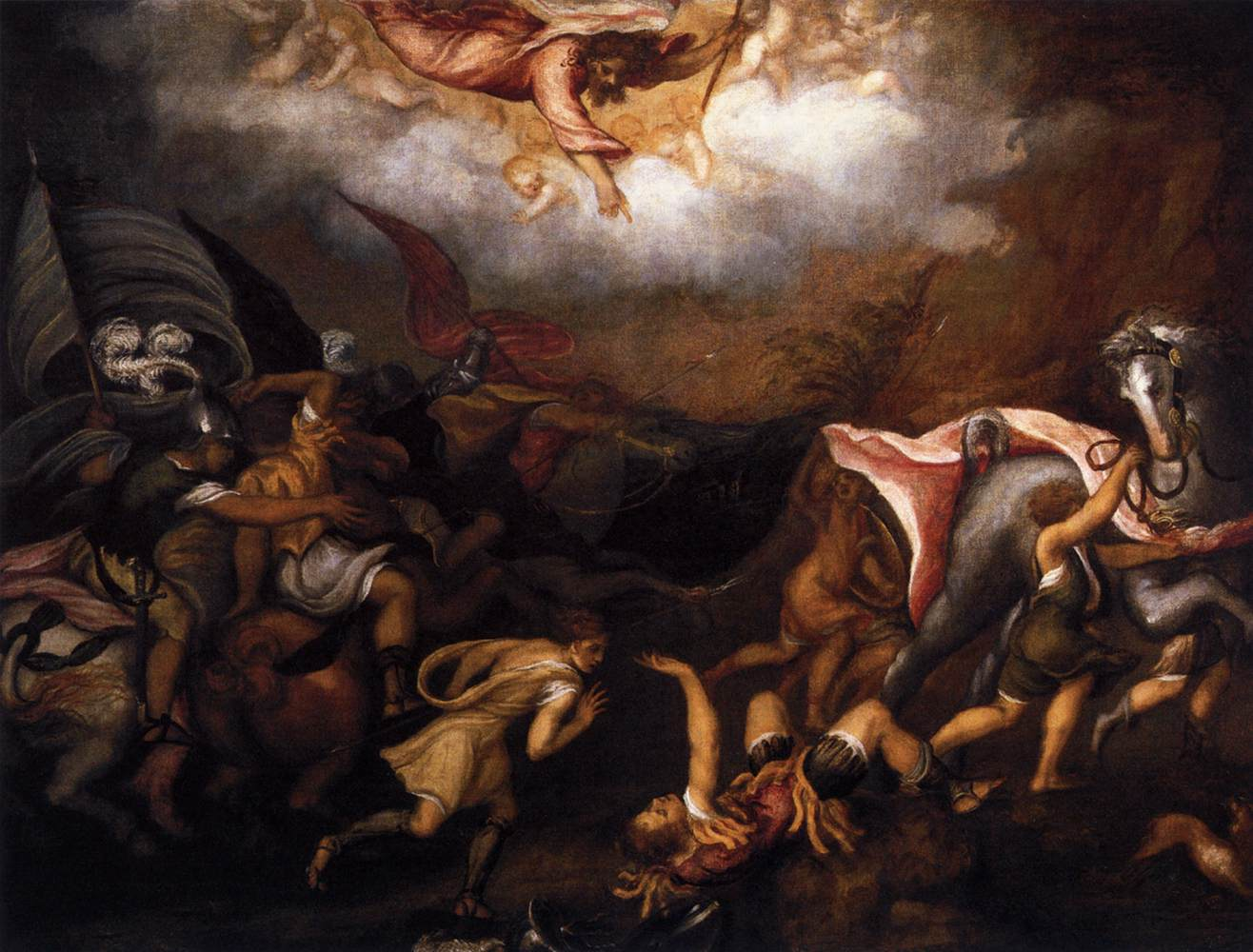
Conversion of St. Paul

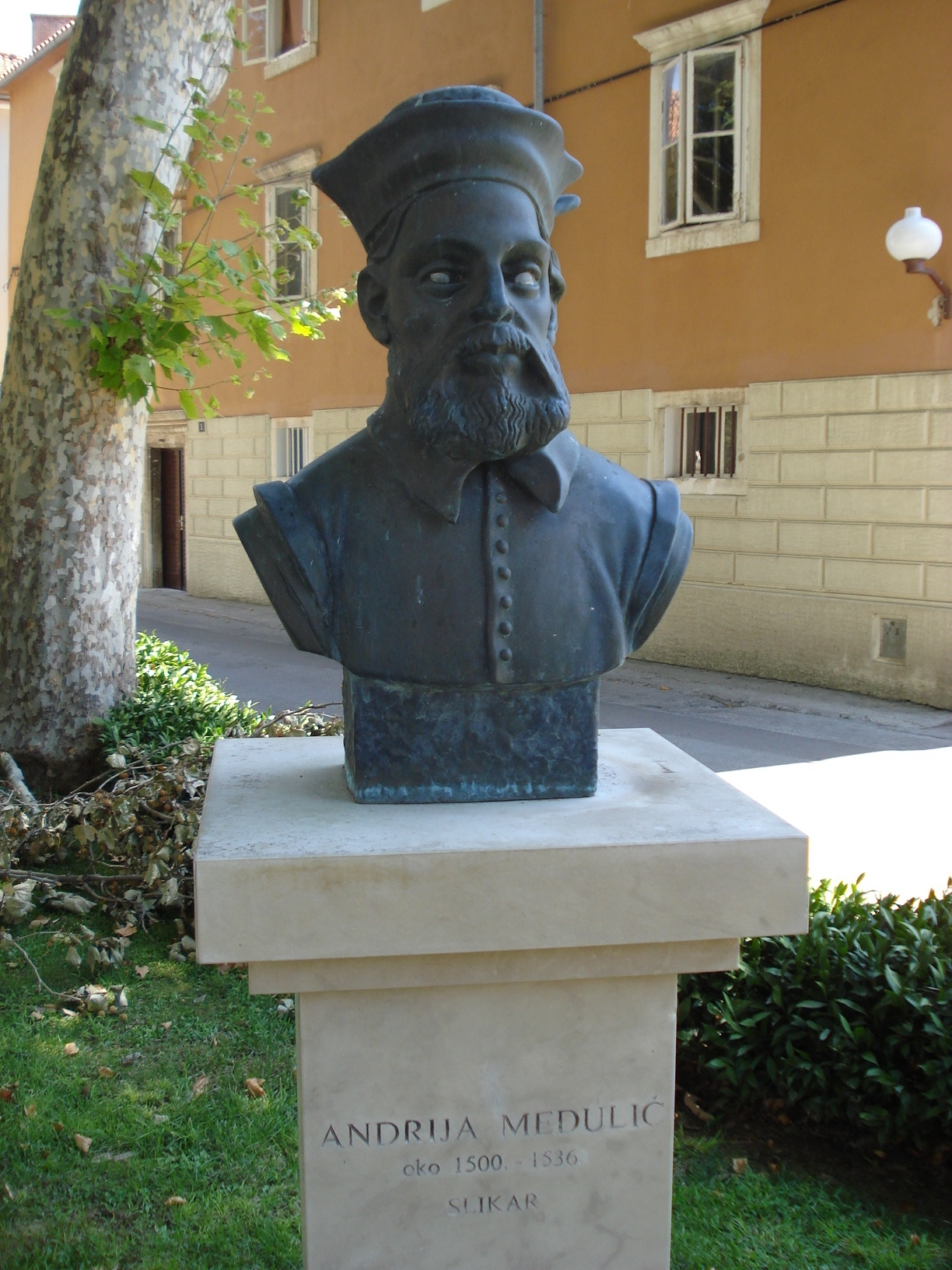
Andrija Medulić/Andrea Schiavone bust in Zadar, Croatia

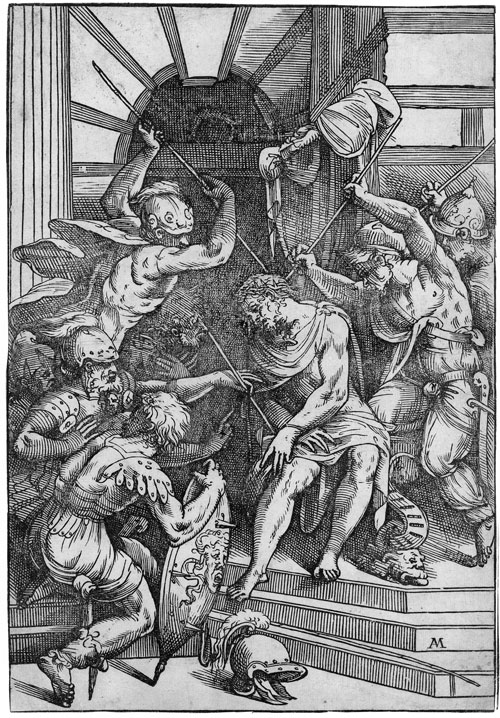
The Crowning with thorns, woodcut by Schiavone after a painting by Titian

Andrea Meldolla (Croatian: Andrija Medulić), also known as Andrea Schiavone or Andrea lo Schiavone, literally "Andrew the Slav", (c. 1510/15–1563) was an Italian Renaissance painter and etcher, born in Dalmatia, in the Republic of Venice (present-day Croatia) to parents from Romagna, active mainly in the city of Venice. His style combined Mannerist elements, a relative rarity in Venice, with much influence from the mainstream of Venetian painting, especially Titian.

== Biography ==
Meldolla was born in the Venetian-ruled city of Zara in Dalmatia, now Zadar in Croatia, (Note: Because of his birthplace, Lo Schiavone appears in Croatian literature and history of art exclusively as Andrija Medulić (derived from the Italian surname Meldola, or Meldolla, itself from the city of origin of both of his parents, Meldola), which is the Croatian version of his name. His Italian nickname, Schiavone, literally meant "Slav" in Old Italian. Schiavone usually indicated origins in parts of Croatia (Dalmatia or Istria) under the rule of the Republic of Venice; however, it was not necessarily an ethnonym, as with this word the Venetians scornfully referred to all the people born in Dalmatia and Istria arriving to Venice; i.e. including the Italians and Venetians themselves. Indeed, in the case of Andre Meldolla, the nickname Schiavone is due to his geographical provenance, and was given to him after he returned to Italy.) the son of a garrison commander of a post nearby. Both of his parents came from the small town of Meldola, close to the city of Forlì in Romagna. His father, Simon, had been employed as a constable in the Dalmatian city, and therefore moved there with his family from Romagna. The Meldolla family continued to own property in Romagna until the early 16th century.

He trained either in Zara or in Venice. Gian Paolo Lomazzo stated, in a book of 1584, that he was a pupil of Parmigianino, but this has been doubted. There are unproven claims that he trained with Bonifazio de Pitati. He worked in fresco, panel painting, and etching (teaching himself to etch by working initially from drawings by Parmigianino). By 1540, he was well enough established in Venice that Giorgio Vasari commissioned him a large battle picture (which the Florentine author mentions in his Lives). Although initially much influenced by Parmigianino and Italian Mannerism, "he was also a strikingly daring exponent of Venetian painting techniques", and ultimately combined both in his works, influencing Titian, Tintoretto, and Jacopo Bassano among others. His works "shocked some contemporaries and stimulated others". By the 1550s, he had achieved a new synthesis of Raphael and Titian's compositional elements with his own interest in atmosphere, effecting a "fusion of form with a dense atmosphere in a pictorial fabric whose elements tend to lose their separate indenties".

Sydney Joseph Freedberg describes Meldolla as well adapted to the Mannerist vocabulary, and says that while he was "able to invent a Venetian Maniera...he was strangely uncreative in the more ordinary workings of artistic invention." Later in the 1550s, "occasionally, the sensibility – too receptive, almost feminine – that inclined Schiavone towards imitation brought him to the verge of echo of the larger personality" (Titian). Other works have attributions disputed between him and Tintoretto. Few of his paintings are documented; this may be because, as Vasari states, he mostly worked for private clients.

Richardson also insists on his importance as an etcher: "In etching he was similarly innovative. His technique was unlike that of any contemporary: unsystematically he used dense webs of light, fine, multidirectional hatching to create a tonal continuum embracing form, light, shadow, and air. His etchings are the only real equivalent in printmaking of later 16th-century Venetian painting modes, and his technical experiments were emulated by 17th-century etchers such as Jacques Bellange, Giovanni Benedetto Castiglione and Rembrandt".

Meldolla died in Venice in 1563.

== Sources ==
- Freedberg, Sydney J. (1993). Pelican History of Art (ed.). Painting in Italy, 1500-1600. Penguin Books. pp. 532–534.
- Richardson, Francis E. (1980). Andrea Schiavone. Oxford and New York: Oxford University Press.
- Richardson, Francis E. the Encyclopedia of Italian Renaissance & Mannerist Art. pp. 1502–04 at 1503.
