= Gallery of Archduke Leopold Wilhelm in Brussels (Vienna) =

Painting by David Teniers the Younger

Archduke Leopold Wilhelm in his Gallery in Brussels
- The Art Collection of Archduke Leopold Wilhelm in Brussels
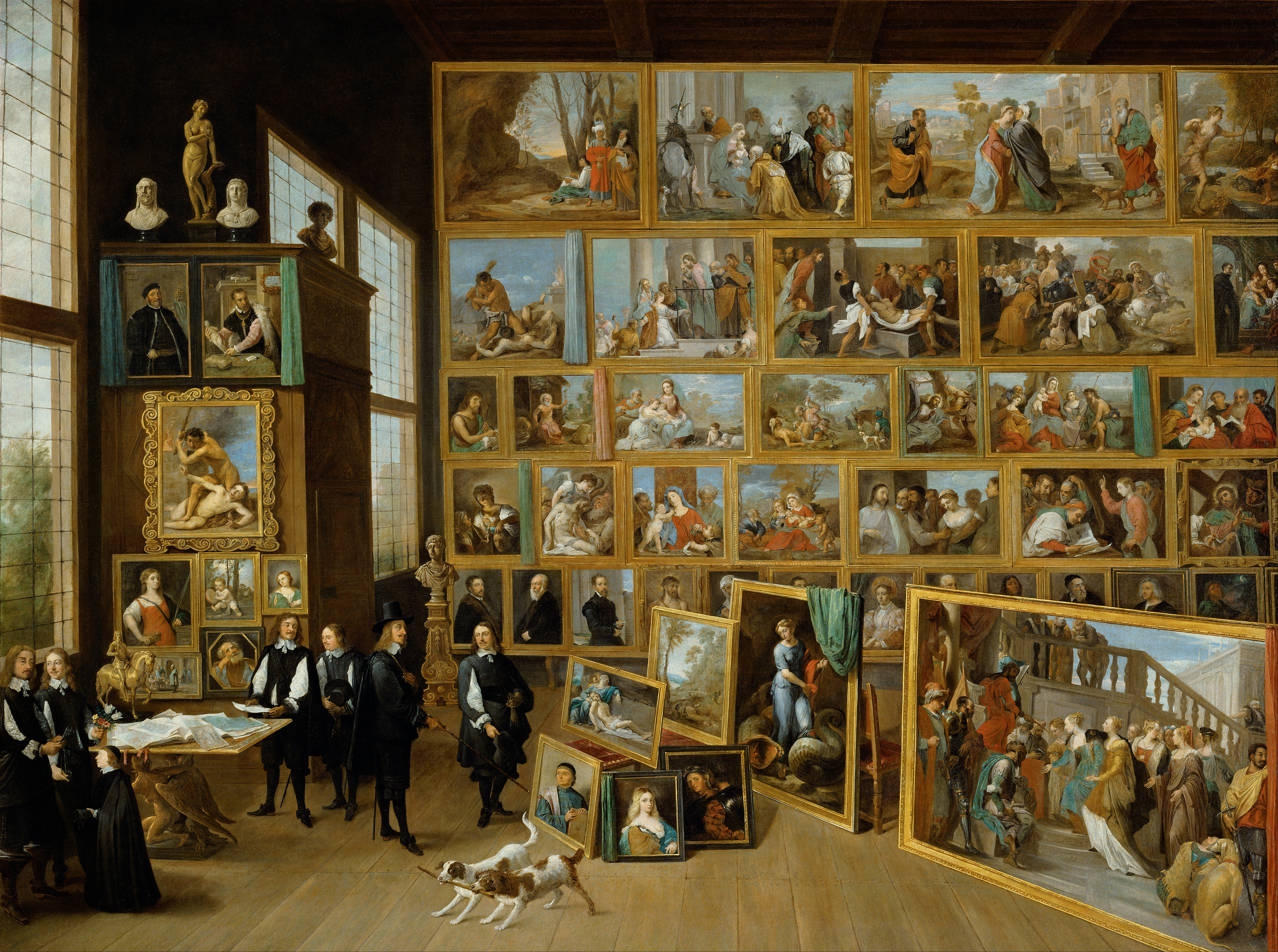
- Artist: David Teniers the Younger
- Year: c. 1650
- Medium: oil paint
- Dimensions: 123 cm (48 in) × 163 cm (64 in)
- Location: Kunsthistorisches Museum
- Identifiers: RKDimages ID: 44376

Archduke Leopold Wilhelm and the artist in the archducal picture gallery in Brussels is a 1651 painting of Archduke Leopold Wilhelm's Italian art collection by the Flemish Baroque painter David Teniers the Younger, now held in the Kunsthistorisches Museum in Vienna.

== Description ==
The painting shows the Archduke as a collector with friends admiring a set of paintings. The artist himself holds his hat in his hand and is listening to his patron as the Archduke gestures with his cane towards some recent acquisitions. The paintings are arranged in rows on a rear wall, with several others on the side of the vestibule on the left, and a set that are positioned in the foreground leaning against chairs for inspection.

== History ==
This painting is a copy by the artist and one of the first that David Teniers the Younger prepared to document the Archduke's collection before he employed 12 engravers to publish his Theatrum Pictorium, considered the "first illustrated art catalog". He published this book of engravings after the Archduke had moved to Austria and taken his collection with him. It was published in Antwerp in 1659 and again in 1673. The original version of this painting, with the figures arranged differently, is in the collection of Petworth House, south of London.

== Paintings depicted ==
Most of the recognizable paintings in the collection, not all of which were included in the Italian catalog prepared by Teniers, are still in the Viennese collection. The full list of the depicted paintings is the same as the Petworth version. That version, which includes a portrait of Bishop Anthonius Triest (1576-1657), served as the basis for this copy, though they are about the same size and were possibly both made at the same time in tandem. The Bishop was an art collector and a patron of many of Teniers's contemporary artists in Antwerp, and introduced Teniers to the Archduke. This copy remained in the archducal collection, while several others were documented as gifts. The most impressive of these was the large version on copper in the Museo del Prado with a different selection of paintings.
