= 1515 in art =

Events from the year 1515 in art.

== Events ==
- Giovanni Antonio da Brescia's engraving of the Belvedere Torso attracts the interest of connoisseurs and artists outside Rome.

== Works ==
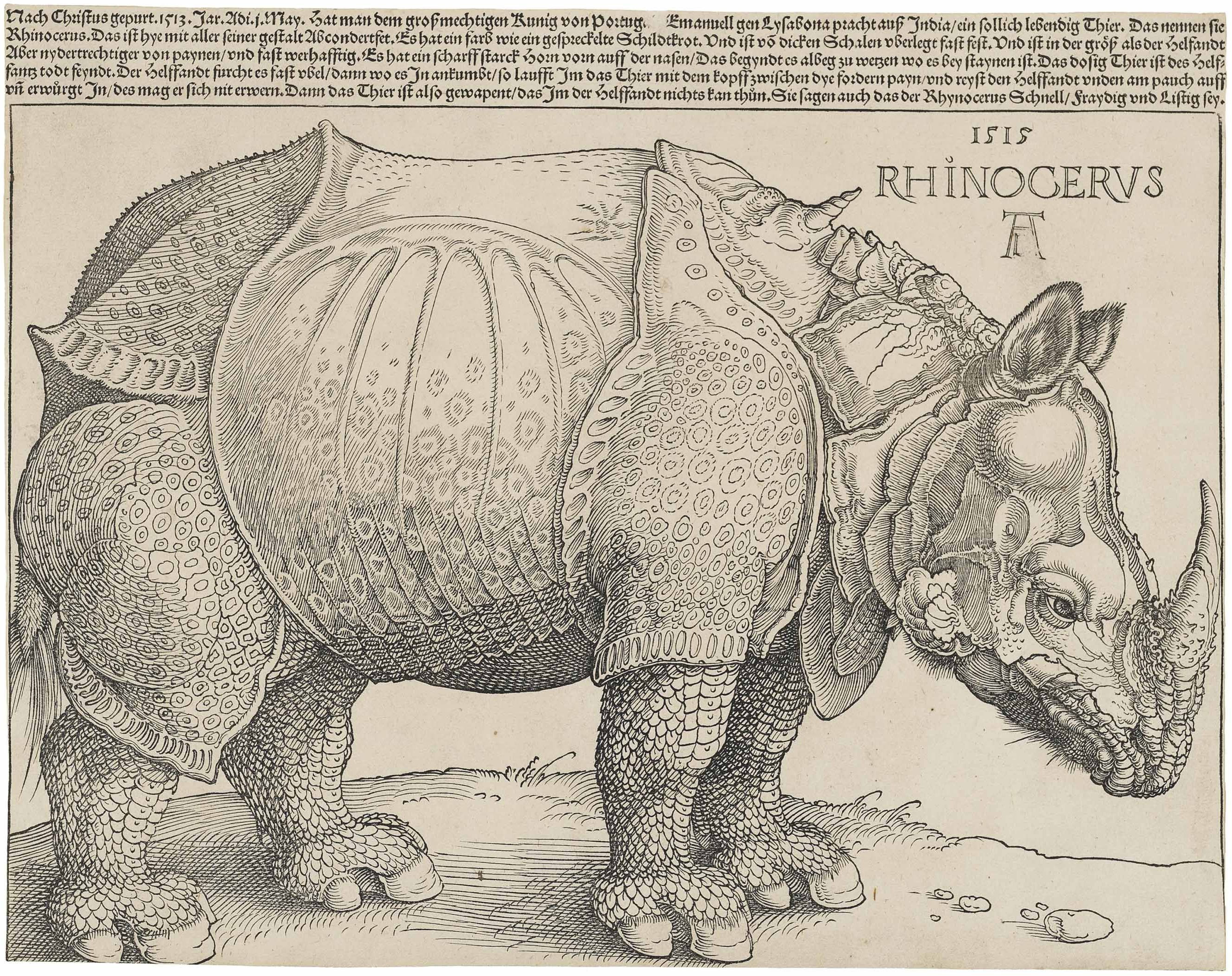
Dürer's Rhinoceros

- Giovanni Bellini – Naked Young Woman in Front of the Mirror
- Cima da Conegliano – Virgin and Child with Saints and Donors (Cleveland Museum of Art)
- Piero di Cosimo – The Myth of Prometheus (series)
- Lucas Cranach the Elder – The Massacre of the Innocents (approximate date)
- Gerard David – Virgin and Child with Four Angels (approximate completion date)
- Albrecht Dürer
  - "Arch of Honor" (printed 1517/18)
  - The Rhinoceros (woodcut)
- Innocenzo di Pietro Francucci da Imola – The Virgin and Child with Saints Sebastian, Roch, Cosmas and Damian
- Jan Gossaert – The Adoration of the Kings
- Matthias Grünewald – Isenheim Altarpiece (Unterlinden Museum, Colmar, Alsace)
- Leonardo da Vinci – Bacchus
- Jacopo Pontormo – Pharaoh with his Butler and Baker
- Raphael
  - Portrait of Baldassare Castiglione (probable date)
  - Portrait of Bindo Altoviti
  - La velata
- Titian (some dates approximate)
  - Noli me tangere
  - Salome
  - Tarquin and Lucretia (attributed)
  - Vanity
  - Violante
  - Woman with a Mirror
  - Young Woman in a Black Dress

== Births ==
- October 4 - Lucas Cranach the Younger, German painter and wood-engraver (died 1586)
- probable
  - Jean Bullant, French sculptor and architect (died 1578)
  - Nicolas Denisot, French Renaissance poet and painter (died 1559)
  - Willem Key, Flemish painter (died 1568)
  - (born 1515/1520) Lambert Sustris, Dutch painter (died 1584)

== Deaths ==
- November 5 – Mariotto Albertinelli, Italian Renaissance painter (born 1474)
- date unknown - Pietro Lombardo, Italian Renaissance sculptor and architect (born 1435)
- probable
  - Giulio Campagnola, Italian engraver and painter, inventor of the stipple technique in engraving (born 1482)
  - Vincenzo Foppa, Italian painter (born 1430)
