= Lucretia and her Husband Lucius Tarquinius Collatinus =

1515 painting by Titian

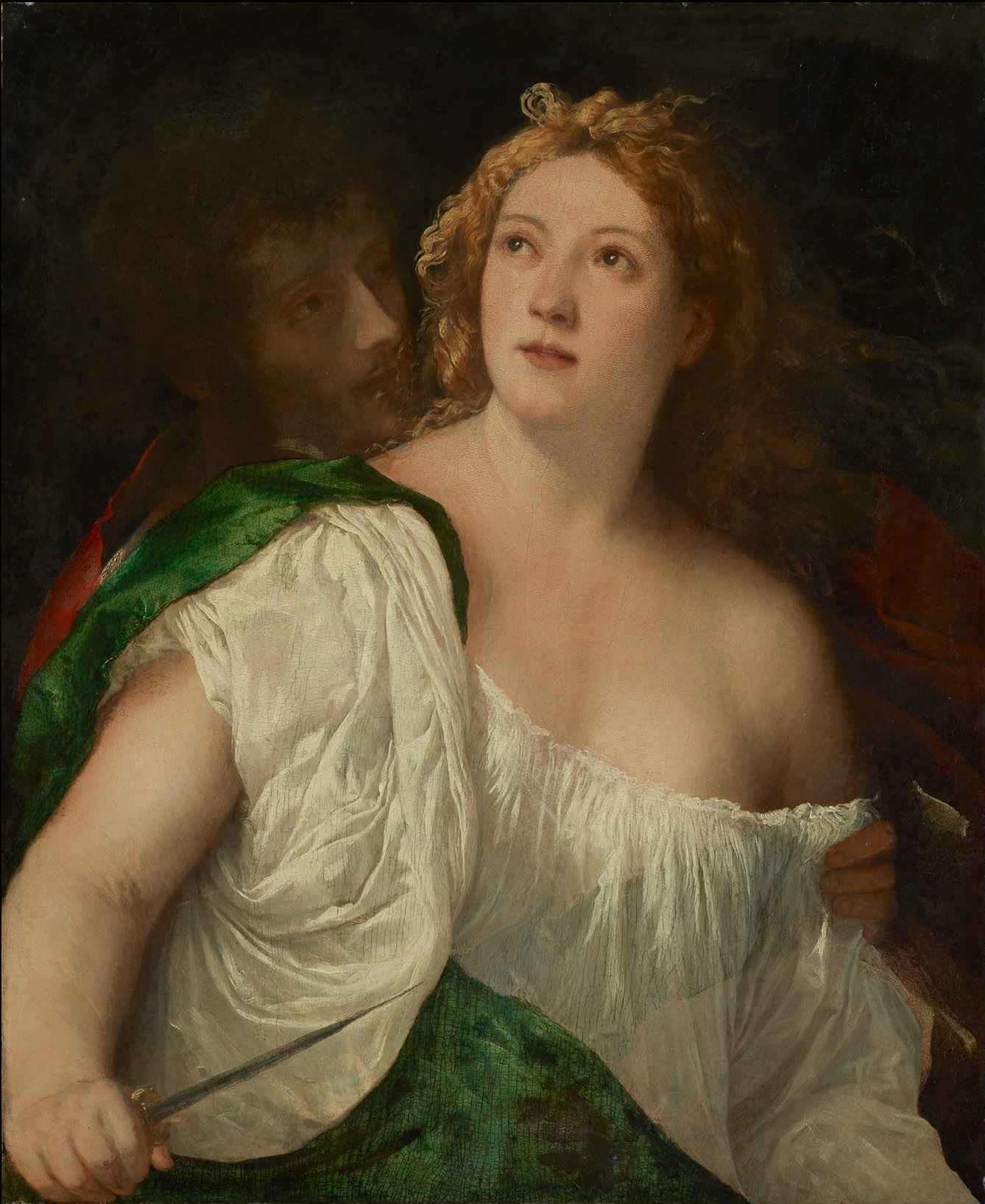
- Artist: Titian
- Year: c. 1515
- Medium: Oil on panel
- Dimensions: 82 cm × 68 cm (32 in × 27 in)
- Location: Kunsthistorisches Museum; Vienna

Lucretia and her Husband Lucius Tarquinius Collatinus or Tarquin and Lucretia is an oil painting attributed to Titian, dated to around 1515 and now in the Kunsthistorisches Museum in Vienna. The attribution to this artist is traditional but uncertain - the brightened palette suggests it could instead be by Palma Vecchio. However, others identify the painting as part of Titian's series of half-length female figures from 1514 to 1515, which also includes the Flora at the Uffizi, the Woman with a Mirror at the Louvre, the Violante and the Young woman in a black dress in Vienna, Vanity in Munich and the Salome at the Galleria Doria Pamphilj. There is an early copy in the Royal Collection.

Lucretia poised with a dagger, about to commit suicide, was becoming a very common subject in art. However, the addition of a male figure just behind her is all but unique. The Kunsthistorisches Museum now calls this figure Lucius Tarquinius Collatinus, Lucretia's husband, but the Royal Collection identifies him as her rapist, Sextus Tarquinius (known as Tarquin), as do most sources. Her husband was present at her death, according to most of the differing Roman accounts of the story, and Tarquin was not. If the figure is intended to be Tarquin, the setting must be the night before, with Lucretia perhaps making her plan.

The painting depicts Lucretia about to commit suicide to preserve her honour after disclosing her rape by Sextus Tarquinius the previous night, making her the model of Roman female virtus. Her face looks up to the divine illumination coming from above, giving her the strength to commit the act. As in other treatments of the subject, there are sensual elements, such as Lucretia's falling robe and almost-bared breast. The robe's green is particularly bright, witnessing to the high quality of pigments available in Venice.

The painting can be seen as one of a number of Venetian paintings of the 1510s showing two or three half-length figures with heads close together, often with their expressions and interactions enigmatic. Most of these are "Giorgionesque" genre or tronie subjects where the subjects are anonymous.

The painting in Vienna, or the other version still in the Royal Collection, may be the painting mentioned by Ridolfi in 1648 as being in the gallery of Charles I of England, whose Italian paintings mainly came from his purchase of the Gonzaga collection in Mantua. The Vienna version might have passed to the collection of Archduke Leopold Wilhelm of Austria.

Titian's better known late depiction of Lucretia's rape by Tarquin was completed over 50 years later, in 1571 (Fitzwilliam Museum, Cambridge).
