= Venus and Cupid =

Venus and Cupid may refer to:

- Venus and Cupid (Gentileschi), a c. 1625–1626 painting by Artemisia Gentileschi
- Venus and Cupid (Holbein), or Venus and Amor, a c. 1526–1528 painting by Hans Holbein the Younger
- Venus and Cupid (Lotto), a c. 1530 painting by Lorenzo Lotto
- Venus and Cupid (Pontormo), a c. 1533 painting by Pontormo
- Venus and Cupid (Sustris), a c. 1554 painting by Lambert Sustris
- Venus and Cupid (Titian), a c. 1510–1515 painting by Titian
- Venus and Cupid (sculpture), or Love, The Most Beautiful of Absolute Disasters, a 2005 work by Shane A. Johnstone

== See also ==
- Venus and Cupid with a Satyr, a c. 1528 painting by Correggio
