= The Bravo (Titian) =

1516-17 painting by Titian

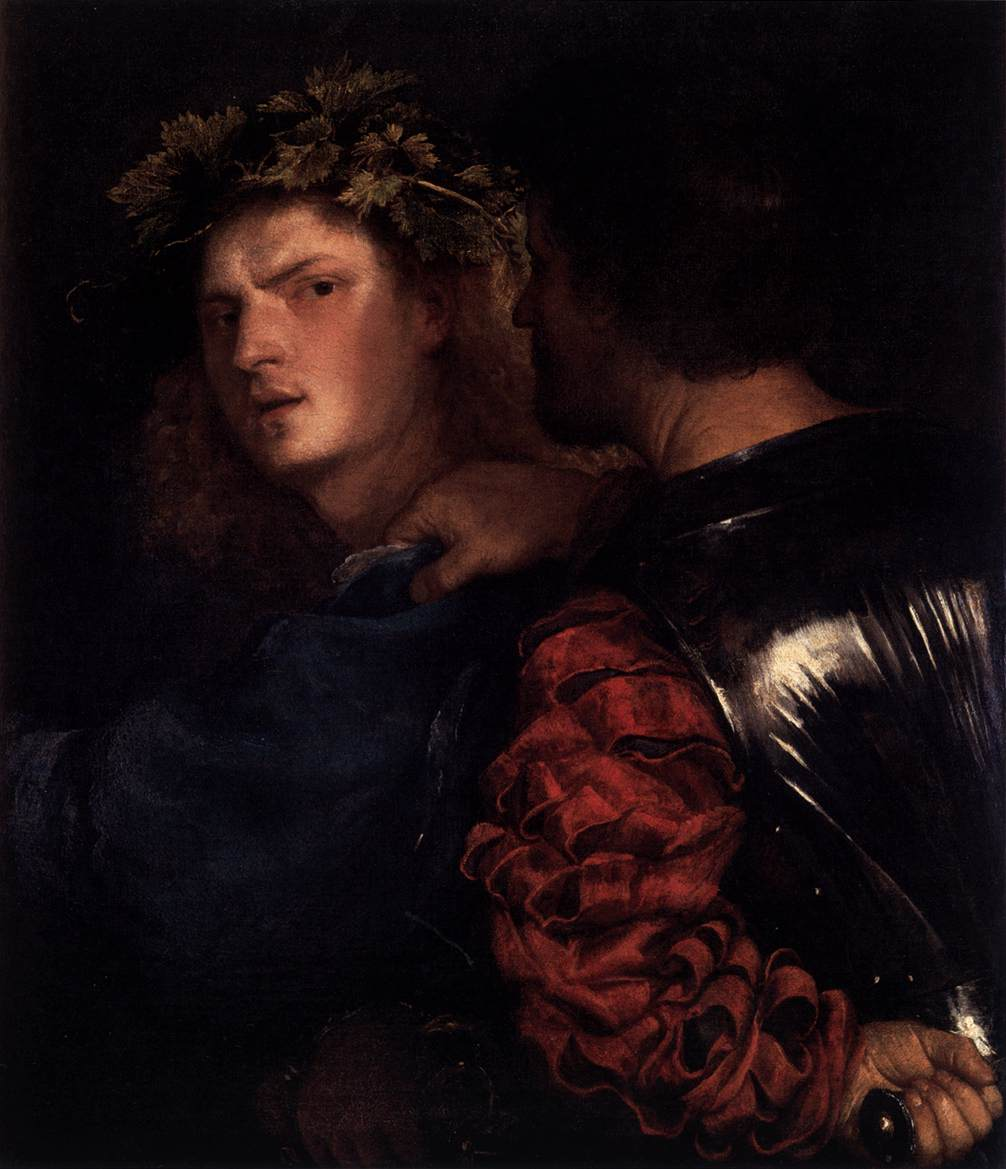
- Artist: Titian
- Year: c. 1515-1520
- Medium: Oil on canvas
- Dimensions: 77 cm × 66.5 cm (30 in × 26.2 in)
- Location: Kunsthistorisches Museum; Vienna

The Bravo is an oil painting usually attributed to Titian, dated to around 1516-17 and now in the Kunsthistorisches Museum in Vienna. The painting can be seen as one of a number of Venetian paintings of the 1510s showing two or three half-length figures with heads close together, often with their expressions and interactions enigmatic. Most of these are "Giorgionesque" genre or tronie subjects where the subjects are anonymous, though the group includes Titian's The Tribute Money, with Christ as the main figure, which is similar in style to this painting, and his Lucretia and her Husband, also in Vienna, where at least the woman's identity is clear, if not that of the man.

Alternative attributions are to Giorgione (in the past) and Palma Vecchio.

== Description ==
Against a dark background two male figures are shown, one in front of the other, with the rear one looking over his shoulder at a foreground figure who is tapping his shoulder, making him turn sharply. This foreground figure is dressed in armour and his other hand hides a dagger or a sword of which we see only the hilt, suggesting an attack is imminent. The rear figure is a young man with flowing blonde hair, wearing a garland of vine leaves on his head, who has also reached for his weapon, the hilt dimly visible at bottom centre. The foreground figure has his head turned away from the viewer.

Various attempts have been made to assign the scene to a specific incident in myth or history. One suggestion is the arrest of Bacchus's follower Acoetes by Pentheus, king of Thebes, which would explain the wreath of vine-leaves in his hair. An x-ray of the painting showed that the head of the man on the right (the foreground figure) once wore a crown.

== History and attribution ==
The painting was probably in the Venetian collection of Zuanantonio Venier in 1526, who had one then described as "two half-figures attacking each other by Titian". In 1636 it was sold to the Duke of Hamilton, who brought it to London. Most of his purchases were from the collection of Bartolomeo della Nave, who perhaps had it by then. After Hamilton's execution, it was acquired by Archduke Leopold Wilhelm of Austria, whose collection later became part of the Habsburg imperial collection in Vienna, then passed to the Kunsthistorisches Museum.

An etching after a reduced copy by David Teniers the Younger shows the painting attributed to Giorgione. The painting must have been a popular painting when it was in the Archduke's cabinet, as it was portrayed in some of his gallery paintings by Teniers.

The work was attributed to Titian by the Italian art historian Roberto Longhi, which remains usual. But for John Steer the painting was "surely by" Palma Vecchio.

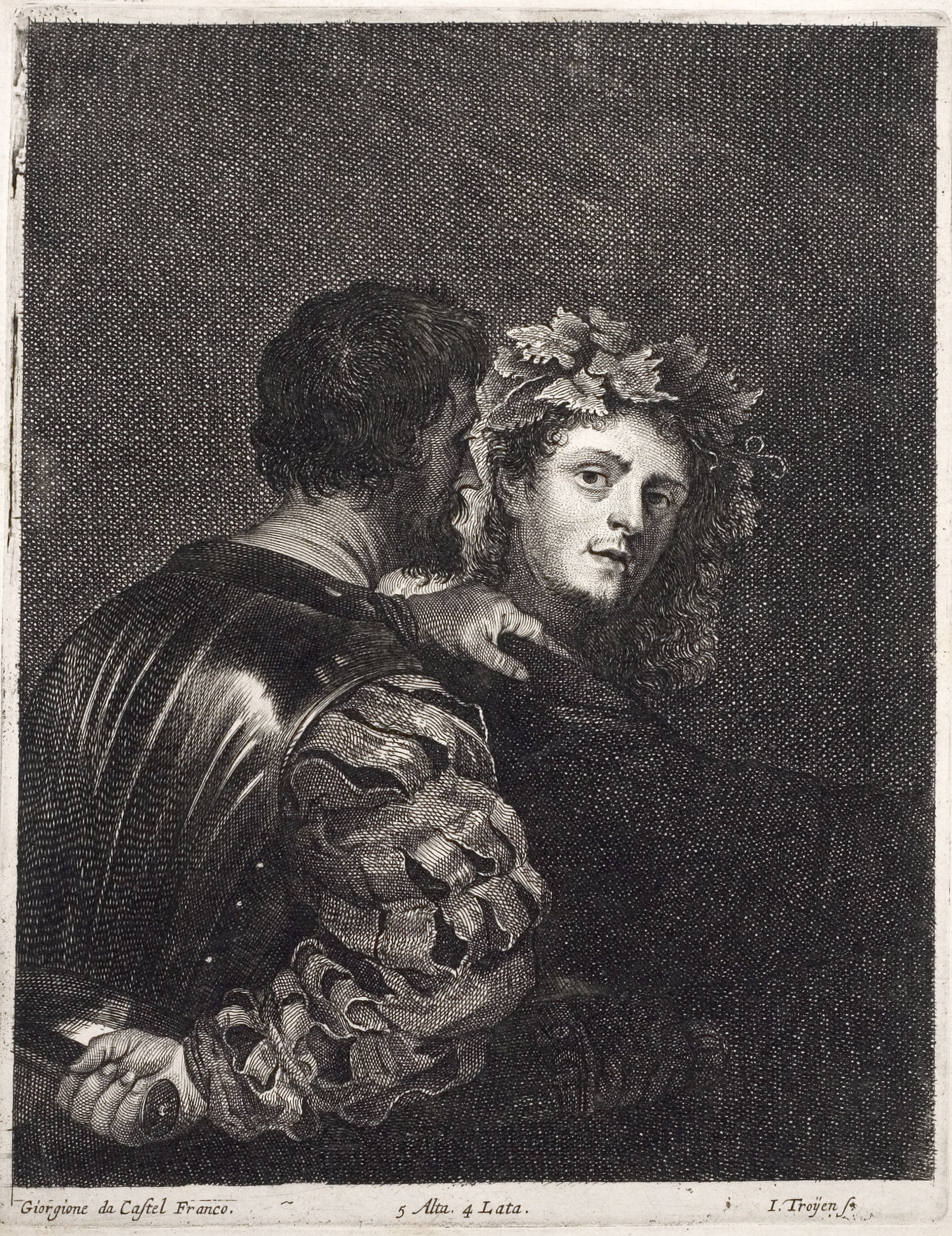
Etching from the Arolsen klebeband, a version of the catalog by Teniers, which shows attribution to Giorgione

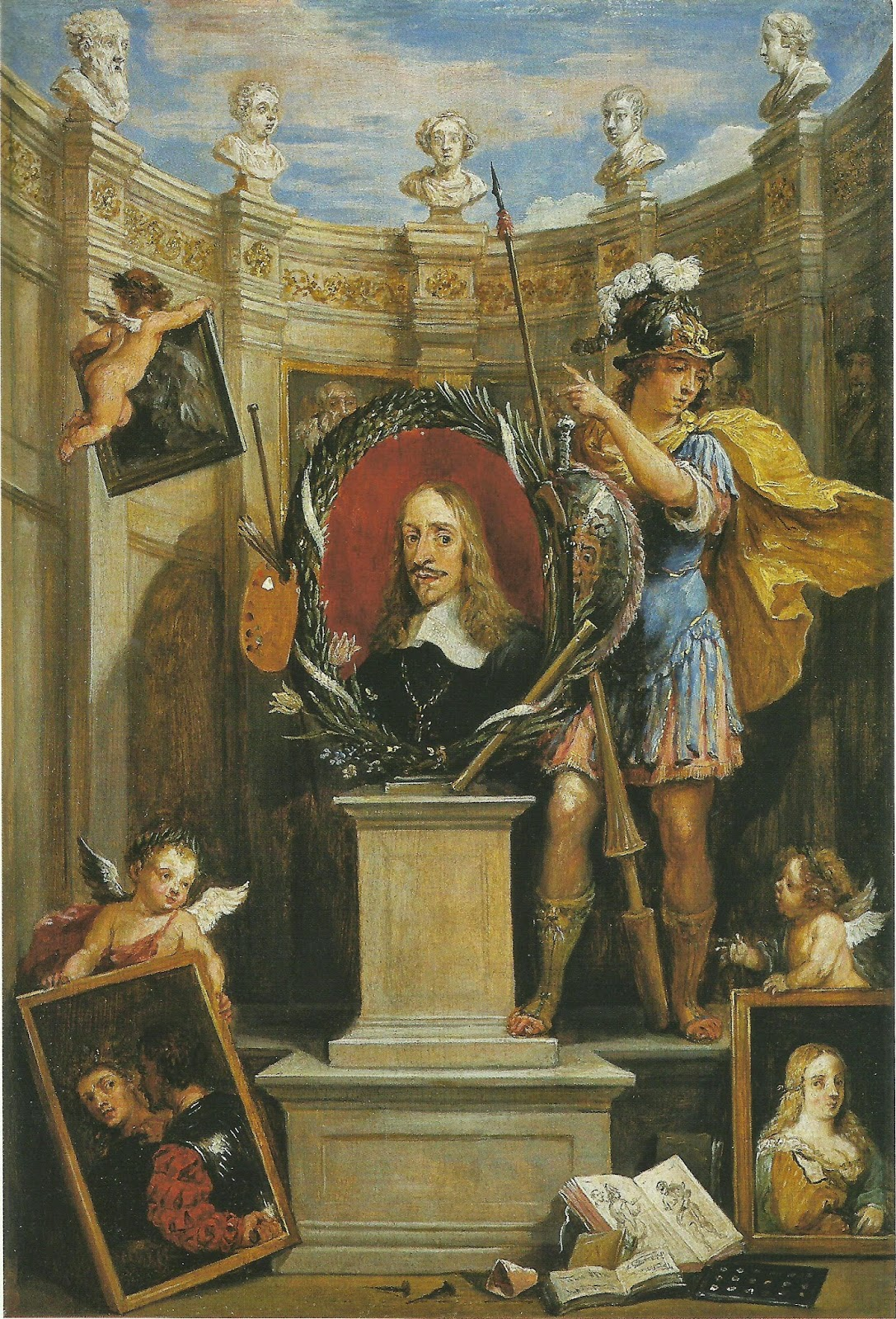
This painting, along with its pendant Violante in the frontispiece for Teniers the Younger's catalog of 1659-1673

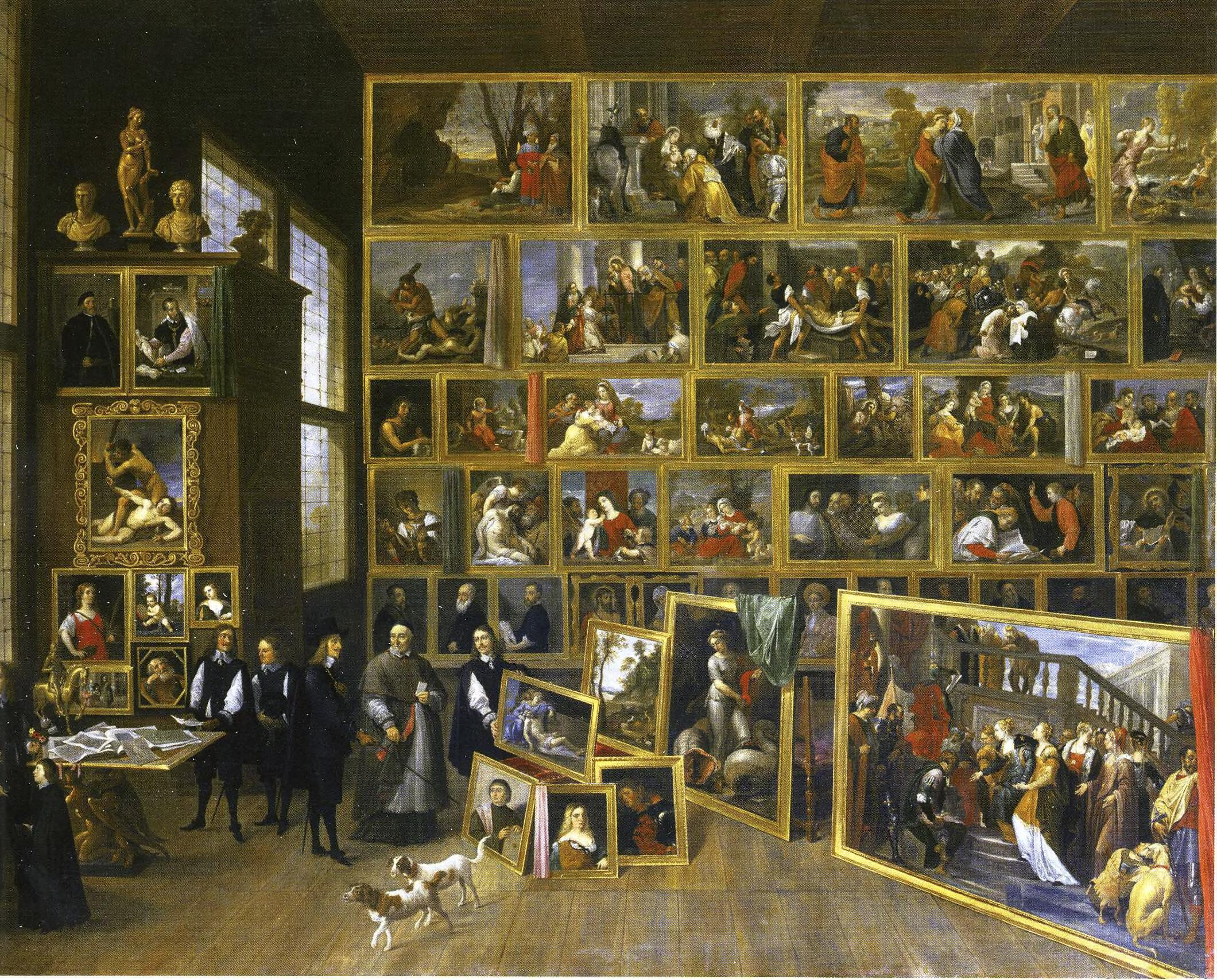
Archduke's gallery (collection Petworth House)

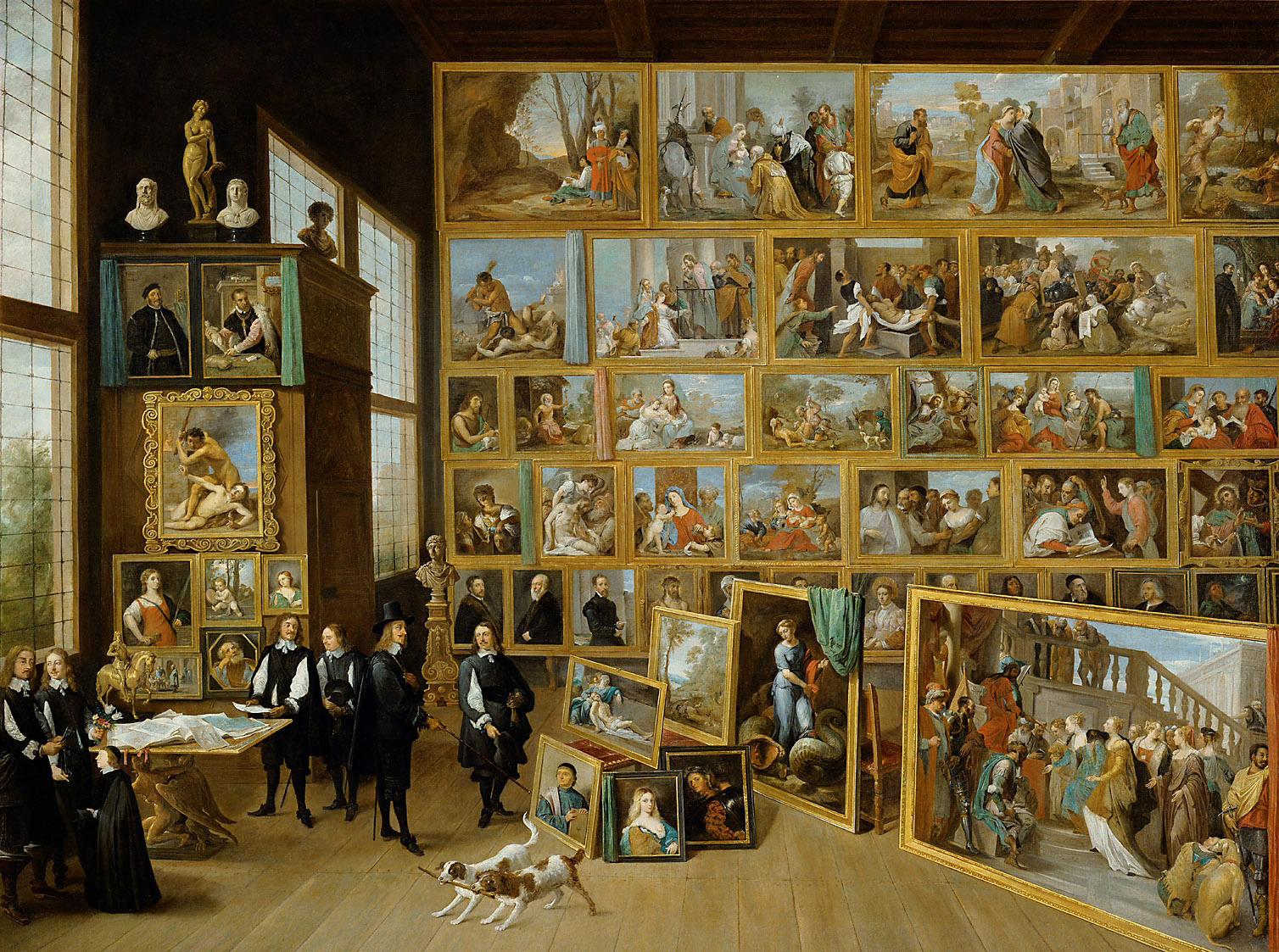
Archduke's gallery (collection Kunsthistorisches Museum)
