= Violante (Titian) =

1515 painting by Titian

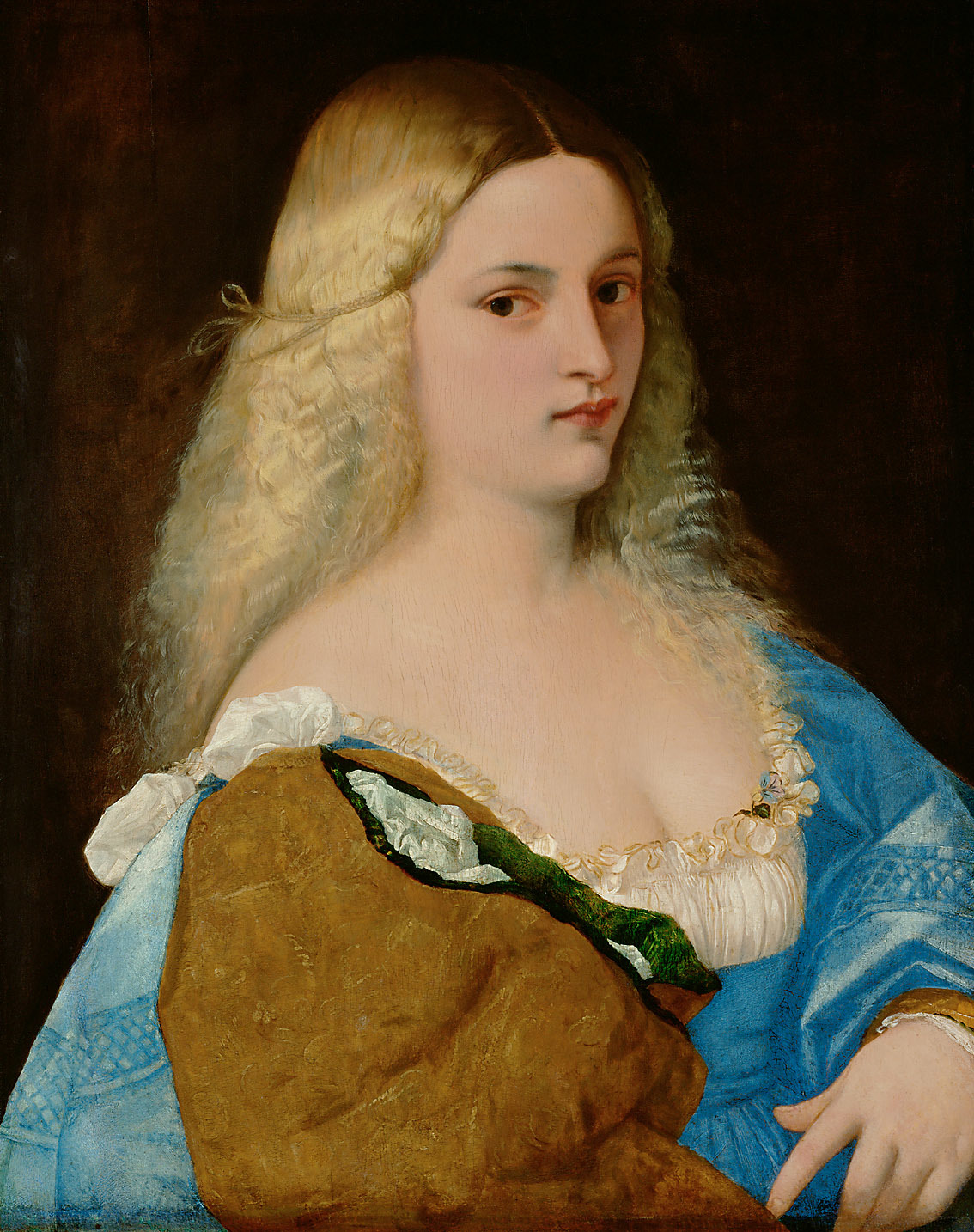
- Artist: Titian
- Year: c. 1515
- Medium: Oil on poplar panel
- Dimensions: 64.5 cm × 50.8 cm (25.4 in × 20.0 in)
- Location: Kunsthistorisches Museum; Vienna

Violante is an oil on panel painting attributed to Titian, dated to c. 1515. It is held at the Kunsthistorisches Museum, in Vienna.

== History ==
The work was part of the Venetian collection of Bartolomeo della Nave and in 1636, it was sold to the Duke of Hamilton, who brought it to London. In 1659, it was acquired by Archduke Leopold Wilhelm of Austria, whose collection later became part of the current museum. The painting was popular when it was in the Archduke's cabinet, as it was portrayed in several of his gallery paintings from the 1650s and was even included twice in the gallery highlights series of etchings known as Theatrum Pictorium, or Theater of paintings; once as an illustration (plate 194) by Lucas Vorsterman II with caption and reproduced again by Teniers himself for the frontispiece.

The title refers to the traditional identification with Violante, the daughter of painter Palma the Elder, though this has been disputed as the other beautiful women of the same painting series with different features have also been called Violante. The 1655-1660 illustrations for David Teniers the Younger's Theatrum pictorium lacked titles but included captions (later editions also included plate numbers and this one is plate 194). The captions show the attribution, the size in palm height and width, the engraver, and occasionally another collaborator for the engraving. The one has the caption "I. Palma Senior pinxit, 4 Alta 3 Lata, L. Vorsterman f."

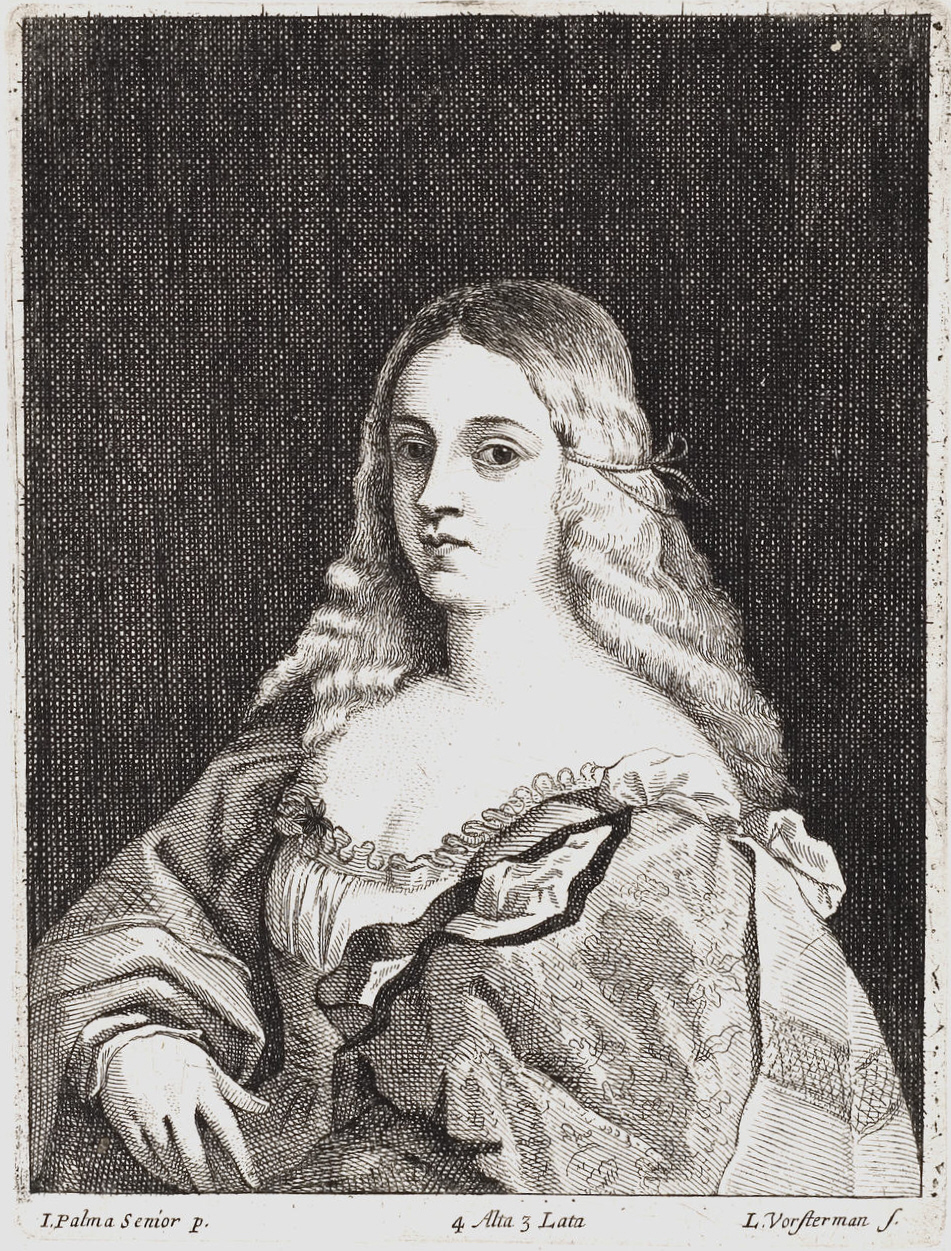
1660 engraving by Lucas Vorsterman II from the Arolsen klebeband, one of many early 18th-century scrapbook albums featuring engravings from the popular catalog by Teniers, which shows the caption.

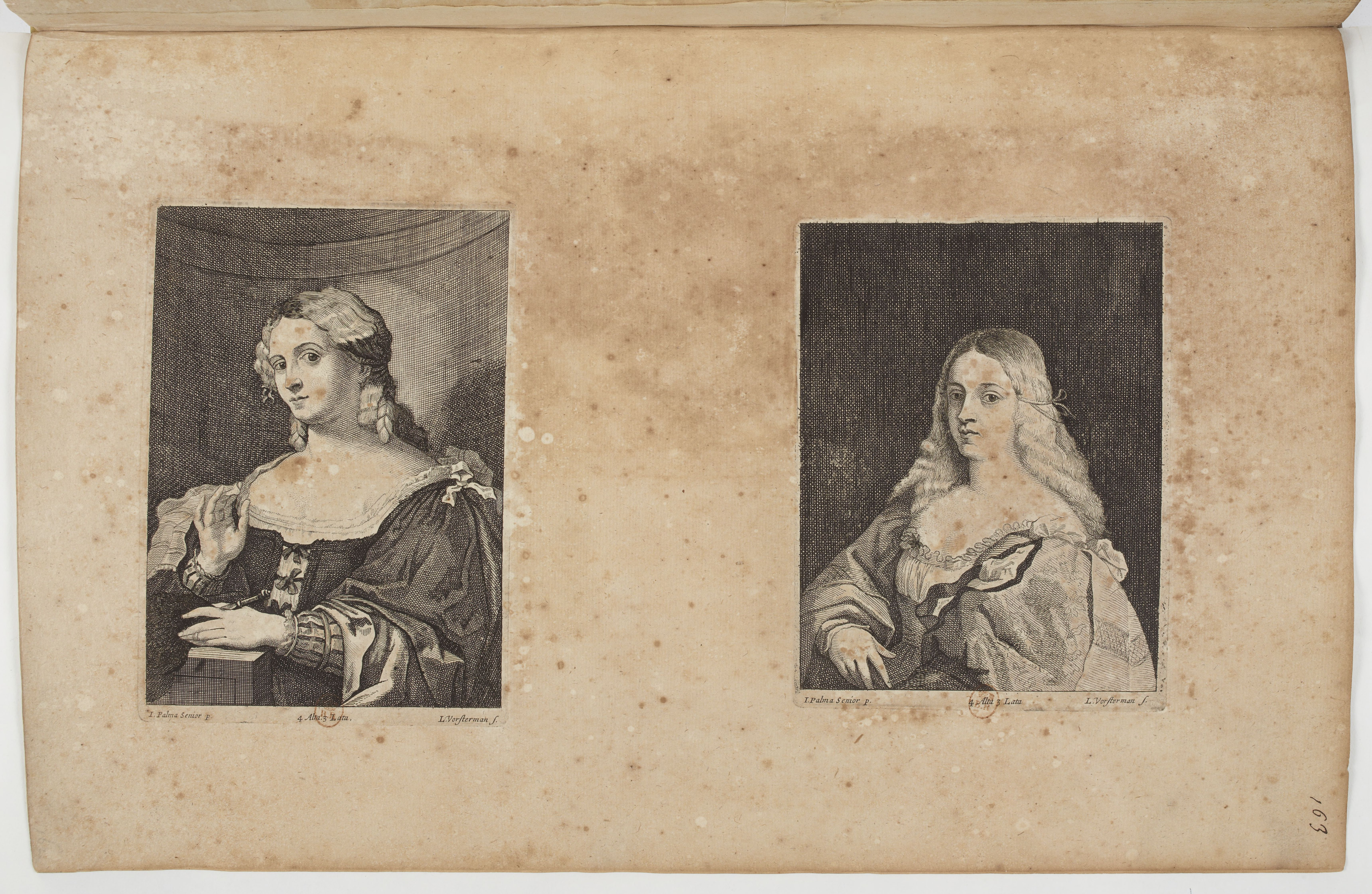
The engraving was paired in the catalog with plate 195, a painting with the same size and provenance also engraved by Vorsterman, here shown in a page from a 1660 album in the French National Library

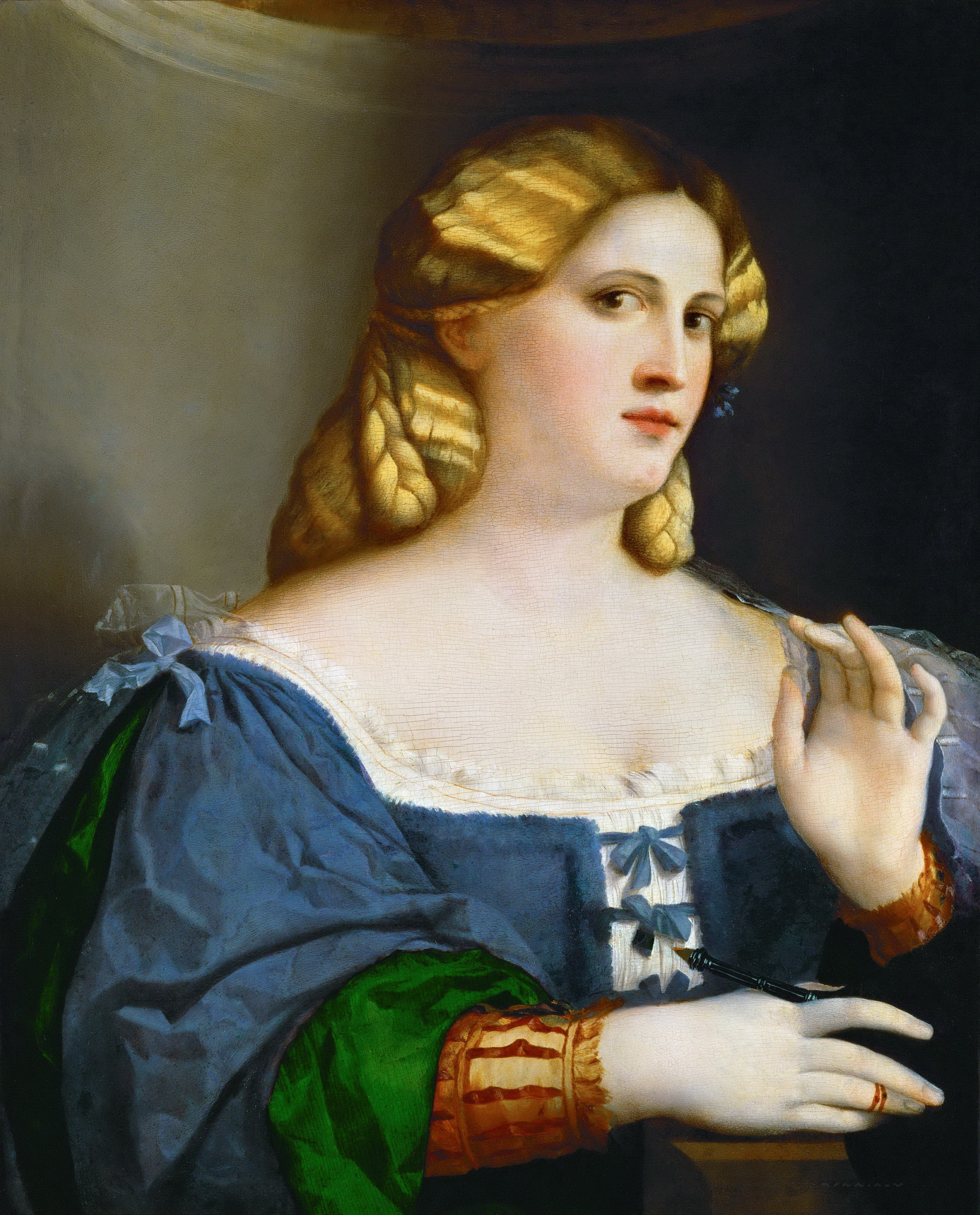
The painting Young Woman in a Blue Dress, with Fan with the same provenance, still attributed to Palma Vecchio

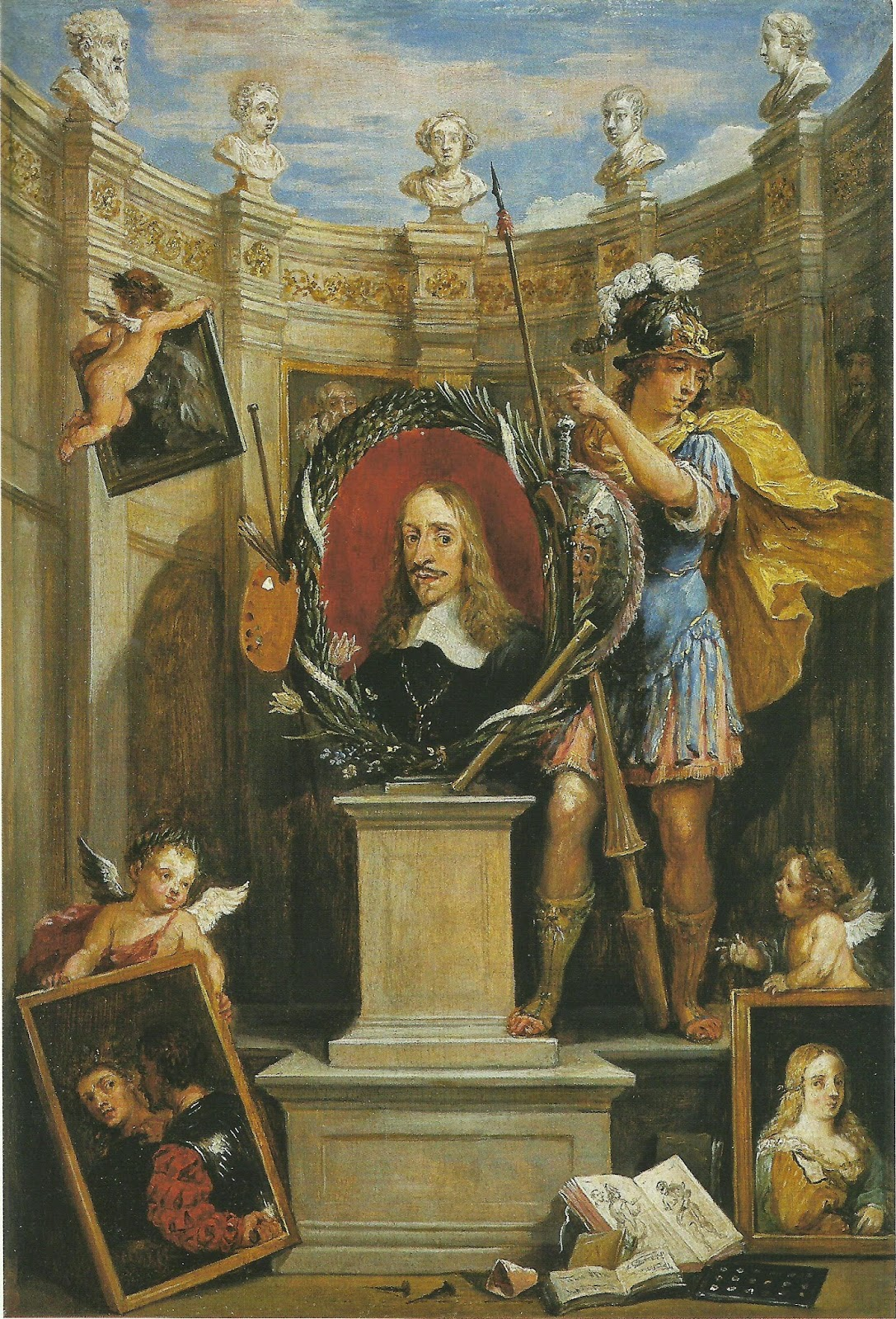
This painting, along with its gallery pendant The Bravo were not only included with illustrations in the catalog, but can also be seen featured in the frontispiece for Teniers' Theatrum pictorium

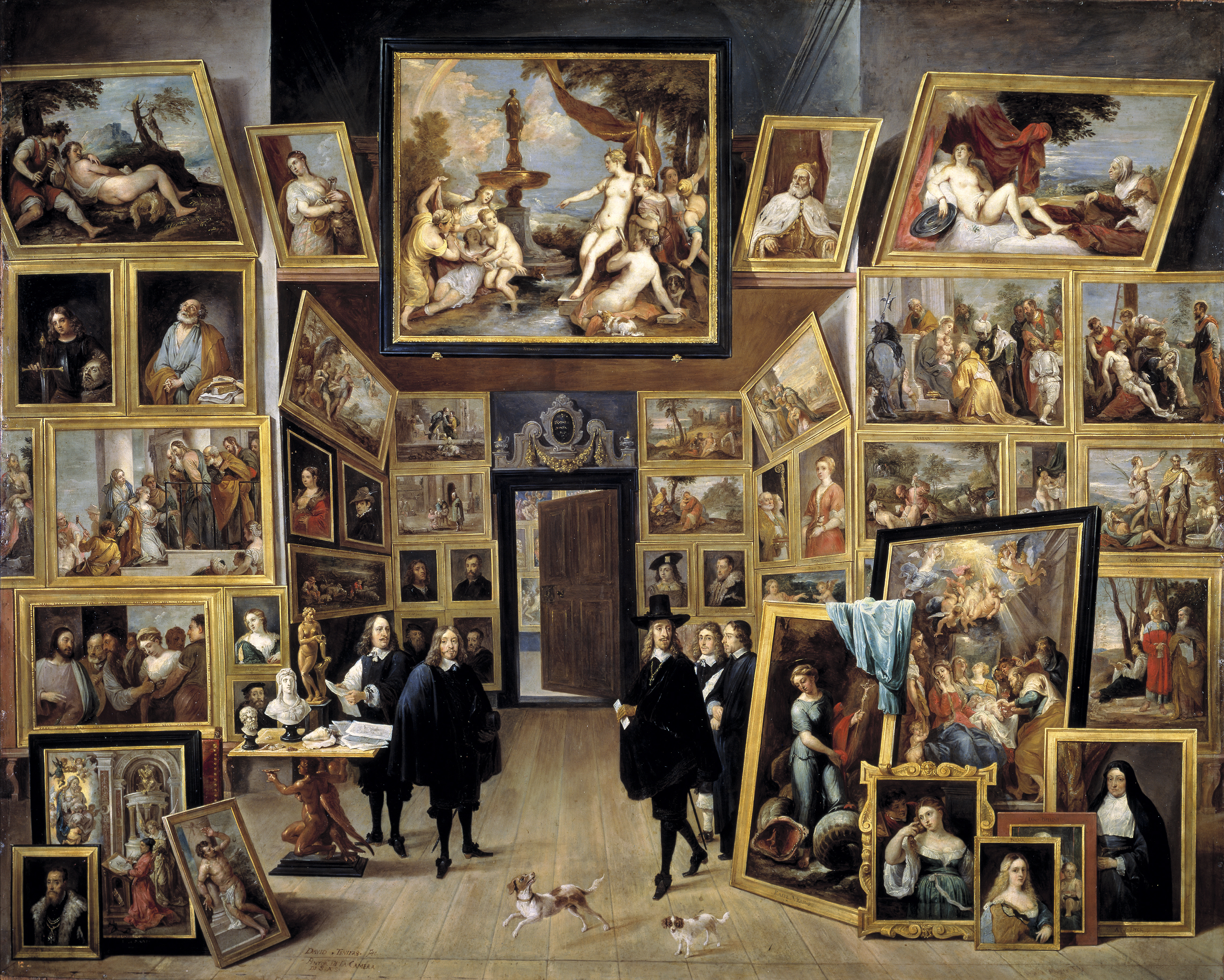
Archduke's gallery (collection Prado)

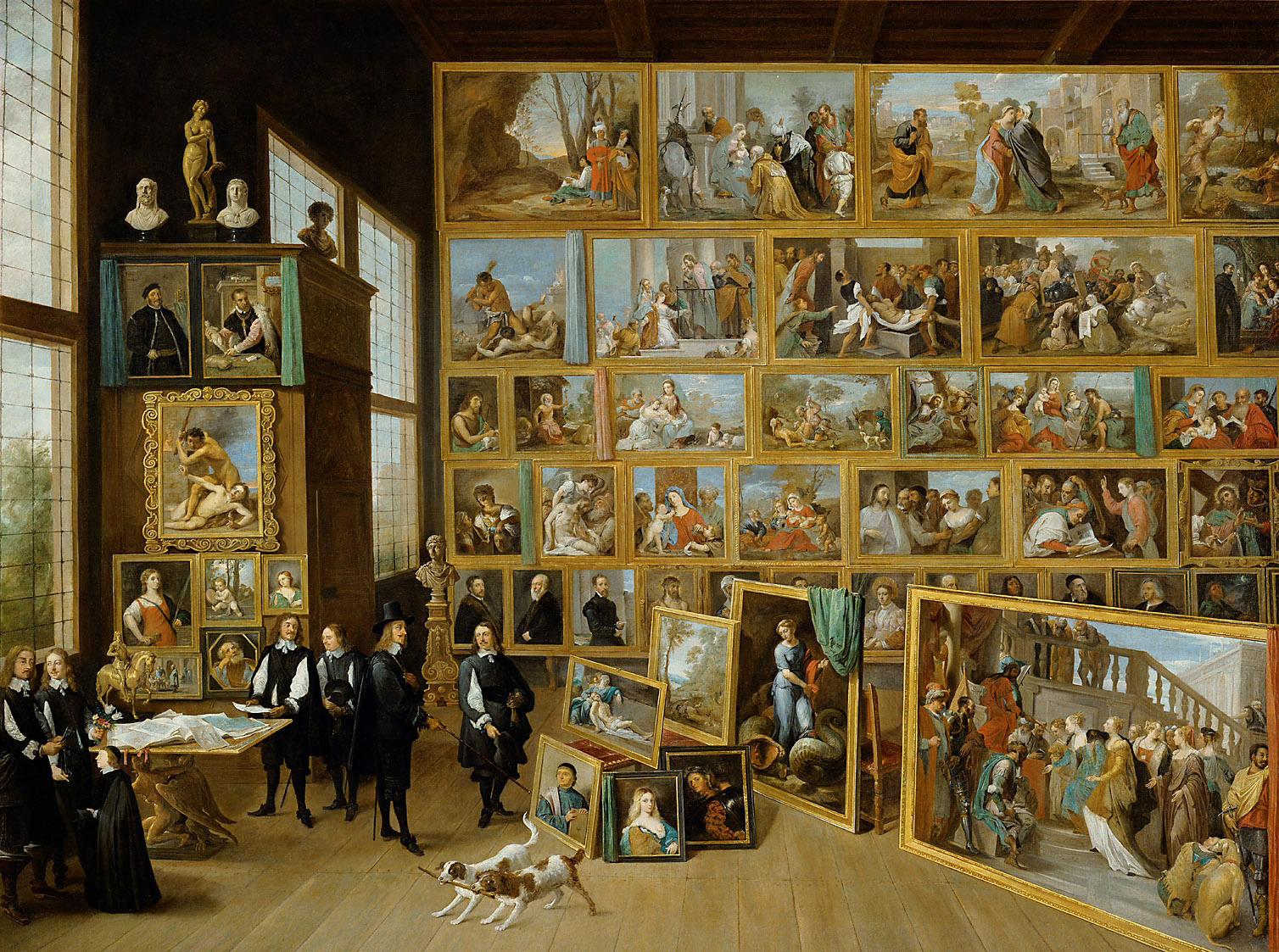
Archduke's gallery, in the collection Kunsthistorisches Museum and showing it in the foreground with gallery pendant The Bravo

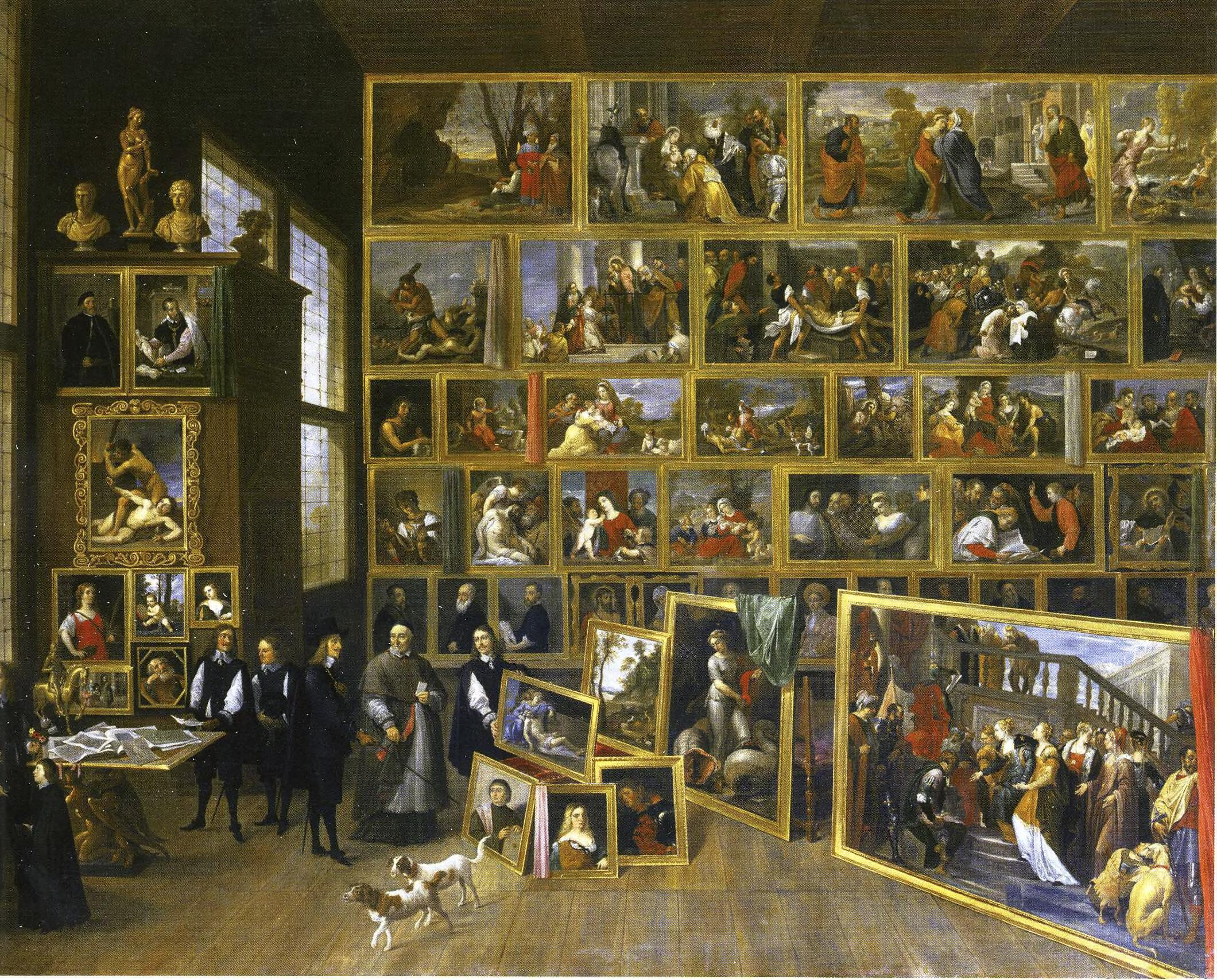
Archduke's gallery (collection Petworth House), a replica of the Vienna version

The old attribution was later questioned and the work was attributed to Titian by Italian art historian Roberto Longhi. The woman portrayed is very similar to that in the Balbi Holy Conversation and a series of portraits of wavy-haired blonde women such as the Woman with a Mirror, Flora, the Vanity, Salome and the Young Woman in a Black Dress.
