= The Tribute Money (Titian) =

1516 painting by Titian

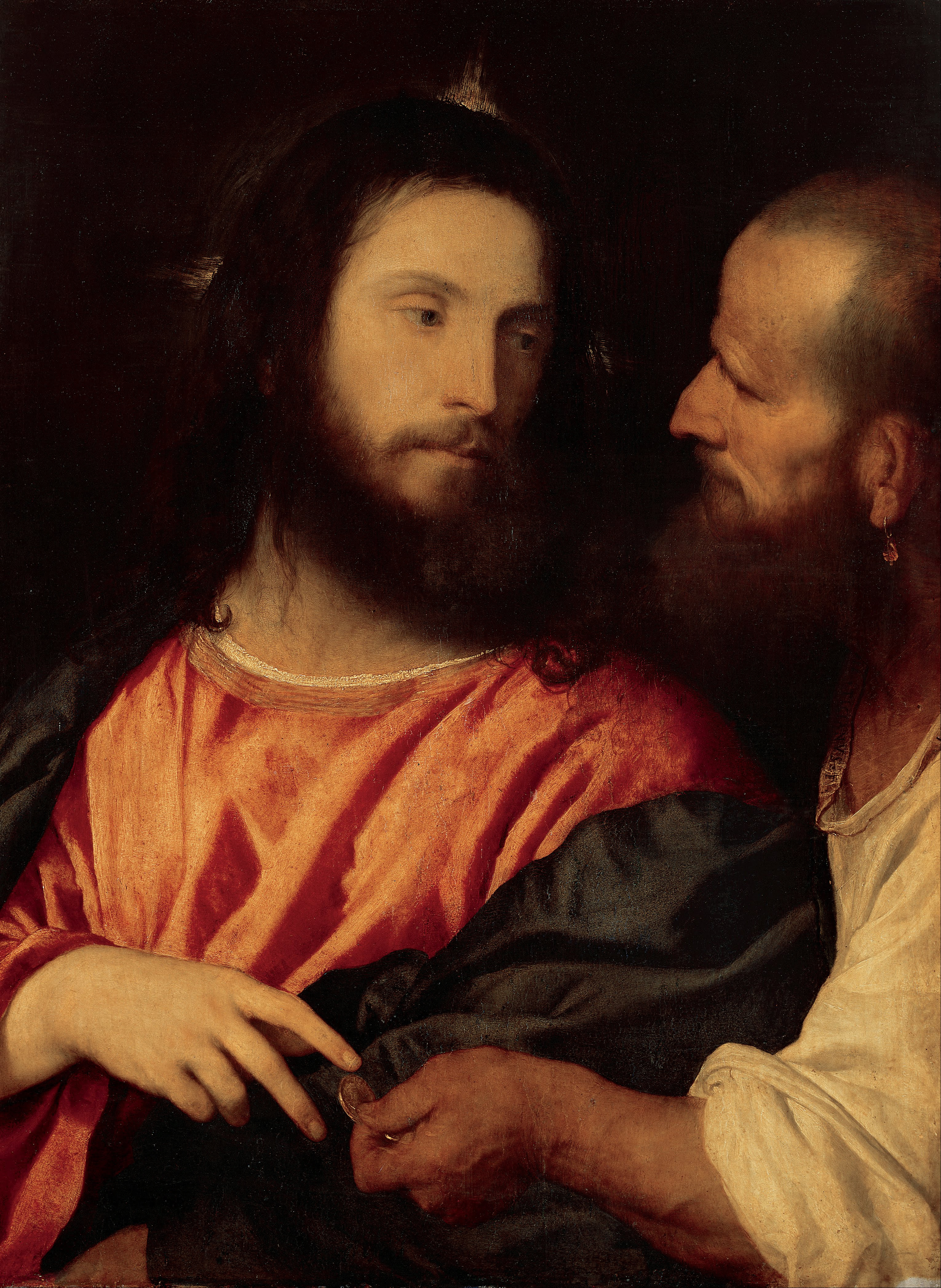
- Artist: Titian
- Year: 1516
- Medium: Oil on panel
- Dimensions: 75 cm × 56 cm (30 in × 22 in)
- Location: Gemäldegalerie Alte Meister, Dresden

The Tribute Money (Italian: Cristo della moneta, lit. 'Christ of the coin') is a panel painting in oils of 1516 by the Italian late Renaissance artist Titian, now in the Gemäldegalerie Alte Meister in Dresden, Germany. It depicts Christ and a Pharisee at the moment in the Gospels when Christ is shown a coin and says "Render unto Caesar the things that are Caesar's, and unto God the things that are God's". It is signed "Ticianus F.[ecit]", painted on the trim of the left side of the Pharisee's collar.

It is possibly the earliest representation in art of this scene, which had a personal significance for Alfonso I d'Este, Duke of Ferrara, who commissioned it.

== Subject and purpose ==
The subject is rare in art, and some authorities have said that this is its first representation in art. The novelty is explained by the special significance of the subject for the patron, who is presumed to have suggested it. With one level of appropriateness, it was created for the door of a cupboard or cabinet containing the collection of medals and ancient and modern coins of Alfonso I d'Este, Duke of Ferrara. In the following years the duke became a very important patron of Titian, partly because he was impressed by this first commission.

At another level, the story had a political relevance. Duke Alfonzo's territories were partly in the Holy Roman Empire, and partly in the Papal States, giving the subject a particular meaning to him; the trap set for Christ by the question was one that Alfonso had been living in for some years. At the time the painting was produced he had been excommunicated and deprived, at least in theory, of some of his territories by the papacy, after not following the papacy when it changed sides in the War of the League of Cambrai. For most of this period he was opposed to the papacy, which had been aggressively expanding the Papal States, and wanted to absorb the Duchy of Ferrara (as it eventually did when Alfonso's grandson died in 1597). For Alfonso the message of the injunction of Christ in the "Tribute Money" episode was probably that the papacy should concentrate its attention on church matters, as opposed to expanding its territory. He included part of the gospel text of the episode on his gold coinage.

== Date and signature ==
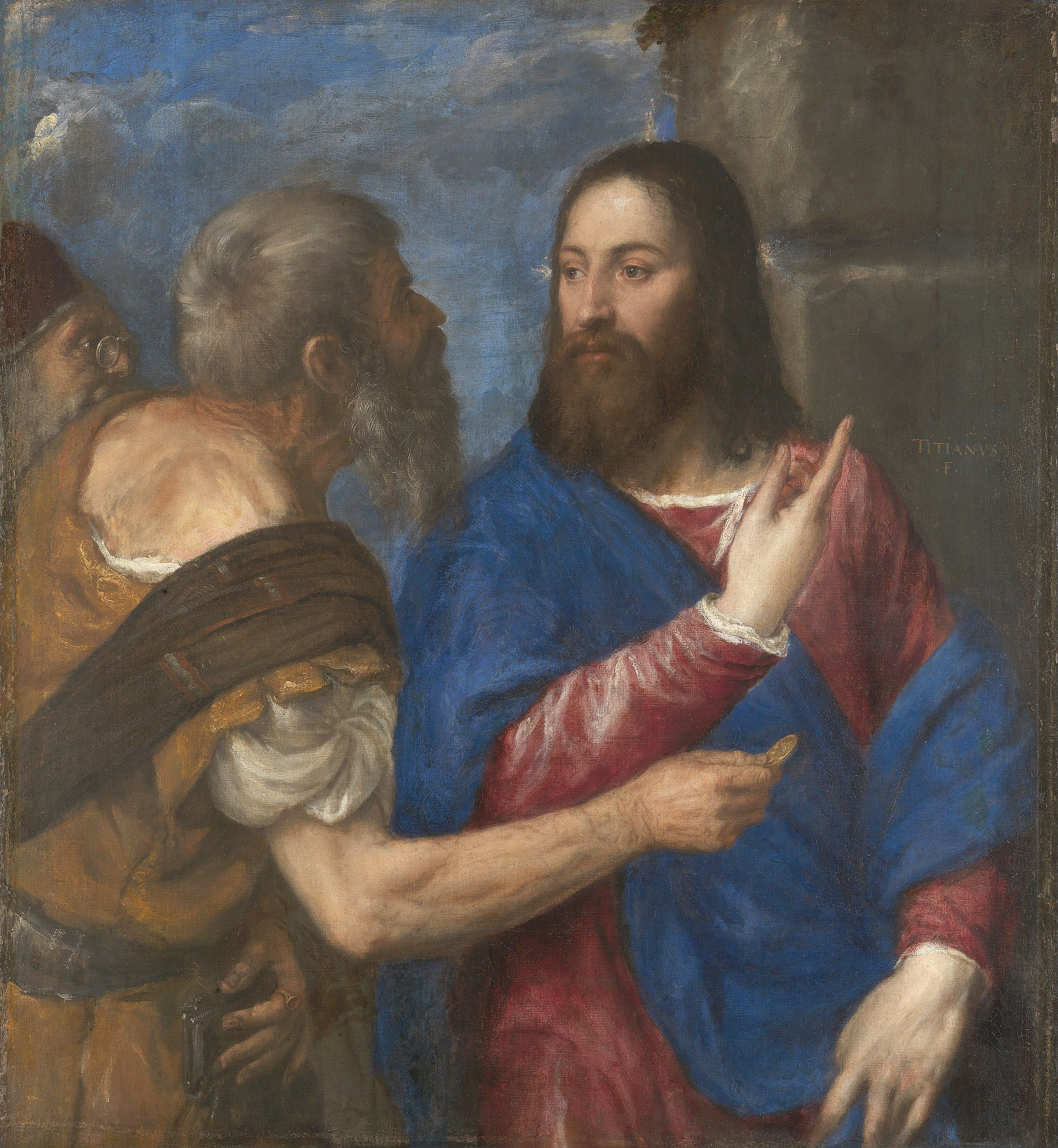
Titian's later composition, c. 1543–1568, National Gallery.

Unusually for an early Titian, the painting can be dated with confidence, as Titian and two assistants or servants spent some five weeks staying at Alfonso's Castello Estense in Ferrara from 22 February 1516 until the end of March. Titian normally painted on canvas, but the original use of the painting as a door necessitated the panel support here.

It is Titian's earliest signed painting, and was perhaps signed to show he was not a court painter, as well as advertising his name in a prominent court outside Venice and its territories. The location of the signature on the pharisee's collar may support it being a self-portrait (see below), with the signature "identifying the subject like the inscription below the profile portrait on a coin".

== Reception and later composition ==
The painting, which has been described as "Titian's sleekest, most polished early work", became famous. Giorgio Vasari thought the head of Christ "stupendous and miraculous" and that all artists at the time believed it to be Titian's most perfect painting. Carlo Ridolfi's biography relates that when he saw it, an envoy of the Emperor Charles V expressed surprise that any artist could compete with Albrecht Dürer so well. Much later Titian painted a larger composition of the subject (now in the National Gallery), perhaps to meet a demand for replicas. This was perhaps begun around 1543, but not completed until the 1560s; it was sent to Philip II of Spain in 1568. X-radiographs reveal that the gold coin in it was originally inscribed with "Ferrara".

== Context ==
The figure of the pharisee has been claimed as a self-portrait by Titian, who was in his late twenties at the time. The same claim has been made for several figures painted in narrative scenes by Titian, notably, and perhaps more convincingly, the severed head of John the Baptist in his Salome (Doria Pamphilj Gallery in Rome and other versions), which is very close in date to this painting, and where the head does not much resemble the one here. Both paintings are examples of narrative subjects drawing on Titian's skill as a portraitist, as well as forming part of a number of paintings using the Giorgionesque type of composition showing two or three tightly cropped half-length figures with their faces close together, heightening the drama of their interaction. Other examples of this type are Lucretia and her Husband and The Bravo, both now in Vienna, and The Lovers (Royal Collection).

== Provenance ==
The painting is part of the permanent collection of Gemäldegalerie Alte Meister in Dresden, Germany in the first floor. After WWII among many masterpieces of the gallery, it was taken by the Red Army to the Pushkin Museum in Moscow. The painting was badly damaged by water and was painstakingly restored by Russian painter Pavel Korin. Together with many others, in 1955 the painting was returned to Dresden, then in the DDR.

== In literature ==
The painting is referred to in George Eliot's Daniel Deronda (ch 40), when the young and vigorous Deronda meets the ill and prematurely aged Jewish scholar Mordecai: "I wish I could perpetuate those two faces", Eliot writes, "as Titian's 'Tribute Money' has perpetuated two types presenting another sort of contrast."

The painting plays a symbolic, thematic role in Julian Barnes's biographical novel The Noise of Time regarding the life of composer Dmitri Shostakovich.

== See also ==
- List of works by Titian
- The Tribute Money (Masaccio) – showing a different episode.
