= Salome (Titian, Rome) =

Painting by Titian in Rome

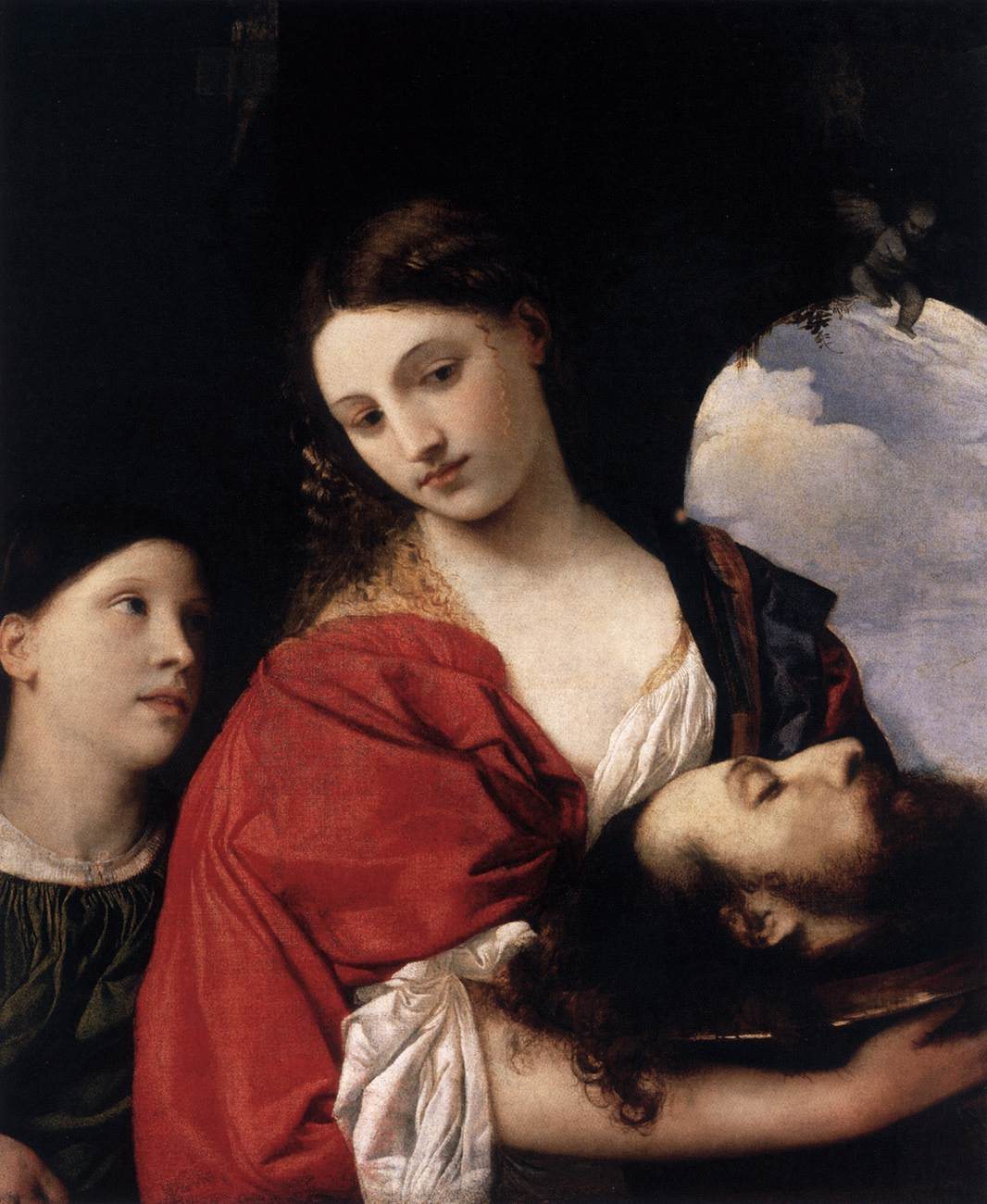
- Artist: Titian
- Year: c. 1515
- Medium: Oil on canvas
- Dimensions: 90 cm × 72 cm (35 in × 28 in)
- Location: Doria Pamphilj Gallery, Rome

Salome, or possibly Judith with the Head of Holofernes, is an oil painting which is an early work by the Venetian painter of the late Renaissance, Titian. It is usually thought to represent Salome with the head of John the Baptist. It is usually dated to around 1515 and is now in the Doria Pamphilj Gallery in Rome. Like other paintings of this subject, it has sometimes been considered to represent Judith with the head of Holofernes, the other biblical incident found in art showing a female and a severed male head. Historically, the main figure has also been called Herodias, the mother of Salome.

Sometimes attributed to Giorgione, the painting is now usually seen as one where Titian's personal style can be seen in development, with a "sense of physical proximity and involvement of the viewer", in which "expert handling of the malleable oil medium enabled the artist to evoke the sensation of softly spun hair upon creamy flesh".

Erwin Panofsky suggested the head of John the Baptist might be a self-portrait, and it is possible that Titian was alluding to his private life with the model, anticipating Cristofano Allori's, Judith with the Head of Holofernes (1613, Royal Collection, and other versions), where the severed head was a self-portrait and Judith and the maid portraits of his ex-mistress and her mother. The model here, allowing for a degree of idealization, has been said to be the same used in the Dresden Venus (Giorgione and Titian, c. 1510) and Venus and Cupid (c. 1510–1515). It has been said that around this time depictions of Salome moved from a passive to a more seductive figure.

This composition was copied many times, in at least some cases by Titian's workshop.

== Salome, Judith, or Herodias? ==
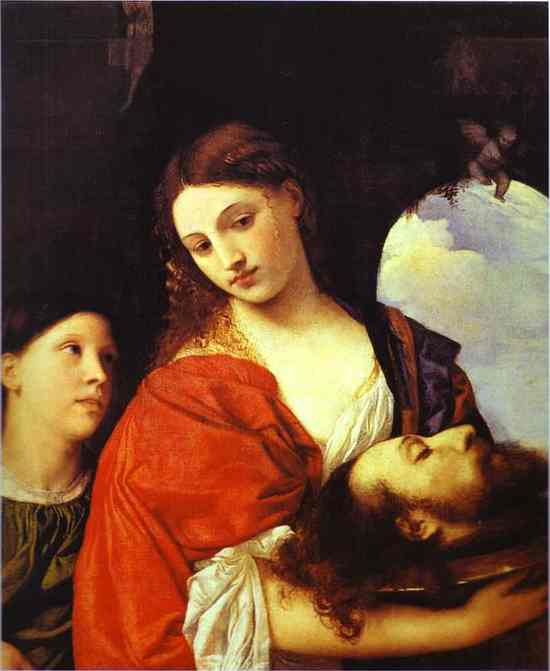
Lighter image, with clearer view of the background, cupid, and fittings

The possible provenance of the painting begins in 1533, with a Judith by Titian recorded in the collection of Alfonso I d'Este, Duke of Ferrara, a very important patron of Titian. No other surviving Titian painting seems to fit this record, so if it is not the painting now in Rome, it must be lost. In 1592 Duke Alfonso's granddaughter, Lucrezia d'Este (1535–1598) owned a painting described as a "Herodias" (Salome's mother). What is certainly the Doria Pamphilj painting belonged by 1603 to Cardinal Pietro Aldobrandini before passing to his niece Olimpia Aldobrandini, whose second husband was the ex-cardinal Camillo Pamphilj; since then it has passed by descent through the family. In the 18th century the painting was called a Herodias, but a number of foreign visitors who saw it record thinking the main figure to be Judith.

If the painting's main figure was Herodias, traditionally seen as the prime mover of the conspiracy to get John the Baptist executed, the younger woman next to her would be intended to represent her daughter Salome, here shown as a figure in thrall to her more glamorous mother. The identification as Herodias seems to have no recent supporters, but that as Judith does.

A medieval addition to the Salome legend held that, as well as her mother's hatred of John for his preaching against her, Salome was also motivated by a frustrated love for John, to which the cupid might refer. Her face is turned away from his head, but her eyes look back to it. Panofsky describes her as: "Meditative, sad and a little benumbed, she seems to recoil from the face of St. John which yet attracts her sidelong glances with irresistible force". Meanwhile, the maid "looks at the heroine with the eyes of a faithful dog who feels and shares his master's distress without comprehending its cause". Thus, in the pyramidal group of figures, the glances flow from the maid on the left, up to Salome at centre, and down to John at right, whose dead eyes are closed.

The use of erotic allure on male figures of power is the core of both stories, but to the church and Titian's contemporaries, Herodias and Salome were bad, but Judith a heroine. Both stories were part of the repertoire of the Power of Women topos, mainly a feature of German art in this period, but whose subjects were also depicted in Italy. The small Cupid at the top of the arch reinforces the eroticism of the treatment, suggesting either Salome's lust for John, (or Herod's implied attraction to Salome) or that of Holfernes for Judith, according to choice. It has also been suggested that the use of cupids on the keystone of arches was common in public buildings of the period in Venice, which "stresses the official nature of St. John's imprisonment and execution".

The presence of a maidservant is usual in depictions of Judith (following the Book of Judith, which mentions her), but not in those of Salome with the head of John the Baptist. On the other hand, the head on a dish is normally associated with Salome's story, and is mentioned in the gospel, while Judith often puts hers in a sack, or carries it by the hair, both also following the text of their story. A single lock of hair falling over the face was considered highly alluring, and associated with courtesans, perhaps suggesting Salome is indeed the subject, though Judith is described as using every effort to dress seductively.

The murky background at the left includes a fitting at the top, between the two women's heads, which is described as a lock by Panofsky, though it might be a hinge also. This marks the vertical edge of a zone with a slightly different tint, perhaps showing the transition from a door to a wall. What could be an iron bar, or door top, is to the left of the fitting. The Pasadena version also shows a fitting and change in colour. This suggests the paintings show the women leaving the prison where John was killed, to return with the head to the head to Herod's feast, a version of the story often shown in art, though not exactly following the gospel, in which a soldier presents the head on a dish to Herod, who gives it to Salome, who in turn gives it to her mother. The biblical text is very clear that Holofernes is assassinated in his tent in his camp, and the scene (rare in art) where Judith shows the head to the people of Bethulia happens at night inside the city gate, so the background of the painting is difficult to reconcile with a depiction of Judith.

== Attribution and date ==
As with other small Titians from the 1510s, the attribution has wavered over the centuries, beginning with Titian in early records, but (almost inevitably) becoming attributed to Giorgione by the 19th century, until Crowe and Cavalcaselle attributed it to il Pordenone. By the end of that century it was once again attributed by most to Titian, which has remained the usual view among experts.

The Norton Simon Museum version was attributed to Titian in sales in England between 1801 and 1859, but a sale in London in 1891 called it a Giorgione.

Though a date of about 1515 has long been the usual view, purely on stylistic grounds, Charles Hope has suggested about 1511. This is partly because of its relationship to Sebastiano del Piombo's Salome of 1510 (National Gallery), where the setting also moves from dark at the left to light at the right. This has also been regarded by some as a "Judith".

== Context ==
The painting relates to two different types of painting found in Venetian painting in the years dominated by Giorgione, including his posthumous influence. The first is a number of Venetian paintings of the 1510s showing two or three half-length figures with heads close together, often with their expressions and interactions enigmatic. Many of these are "Giorgionesque" genre or tronie subjects where the subjects are anonymous. But Titian's Lucretia and her Husband shows a specific subject, even if views differ as to the point in the story shown. His Bravo may have a specific subject; both of these are now in Vienna. The Lovers (Royal Collection) probably does not. His Tribute Money (Dresden, c. 1516) has a clear subject, also from the New Testament.

The other type it relates to is Titian's series of belle donne half-length female figures from the mid-1510s, which also includes Lucretia and her Husband, as well as the single figures of Flora at the Uffizi, the Woman with a Mirror at the Louvre, the Violante and Vanity in Munich. Most of these have the appearance of portraits, and were sometimes regarded as contemporaries as portraits of leading Venetian courtesans, but are best thought of as idealized figures of beautiful women which may only loosely reflect any individual. This type was more long-lived in Venetian painting, and made by many other artists; Palma Vecchio for one made a speciality of them.

== Versions ==
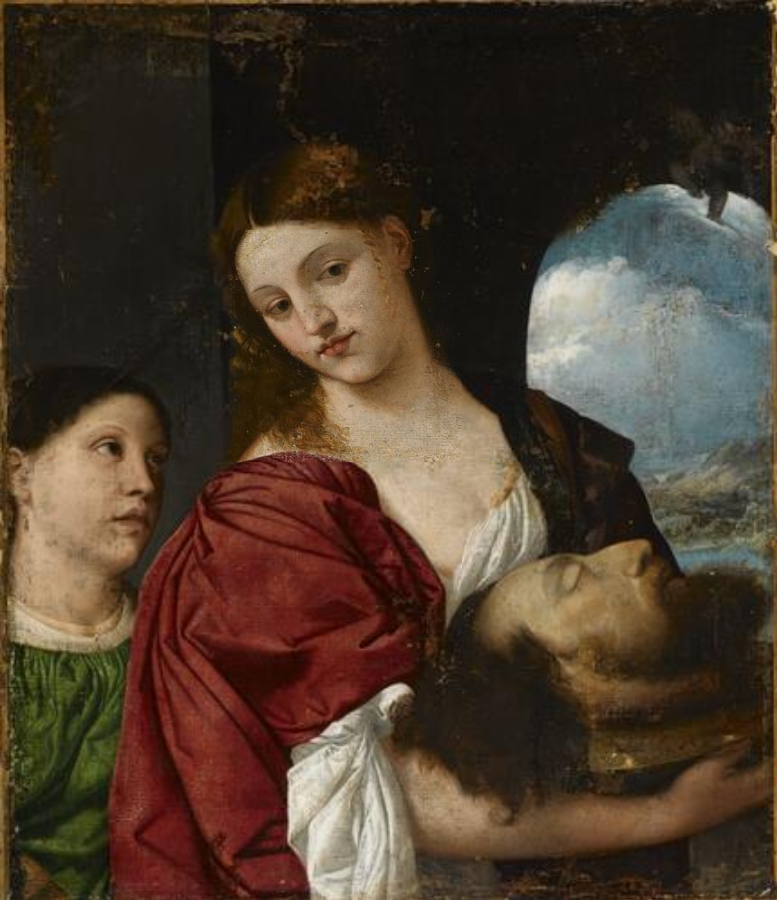
Version in the Norton Simon Museum (1550s)

There are several early repetitions that might be by Titian or his workshop, or partly by both. A version in the Norton Simon Museum, Pasadena has been considered to be the best of the workshop versions. It was also in the Doria Pamphilj collection from its ownership by Cardinal Aldobrandini at the start of the 17th century to its sale 1797–98 during the French revolutionary invasion of Italy, when much Italian art was sold, mostly to the English, in anticipation of the French looting it otherwise. William Young Ottley was the initial purchaser, who took it to London and sold it in 1801.

Another version that was part of the collections of Prince Salviati, Christina of Sweden and of Prince Odescalchi is now owned by the real estate magnate Luke Brugnara. That Salome was also attributed to il Pordenone and Giorgione, and finally to Titian in the late 19th century; now regarded as a workshop version.

== Other compositions of Salome and Judith ==
Titian painted Salome in at least one later composition, from the 1550s, with the dish holding the head held above her head (Prado), possibly using his daughter Lavinia as the model. Another composition has recently resurfaced, which dates from the 1560s; as of 2012, this is in the National Museum of Western Art, Tokyo.

About 1570 Titian painted an undoubted Judith with the Head of Holofernes (Detroit Institute of Arts).
