= Venus and Cupid (sculpture) =

Sculpture in Morecambe, UK, by Shane A. Johnstone

Coordinates: 54°05′04″N 2°49′59″W

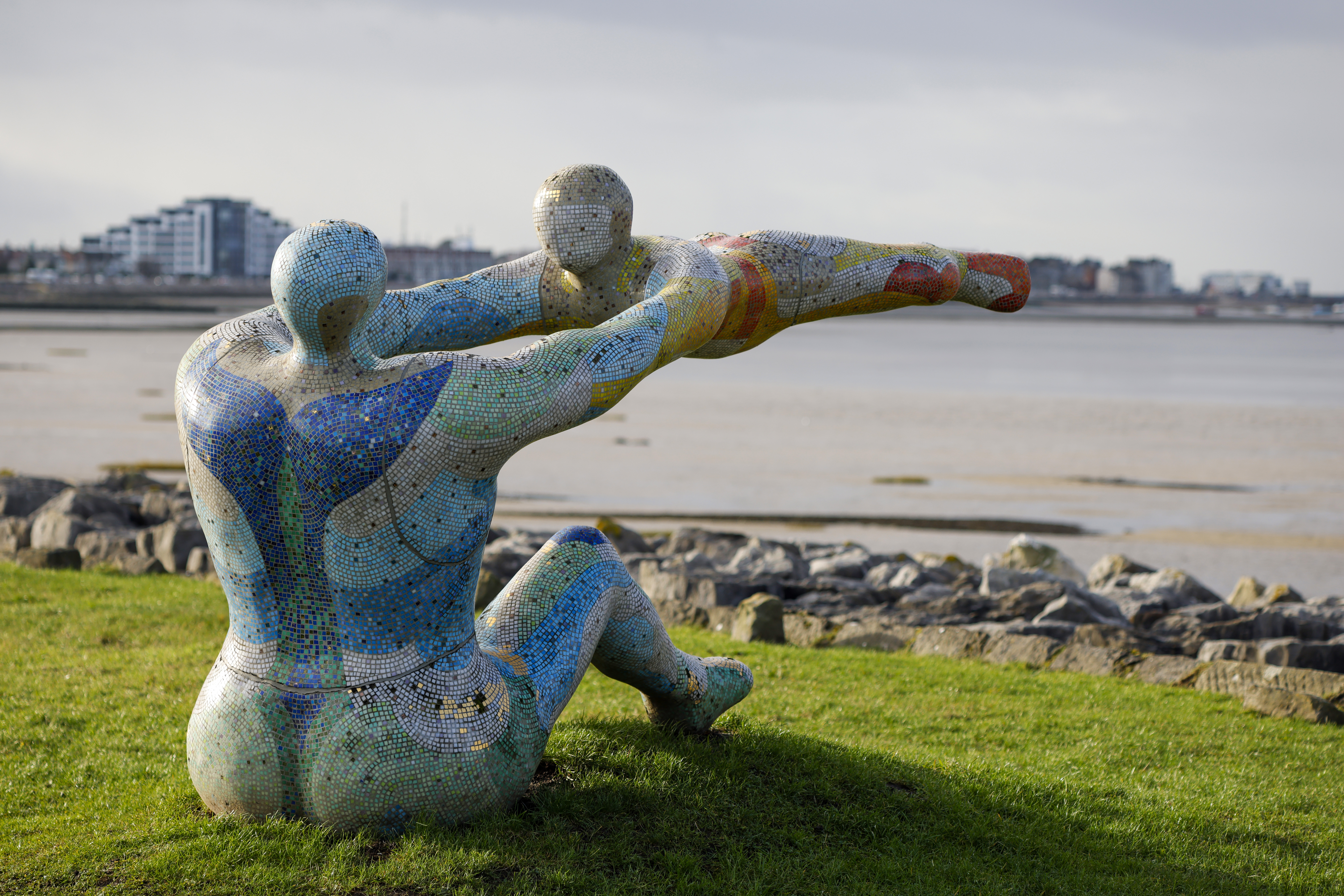
The sculpture seen in 2023, showing the repairs made with gold leaf

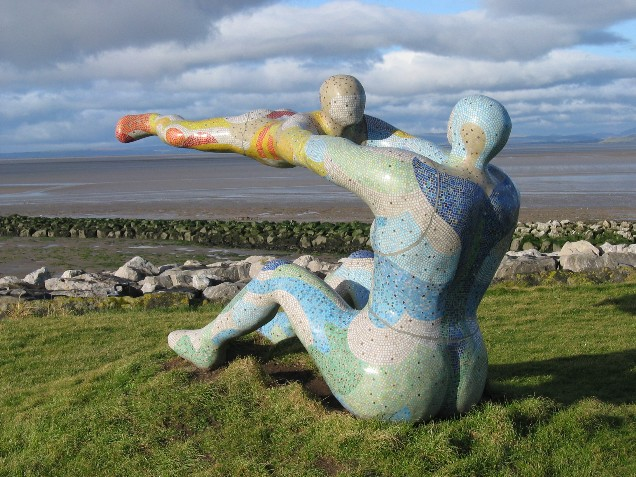
The sculpture, seen in 2007

Love, The Most Beautiful Of Absolute Disasters, popularly known as Venus and Cupid is a sculpture by Shane A. Johnstone which stands on a slight promontory beside Morecambe Bay on the eastern approach to Morecambe, Lancashire, England.

== The sculpture ==
The sculpture depicts a seated woman, facing out to sea, holding the hands of a child who is suspended in the air extending horizontally from her arms, as if being swung round. It is covered in multicoloured mosaic. It was originally intended for St George's Quay in Lancaster.

It was erected in 2005 on Scalestone Point, site of a former gun emplacement, between the coast road and the sea, and commemorates the 24 cockle-pickers who died in the bay in 2004.

In 2011 the artist threatened to destroy the sculpture because the local council was not prepared to pay for its insurance and upkeep. The Venus & Cupid Arts Trust was formed to save the sculpture and to care for other public art in Morecambe. The trust is responsible for the sculpture's insurance, maintenance and repairs.

The sculpture was damaged by frost in the winter of 2017–2018, which caused some of the mosaic tiles to fall off. It was moved temporarily into the Arndale Centre in Morecambe in November 2018, for repair, and was returned to the sea front in June 2019. The sculptor, Shane Johnstone, used the Japanese technique of kintsugi, replacing the missing tiles with gold leaf to celebrate the repair rather than attempting to hide it. The repair cost over £4,000, including the cost of moving the sculpture.

== The artist ==
Shane Johnstone describes himself as "originally a fairground artist in Blackpool and Morecambe". His work includes murals, mosaic work, sculpture and stained glass and he has been involved in many community art projects, including a 2015 piece of public art in Morecambe's West End, and the renovation of Ulverston's statue of Laurel and Hardy. Johnstone has said of Venus and Cupid: "People love it. There’s dozens of sculptures along the promenade and two that get talked about – Eric Morecambe and my sculpture".
