= Venus and Cupid (Titian) =

Painting by Titian in the Wallace Collection

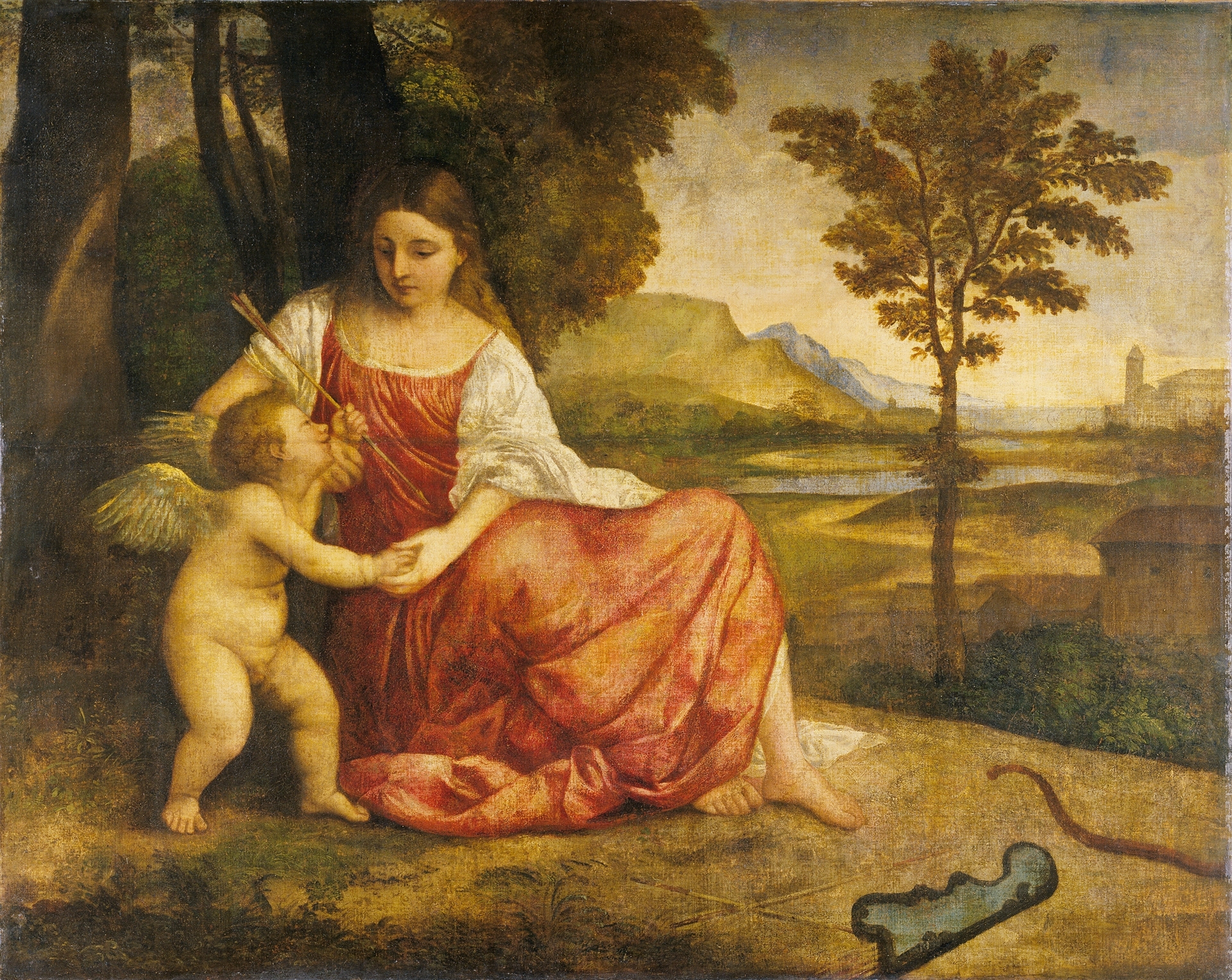
Venus and Cupid, 1510–1515 (111 x 139 cm; 43.7 x 54.7 in)

Venus and Cupid is an oil on canvas painting by Titian, from 1510-1515. It is held now in the Wallace Collection, in London. It is dated by the model for Venus, who also appeared in other 1510s works by the artist such as his Salome (Galleria Doria-Pamphilj).

== Provenance ==
It was first recorded in the 18th century in the inventories of the Orleans Collection, where it was misattributed to Giorgione. It passed through the hands of several British collectors such as John Howard, 15th Earl of Suffolk, from 1802 to 1810, and John Rushout, 2nd Baron Northwick, from 1834 to 1838, before being bought by Richard Seymour-Conway, 4th Marquess of Hertford, in 1859, bringing it to its present home. It has been attributed to Titian or perhaps Palma Vecchio or Francesco Vecellio since the 19th century.
