= Laura (Giorgione) =

1506 painting by Giorgione

Portrait of a Young Bride (Laura)
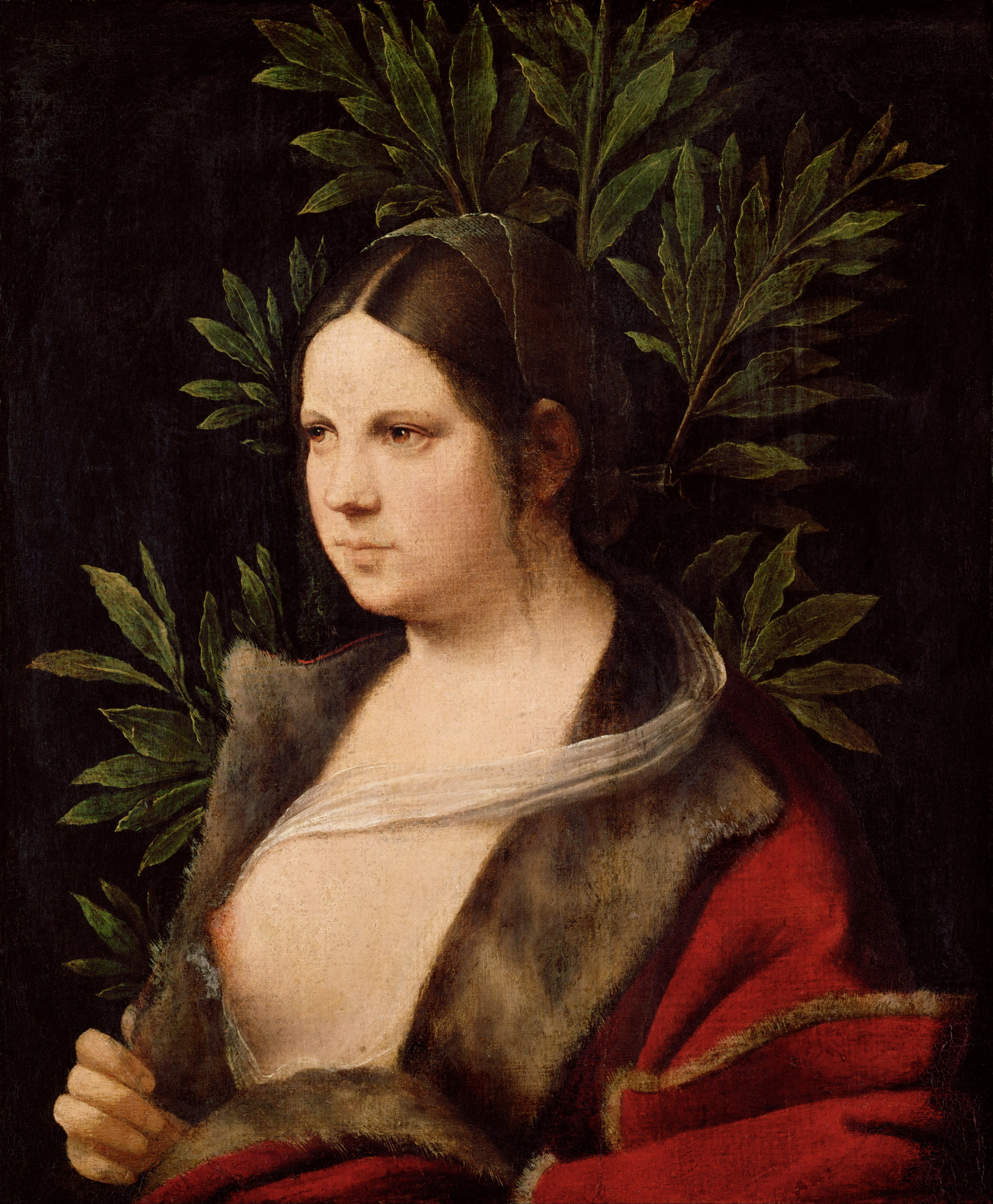
- Artist: Giorgione
- Year: 1506
- Type: Oil on canvas transferred from panel
- Dimensions: 41 cm × 33.5 cm (16 in × 13.2 in)
- Location: Kunsthistorisches Museum, Vienna

Laura, sometimes known as Portrait of a Young Bride, is a 1506 oil on canvas painting by the Italian Renaissance master Giorgione. It is the only known painting of the author that was signed and dated by him. This work marked Giorgione's abandonment of Giovanni Bellini's models to embrace a Leonardesque style. It hangs in the Kunsthistorisches Museum in Vienna, Austria.

== Painting ==
=== Subject ===
The portrait depicts a young woman as a bride. It was commissioned by a man named Giacomo, whose name is inscribed on the back of the painting. The unknown woman in the painting is called Laura because of the laurel branches depicted in the background of the portrait.

The Kunsthistorisches Museum identifies the subject as Laura di Noves., the wife of Count Hugues de Sade. She is thought to be the subject of Petrarch's Laura poems, although this is unproven. However, since Laura is a very common name, the identity of the painting has not been verified as fact.

Alternatively, the figure might show a courtesan— certainly many of the paintings in the Venetian tradition the Laura inspired were of figures to be read as courtesans, often posing as a mythological figure or the personification of an abstract quality.

It is also assumed that the model of this portrait was also a model for Giorgione's The Tempest.

=== Description ===
The portrait shows a young dark-haired woman wearing a fur-trimmed red cloak. She holds the cloak slightly open, exposing her right breast. A thin white veil is wrapped over the woman's hair and falls over her right shoulder. Against the dark background of the portrait are branches of laurel leaves, framing the woman.

The subject of the painting looks away from the artist. Her calm, yet intense gaze falls somewhere beyond the viewer, suggesting her interest lies elsewhere. Her hair is held back modestly, yet a single strand falls loose along her face, creating a sense of eroticism in the painting. The subject's enigmatic nature draws the viewer in, creating an uncertain view of her intentions and her identity.

An inscription on the reverse, accepted as early 16th-century, identifies Giorgione as the painter and provides the date, making this the only work by the artist bearing a reliable date. Translated from Italian, it reads: “[…] on 1 June 1506, this was made by the hand of the master Giorgio da Castelfranco, the colleague of master Vincenzo Catena, at the instigation of Mr. Giacomo.”

The painting is an oil on canvas over spruce wood. Several alterations have been made to the painting's shape over the years. It was first trimmed into an oval shape, then later returned to its original rectangular shape. The trimming of this portrait creates a greater sense of immediacy than was originally depicted by the artist.

=== Composition ===
This painting marks Giorgione's transition from the style of Giovanni Bellini to taking inspiration from the work of Leonardo da Vinci. The use of muted coloring and shading of sfumato is inspired by da Vinci's works. The softening of the contours around the face of the woman is also influenced by da Vinci, creating a more intimate, enigmatic portrait.

Behind the young woman is a branch of laurel (Laurus), a symbol of chastity or of poets, and carrying the nuptial veil. The gesture of opening the fur mantle uncovers the bosom. This may indicate fecundity (and, therefore, maternity) as an offer of love and a marriage blessed with children. As the laurel symbolized virtue, so the visible breast could symbolize the bride's conjugal fidelity.

The laurel was considered a symbol of virtue, as seen in Lorenzo de' Medici's "impresa", where it was accompanied by the motto: "Ita ut virtus". The veil wound about her shoulders and upper body is a bridal veil, and her bared right breast alludes to the proverbial chastity of the Amazons, who, according to antique legend, tolerated men only as a means of sexual reproduction, not, however, as a means of sexual gratification. Since contemporary morality permitted sexual reproduction only within the institution of marriage, the allusion to the Amazons implied a wife's commitment to conjugal fidelity.

It is only from the prudish perspective of the 19th or early 20th century that the baring of a breast would be viewed as meretricious. In the 16th century, nudity did not provoke disapproval, but was shown publicly and uninhibitedly. This painting, too, was publicly shown, probably by a proud noble who wished to celebrate his bride's attractiveness - her full build was entirely in keeping with contemporary Venetian ideals of beauty - as well as her virtue and chastity.

== Historical background ==
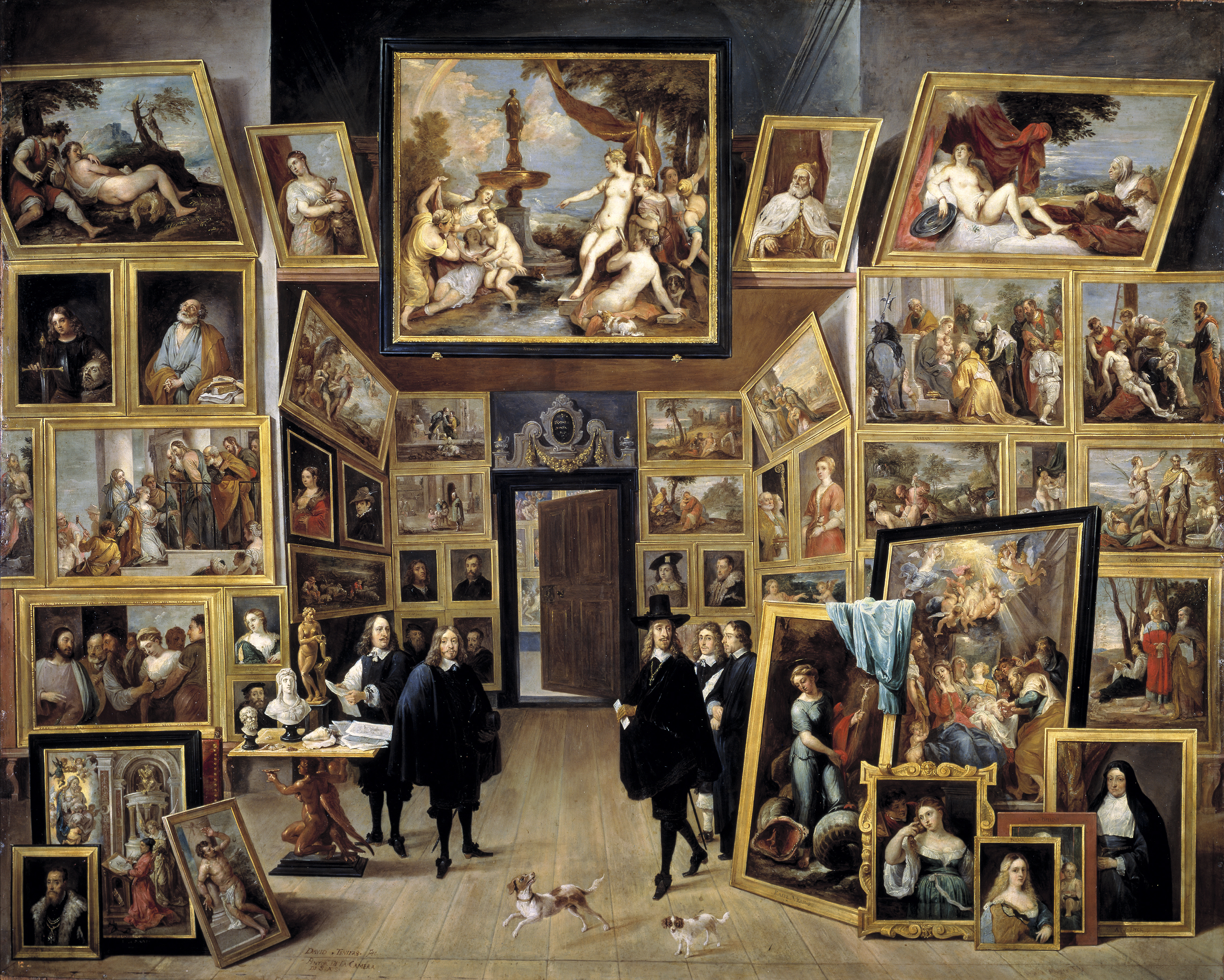
This painting can be seen hanging on the wall of the Archduke's gallery in the 1640s

The inscription on the back of the painting dates it to 1 June 1506. The attribution of this painting is uncontroversial because it has a long and well-documented provenance.

It was in the collection of the Venetian collector Bartolomeo della Nave and subsequently was purchased by Duke of Hamilton, and after his execution, by the Archduke Leopold Wilhelm of Austria, which is how it came into the museum's collection.
