= Noli me tangere (Titian) =

C. 1514 painting by Titian

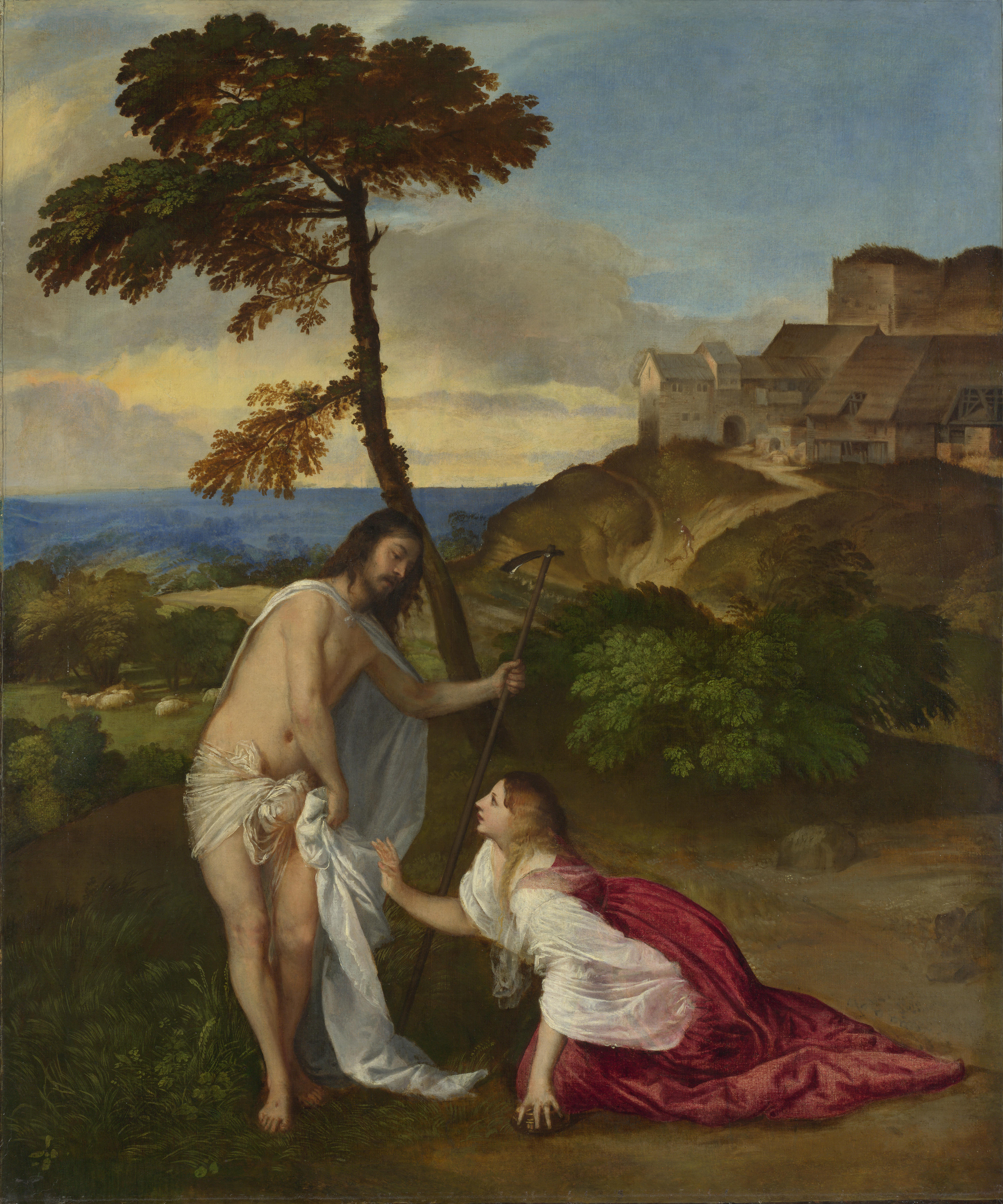
- Artist: Titian
- Year: c. 1514
- Medium: oil on canvas
- Dimensions: 110.5 cm × 91.9 cm (43.5 in × 36.2 in)
- Location: National Gallery, London

Noli me tangere (Latin for Don't touch me or Stop touching me) is a c. 1514 painting by Titian of the Noli me tangere episode in St John's Gospel. The painting, depicting Jesus and Mary Magdalene soon after the resurrection, is in oil on canvas and since 1856 has been in the collection of the National Gallery in London.

== See also ==
- List of works by Titian
