= Flora (Titian) =

1515 painting by Titian

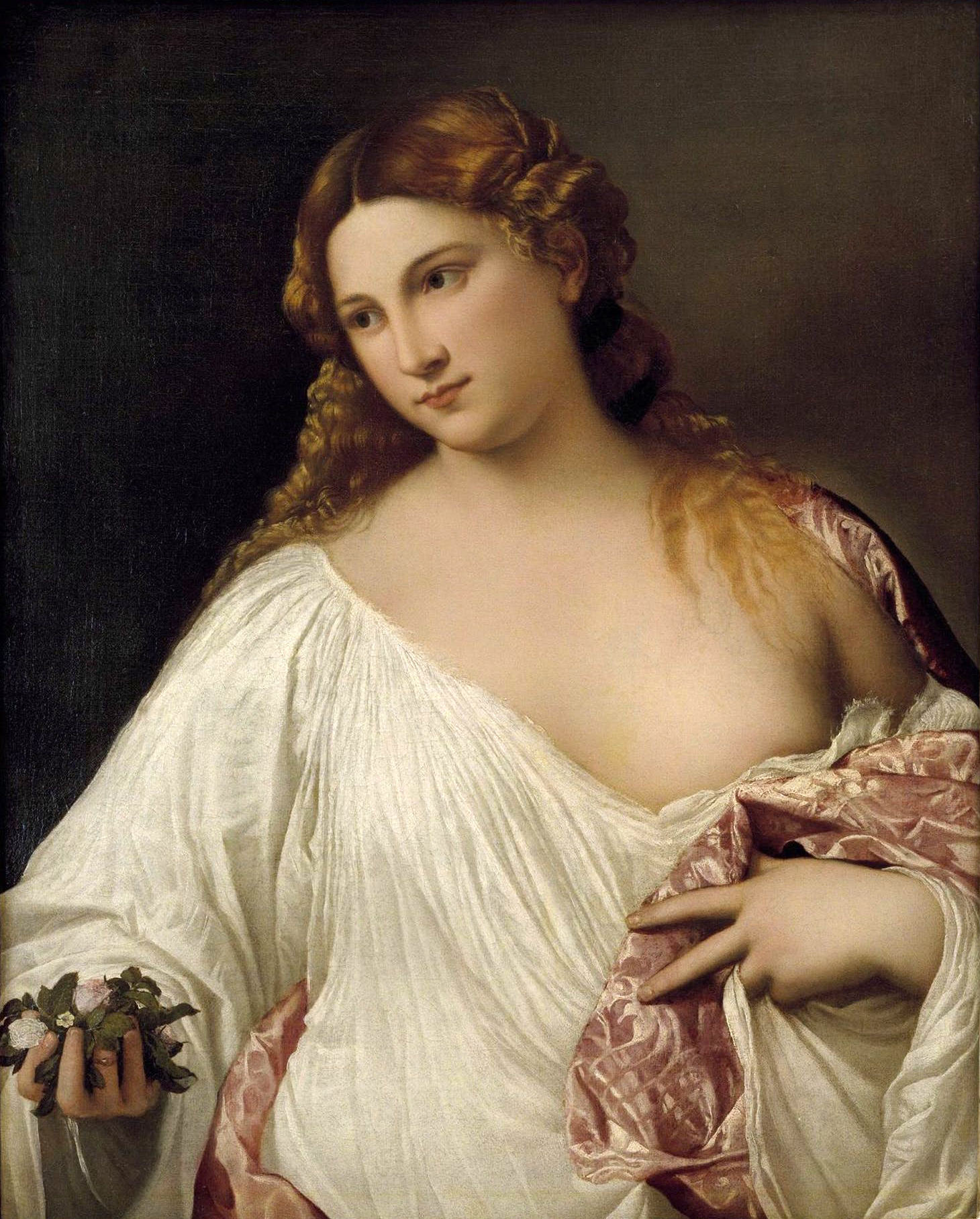
- Artist: Titian
- Year: c. 1515
- Medium: Oil on canvas
- Dimensions: 79.7 cm × 63.5 cm (31.4 in × 25.0 in)
- Location: Uffizi Gallery; Florence

Flora is an oil painting by Italian late Renaissance painter Titian, dated to around 1515 and now held at the Uffizi Gallery in Florence.

== History ==
The work was reproduced in numerous 16th century etchings. Later, it followed an unclear series of changes of hands at Brussels and Vienna. In the 17th century, it was sold by the Spanish ambassador at Amsterdam to Archduke Leopold Wilhelm of Austria and was cited by Rembrandt in his Saskia Dressing as Flora of London and in two portraits in Dresden and New York. Later included in the Kunsthistorisches Museum of Vienna, it was one of the works exchanged with the Uffizi.

In the 18th century, it was erroneously attributed to Palma the Elder.

== Description ==
It portrays an idealized beautiful woman, a model established in the Venetian school by Titian's master Giorgione with his Laura. Her left hand holds a pink-shaded mantle, and her right holds a handful of flowers and leaves.

The woman was portrayed by Titian in numerous other works of the period, including the Woman at the Mirror, the Vanity, Salome and Violante, as well as some Holy Conversations. The meaning of the painting is disputed: some, basing for example to inscriptions added to the 16th century reproductions, identifies the woman as a courtesan; other consider it a symbol of nuptial love, although her dress is not a dressing one. The identification with Flora, the ancient goddess of Spring and vegetation, derives from the presence of Spring flowers in her hands.

== See also ==
- List of works by Titian
