= Woman with a Mirror =

C. 1515 painting by Titian

- Artist: Titian
- Year: c. 1515
- Medium: oil on canvas
- Dimensions: 99 cm × 76 cm (39 in × 30 in)
- Location: Musée du Louvre, Paris

Woman with a Mirror (French: La Femme au miroir) is an oil on canvas painting by Titian, dated to c. 1515. Also known as Woman at Her Toilet, it is held in the Musée du Louvre, in Paris.

== History ==
It is known to have been in the Gonzaga family's collection in Mantua from which it was bought by Charles I of England. After Charles' execution, it was sold off and purchased by Louis XIV of France for the Palace of Versailles.

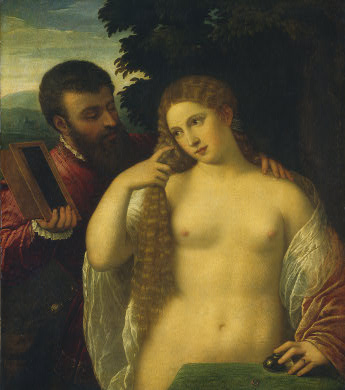
The Washington variant, usually ascribed to Titian's studio.

Several attempts have been made to identify the main female figure – these have included Titian's lover, Alfonso I d'Este's lover Laura Dianti, or Federico Gonzaga's lover Isabella Boschetti. None of these theories fit the date ascribed to the painting through analysis of its style, which is 1512–15, when the courts of Mantua and Ferrara were first becoming interested in Titian.

Dianti was painted by Titian in a portrait of 1523. She is probably just a model who appears in other paintings – the same woman with frizzy reddish blonde hair appears in a series of paintings from around the same time (including the Flora at the Uffizi, the Vanity in Munich, the Salome in the Galleria Doria Pamphilj, the Violante and the Young woman in a black dress in Vienna) as well as several Madonnas and the clothed figure in Sacred and Profane Love. As happened with the 'Bella' series, it was still customary for the artist's workshop to create similar works with variations from the same studies if not from the same cartoon.

Many versions of the work are known, equal in quality to the original but not as large. The best are in the MNAC in Barcelona, the gallery of Prague Castle, and the National Gallery of Art in Washington.

== Description and style ==
A woman of idealized beauty overlooks a parapet and touches a bottle placed on it (which contains, perhaps, a perfume or ointment). With her right hand, she caresses her hair. A man behind her lifts a mirror to show the woman from behind and the window that illuminates the room – his presence is linked to the Renaissance Paragone debates over artistic skill. According to Paragone ideals, painting, like sculpture, should offer multiple perspectives on its subject. The man holds a second mirror, visible in profile, in which the woman gazes at herself while she dresses.

Woman with a Mirror demonstrates a harmony of color and composition typical of the young Titian, who exalted the beauty, even sensuality, of his subjects. Women of the era wore loose hair only in the intimacy of the home, which confers to the painting an erotic character that prevails over the other elements of the vanitas theme (the bottle of ointment, the play of the mirrors).

== See also ==
- List of works by Titian

== Bibliography ==
- Valcanover, Francesco (1969). L'opera completa di Tiziano (in Italian). Milan: Rizzoli.
- Pericolo, Lorenzo (2009). "Love in the Mirror: A Comparative reading of Titian's Woman at Her Toilet and Caravaggio's Conversion of Mary Magdalene". I Tatti Studies in the Italian Renaissance. 12: 149–179. doi:10.1086/its.12.27809574. ISSN 0393-5949. JSTOR 27809574. S2CID 190686977.
