= Young Woman in a Black Dress =

Painting by Titian

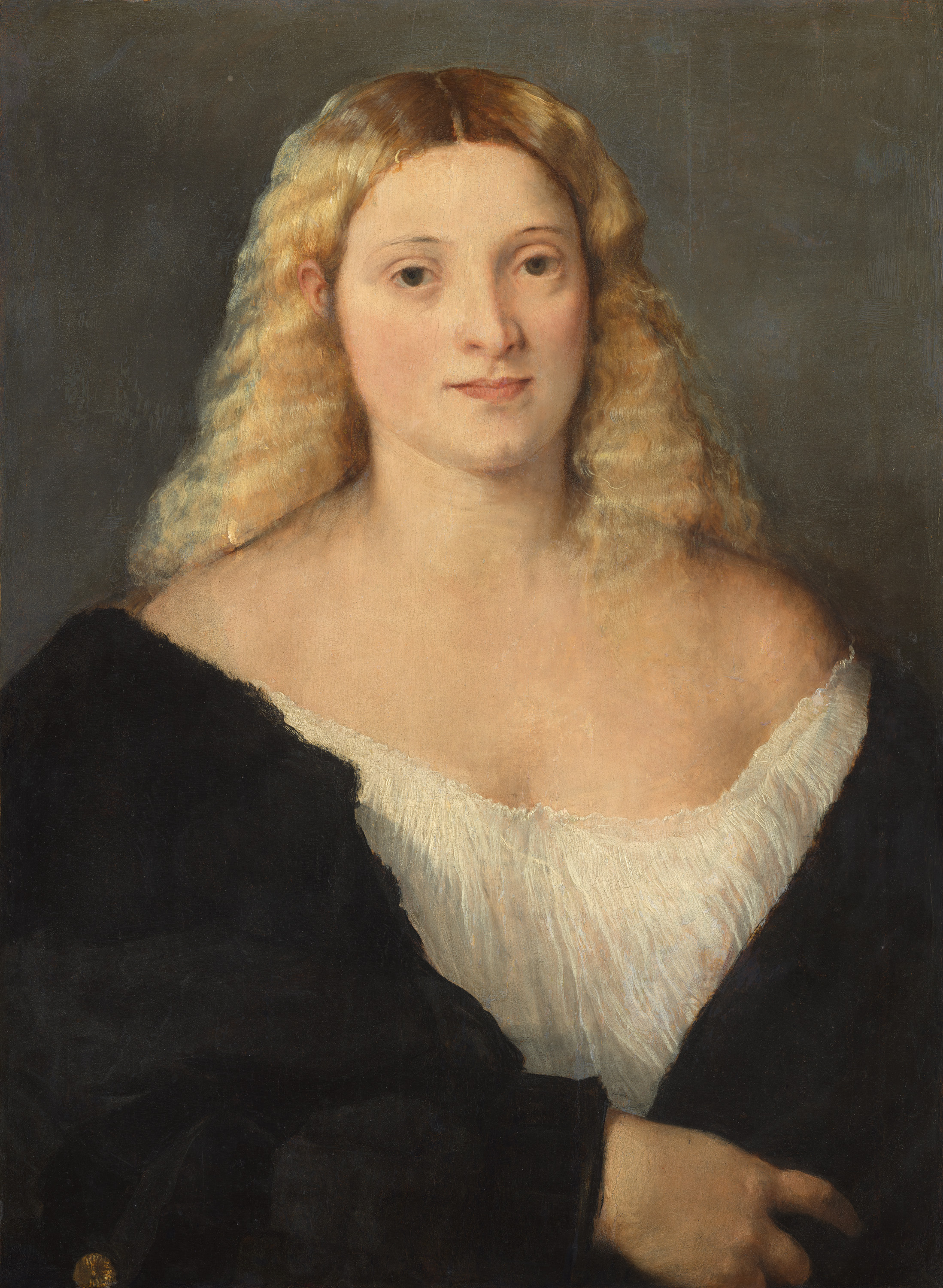
- Artist: Titian
- Year: c. 1520
- Medium: Oil on panel
- Dimensions: 59.5 cm × 44.5 cm (23.4 in × 17.5 in)
- Location: Kunsthistorisches Museum; Vienna

Young Woman in a Black Dress is an oil painting by Titian, dating to c. 1520. It is held at the Kunsthistorisches Museum, in Vienna. It was later misattributed to Palma il Vecchio, then to Giovanni Cariani, until Roberto Longhi reattributed it as by Titian, which is now the critical consensus.

== Description ==
It depicts a woman half-length, facing the viewer, with her torso slightly twisted to give a sense of movement. One hand holds her black dress over her white shift, with a generous cleavage. The woman's physical type recurs in several other works by the artist, such as Flora and Woman with a Mirror - she may have been Titian's mistress, or simply a recurring model.

== See also ==
- List of works by Titian
