= Vanity (Titian) =

1515 painting by Titian

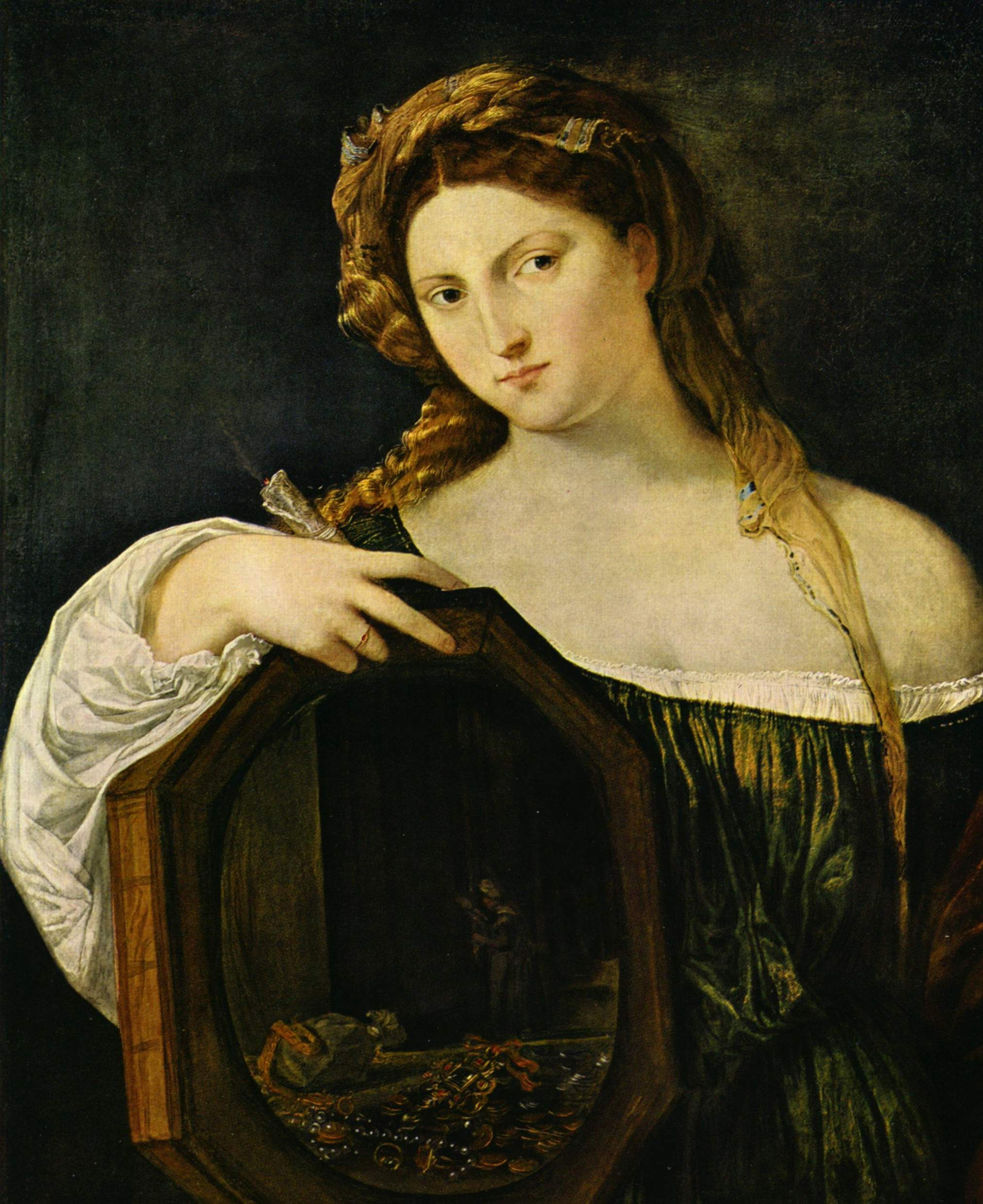
- Artist: Titian
- Year: c. 1515
- Medium: Oil on canvas
- Dimensions: 97 cm × 81.2 cm (38 in × 32.0 in)
- Location: Alte Pinakothek; Munich

Vanity is an oil painting by the Italian late Renaissance painter Titian, dated to around 1515 and now held at the Alte Pinakothek in Munich, Germany.

== History ==
The work was perhaps in Emperor Rudolf II's gallery in Prague, before becoming part of that of the Electors of Bavaria. It has part of the Munich museum's collection since 1884. The first mention dates to 1748, as a work by Francesco Salviati. It was later attributed to Palma the Elder, Giorgione, il Pordenone and finally Titian.

Radio analysis has proved the presence of workshop additions (in particular to the mirror) above an original, probably by Titian, based on the Woman at the Mirror.

== Description ==
The painting portrays an idealized beautiful woman, a model established in the Venetian school by Titian's master Giorgione with his Laura. She holds an oval mirror with a frame, which reflects some jewels and a maid who is searching in a case.

The woman was portrayed by Titian in numerous other works of the period, including the Woman at the Mirror, Salome and Flora, as well as some Holy Conversations.
