= Bartolomeo della Nave =

Venetian merchant and art collector

- Born: Venice
- Died: 1636; Venice

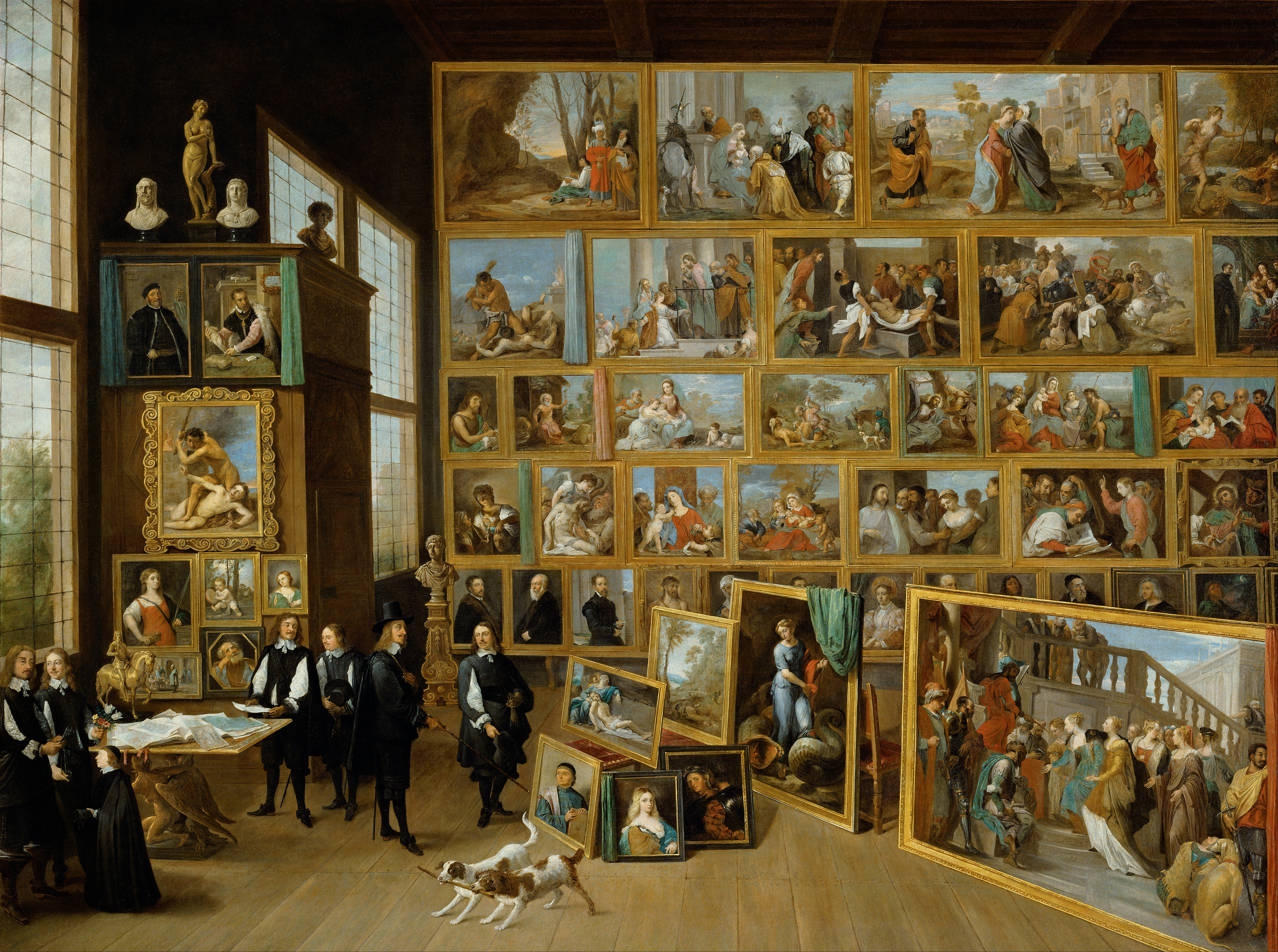
Many of della Nave's pictures are in this view of the collection of Archduke Leopold Wilhelm of Austria in the 1650s

Bartolomeo della Nave (? – 1636) was a Venetian merchant and art collector.

Della Nave was born in Venice and acquired a large art collection, that later was spread to prominent collections. Many of the artworks in his collection are known from an inventory dated 1636, which is often also assumed to be his year of death; with others this is uncertain, as they were bought in Venice for Hamilton, but their previous ownership by della Nave is only a strong presumption. Many of the paintings in his collection are still together today and form a part of the collection of the Kunsthistorisches Museum in Vienna. Their provenance records show "1636 Slg. Bartolomeo della Nave, Venedig; 1638-1649 Slg. Hamilton; Slg. Leopold Wilhelm", whereby the intermediary owners are shown to be James Hamilton, 1st Duke of Hamilton (d. 1649) and the Archduke Leopold Wilhelm of Austria (d. 1662).

Most of della Nave's collection was bought for Hamilton (then still a Marquess) in 1636–38; he was one of the great collectors of the period in Britain. Hamilton's brother-in-law, Basil Feilding, 2nd Earl of Denbigh (as he later became) was English ambassador to Venice, and helped to arrange the purchase. Hamilton, who was a Royalist commander in the English Civil War, was executed in 1649 after losing the Battle of Preston to Oliver Cromwell. Most of his collection was bought that year by Archduke Leopold Wilhelm of Austria, Governor of the Spanish Netherlands from 1647 to 1656. Many can be seen in the gallery paintings of his collection by David Teniers the Younger, in reduced copies by him, and in Theatrum Pictorium, the printed catalogue of the best Italian paintings, with engravings after the Teniers copies. At his death in 1662 Archduke Leopold bequeathed his collection to his nephew, the Emperor Leopold I. The imperial collection of paintings mostly reached the Kunsthistorisches Museum by stages, at a range of dates.

One painting that did not reach Vienna was The Death of Actaeon by Titian (National Gallery, London), which the archduke gave to Queen Christina of Sweden about 1656, when she was staying in Antwerp.

The collection included many portraits by Titian and others, but none of the sitters have been identified as Della Nave himself.
