= Gallery of Archduke Leopold Wilhelm in Brussels =

Gallery of Archduke Leopold Wilhelm in Brussels may refer to one of several gallery paintings by David Teniers the Younger:

- Archduke Leopold Wilhelm in his Painting Gallery in Brussels (Prado), 1651
- Gallery of Archduke Leopold Wilhelm in Brussels (Vienna), 1651
- Gallery of Archduke Leopold Wilhelm in Brussels (Brussels), 1651
- Gallery of Archduke Leopold Wilhelm in Brussels (Petworth), 1651
- Gallery of Archduke Leopold Wilhelm in Brussels (Galdiano), 1653
- Gallery of Archduke Leopold Wilhelm in Brussels (Rothschild), 1653
- Gallery of Archduke Leopold Wilhelm in Brussels (Schleissheim), mid-1600s
