= List of works in the Palatine Gallery =

Works in the Palatine Gallery at the Palazzo Pitti in Florence, Italy include:

- Raphael, Madonna of the Grand Duke
- Raphael, The Madonna of the Chair
- Raphael, Portrait of Pope Leo X and two Cardinals
- Raphael, companion portraits of Agnolo Doni and his wife, Maddelena Doni, for whom Michelangelo's Doni Tondo was commissioned.
- Andrea del Sarto, The Young John the Baptist
- Andrea del Sarto, Disputation on the Holy Trinity
- Sebastiano del Piombo, Martyrdom of St Agatha
- Titian, Mary Magdalene
- Titian, Portrait of Pietro Aretino
- Titian, Portrait of an Englishman, perhaps a member of the Howard family, (also known as The Man with Blue Eyes).
- Titian, Penitent Magdalene
- Murillo, Madonna and Child
- Rubens, a group portrait known as The Four Philosophers
- Rubens, Consequences of War
- Caravaggio, The Sleeping Cupid
- Artemisia Gentileschi, Judith
- Anthony van Dyck, Portrait of Cardinal Guido Bentivoglio
- Velázquez, Philip IV of Spain on Horseback
