= Gallery of Archduke Leopold Wilhelm in Brussels (Rothschild) =

Painting by David Teniers the Younger

Archduke Leopold Wilhelm in his Gallery in Brussels
- The Art Collection of Archduke Leopold Wilhelm in Brussels
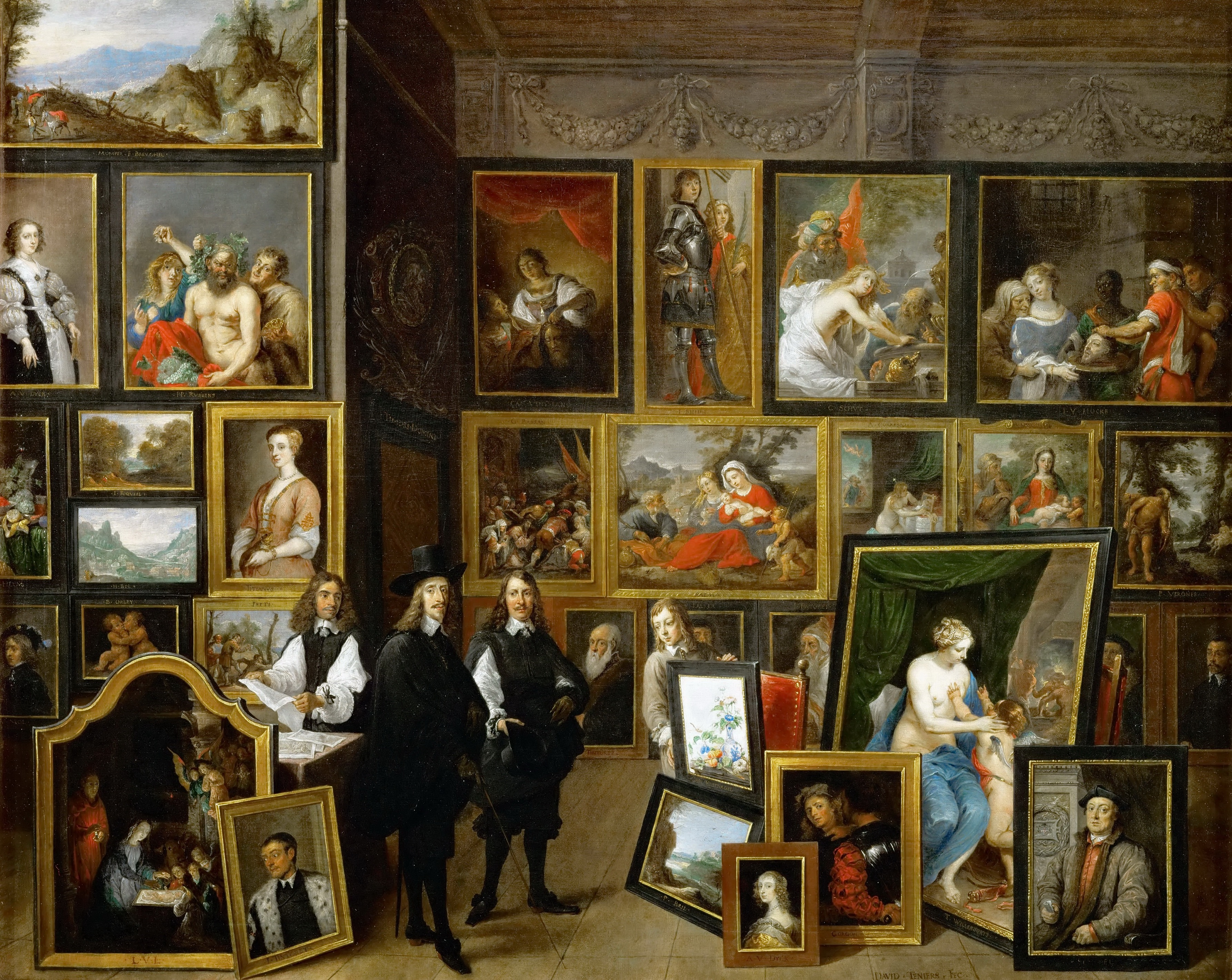
- Artist: David Teniers the Younger
- Year: 1653
- Dimensions: 70.9 cm (27.9 in) × 87.6 cm (34.5 in)
- Location: private collection, Kunsthistorisches Museum

Archduke Leopold Wilhelm and the artist in the archducal picture gallery in Brussels is a 1653 painting of Archduke Leopold Wilhelm's Italian art collection by the Flemish Baroque painter David Teniers the Younger. It is now held in a private collection, but it was previously owned by the Rothschild family, from whom it was taken in World War II and placed in the Kunsthistorisches Museum where it stayed for 50 years until restitution in 1999.

The painting portrays the Archduke as a connoisseur, surrounded by friends as they admire a collection of paintings. Teniers himself is depicted holding his hat, attentively listening to his patron, who gestures with his cane towards newly acquired pieces. The artworks are displayed in orderly rows along the walls of an L-shaped room, while a group of men stands before a doorway inscribed with "TIMORE DOMINI" above a sculpted portrait of the Archduke. In the foreground, another set of paintings leans against chairs, awaiting inspection.

This painting is dated 1653 and was painted after earlier, larger versions that David Teniers the Younger prepared to document the Archduke's collection before he employed 12 engravers to publish his Theatrum Pictorium, considered the "first illustrated art catalog". He published this book of engravings after the Archduke had moved to Austria and taken his collection with him. It was published in Antwerp in 1659 and again in 1673. The most impressive of these gallery paintings was the large version on copper in the Museo del Prado with a different selection of paintings. That was produced as a gift from the archduke to Philip IV of Spain.

== Paintings depicted ==
Many of the recognizable paintings in the collection, not all of which were included in the Italian catalog prepared by Teniers, are still in the Viennese collection. This copy was probably produced in tandem with a similar version in the Museo Lázaro Galdiano as a gift.

image	article	painter	year	collection	inventory nr.	catalog code
	Landscape	Joos de Momper and Jan Brueghel the Elder				
	Lady with a Fan	Anthony van Dyck		National Gallery of Art	1957.14.1	
	Drunken Silenus	Rubens	1609	Durazzo Pallavicini		
	Judith with the head of Holofernes	Carlo Saraceni	1613	Kunsthistorisches Museum	GG_41	39
	St George	Antonello da Messina (copy by David Teniers the Younger)		private collection		
	Susanna and the Elders	Cornelis Schut	1650	Royal Museums of Fine Arts of Belgium		
	Salome receives the head of John the Baptist					
	Still-Life with a Peeled Lemon	Jan Davidsz. de Heem	1650s	Louvre	INV 1320	
	Landscape	I Foqveel (Jacques Fouquier?)				
	Landscape	Hans Bol				
	Lady with an Ermine	Titian (copy by David Teniers the Younger)				94
	Christ Carrying the Cross meets with Veronica	Girolamo da Ponte		Kunsthistorisches Museum	GG 1869	
	Holy Family with St. John	Palma Vecchio	1520	Uffizi	950	
	Toilet of Venus	David Teniers the Younger	1655	Philadelphia Museum of Art	Cat. 696	30
	Virgin and Child, with young John the Baptist and Saint Anne	Conrad Lauwers after Andrea Schiavone				
	Hercules, Deianira and the Centaur Nessus	Paolo Veronese	1586	Kunsthistorisches Museum	GG_1525	115
	Portrait of a Young Man					
	The Holy Infants	Leonardo da Vinci	circa 1486	Museo di Capodimonte		
	Blind Leading the Blind	Domenico Fetti	1620s	Staatliche Kunstsammlungen Dresden	644	215
	Portrait of a White-Bearded Man	Tintoretto	1570	Kunsthistorisches Museum	GG_25	103
	Portrait of an unknown man	Kalker				
	Portrait of a Doge	Tintoretto (copy by David Teniers the Younger)	circa 1570	Courtauld Gallery	P.1978.PG.435	97
	Venus and Cupid	Thomas Willeboirts Bosschaert	1630s	private collection		
	Portrait of an unknown man	Holbeen				
	Portrait of an unknown man	Tintoretto (copy by Lucas Vorsterman the Younger)				104
	Nativity	Michael Sittow	1510/20	Kunsthistorisches Museum	GG_5878	
	Portrait of an unknown man	Tintoretto				
	Landscape	Paul Bril				
	Flower Still-life	Alexander Hoefnagel				
	Woman looking over her Shoulder	Anthony van Dyck	1630s	Hermitage	ГЭ-7725	
	The Bravo	Titian	1520	Kunsthistorisches Museum	GG_64	23
	Portrait of an unknown man	Jan van Scorel (copy by David Teniers the Younger)				

== Provenance ==
This painting was one of those forcibly "donated" by Baron Alphonse de Rothschild in 1938 and it was meant for the Führermuseum, looted by the Nazis following the Austrian Anschluss with Germany in 1938. The looted painting was stored with many other Rothschild treasures in the Austrian salt mines of Altaussee where they were discovered by the Allies after the war and returned to the Austrian government. Despite many efforts by Alphonse and his heirs, only granddaughter Bettina Burr was able to achieve restitution. This painting was finally paid for in 1999 after 50 years of "ownership" with a credit line of "donated by Clarice Rothschild in memory of her husband".
