= St. John the Baptist in the Wilderness =

Painting by Hieronymus Bosch

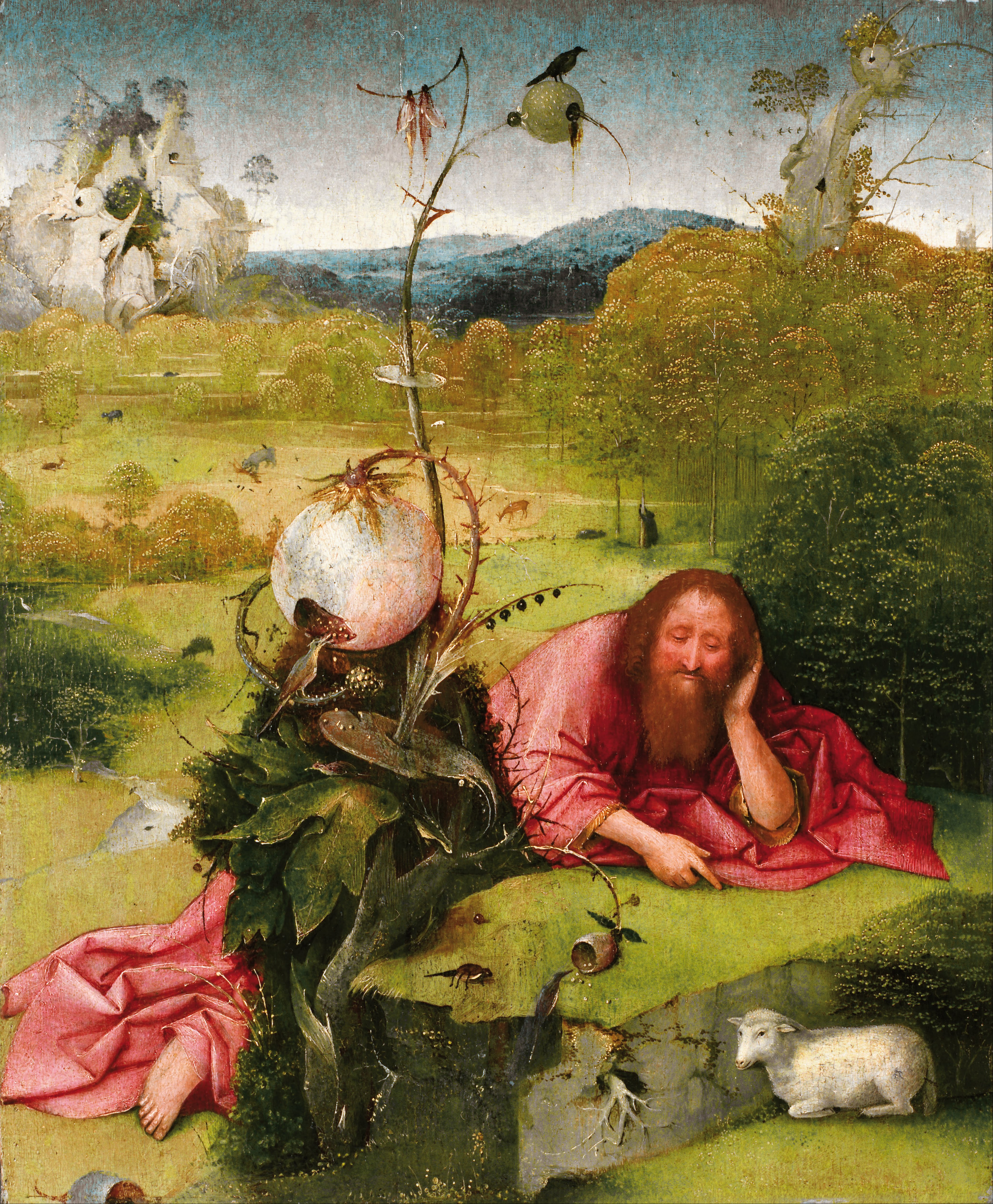
- Artist: Hieronymus Bosch
- Year: c. 1489
- Type: Oil on panel
- Dimensions: 48.5 cm × 40 cm (19.1 in × 16 in)
- Location: Museum of Lázaro Galdiano, Madrid

St. John the Baptist in the Wilderness is an oil painting on panel by the Netherlandish artist Hieronymus Bosch, created c. 1489. The painting was acquired by the Spanish collector Lázaro Galdiano in 1913. It is on display in the Lázaro Galdiano Museum, in Madrid, Spain.

The painting forms a pair with St. John the Evangelist on Patmos which is in Berlin. In the 1940s it was noticed that the two paintings could have been designed as the wings of an altarpiece. It has since been suggested that the altarpiece in question was an artwork which is known to have been made for St. John's Cathedral, 's-Hertogenbosch. The painting is difficult to date. If the 's-Hertogenbosch hypothesis is correct, the date would be around 1489, although later dates have been proposed based on other criteria.

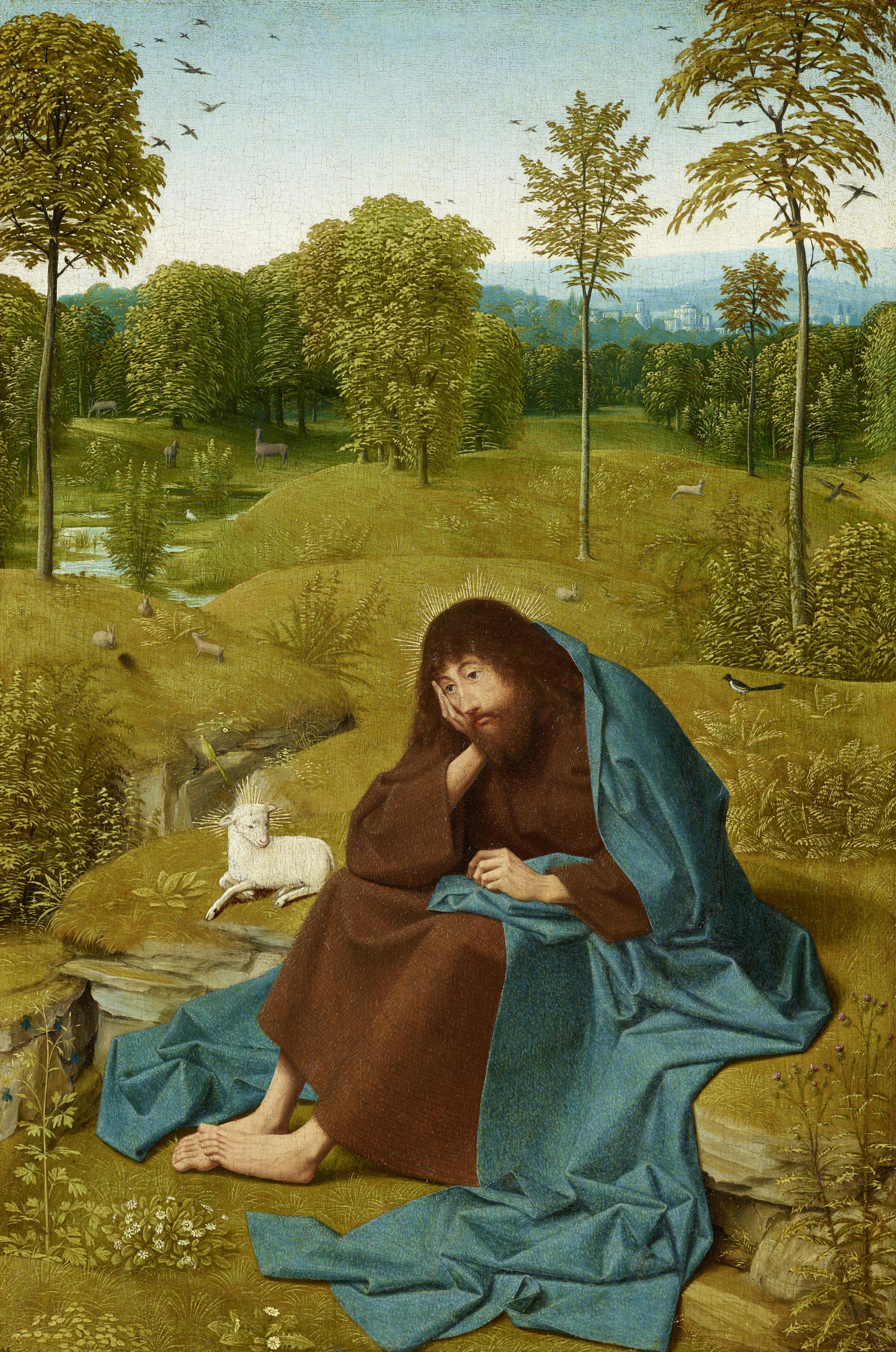
A painting of same subject by Geertgen tot Sint Jans

John the Baptist is often depicted with a lamb. The animal is said to symbolise the sacrifice of the saint as an innocent victim of the wickedness of mankind, or it could be that the saint is pointing towards Jesus Christ, whose symbol is the paschal lamb (John 1:29–36). Bosch's painting differs from other paintings of John the Baptist in the fantastical objects he depicts.

== See also ==
- List of paintings by Hieronymus Bosch
- Illustrious Brotherhood of Our Blessed Lady
- The Tricks of Leonardo da Vinci & Hieronymus Bosch. Xavier d'Hérouville & Aurore Caulier. December 2023. HAL Open Science
