= Consequences of War =

Painting by Peter Paul Rubens

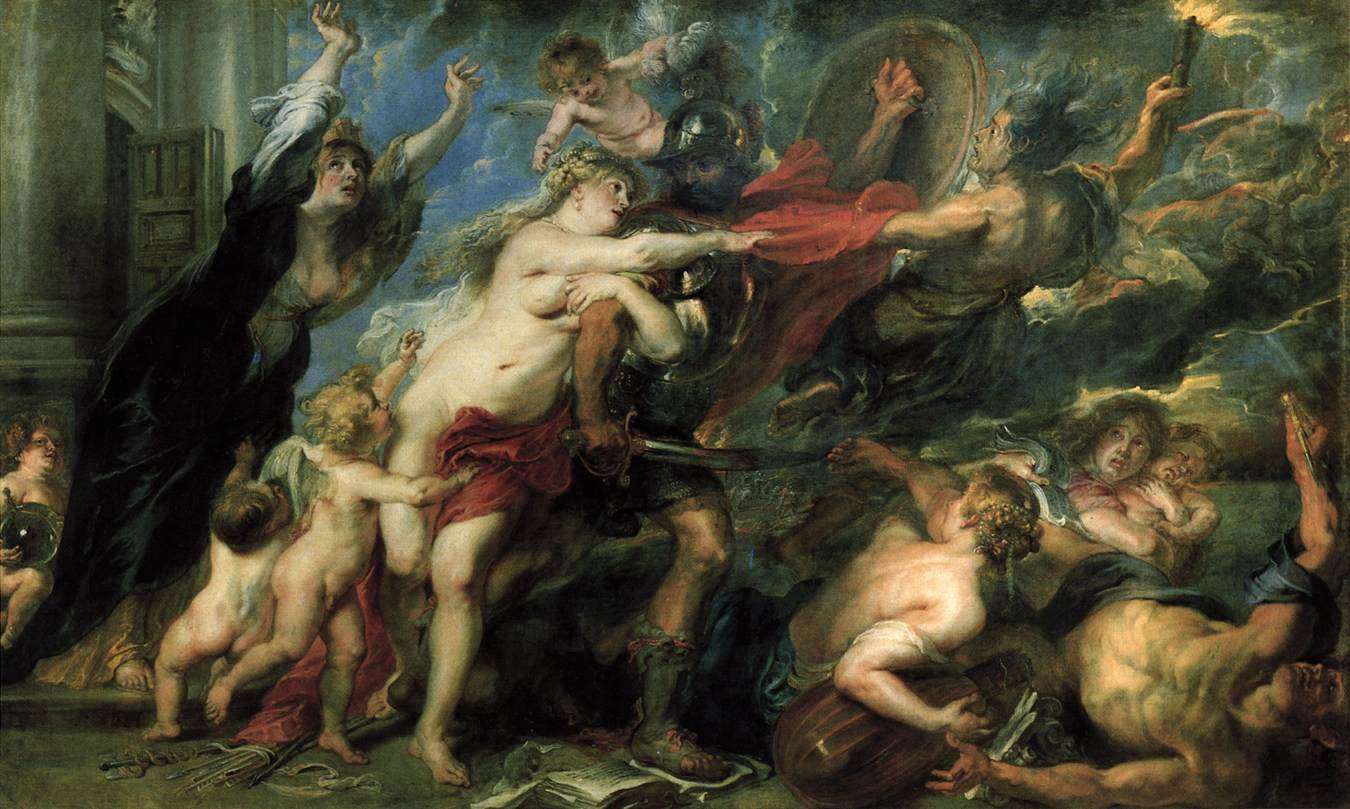
- Artist: Peter Paul Rubens
- Year: 1638–39
- Medium: Oil on canvas
- Dimensions: 206 cm × 345 cm (81 in × 136 in)
- Location: Palazzo Pitti, Florence

Consequences of War, also known as Horror of war, was executed between 1638 and 1639 by Peter Paul Rubens in oil paint on canvas. It was painted for Ferdinando II de' Medici. Although commissioned by an Italian, art historians characterize both the work and the artist as Flemish Baroque. It serves as a commentary on a European continent ravaged by the Thirty Years' War, and the artist employed numerous symbols, both contemporary and ancient, to deplore the state of the continent.

== Symbols ==
Mars: Mars is the central figure in the composition. The Roman god of war charges with shield and sword as well as breastplate and helmet. The figure's skin and cape are dominated by the color red to further emphasize his identity as the Roman god of war.

Book and Drawing: Underneath Mars's feet lie a book and a drawing. These represent the manner in which the arts and letters are forgotten and destroyed in the chaos and violence of war.

Temple of Janus: To the far left of the painting, the Temple of Janus appears with its door ajar. In Ancient Rome, the Temple of Janus would be closed to indicate times of peace while an open door denoted war. This phenomenon is referenced in Fasti by Ovid.

Venus: The Roman goddess of love (and Mars's mistress) endeavors to restrain Mars and maintain peace. Her arm is looped ineffectually around his in a physical gesture. Her expression, meanwhile, plaintively entreaties Mars to stop his charge. Venus is depicted in typical Rubensian fashion with characteristic rolls of exposed body (see The Arrival of Marie de' Medici or The Judgment of Paris for comparison). The goddess is accompanied by Amors and Cupids who attempt to assist her.

Fury Alekto: Alekto drags Mars on to his destructive purpose with a torch held high. Alekto was the Greek and Roman incarnation of anger. She appears in both Virgil's Aeneid and Dante's Inferno. Alekto translates from the Greek to "the implacable or unceasing anger."

Pestilence and Famine: These effects of war are depicted as monsters accompanying Fury Alekto in order to heighten the terror of the scene. In addition, they deliberately refer to the apocalypse.

Harmony: Rubens depicts Harmony as a woman holding a lute. However the chaos has pushed her to the ground and broken her lute. The damage to the lute represents the discord of war.

Mother: Beside Harmony a mother clutches a child. This, Rubens writes, shows how "War corrupts and disrupts and destroys everything" including "procreation and charity."

Architect: An architect and his instruments have similarly fallen to the ground, showing how in times of war destruction, and not creation, is the norm.

Arrows: Arrows lie on the ground near Venus and the Amors. When bound together they represent Concord but in their present state show its absence. Next to them lie the olive branch and caduceus, the symbols of peace. They too are depicted cast upon the ground to signify their absence in Europe.

Woman in black: The figure to Venus's left represents Europe and its suffering. Her cross-topped globe represents the Christian world and is carried by the small angel to her immediate left.

== Historical context ==
Rubens painted Consequences of War between 1638 and 1639 in response to the Thirty Years' War (1618–1648). The conflict's origins are complex and diverse but animosity between Protestants and Catholics played a significant role. In addition, struggles for political power in Europe contributed to and prolonged the war. Nearly all European states fought at some point in the conflict's long time span. The fighting involved Spain, France, Sweden, Denmark, the Netherlands, Austria, Poland, the Ottoman Empire, and the Holy Roman Empire. In particular, the war represented a continuation and extension of Habsburg and Bourbon rivalry as well as French and Habsburg animosity.

As depicted in Consequences of War, the fighting led to the destruction of large areas of Europe as well as outbreaks of both pestilence and famine. Much of the fighting took place in the German states which suffered significant depopulation as a result. The Thirty Years' War ended in 1648 with the treaties of Osnabruck and Munster as well as the Peace of Westphalia.

== Rubens the diplomat ==
Peter Paul Rubens was not only a virtuosic painter but also a passionate and crafty diplomat. Rubens, although closely allied to Isabella and the Spanish Netherlands, often had occasion to travel and visit foreign monarchs in his position as a court painter. Rubens associated with the dukes of Mantua, King Phillip IV, Charles I, and Marie de' Medici. He served as a negotiator for the Spanish Netherlands (and for the cause of peace more generally), and for France and England.

Indeed, Rubens lobbied for an end to the Thirty Years' War with considerable passion and cleverness. The painter sought to bring Spain and England, traditional enemies, to peace in the hopes that the Spanish would then pressure the Dutch into following suit. During this period Rubens carried messages, demands, and concession agreements back and forth between Phillip IV and Charles I to ultimately reach a conclusion. For his diplomatic work Rubens was eventually decreed a "gentleman of the household" by Isabella and knighted by Charles I.

== Artistic style ==
Rubens' work, including Consequences of War, represents the height of Flemish Baroque painting. His style is referred to as pan-European and synthesizes elements of Italian Renaissance and Baroque artists to form his own artistic approach. The work of Michelangelo, Titian, Carracci, and Caravaggio informed Rubens's paintings in varying degrees.

Viewers note the influence of Michelangelo in Rubens's interest and brilliance in depicting the human form. Consequences of War contains not only Rubens's trademark women but also the well muscled forms of Mars, Alekto, and the architect. These muscular figures are reminiscent of the powerful specimens depicted in Michelangelo's Last Judgment, David, and The Creation of Adam. This trend in Rubens's art is actually best shown in the extraordinarily well built men of Rubens's Elevation of the Cross.

Titian's influence is most evident with respect to depiction of the female nude. Rubens's women bear a striking resemblance to Titian's Venus with a Mirror and Nymph and Shepherd. However, Titian's most famous work, Venus of Urbino, undoubtedly inspired Rubens's depiction of her in Consequences of War. The similarity between the two portraits of the goddess is unmistakable.

Rubens's debt to Annibale Carracci lies at least in part in his composition. The densely populated drama of Consequences of War recalls Carracci's Loves of the Gods, in particular The Triumph of Bacchus. Furthermore, the careful use of color, light, and shadow as opposed to line to show space used by Carracci in Flight into Egypt became a key part of Rubens's style. Indeed, Rubens's style became a highly coloristic one.

== Notes ==
External videos
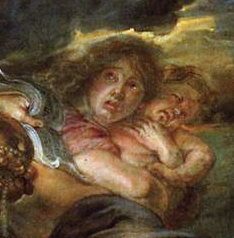
- Rubens, The Consequences of War, Smarthistory
