= St. John the Evangelist on Patmos =

Painting by Hieronymus Bosch

St. John on Patmos
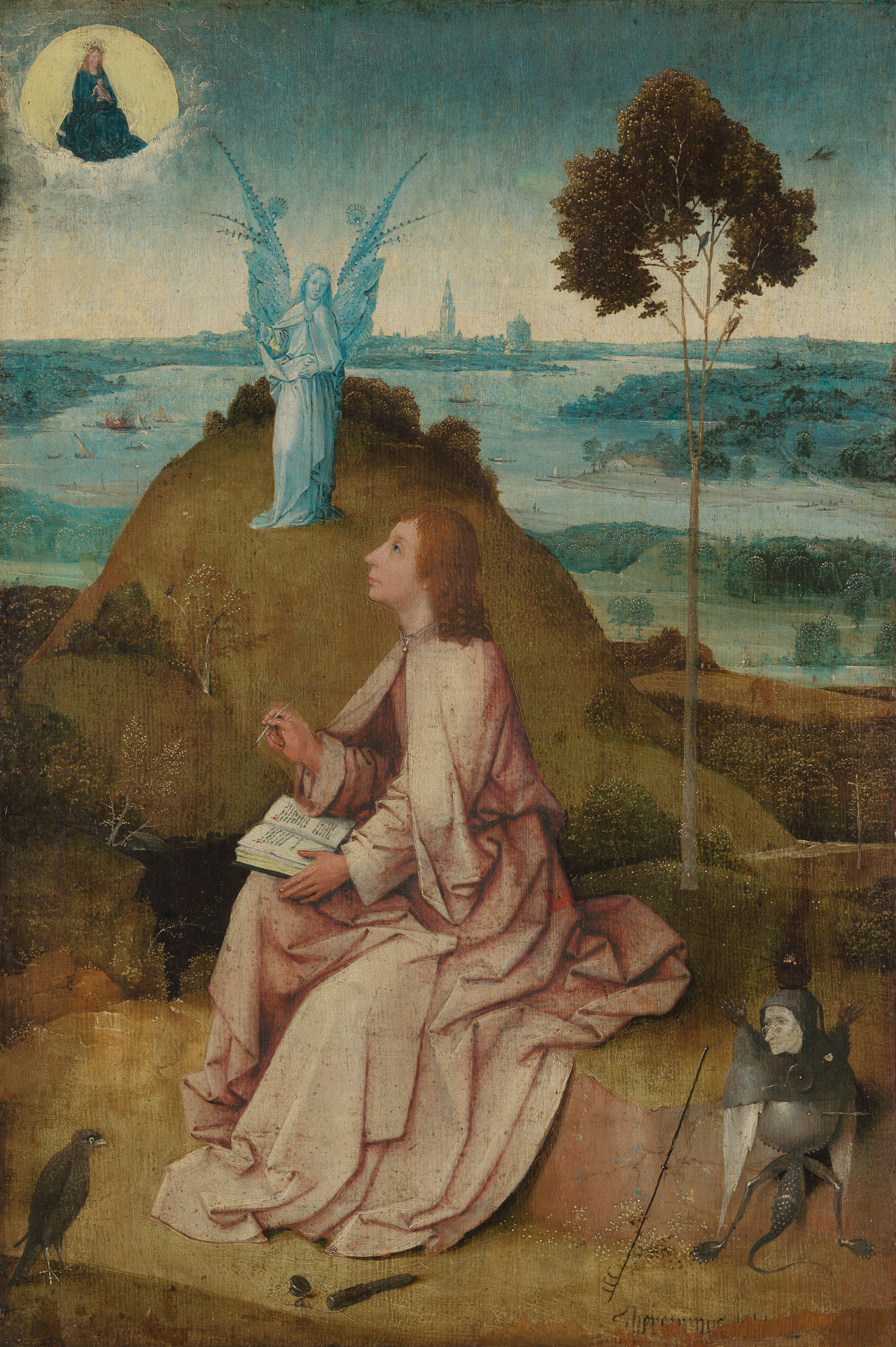
- Artist: Hieronymus Bosch
- Year: c. 1489
- Type: Oil on oak panel
- Dimensions: 63 cm × 43.3 cm (25 in × 17.0 in)
- Location: Gemäldegalerie, Berlin

St. John on Patmos is an oil on panel painting by the Netherlandish artist Hieronymus Bosch, created c. 1489. The painting is held in the Gemäldegalerie, in Berlin, Germany. The reverse is also painted, the title of that picture is Scenes from the Passion of Christ and the Pelican with Her Young.

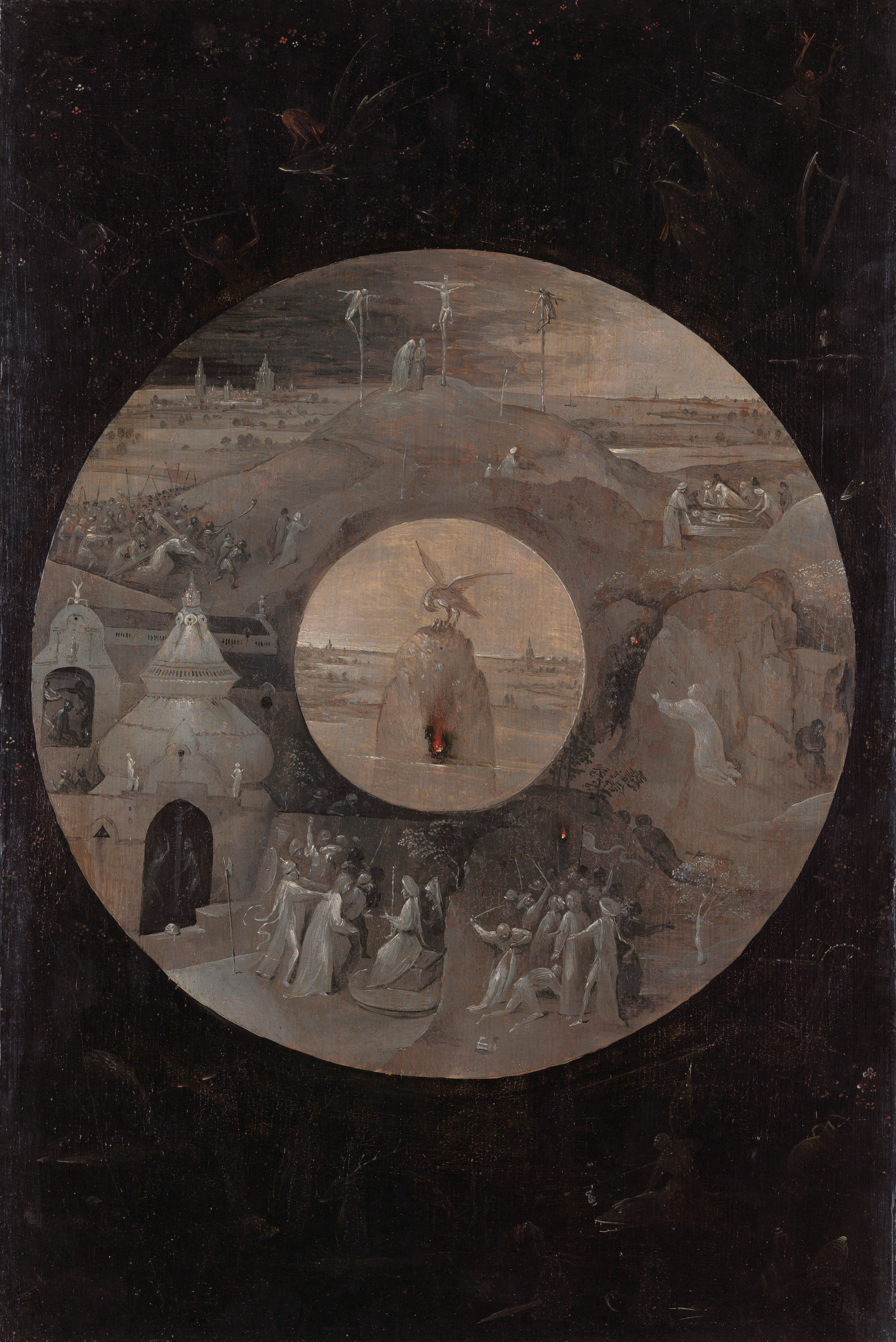
Scenes from the Passion of Christ, reverse side of St. John on Patmos, Oil on panel, diameter 39 cm.

== Related work ==
St. John the Evangelist on Patmos forms a pair with St. John the Baptist in the Wilderness, which is in Madrid. It was noted in the 1940s that the two paintings may have been designed as wings of an altarpiece. Such an origin would explain the grisaille painting on the reverse, as it is characteristic of polyptychs to have both sides of folding panels decorated. It has since been suggested that the altarpiece in question was an artwork which is known to have been made for St. John's Cathedral, 's-Hertogenbosch.

The painting is difficult to date. If the 's-Hertogenbosch hypothesis is correct, the date would be around 1489, although later dates have been proposed based on other criteria.

== See also ==
- John of Patmos
- List of paintings by Hieronymus Bosch
