= Gallery of Archduke Leopold Wilhelm in Brussels (Galdiano) =

1653 painting by David Teniers the Younger

Archduke Leopold Wilhelm and the artist in the archducal picture gallery in Brussels
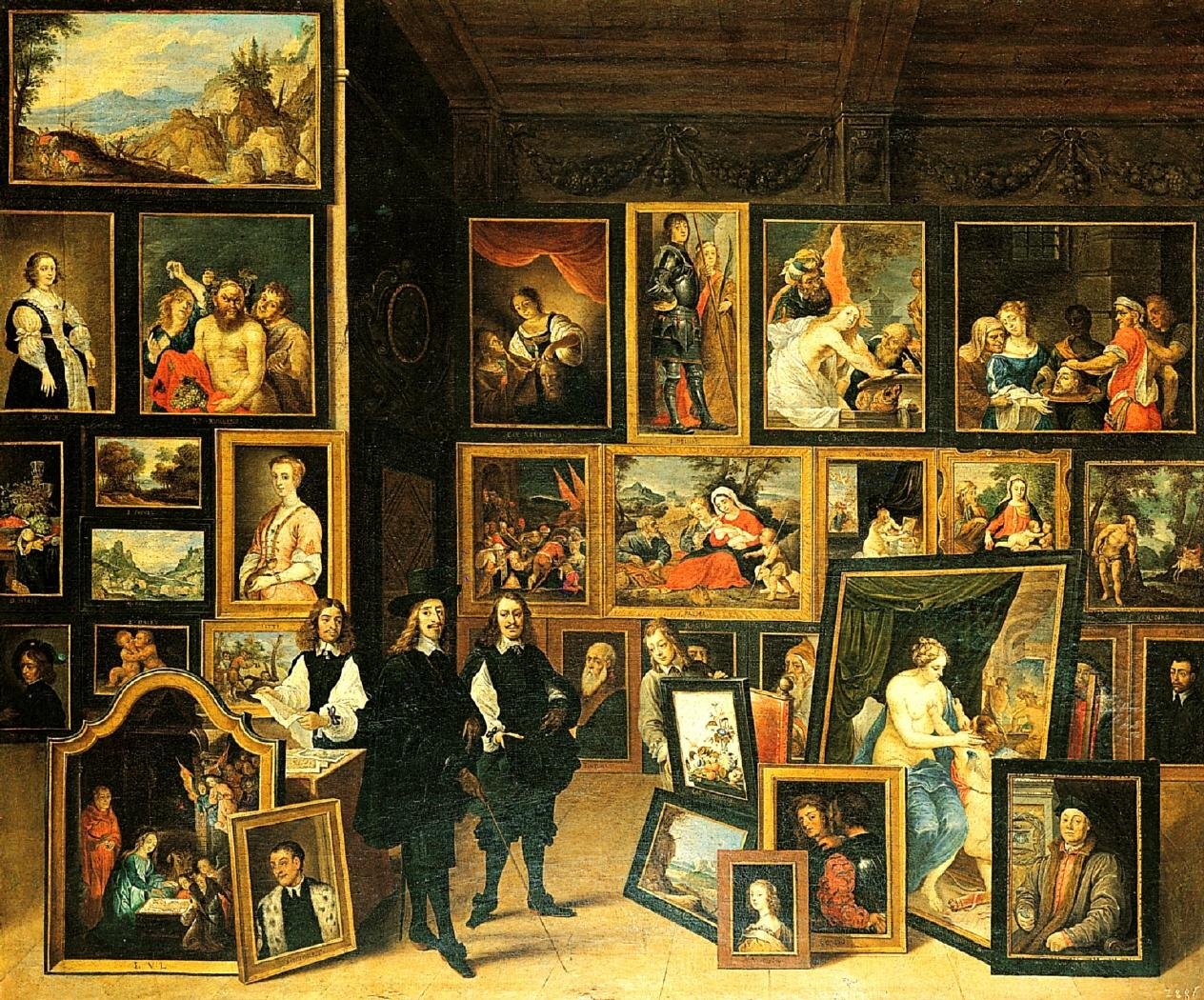
- Artist: David Teniers the Younger
- Year: 1653
- Medium: oil on canvas
- Dimensions: 73.5 cm × 88 cm (28.9 in × 35 in)
- Location: Museo Lázaro Galdiano; Madrid

Archduke Leopold Wilhelm and the artist in the archducal picture gallery in Brussels is a 1653 painting of Archduke Leopold Wilhelm's Italian art collection by the Flemish Baroque painter David Teniers the Younger, now held in the collection of Museo Lázaro Galdiano in Madrid.

The painting shows the Archduke as a collector with friends admiring a set of paintings. The artist himself holds his hat in his hand and is listening to his patron as the archduke gestures with his cane towards some recent acquisitions. The paintings are arranged in rows on the walls of an L-shaped room, with the men standing in front of a doorway with the sculpted portrait of the archduke. Another set of paintings are positioned in the foreground leaning against chairs for inspection.

This painting is dated 1653 and was painted after earlier, larger versions that David Teniers the Younger prepared to document the Archduke's collection before he employed 12 engravers to publish his Theatrum Pictorium, considered the "first illustrated art catalog". He published this book of engravings after the Archduke had moved to Austria and taken his collection with him. It was published in Antwerp in 1659 and again in 1673. The most impressive of these gallery paintings was the large version on copper in the Museo del Prado with a different selection of paintings. That was produced as a gift from the archduke to Philip IV of Spain.

== Paintings depicted ==
Many of the recognizable paintings in the collection, not all of which were included in the Italian catalog prepared by Teniers, are still in the Viennese collection. This copy was probably produced as a gift in tandem with a similar version formerly in the Rothschild collection.
