= Portrait of Infanta Isabella Clara Eugenia (Rubens) =

1625 painting by Rubens

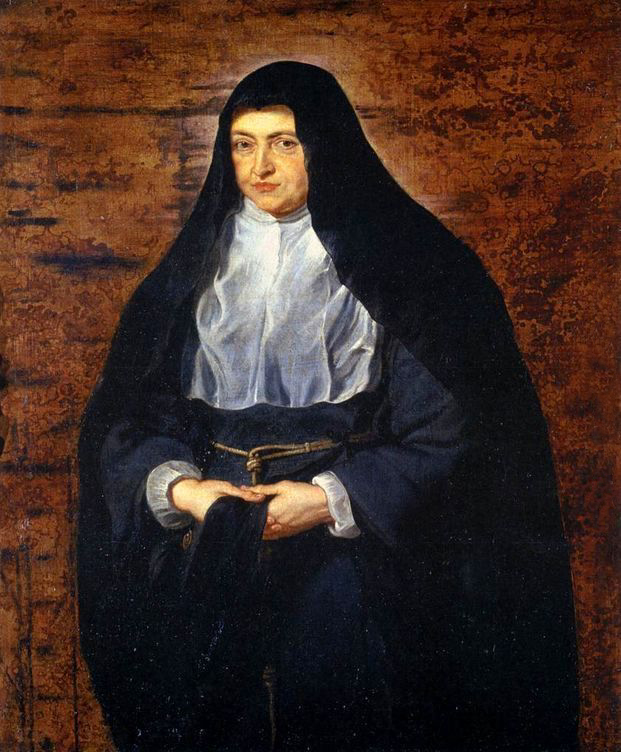
Portrait of Infanta Isabella Clara Eugenia (1625) by Rubens

The Portrait of Infanta Isabella Clara Eugenia is a painting by Rubens of Isabella Clara Eugenia. It is dated to 1625 and shows her in the habit of the Poor Clares, which she assumed on 22 October 1621 after the death of her husband Archduke Albert of Austria. She visited the painter's studio while on her way back from Breda in 1625 to see the painting begun, as a master copy from which several others could be drawn. The master copy is now in the Galleria Palatina in Florence, having been traded in the past for a portrait of the same subject by Anthony van Dyck (now in the Kunsthistorisches Museum in Vienna). Two other copies are known in private collections, while a third (with a modified background) is in the Norton Simon Museum in Pasadena (115.6 cm x 88.6 cm).

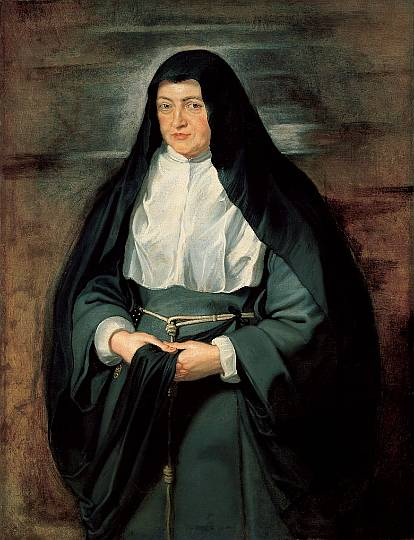
Norton Simon Museum

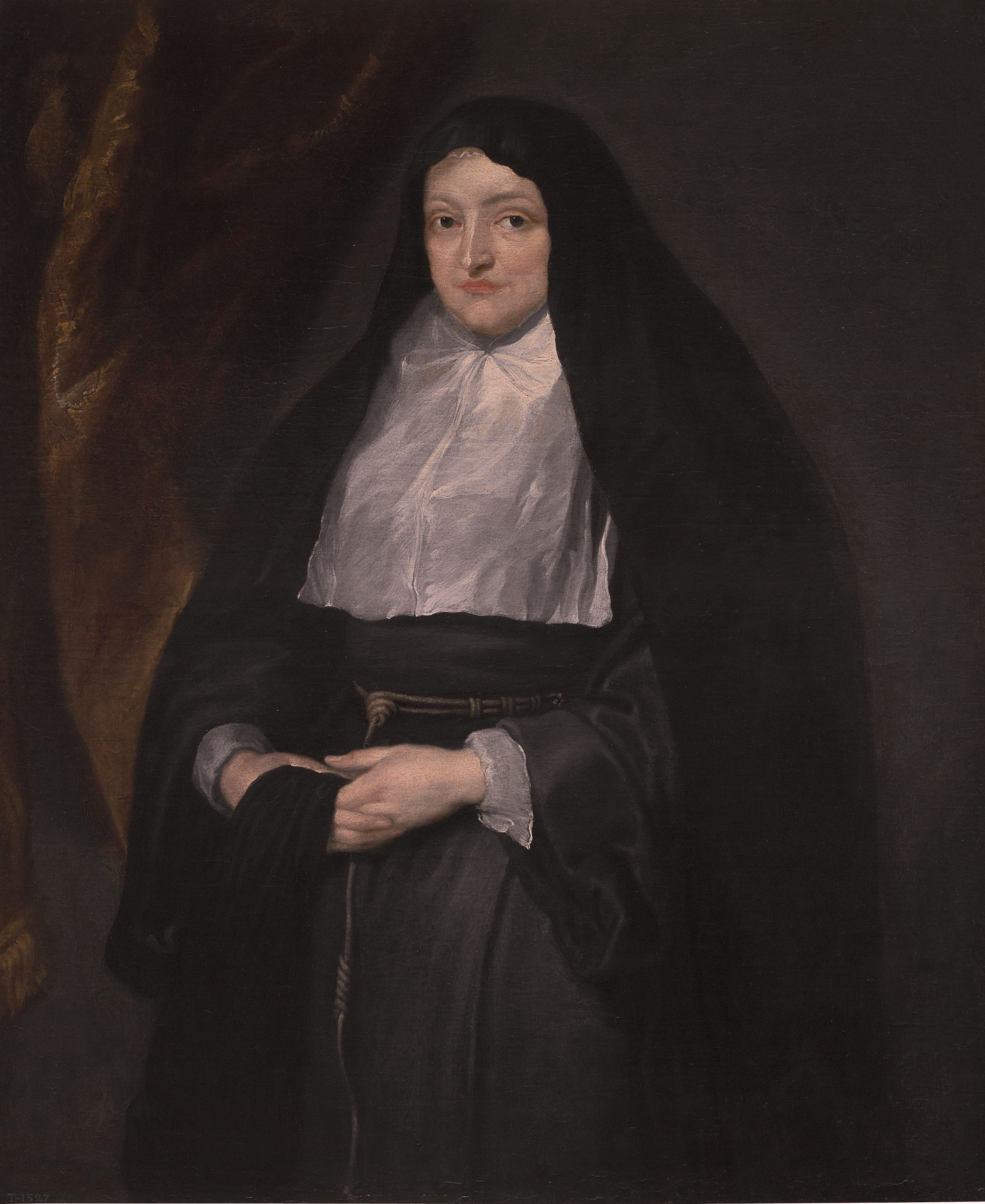
Prado

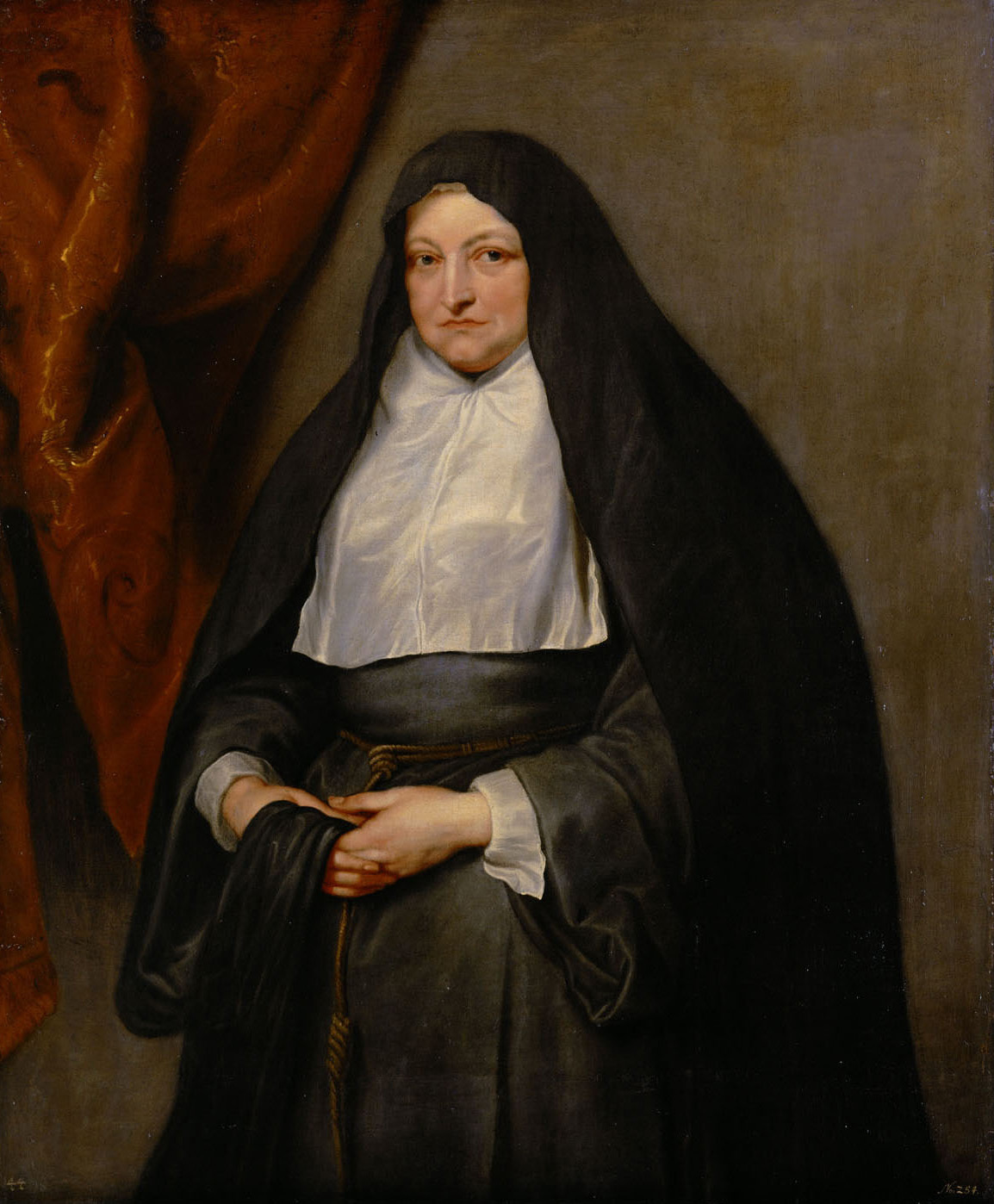
Kunsthistorisches Museum

== Bibliography ==
- (in Italian) Marco Chiarini, Galleria palatina e Appartamenti Reali, Sillabe, Livorno 1998. ISBN 978-88-86392-48-8
