= Portrait of Cardinal Guido Bentivoglio =

Painting by Anthony van Dyck

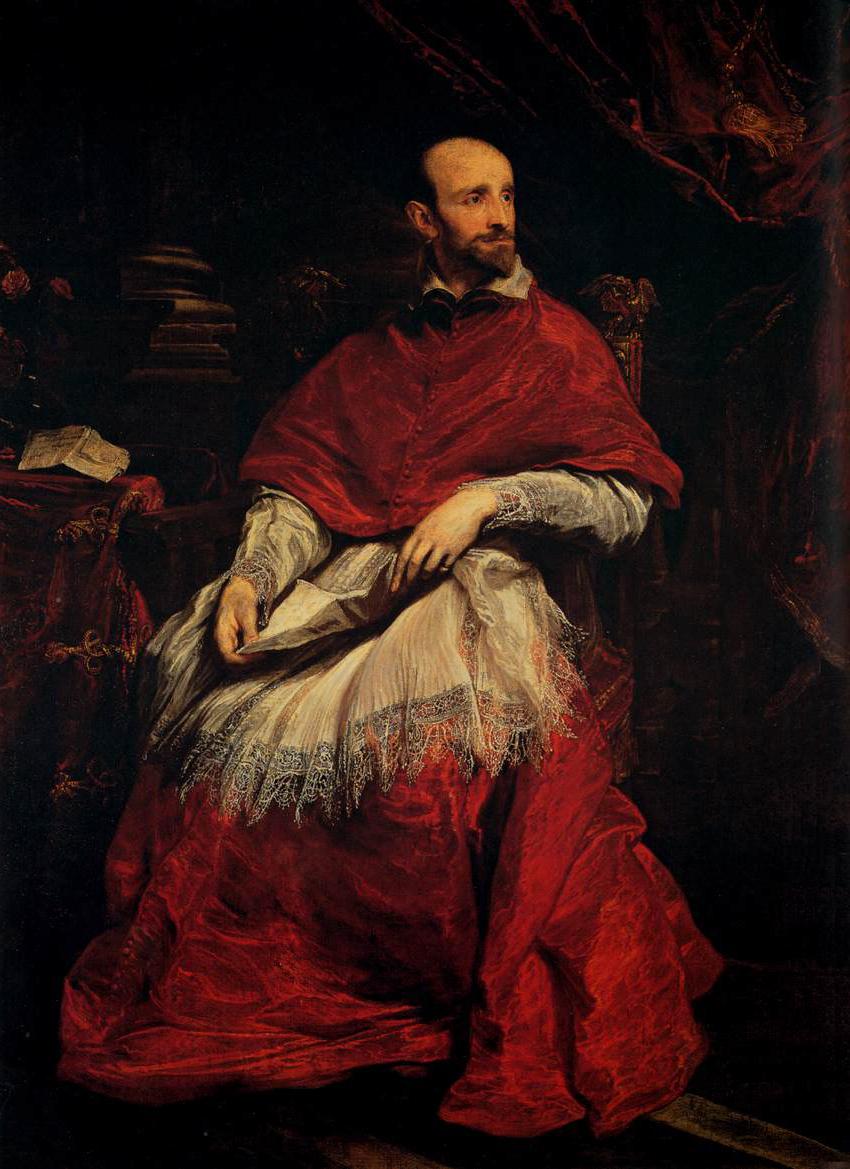
Portrait of Cardinal Guido Bentivoglio (c. 1623) by Anton van Dyck

Portrait of Cardinal Guido Bentivoglio is an oil on canvas painting of Guido Bentivoglio by Anthony van Dyck, now in the Galleria Palatina in Florence. It was painted around 1623 during the artist's stay in Italy - Bentivoglio had links to the artist's native Flanders.

It achieved an immediate and lasting popularity and was referred to in an 18th-century biography of the artist as "the finest, he made no other after it which could surpass it". The English painter Joshua Reynolds stated that "since van Dick [sic] was obliged to use crimson for this famous portrait, he placed a drapery of the same colour in the background and repeated the white [of the lace in the cardinal's lap] in a letter placed on a table and in the bouquet of flowers which he wished to introduce to create the same effect as on the table".

In 1653, a later member of the Bentivoglio family gave the work to Ferdinando II de' Medici and it subsequently appears in the inventories of the 'Guardaroba medicea', the Tribuna of the Uffizi and then in grand prince Ferdinando's apartments in the Palazzo Pitti, before entering its present home.

== See also ==
- List of paintings by Anthony van Dyck
