= Archduke Leopold Wilhelm in his Painting Gallery in Brussels =

Painting by David Teniers the Younger

The Archduke Leopold Wilhelm in his Painting Gallery in Brussels
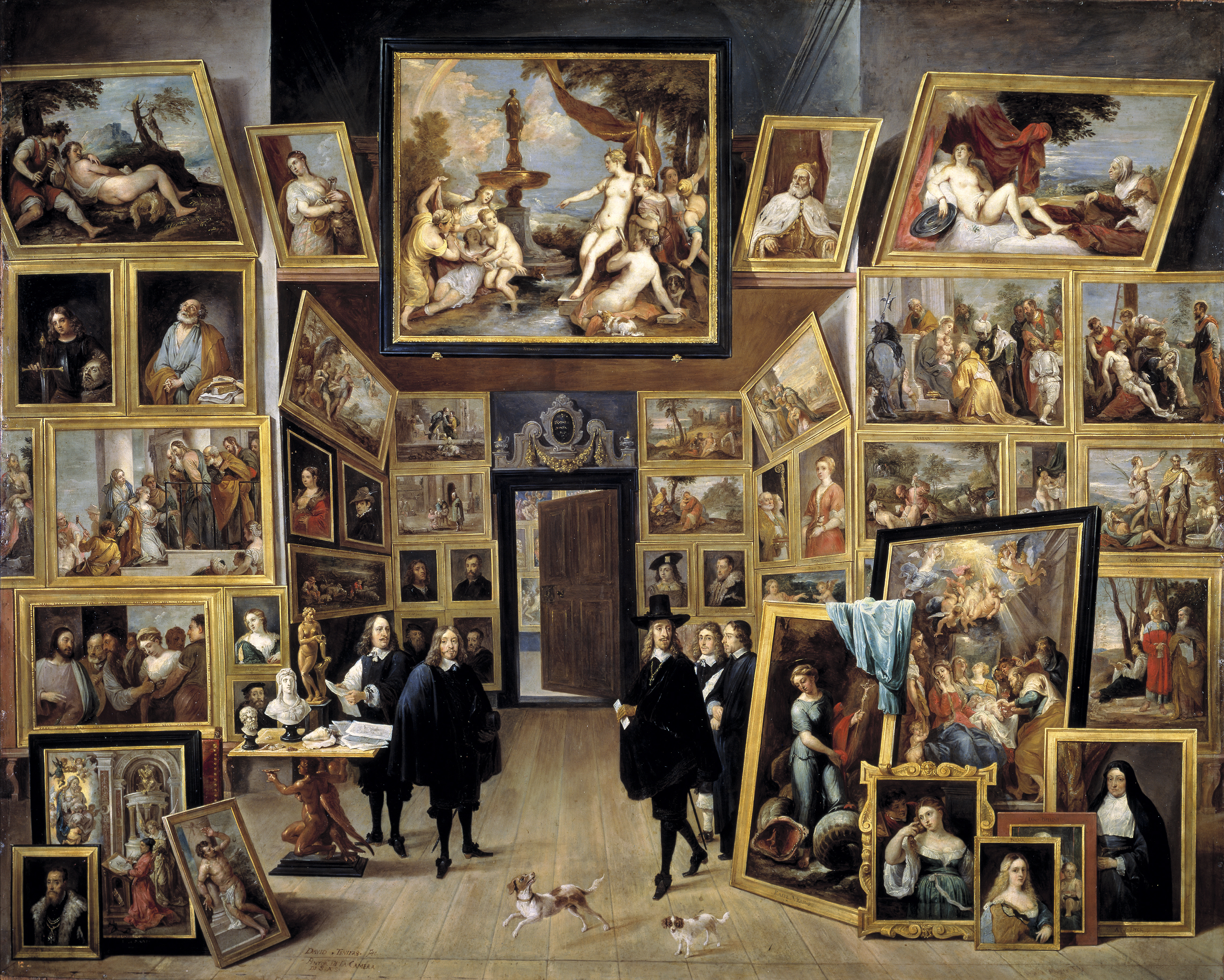
- Artist: David Teniers the Younger
- Year: 1647–1651
- Medium: oil on copper
- Dimensions: 104.8 cm × 130.4 cm (41.3 in × 51.3 in)
- Location: Prado Museum, Madrid

The Archduke Leopold Wilhelm in his Painting Gallery in Brussels is a 1651 painting of Archduke Leopold Wilhelm's Italian art collection by the Flemish Baroque painter David Teniers the Younger, now held in the Prado in Madrid.

== Description ==
The painting shows the Archduke as a collector with friends admiring a set of paintings. The artist himself is standing at a table inspecting engravings. The paintings are arranged in rows on rear walls, with more visible through a central doorway, and a set that are positioned in the foreground leaning against chairs for inspection.

== History ==
This painting is one of a set that David Teniers the Younger prepared to document the Archduke's collection before he employed 12 engravers to publish his Theatrum Pictorium, considered the "first illustrated art catalog". He published this book of engravings after the Archduke had moved to Austria and taken his collection with him. It was published in Antwerp in 1659 and again in 1673.

The Archduke commissioned this painting as a gift for Philip IV of Spain, possibly to show off the magnificence of his Brussels gallery after his recent Italian painting acquisitions from the estate sale of the Duke of Hamilton.

== List of paintings depicted ==
The following is a list of the recognizable paintings of the collection, not all of which were included in the Italian catalog prepared by Teniers, which was a selection of 243 of the most prized paintings out of a collection of 1300–1400 pieces. Many are still in the Viennese collection. Here is a list of the paintings depicted, which starts with the paintings on the rear wall, running from left to right and from top to bottom. Next listed are the paintings in the foreground propped against chairs:

| image | article | painter | year | collection | inventory nr. | catalog code |
|---|---|---|---|---|---|---|
| | Nymph and Shepherd | Titian | 1570s | Kunsthistorisches Museum | GG_1825 | 60 |
| | Judith with the head of Holofernes | Alessandro Varotari | 1630s | Kunsthistorisches Museum | GG_80 | 37 |
| | Diana and Callisto | Titian | 1568 | Kunsthistorisches Museum | GG_71 | 96 |
| | Portrait of Francesco Donato | David Teniers the Younger | 1650s | Museo del Prado | P07615 | 98 |
| | Danaë | Titian | 1554 | Kunsthistorisches Museum | GG_90 | 74 |
| | David with the Head of Goliath | Giorgione | 1510 | Kunsthistorisches Museum | GG_74 | 25 |
| | Penitent St. Peter | Jusepe de Ribera | 1630s | Kunsthistorisches Museum | GG_345 | 142 |
| | Aeneas called away from Dido | Andrea Schiavone | 1655 | Kunsthistorisches Museum | GG_5816 | 137 |
| | Tobit and the Dead Israelite | David Teniers the Younger after Domenico Fetti | 1650s | Courtauld Gallery | P.1978.PG.434 | 214 |
| | unknown | | | | | |
| | Aeneas Takes Leave of Dido | Andrea Schiavone | 1555 | Kunsthistorisches Museum | GG_5818 | 135 |
| | Adoration of the Kings | Paolo Veronese | 1585 | Kunsthistorisches Museum | GG_1515 | 123 |
| | Descent from the Cross | Tintoretto | 1547 | Kunsthistorisches Museum | GG_1565 | 109 |
| | Raising the Young Man of Nain | Paolo Veronese | 1560s | Kunsthistorisches Museum | GG_52 | 124 |
| | Laura | Giorgione | 1506s | Kunsthistorisches Museum | GG_31 | |
| | Portrait of a man | unknown | | | | |
| | Burial | Domenico Fetti | | | | |
| | Rest on the Flight into Egypt (Titian) | Titian | | Longleat | | 62 |
| | Left panel San Cassiano Altarpiece | Antonello da Messina | 1475 | Kunsthistorisches Museum | GG_7727 | 4 |
| | Lady with an Ermine | Titian | | | | 94 |
| | The Good Samaritan | Francesco Bassano the Younger | 1575 | Kunsthistorisches Museum | GG_12 | 152 |
| | Toilet of Venus | David Teniers the Younger | 1655 | Philadelphia Museum of Art | Cat. 696 | 30 |
| | Scipio Africanus | Andrea Schiavone | 1555 | Kunsthistorisches Museum | GG_1558 | 138 |
| | Christ and the Adulteress | Titian | 1520 | Kunsthistorisches Museum | GG_114 | 67 |
| | Young Woman in Green Dress | Palma Vecchio | 1513 | Kunsthistorisches Museum | GG_66 | 196 |
| | Shepherds and Sheep | David Teniers the Younger | 1650s | Metropolitan Museum of Art | 89.15.22 | |
| | Portrait of Giorgione? | | | | | |
| | Portrait of Titian? | | | | | |
| | Portrait of Leonardo da Vinci? | | | | | |
| | Portrait of an unknown man in a fur coat | | | | | |
| | Venus and Cupid | Paris Bordone | 1545–1550 | National Museum in Warsaw | M.Ob.628 | 211 |
| | The Circumcision | Rubens | 1605 | Chiesa del Gesù e dei Santi Ambrogio e Andrea church, Genoa | | |
| | The Three Philosophers | Giorgione | 1500s | Kunsthistorisches Museum | GG_111 | 20 |
| | Portrait of an unknown man in a fur coat | | | | | |
| | Saint Luke painting the Virgin | Jan Gossaert | 1510s | Kunsthistorisches Museum | GG_894 | |
| | Saint Sebastian | Paolo Veronese | 1565 | Kunsthistorisches Museum | GG_1538 | 114 |
| | Saint Margaret and the Dragon | Raphael | 1518 | Kunsthistorisches Museum | GG_171 | 2 |
| | Woman with a Mirror | Titian | 1515 | Louvre | INV 755 | |
| | Violante | Titian | 1515s | Kunsthistorisches Museum | GG_65 | 194 |
| | Central panel San Cassiano Altarpiece | Antonello da Messina | 1475 | Kunsthistorisches Museum | GG_2574 | 5 |
| | Portrait of Infanta Isabella Clara Eugenia as a nun | Anthony van Dyck | 1627 | Kunsthistorisches Museum | GG_496 | |
