= The Circumcision (Rubens) =

Painting by Peter Paul Rubens

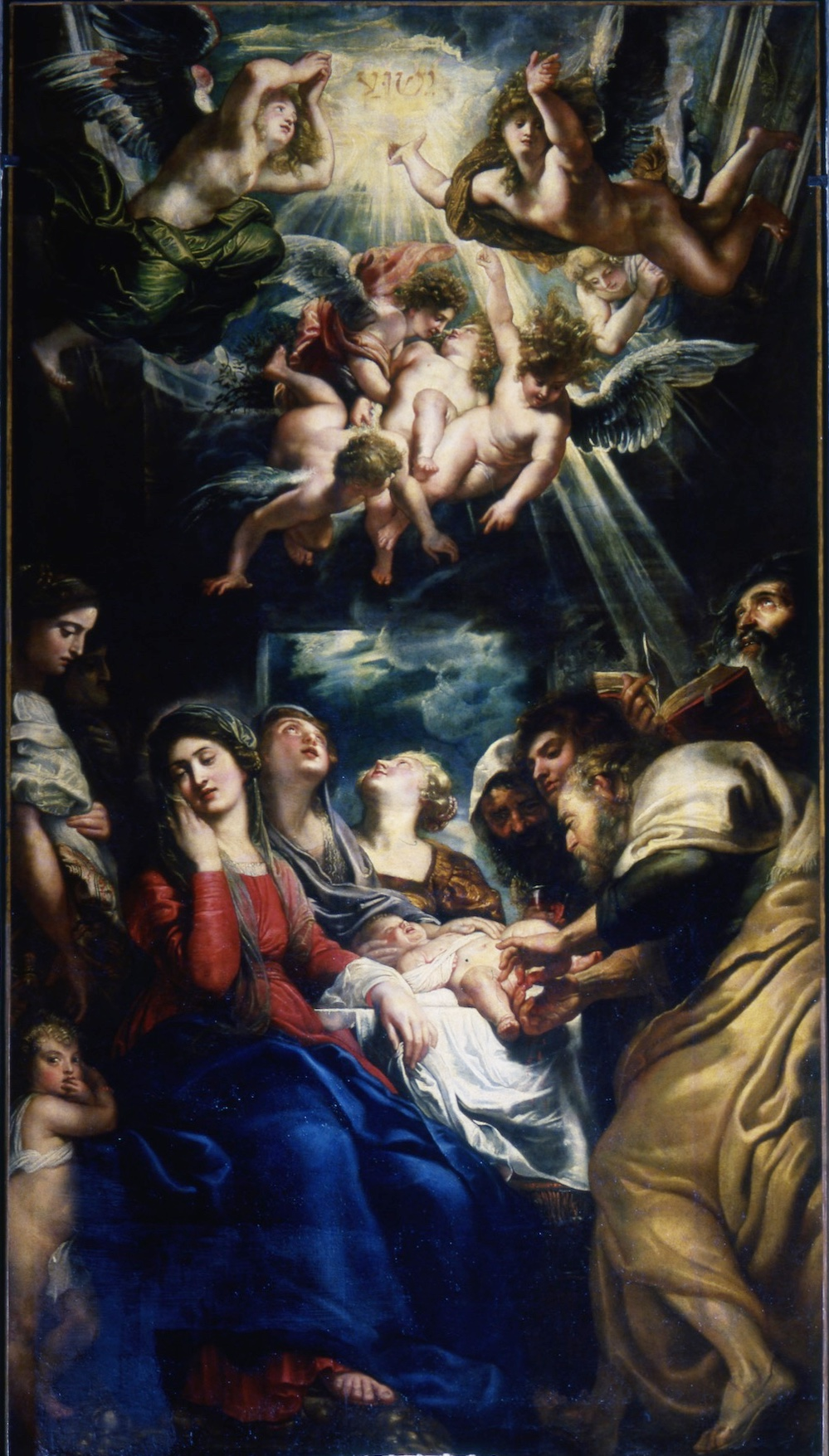
- Artist: Peter Paul Rubens
- Year: 1605
- Medium: Oil on canvas
- Dimensions: 400 cm × 225 cm (160 in × 89 in)
- Location: Chiesa del Gesù e dei Santi Ambrogio e Andrea; Genoa

The Circumcision is an oil on canvas painting of the Circumcision of Jesus by Peter Paul Rubens, produced in 1605 during his stay in Rome. It is now in the Chiesa del Gesù e dei Santi Ambrogio e Andrea church in Genoa.

It was commissioned by Marcello Pallavicino, vestryman of the Casa Professa of Jesuits in Genoa. It is mainly influenced by Mantuan paintings from the court of Vincenzo Gonzaga, with a strongly foreshortened viewpoint.

There is another version of the subject by the artist, in the Academy of Fine Arts Vienna.

== Bibliography ==
- G. Bertelli, G. Briganti, A. Giuliano, Storia dell'Arte Italiana, vol. 3, p. 299, Roma 2009, Edizioni Scolastiche Bruno Mondadori
