= Nymph and Shepherd =

Painting by Titian

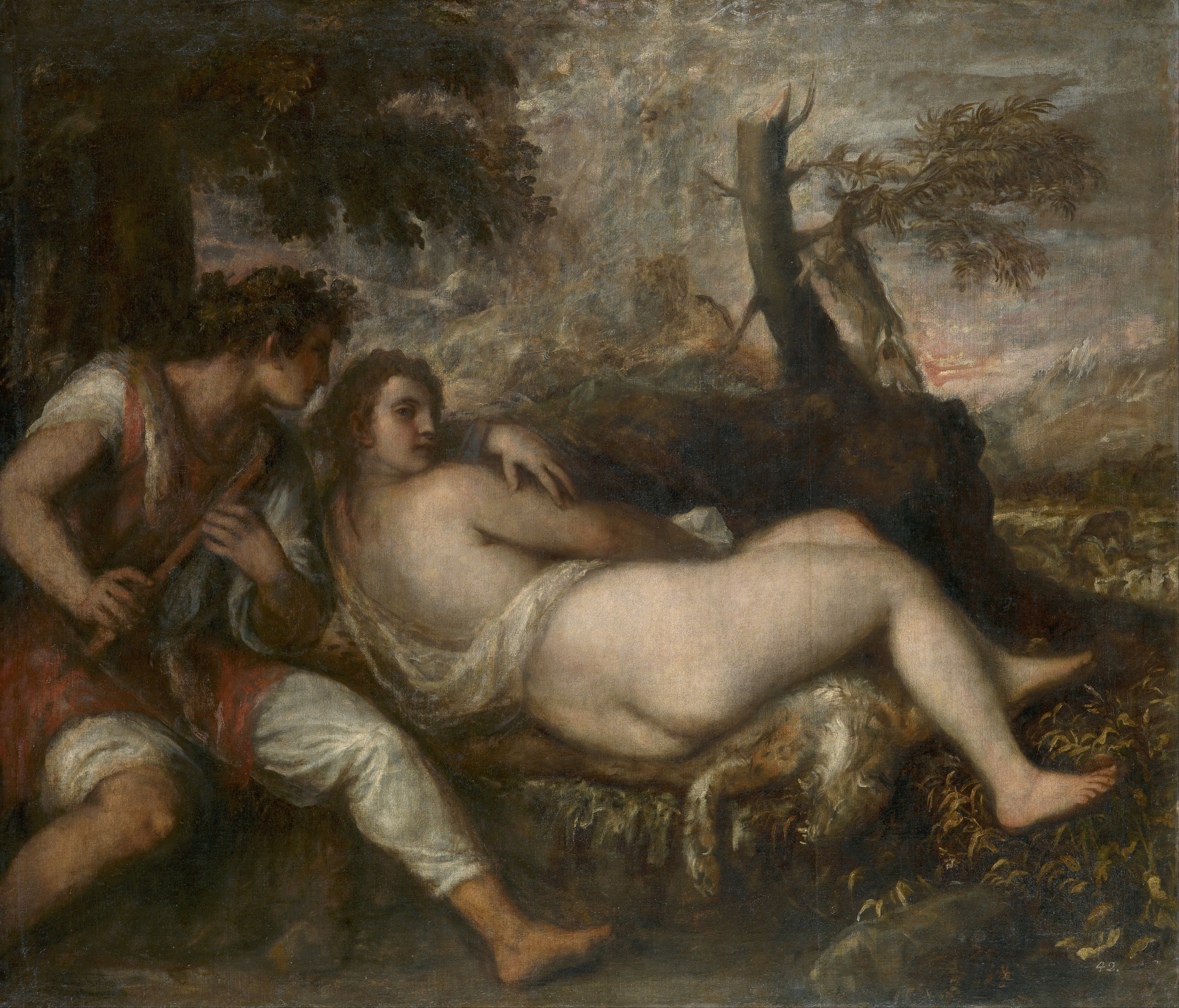
- Artist: Titian
- Year: c. 1570
- Medium: Oil on canvas
- Dimensions: 150 cm × 187 cm (59 in × 74 in)
- Location: Kunsthistorisches Museum; Vienna
- Accession: GG_1825

Nymph and Shepherd (Italian Ninfa e pastore; German: Nymphe und Schäfer), also called Shepherd and Nymph, is an oil painting by the Venetian master Titian, made about 1570. The painting is in the collection of the Kunsthistorisches Museum, in Vienna.

== Provenance ==
- 1636—In the collection of Bartolomeo della Nave, in Venice;
- 1638–1649—In the collection of James Hamilton, 1st Duke of Hamilton;
- 1660—In the collection of Archduke Leopold Wilhelm of Austria.

== Description ==
This painting by Titian is a Pastoral scene. In the foreground a male shepherd sits, playing what appears to be a flute. Next to him is a reclining female nude of a Nymph, or mythical female figure seated atop an animal skin with her back to the viewer, but looking over her shoulder. As the pair rests against a tree in this forest scene, in the background of the image, a goat is shown climbing a tree stump.

== Stylistic Elements ==
The painting is done in the Italian Mannerism style of the late Italian Renaissance painting movement. The image takes on a slightly different physical appearance from earlier works done by the artist-- List of works by Titian, emphasizing brushwork and a more muted color scheme. Later works by the artist put more focus on the materiality of the canvas and incorporating this into the final image itself. The painting underwent restorations from 2002 to 2007, in this time an evaluation of the painting techniques was done, revealing the artist's wide range in use of brush sizes as denoted by stroke length as well as the artist's use of his fingers to apply paint. Scholarly debate surrounds the two subjects of this image, many theorizing that they are representative of mythological pairs, with both Dionysus and Ariadne or Paris (mythology) and Oenone as thought to be the artist's true intent of depiction. The expressive, very visible brushstrokes used by the artist have also been discussed as an anticipation of the Impressionism movement to come centuries later.

== Gallery ==
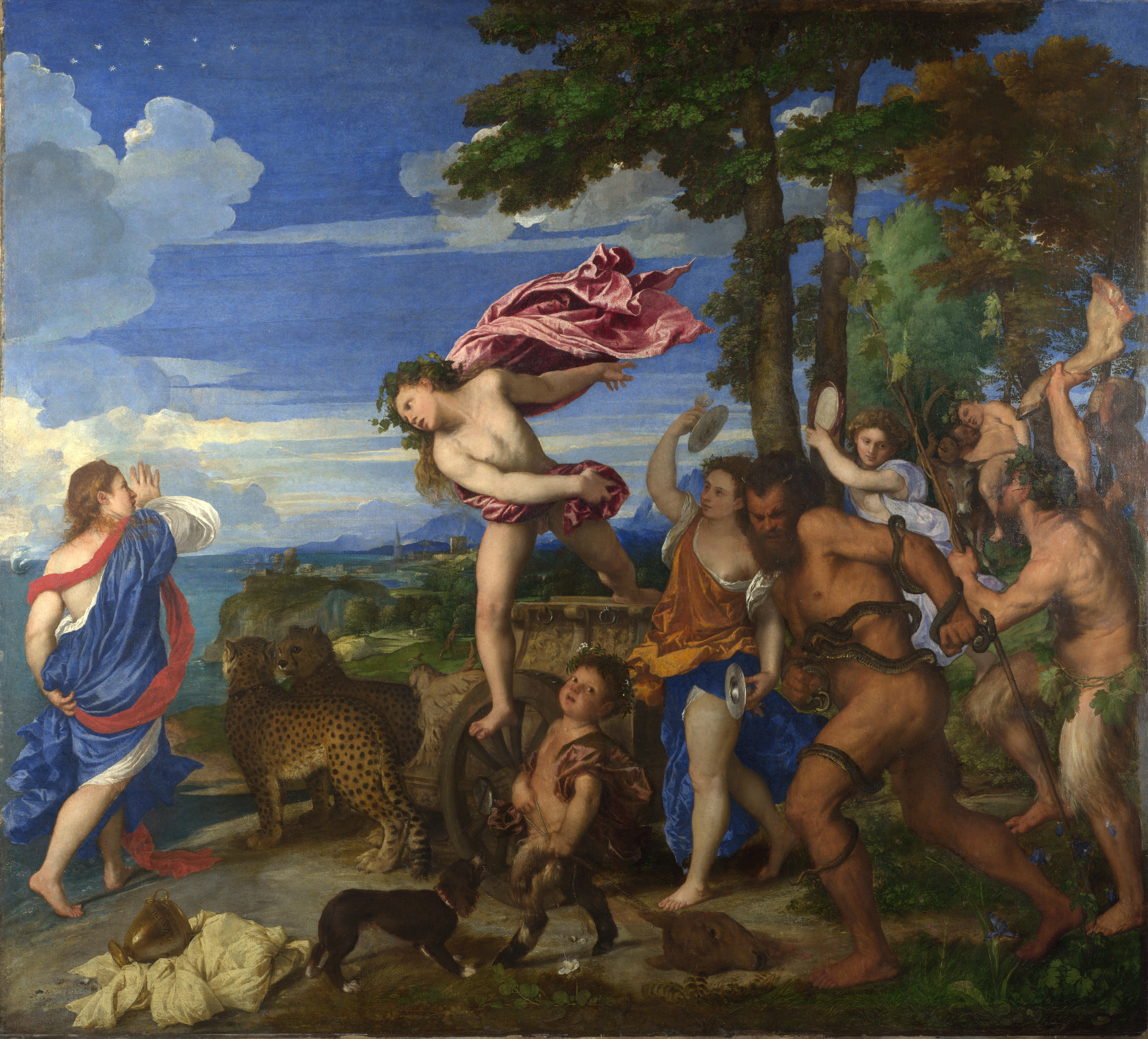
Titian's Bacchus and Ariadne (1522-23)

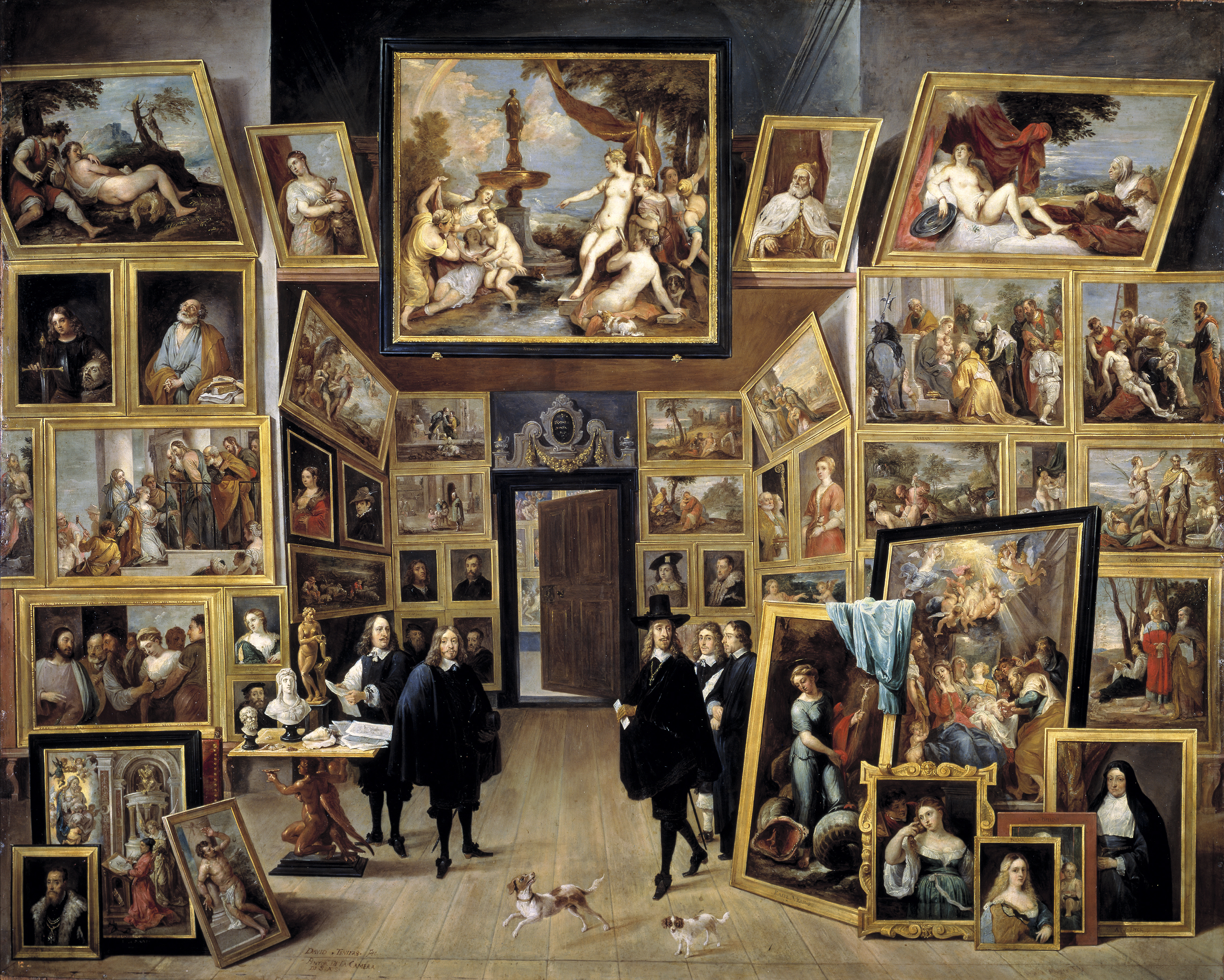
Archduke Leopold Wilhelm in his Painting Gallery in Brussels by David Teniers the Younger, c. 1651

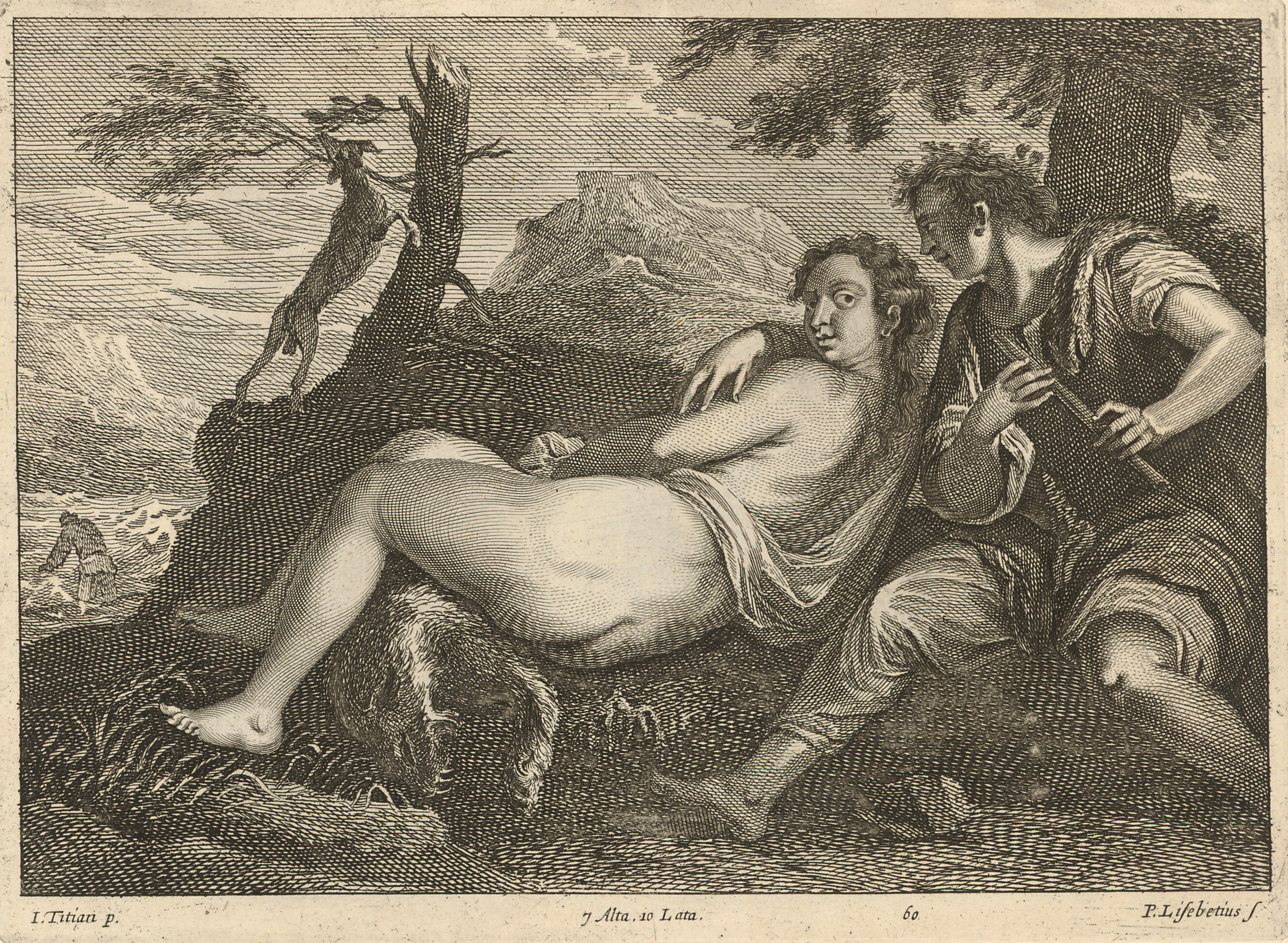
Print by P. van Lisebetten for the Theatrum Pictorium, 1673

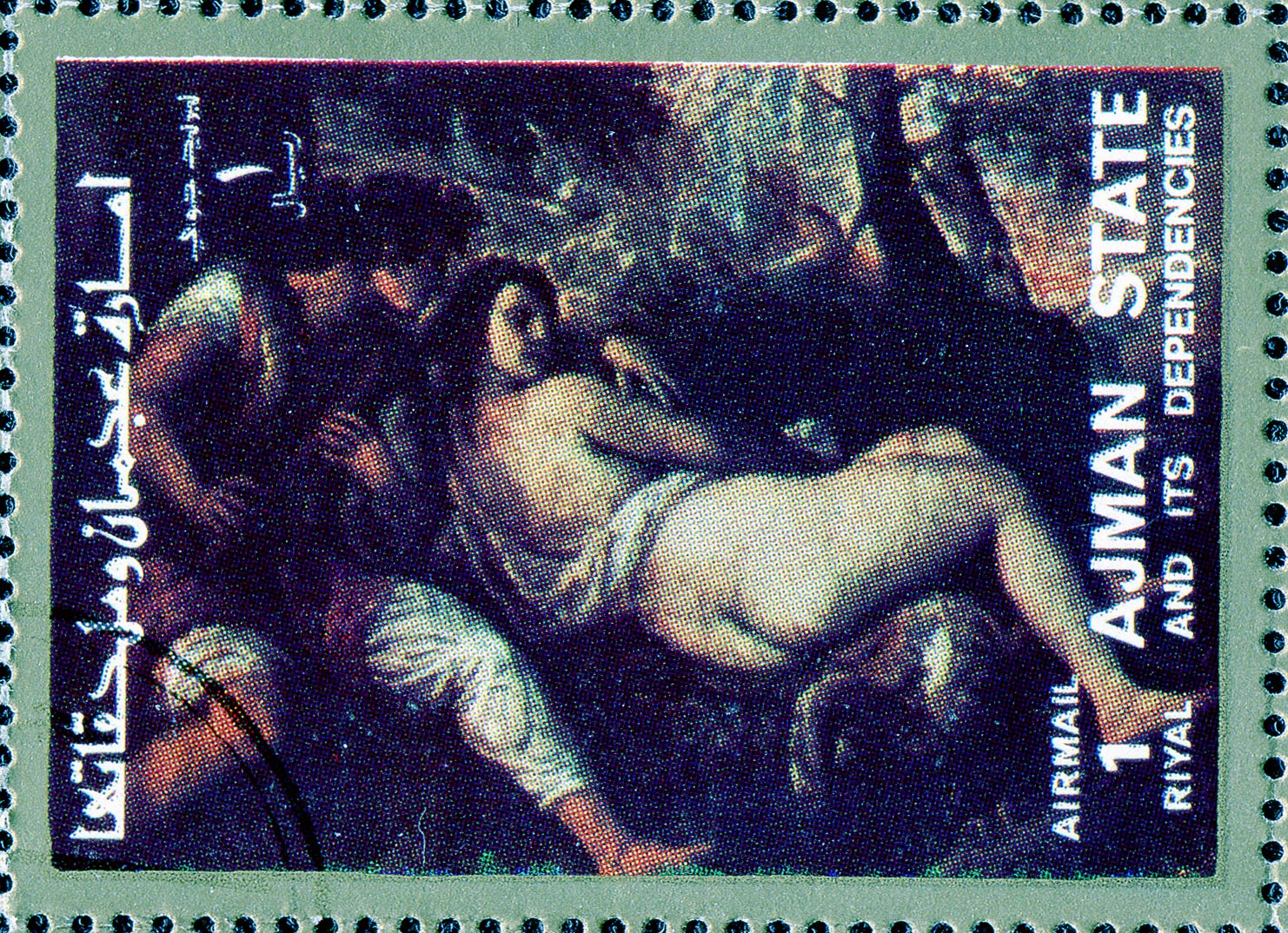
Stamp of the United Arab Emirates after Titian

== See also ==
- List of works by Titian
