= Lázaro Galdiano Museum =

Art museum in Madrid, Spain

- Museo Lázaro Galdiano
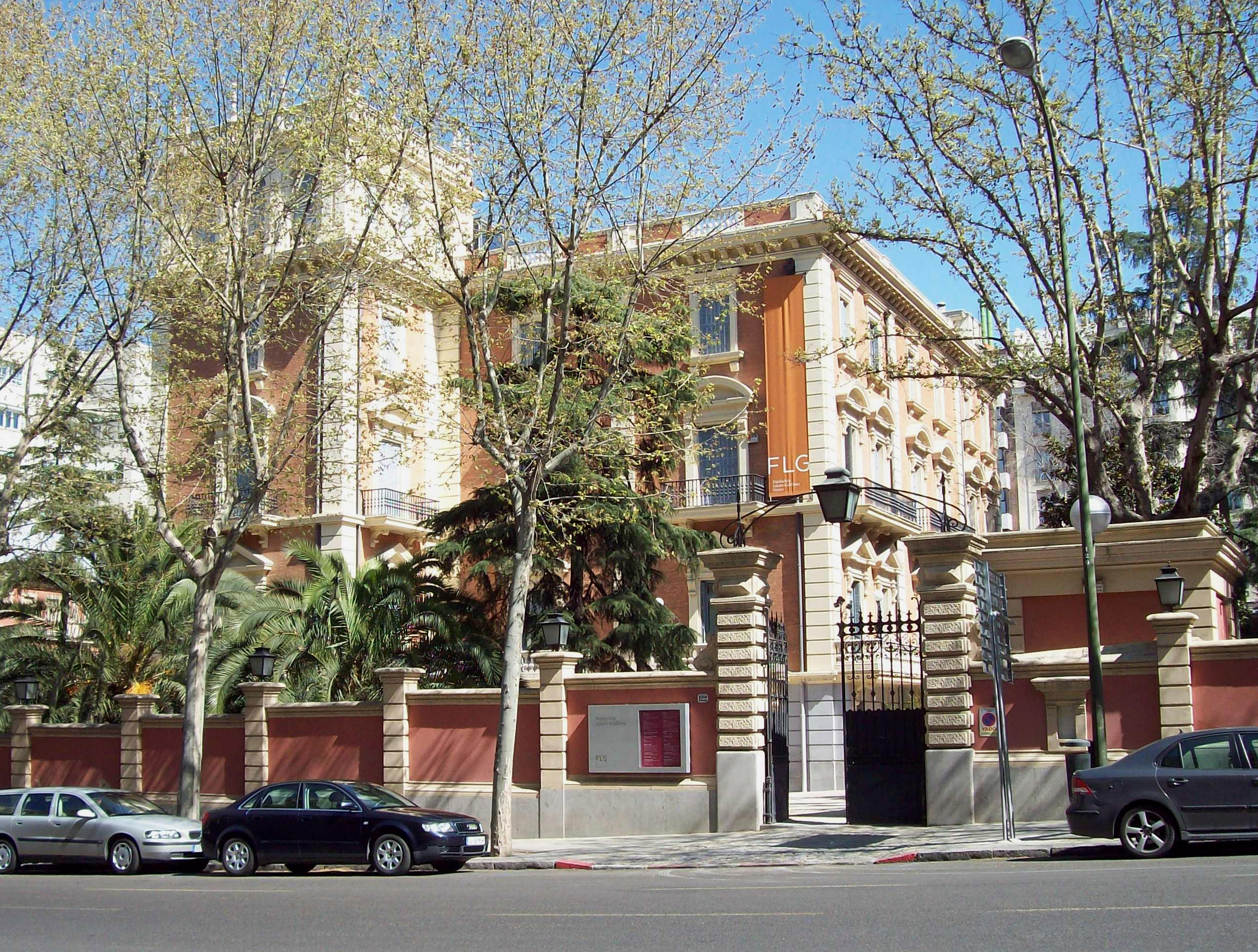
- Façade of the museum
- Established: 27 January 1951
- Location: Calle de Serrano 122, Madrid, Spain
- Coordinates: 40°26′13″N 3°41′09″W
- Type: Art museum
- Architectural style: Neo-Renaissance

Spanish Cultural Heritage
- Official name: Museo Lázaro Galdiano
- Type: Non-movable
- Criteria: Monument
- Designated: 1962
- Reference no.: RI-51-0001380

The Lázaro Galdiano Museum (Spanish: Museo Lázaro Galdiano) is an art museum in Madrid, Spain. It houses the art collection of José Lázaro Galdiano. The museum was inaugurated on 27 January 1951.

== History ==
The palatial building was constructed in 1903 as the residence of Lázaro Galdiano and his wife and is set within grounds that also hold the library containing Galdiano's important collection of incunabula and manuscripts. The conversion to a museum has respected the original interiors, which feature elaborate baroque painted ceilings commissioned by Galdiano,

As he died in 1947, Galdiano bequeathed his entire personal collection of over 12,000 items to the Spanish State.

Following the creation of the Fundación Lázaro Galdiano in 1948, and refurbishment works in the building led by Fernando Chueca Goitia, the museum was inaugurated on 27 January 1951.

The building was declared Bien de Interés Cultural in 1962.

== Collection ==
The museum contains important collections of valuable works from the prehistoric period to the nineteenth century, with a focus on Iberian work. Major categories include jewellery, small bronzes, both ecclesiastical and domestic silver, ceramics, carved ivory, and numismatics. Objects come not only from Iberia but also from major centers of medieval artistry, including Limoges and Egypt. While the Renaissance is especially well represented, the collection features important early medieval objects, including Visigothic work, and works crafted by Iberia's ancient Celtic culture.

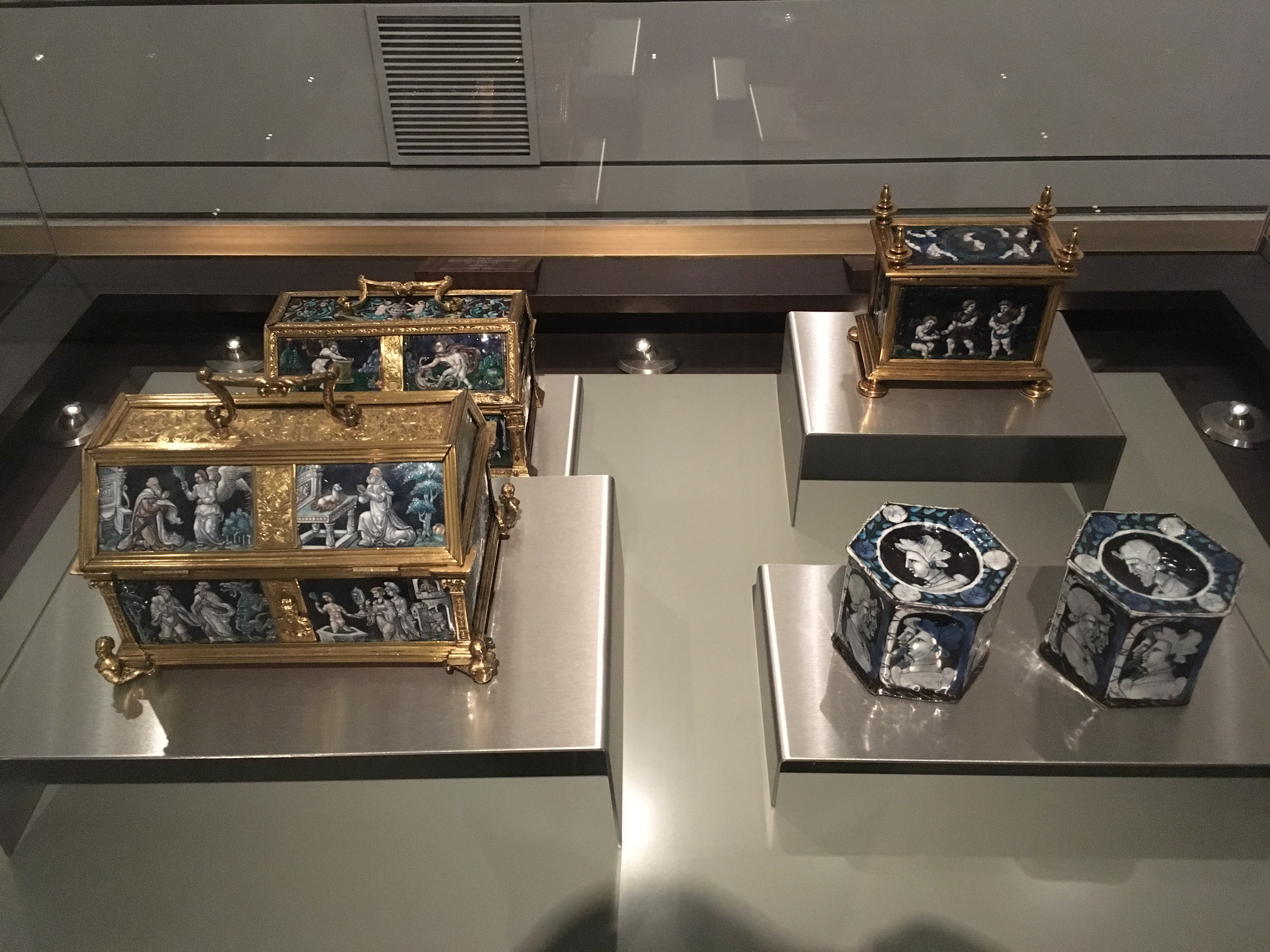
Limoges caskets and saltcellars, 16th century

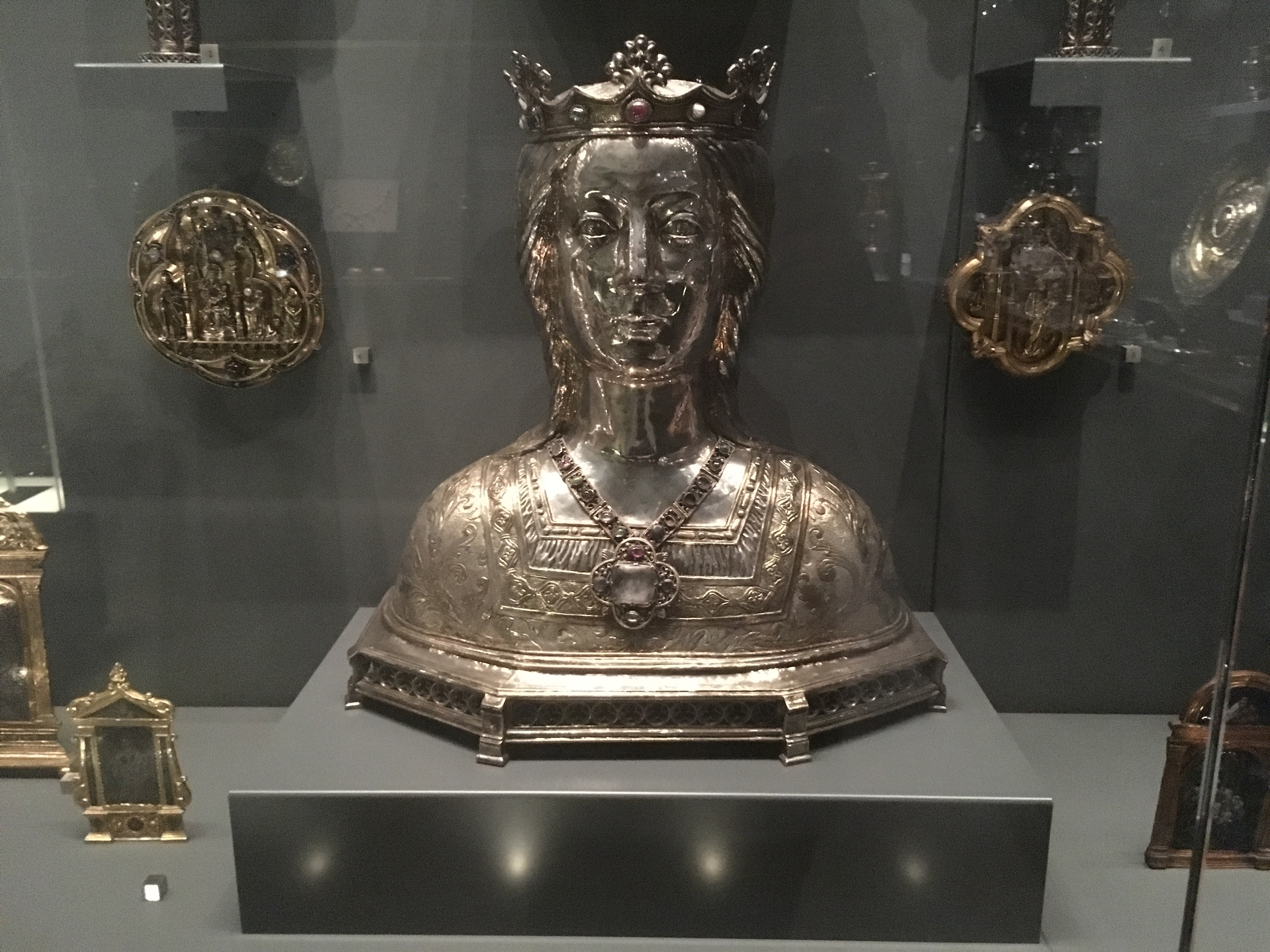
A bust-reliquary, first half of the 17th century

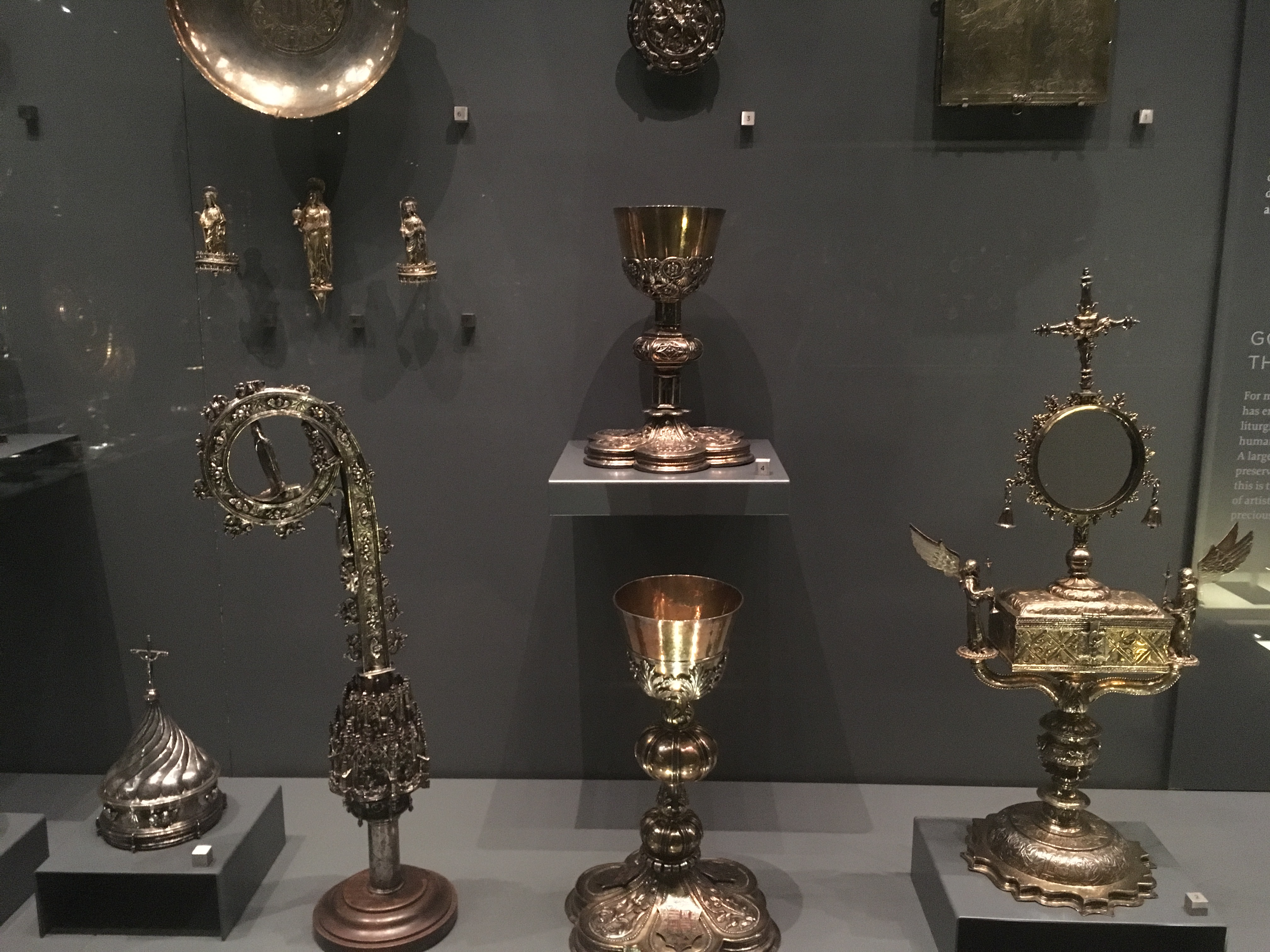
Religious objects

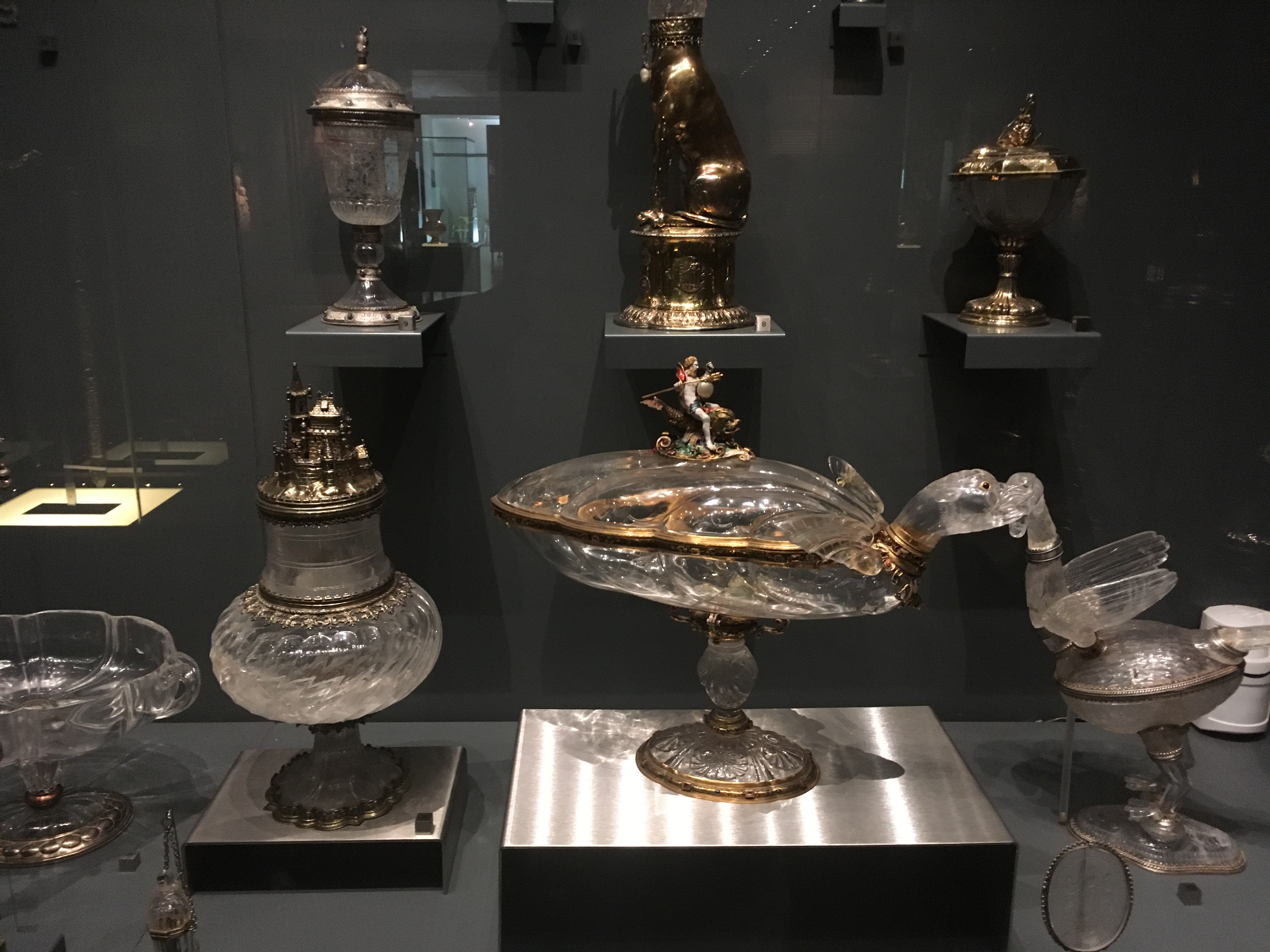
Crystal glassware
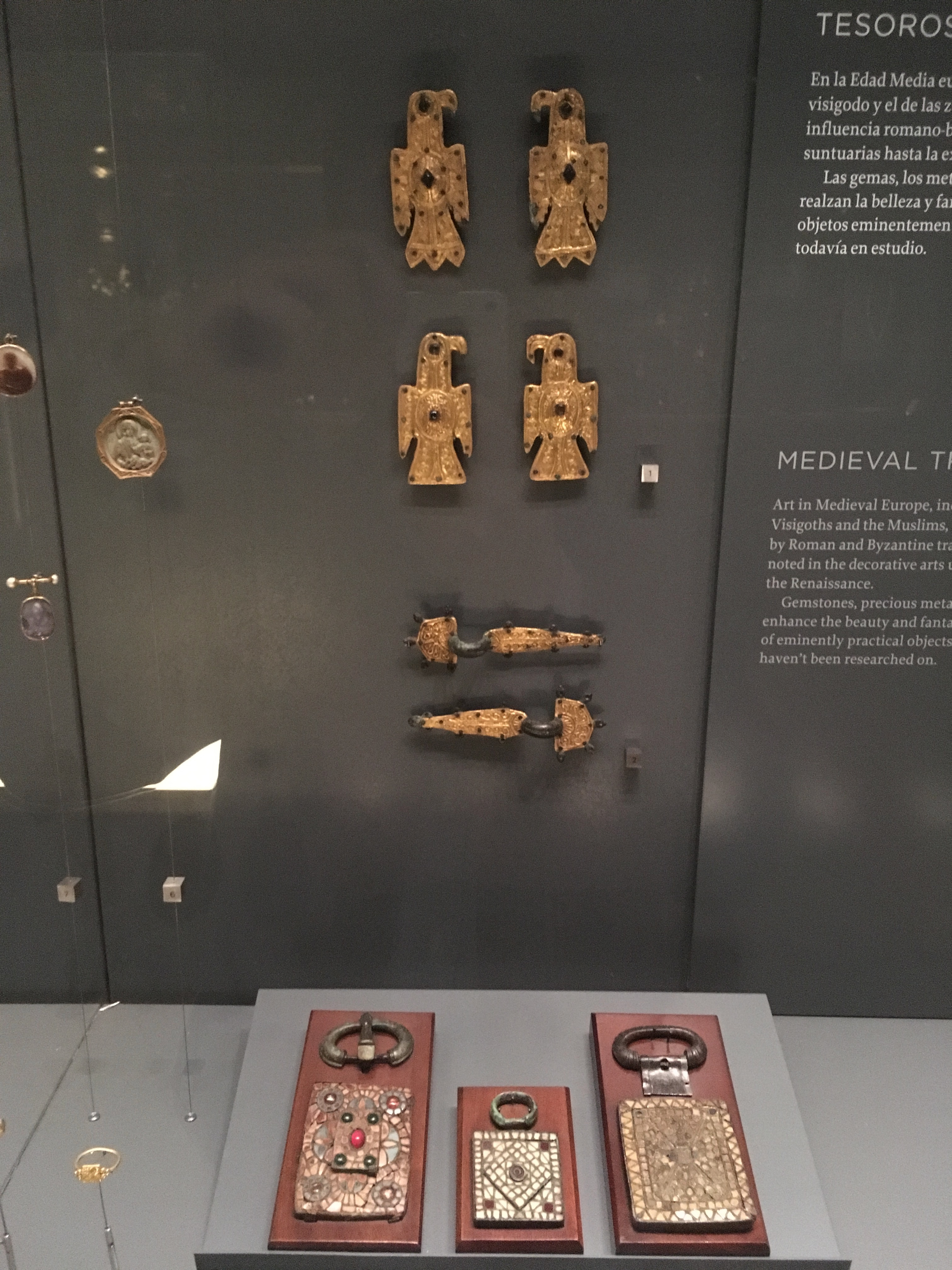
Visigothic fibulae, 6th century

== Painting collection ==
The painting collection includes work by artists such as George Romney, John Constable (Landscape of Flatford), Nicolaes Maes (one female portrait), David Teniers the Younger, Erasmus Quellinus II (The Virgin and the Child), Giulio Clovio (one miniature on vellum), Bernardo Cavallino (St. Stephen), Lorenzo Tiepolo, Joshua Reynolds, Francisco Zurbarán, Lucas Cranach the Elder, Hieronymus Bosch, Diego de Velázquez, Francisco de Goya, Bartolomé Esteban Murillo, Luis Paret, El Greco and Federico de Madrazo.

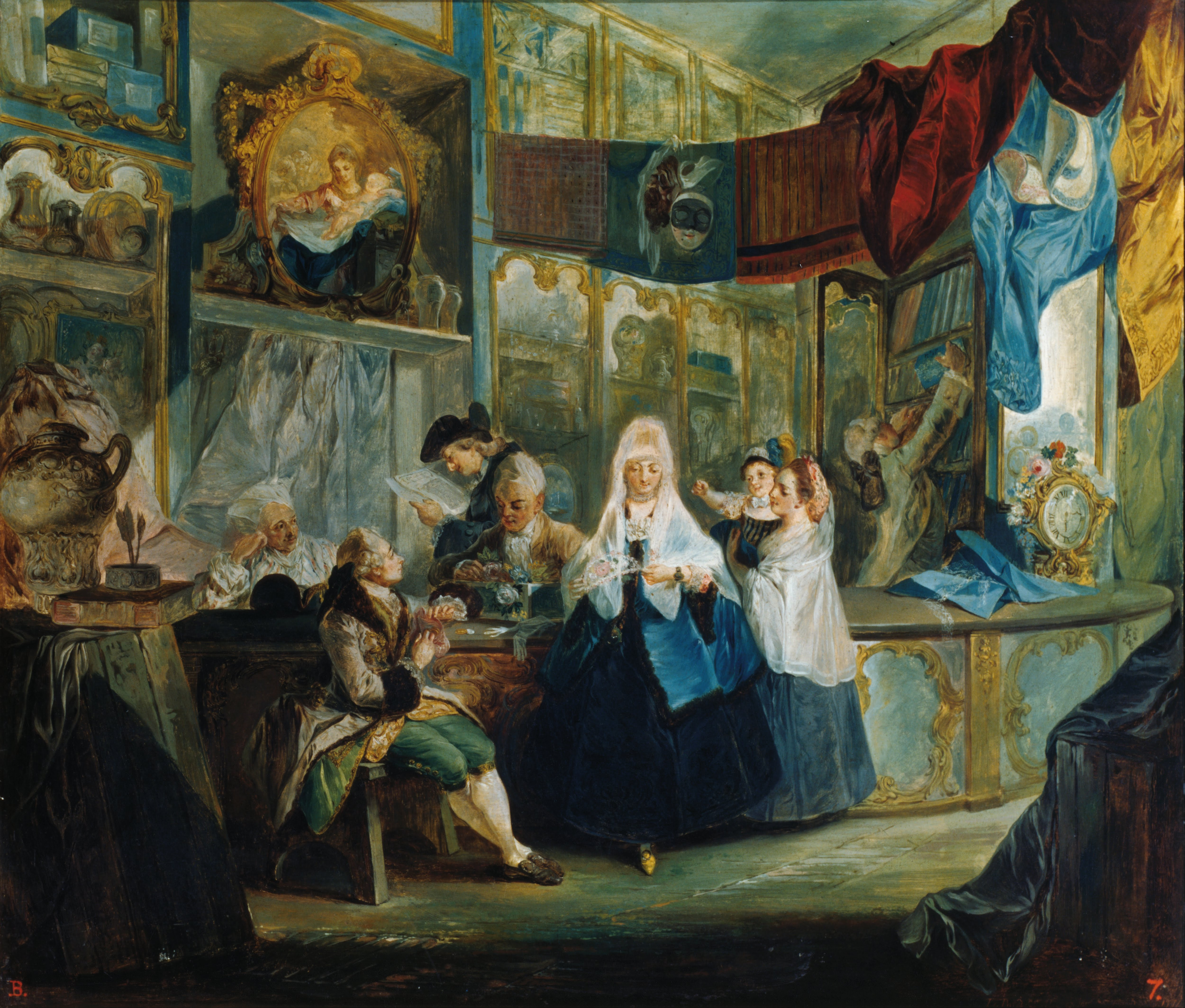
Luis Paret, The Shop, 1772
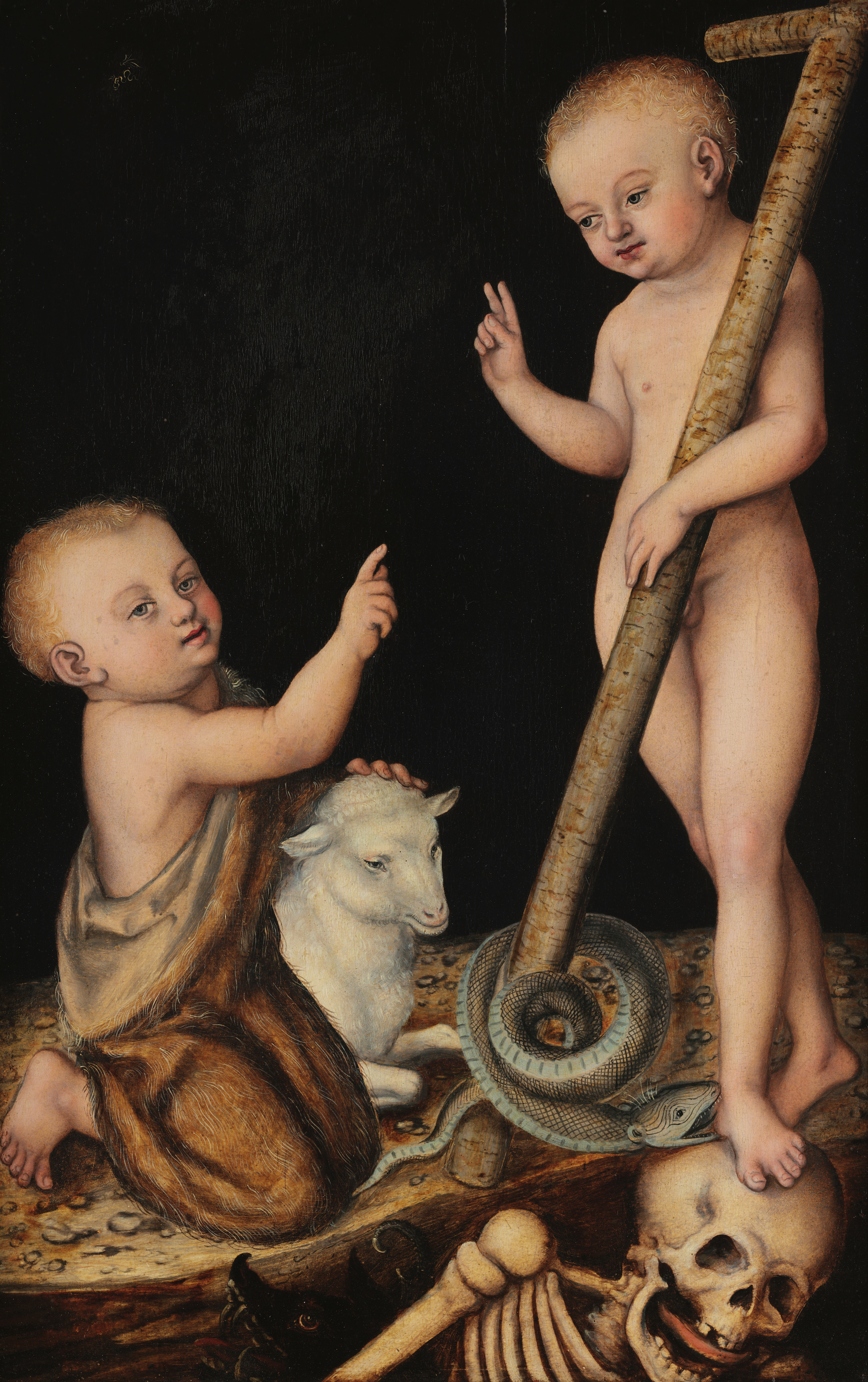
Lucas Cranach the Elder, Adoration of The Child Jesus by St John the Baptist, c. 1530–1540

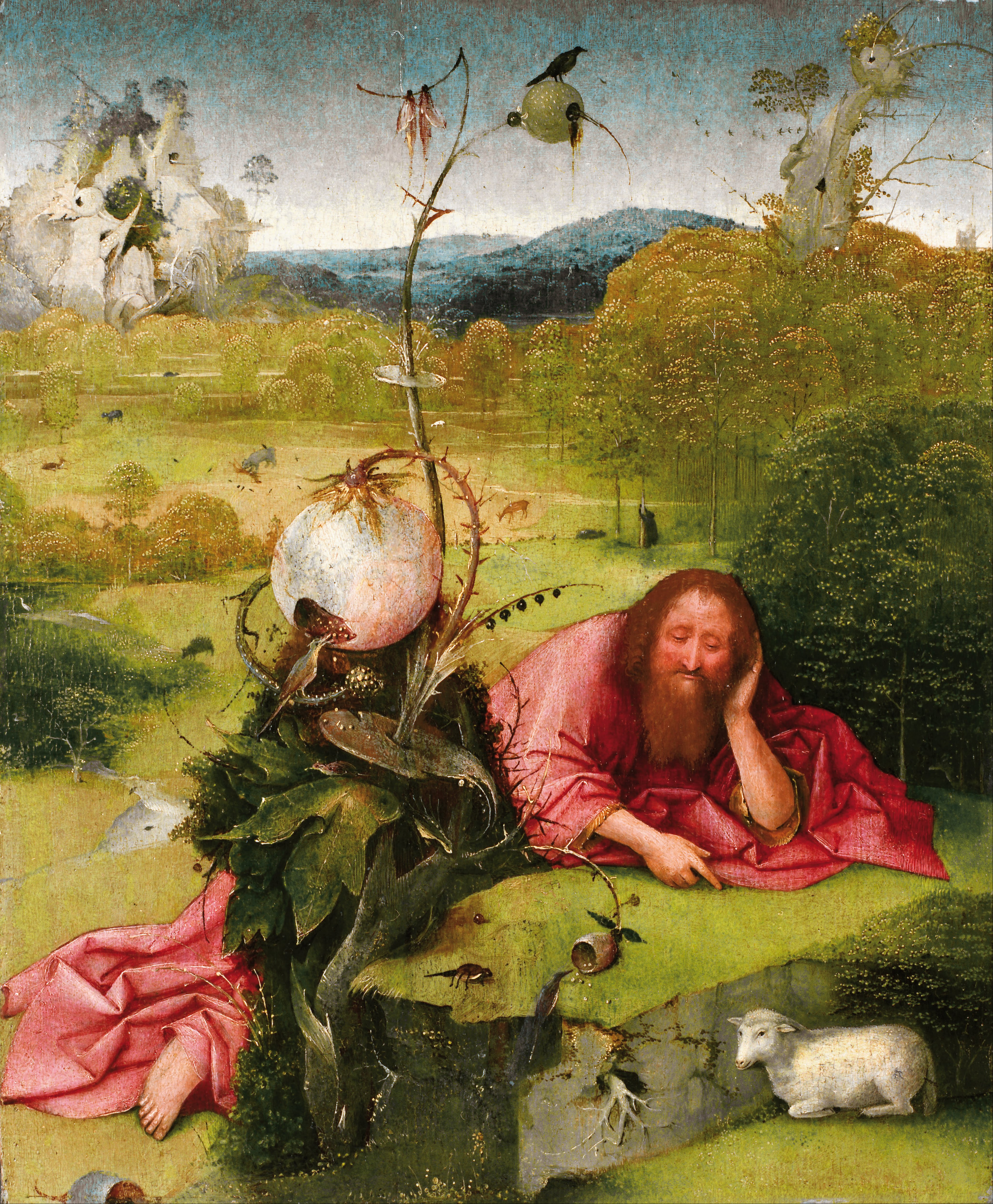
Hieronymus Bosch, St. John the Baptist in the Wilderness, c. 1489

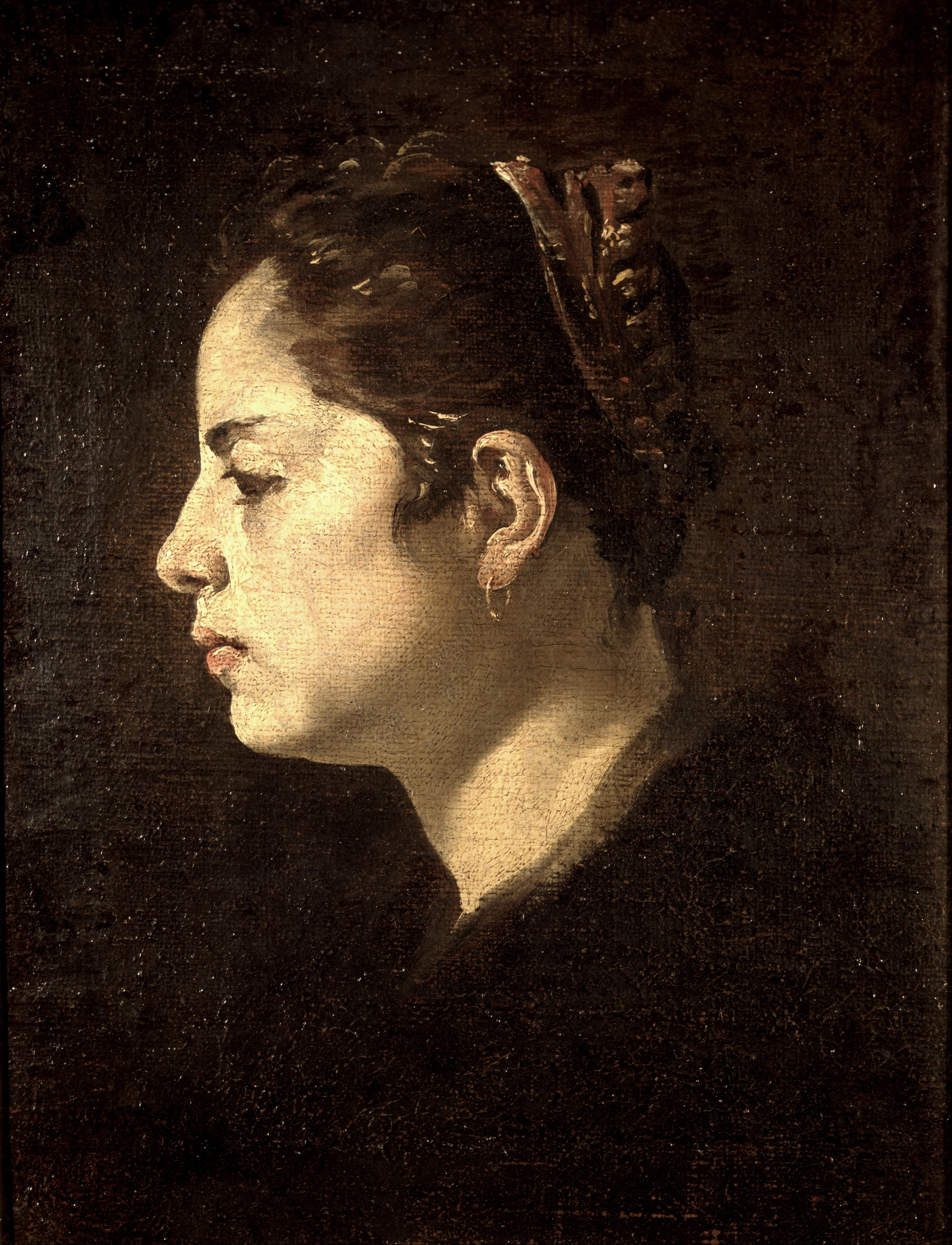
Diego de Velázquez, Head of a Girl, c. 1620–1624

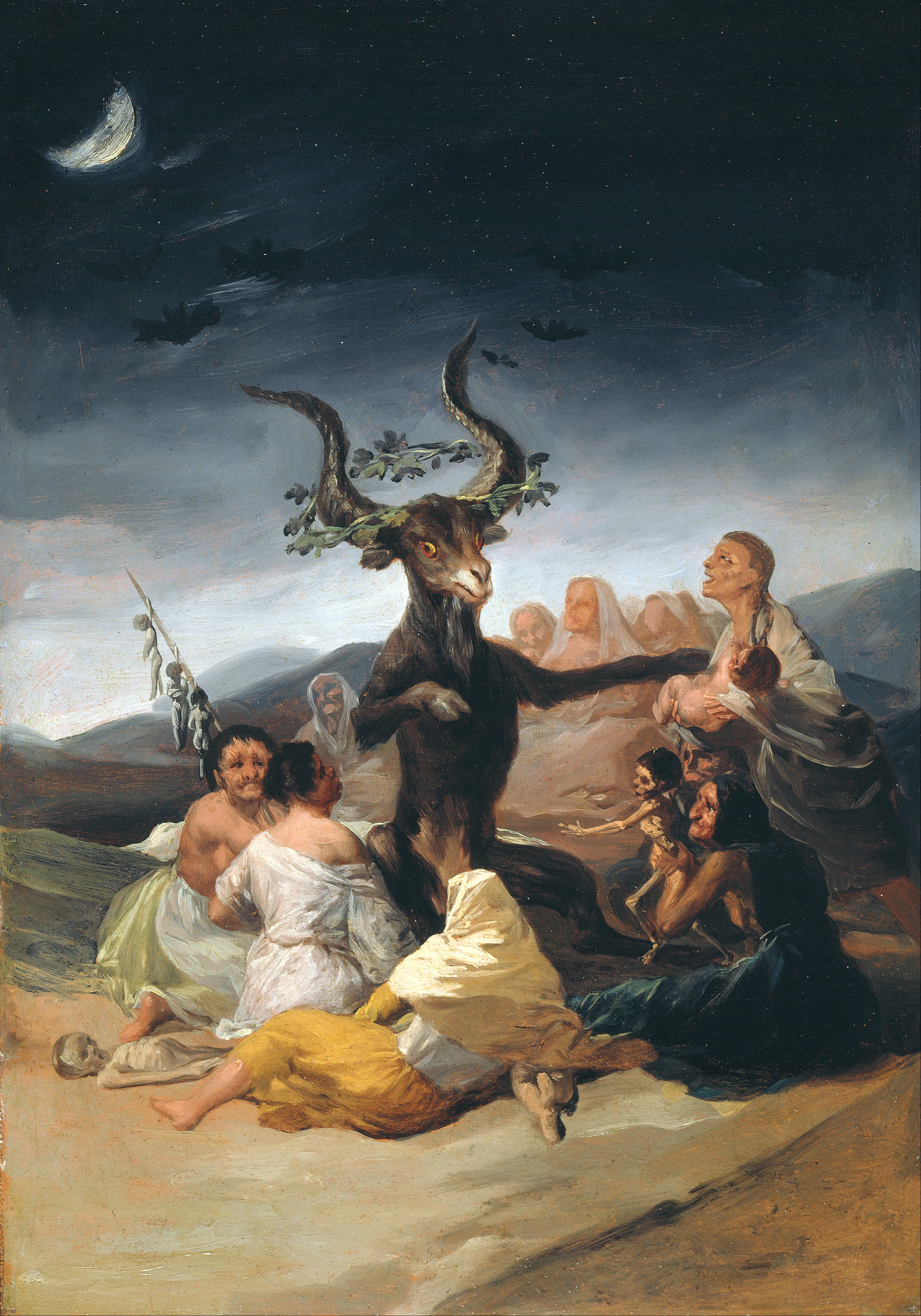
Francisco Goya, Witches' Sabbath, 1798

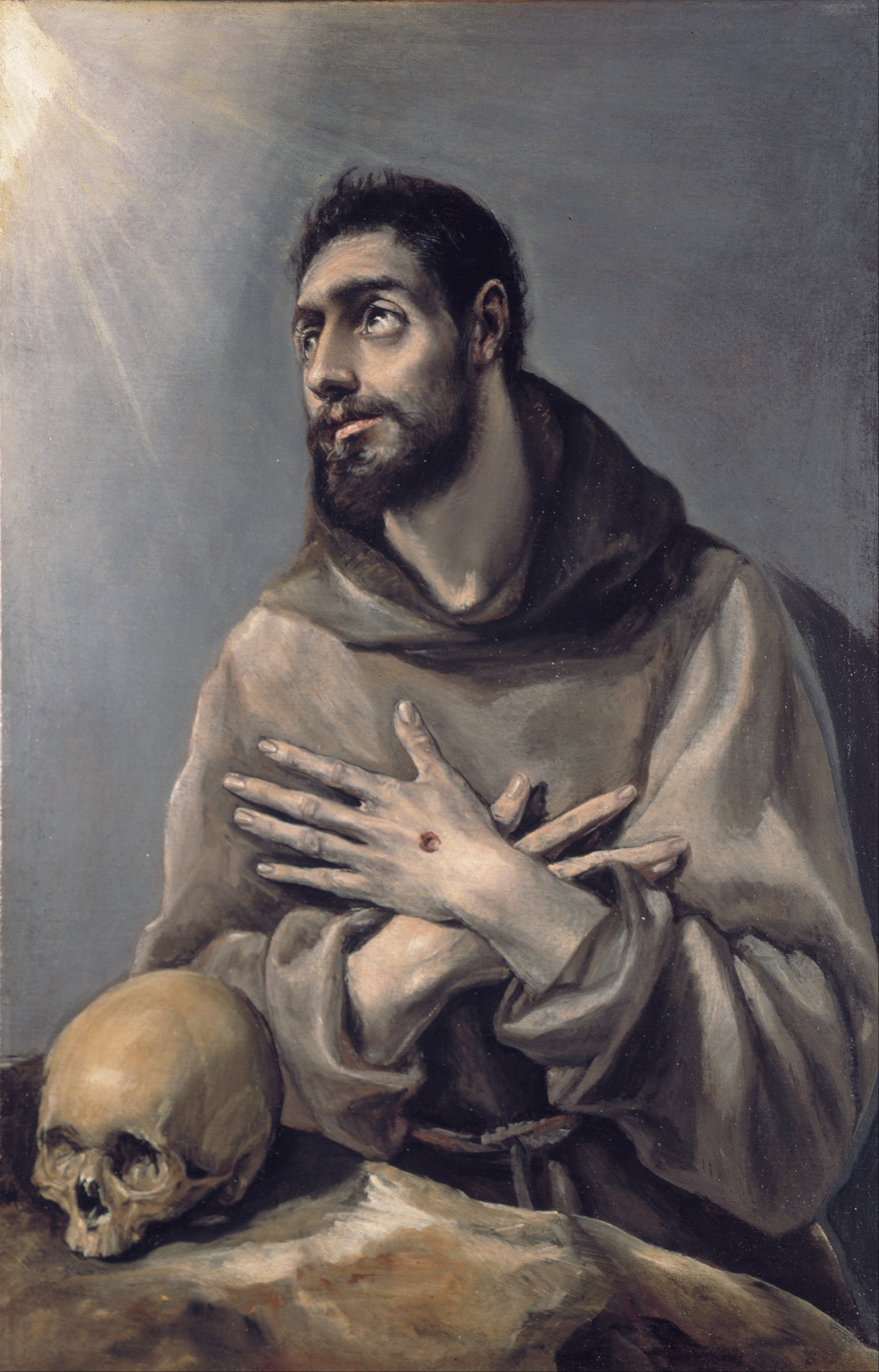
El Greco, Saint Francis in ecstasy, c. 1577–1580

Bartolomé Esteban Murillo, Saint Rose of Lima, c. 1670
