= St Margaret and the Dragon =

St Margaret and the Dragon may refer to:

- St Margaret and the Dragon (Raphael)
- St Margaret and the Dragon (Titian)
