= Saint Margaret and the Dragon =

Saint Margaret and the Dragon may refer to:

- Saint Margaret and the Dragon (Raphael), 1518
- Saint Margaret and the Dragon (Titian), c. 1559
