= Gallery of Archduke Leopold Wilhelm in Brussels (Schleissheim) =

Painting by David Teniers the Younger

Archduke Leopold Wilhelm in his Gallery in Brussels (IV)
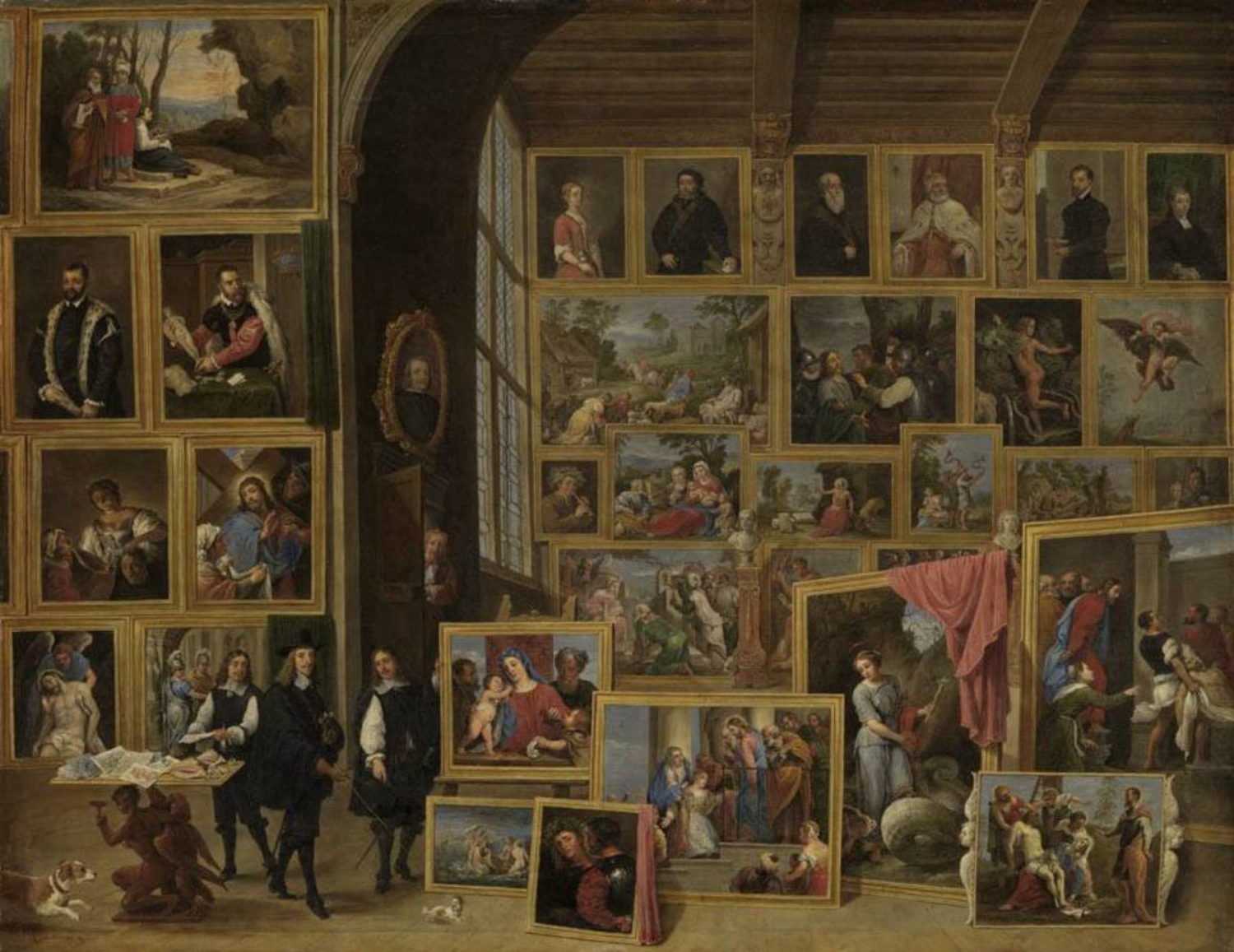
- Artist: David Teniers the Younger
- Year: 1650s
- Dimensions: 99.7 cm (39.3 in) × 128.4 cm (50.6 in)
- Location: State Gallery in the New Schleißheim Palace
- Accession no.: 1841
- Identifiers: RKDimages ID: 57564; Bildindex der Kunst und Architektur ID: 00060263

Gallery of Archduke Leopold Wilhelm in Brussels is a painting of Archduke Leopold Wilhelm's Italian art collection by the Flemish Baroque painter David Teniers the Younger, now held in the Schleissheim Palace. It dates to the 1650s.

The painting shows the Archduke as a collector pointing with his cane towards a few paintings propped against each other on the floor. Behind him is the artist wearing a gold chain and sword, the attributes of honor for his role as gallery director for the archduke. Above the door is a portrait of another patron of the artist, King Philip IV of Spain, and behind the large paintings on the right is a bust on a pedestal of Queen Christina of Sweden. On the left behind the table is an assistant holding a print. The table foot has been documented as a creation of the sculptor Adriaen de Vries depicting Ganymede. The paintings are arranged in rows on the walls, and is one of the paintings that David Teniers the Younger prepared to document the Archduke's collection before he employed 12 engravers to publish his Theatrum Pictorium, considered the "first illustrated art catalog". He published this book of engravings after the Archduke had moved to Austria and taken his collection with him. It was published in Antwerp in 1659 and again in 1673.

In her catalog raisonné of Teniers' works, Margret Klinge dates this painting after 1654 because in the similar gallery painting dated 1653 his portrait does not show the keys, chain, and sword that he is shown wearing in the portrait by Philips Fruytiers dated 1655. Furthermore, the painting of The Three Philosophers and several other Italian paintings are painted in mirror image, which may indicate that he was working from his miniature copy rather than the original, which would have been a necessity after the Archduke left Brussels with his collection to return to Vienna in 1656.

== List of paintings depicted ==
The following is a list of the recognizable paintings of the collection, not all of which were included in the Italian catalog prepared by Teniers, which was a selection of 243 of the most prized paintings out of a collection of 1300-1400 pieces. Many are still in the Viennese collection. Here is a list of the paintings depicted, which starts with the paintings at the top left, running from left to right and from top to bottom and continuing in the same way with the rear wall on the right.

image	article	painter	year	collection	inventory nr.	catalog code
	The Three Philosophers	Giorgione	1500s	Kunsthistorisches Museum	GG_111	20
	Man with Ermine Coat	Titian	1560	Kunsthistorisches Museum	GG_76	95
	Portrait of Jacopo Strada	Titian	1567	Kunsthistorisches Museum	GG_81	92
	Judith with the head of Holofernes	Carlo Saraceni	1613	Kunsthistorisches Museum	GG_41	39
	Christ carrying the cross meets Veronica	Jacopo Bassano				144
	Dead Christ Supported by an Angel	Palma il Giovane	1612	Kunsthistorisches Museum	GG_9394	179
	Aeneas Takes Leave of Dido	Andrea Schiavone	1555	Kunsthistorisches Museum	GG_5818	135
	King Philip IV of Spain	unknown	1653	Kunsthistorisches Museum	GG_324	
	Lady with an Ermine	Titian				94
	Portrait of a Man with Beret	anonymous	1538	Kunsthistorisches Museum	GG_1552	56
	Portrait of a White-Bearded Man	Tintoretto		Kunsthistorisches Museum	GG_25	103
	Portrait of Francesco Donato, Doge of Venice	anonymous		Kunsthistorisches Museum	GG_3062	98
	The Orator Giovan Pietro Maffeis (?) (1533-1603)	Giovanni Battista Moroni	1563	Kunsthistorisches Museum	GG_88	230
	Portrait of a Lady					229
	An Allegory of Spring	David Teniers the Younger	1656	private collection		163
	Arrest of Christ	Bartolomeo Manfredi	1615	National Museum of Western Art		234
	Pluto in his Chariot	anonymous	1536	Kunsthistorisches Museum	GG_157	26
	Ganymede	Jan Swart van Groningen	1560	private collection		11
	Boy with a Flute	Francesco Bassano the Younger	1583	Kunsthistorisches Museum	GG_8	150
	Holy Family with St. John and Mary Magdalene	Palma Vecchio	1520	Uffizi	950	205
	Saint Jerome	Dosso Dossi	1620s	Kunsthistorisches Museum	GG_263	232
	Jupiter nurtured by Amalthea	Andrea Schiavone	1544	Kunsthistorisches Museum	GG_1991	128
	Blind leading the Blind	Domenico Fetti	1620s	Staatliche Kunstsammlungen Dresden	422	215
	Saints George and Cecilia (after Antonello da Messina)	David Teniers the Younger	1656	Courtauld Gallery	P.1978.PG.439	6
	Adoration of the Magi	Jacopo Bassano	1555	Kunsthistorisches Museum	GG_361	153
	Cain Kills Abel	Bartolomeo Manfredi	c 1600	Kunsthistorisches Museum	GG_363	
	Lamentation with angels	Palma il Giovane	1610s	Kunsthistorisches Museum	GG_1546	198
	Madonna of the Cherries	Titian	1516	Kunsthistorisches Museum	GG_118	62
	Raising the Young Man of Nain	Paolo Veronese	1560s	Kunsthistorisches Museum	GG_52	124
	Saint Margaret and the Dragon	Raphael	1518	Kunsthistorisches Museum	GG_171	2
	Carrying Lazarus	Pordenone	before 1551	Prague Castle Picture Gallery		110
	Hero mourns the dead Leander	Domenico Fetti	1622	Kunsthistorisches Museum	GG_160	217
	The Bravo	Titian	1520	Kunsthistorisches Museum	GG_64	23
	Descent from the Cross	Tintoretto	1547	Kunsthistorisches Museum	GG_1565	109
