= Cornelis Schut =

Flemish painter, engraver and tapestry designer (1597–1655)

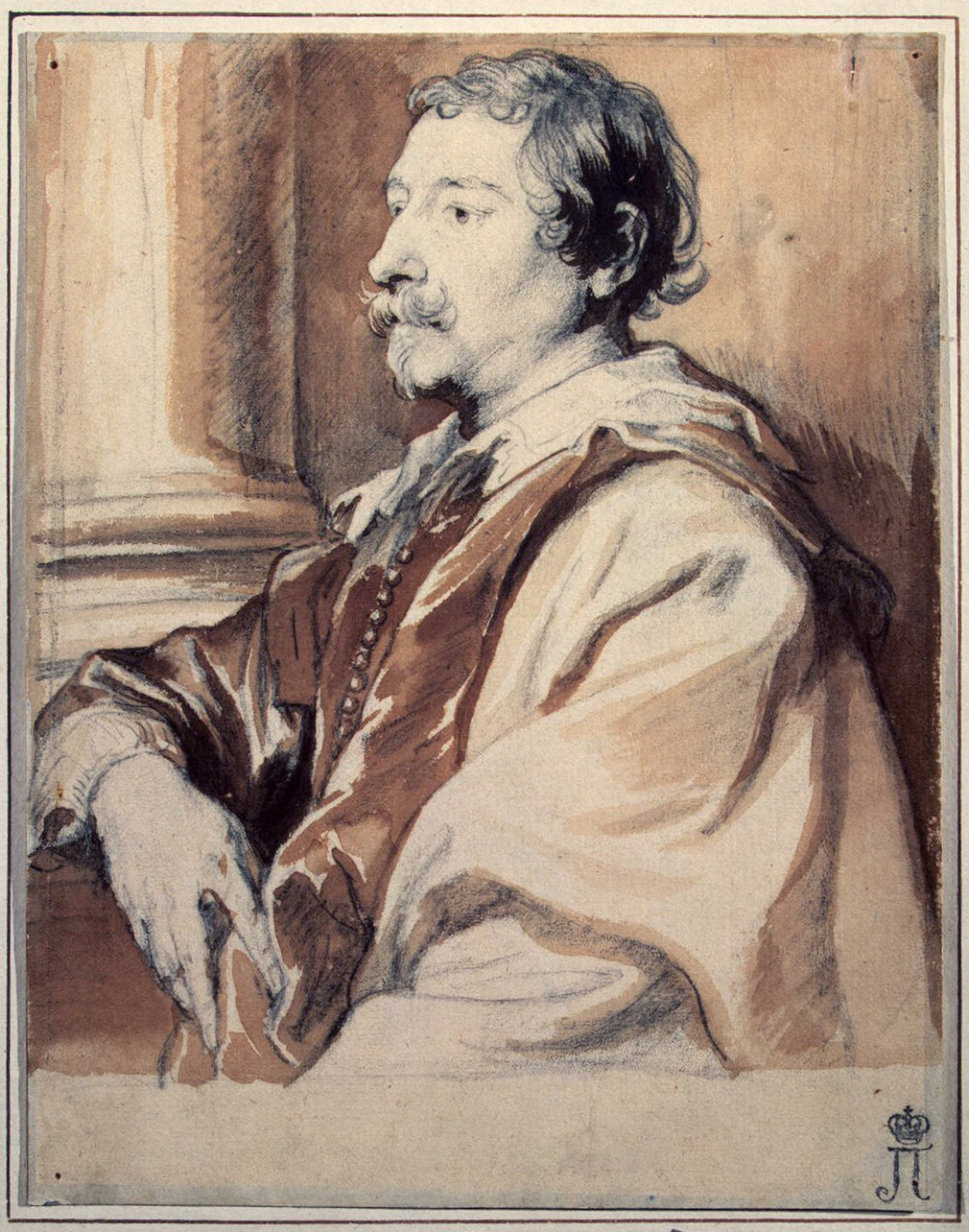
Cornelis Schut by Anthony van Dyck

Cornelis Schut (13 May 1597 – 29 April 1655) was a Flemish painter, draughtsman, engraver and tapestry designer who specialized in religious and mythological scenes. Presumed to have trained under Rubens, he treated Counter-Reformation subjects in a High-Baroque style. After a stay in Italy, he worked mainly in Antwerp where he was one of the leading history painters in the first half of the 17th century.

== Life ==
Cornelis Schut was born in Antwerp in the Duchy of Brabant as the son of Willem Schut and Suzanna Schernilla. There are no records about his artistic training. He is first mentioned as a pupil of Peter Paul Rubens by the 18th century historian Jacob Campo Weyerman. Although the scientific relevance of Weyerman's sources is questioned, it is still assumed that Schut was a pupil of Rubens since Rubens was exempted from registering his pupils with the Antwerp Guild of St Luke. Because Schut's early works are closer to the style of the leading Antwerp history painter Abraham Janssens, some connection with the workshop of Abraham Janssens may have existed although it does not prove he was Janssens' pupil. Schut became a master of the Antwerp Guild of St Luke in 1618.

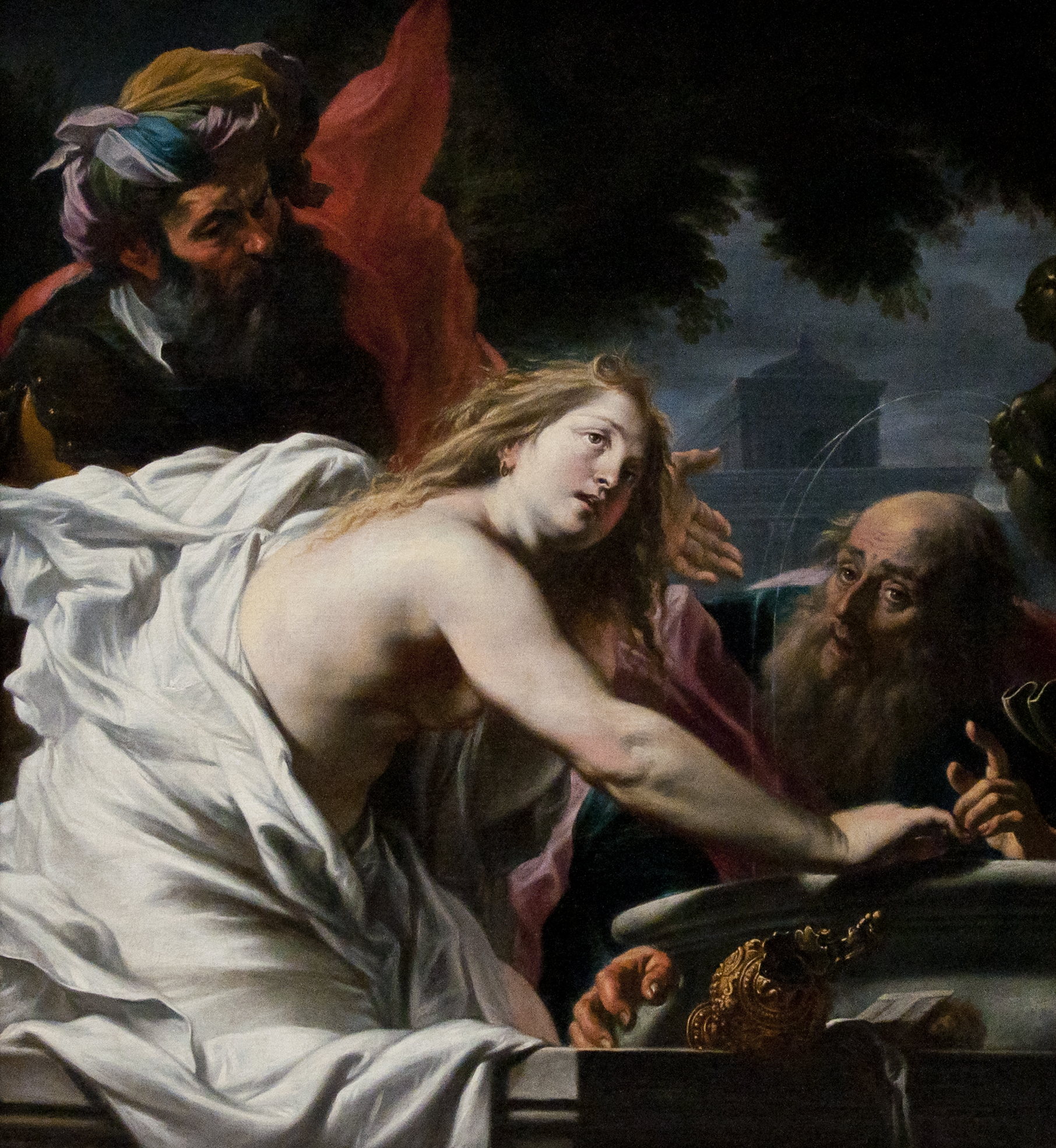
Susanna and the Elders

Schut left for Italy shortly after 1618. While in Rome, he was a founding member of the Bentvueghels, an association of mainly Dutch and Flemish artists working in Rome. It became customary for the Bentvueghels to adopt an appealing nickname, the so-called 'bent name'. Schut took the nickname Broodzak (bread bag).

From 13 January 1627 he worked on frescoes in the villa "Casino Pescatore" located in Frascati near Rome, owned by Pietro Pescatore (aka Pieter de Visschere or Pieter Visschere), a wealthy Italian banker and patron originally from Flanders. He collaborated on this project with the Dutch painter and Bentvueghels member Tyman Arentsz. Cracht. This commission was instrumental in launching Schut's career in Italy as Pescatori was rich and influential and keen to help his compatriots in Italy. Another important patron in Rome was the aristocratic Italian banker and art collector Vincenzo Giustiniani who commissioned two large religious compositions from him (now in the Abbey of Sainte-Trinité, Caen). This patronage clearly demonstrated the esteem which Schut enjoyed in Rome. He also attracted the attention of the young Poussin then residing in Rome in the residence of the Flemish sculptor François Duquesnoy. Poussin's early works borrowed some motifs from Schut's works made for Vincenzo Giustiniani.

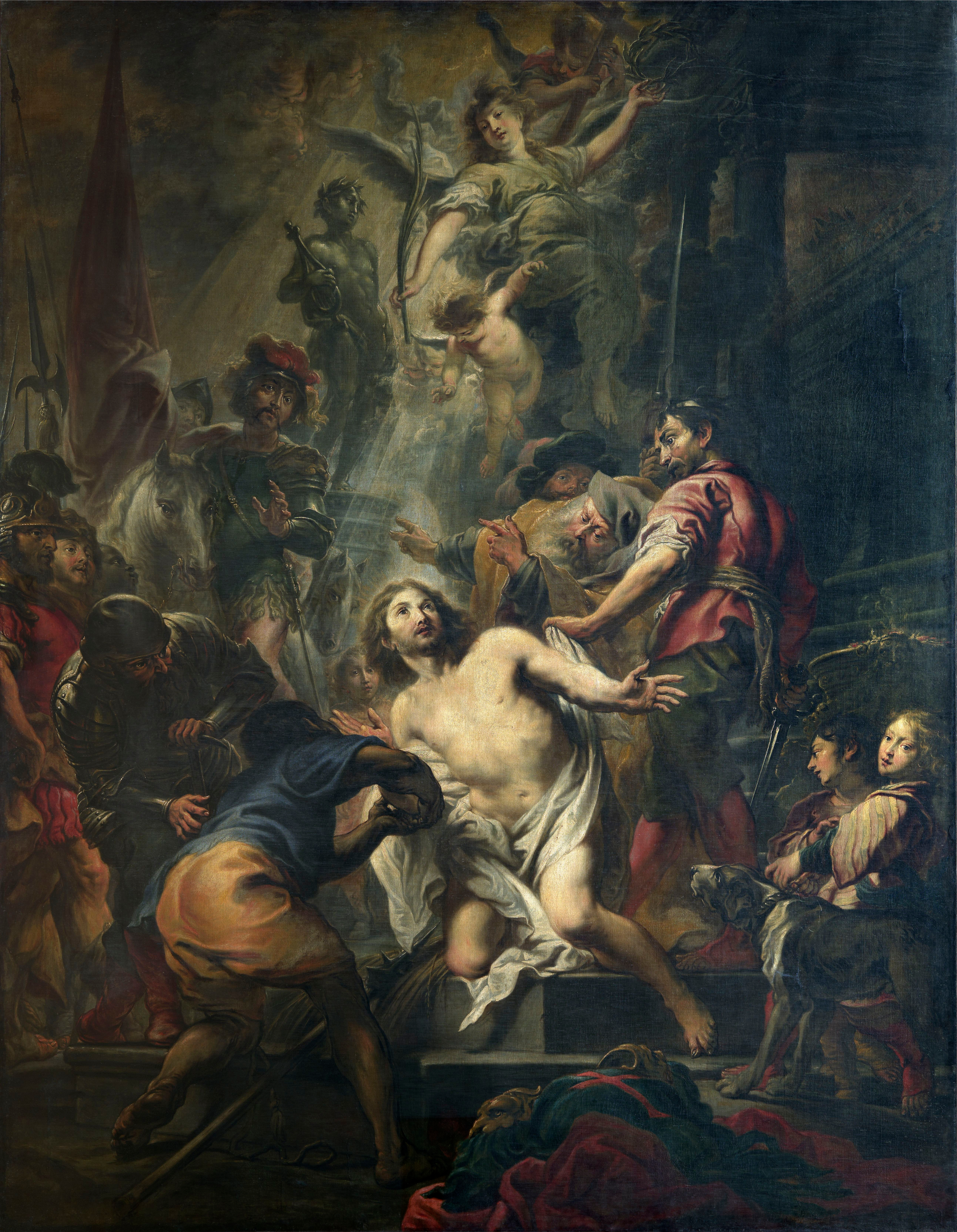
The martyrdom of St George

Schut's plans in Rome were disrupted when on 16 September 1627 he was imprisoned for the killing of a fellow artist by the name of Giusto. His jail time was short as on 2 October he was already released thanks to the intervention of the Accademia di San Luca, the association of artists in Rome. He then left Rome and was reported in 1627–28 in Florence. He is known to have designed tapestries for the Arazzeria Medicea, the most important tapestry factory in Italy founded in 1546 in Florence by the Medici grand duke Cosimo I.

His movements after this time are unclear. He resurfaced in September 1631 in Antwerp when he appeared before a notary to draw up marital conditions. On 7 October 1631 Cornelis Schut married Catharina Gheenssins, who was from a well-off family. His wife died on 29 September 1637 leaving the artist with three children of whom two died young. The artist remarried the next year with Anastasia Scelliers with whom he had two sons and two daughters.

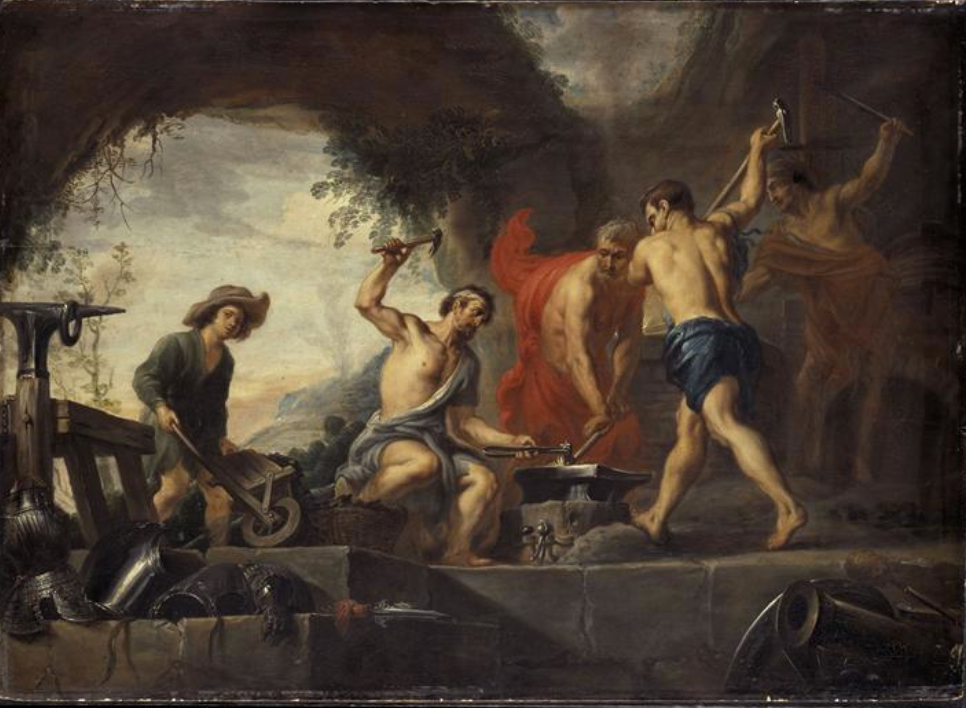
Vulcan's forge

Schut enjoyed artistic success upon his return to Antwerp where he produced mainly altarpieces for the local churches. He painted in the High-Baroque style that had become popular in Flanders by that time. In particular his ability to produce ceiling decorations in the monumental Italian style, with its typical illusionistic character, was regarded highly by patrons in his home country. An example of this is his Assumption of Mary in Antwerp Cathedral.

Schut played a prominent role in the decorative project at the occasion of the Royal Entry of the Cardinal-Infante Ferdinand in 1635 in both Antwerp (where Rubens was in charge of the overall artistic design) and Ghent. He collaborated with Gaspard de Crayer, Nicolas Roose, Jan Stadius and Theodoor Rombouts on these projects. The Ghent magistrate commissioned Schut to draw and engrave all the decorations that had been made for the Ghent Royal Entry. Schut supplied more than 100 etchings for this commission.

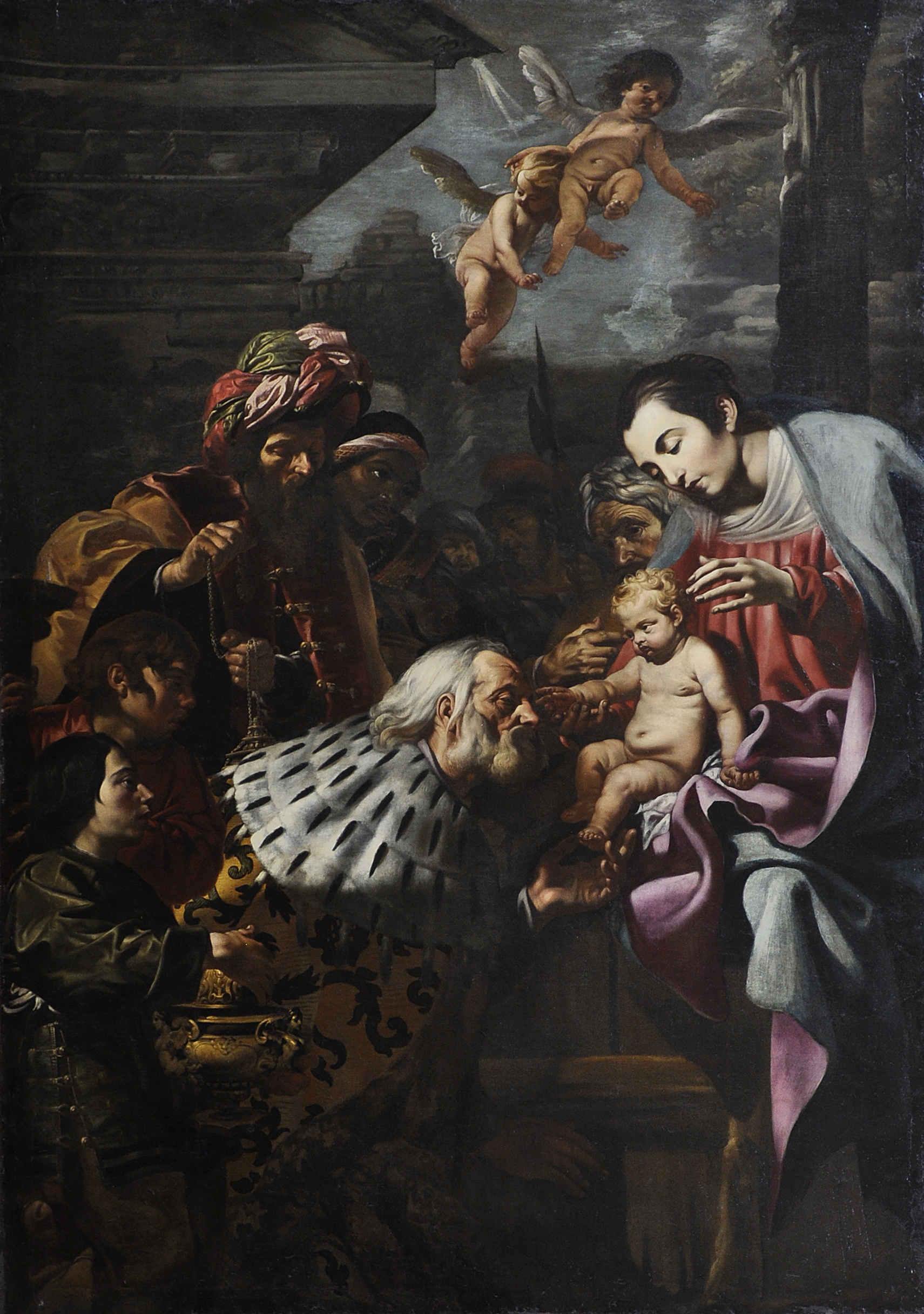
Adoration of the Magi

In 1643 the headmen of the Antwerp civil militia the Gilde of de Jonge Voetboog wrote out a competition for a new altarpiece for the militia's altar in the Antwerp Cathedral. Schut and Thomas Willeboirts Bosschaert were invited to submit for this competition a painting on the subject of the martyrdom of St George. Both works were exhibited and finally a panel of six judges, of which each artist had appointed three, ruled in favour of Schut.

Schut died in Antwerp on 29 April 1655 shortly after the death of his second wife. He was buried on 1 May 1655 in the Saint Willibrord Church in Antwerp in a grave shared with his second wife. The grave and its marble cenotaph are still present in the church.

Schut was the teacher of Ambrosius (II) Gast, Jan Baptist van den Kerckhoven, Philippe Vleughels, Hans Witdoeck and his cousin Cornelis Schut III.

== Works ==
=== General ===
Schut was a versatile artist who produced oil paintings, frescos, engravings, drawings and tapestry cartoons. He was principally a history painter of religious and mythological subjects.

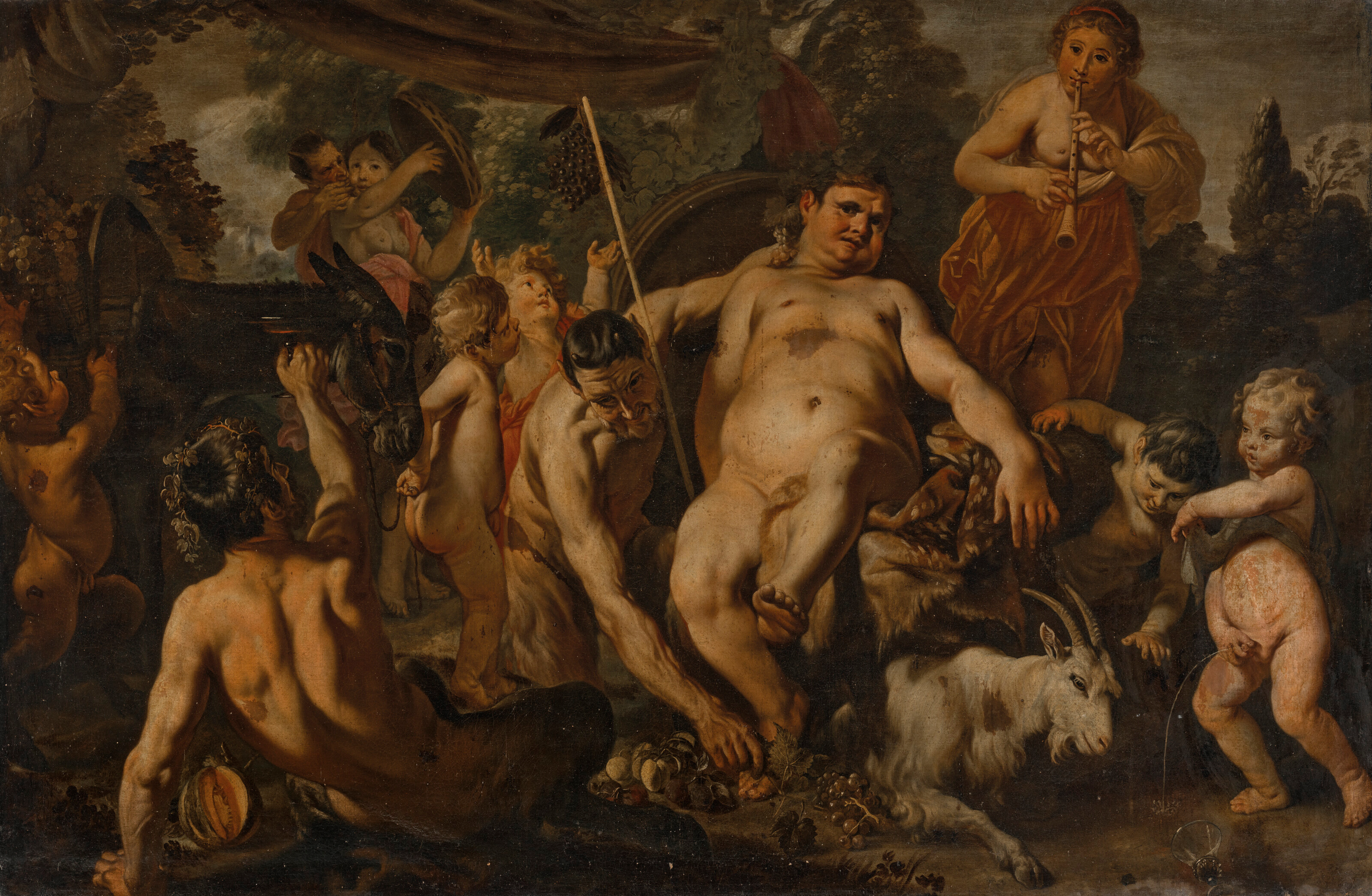
The Triumph of Bacchus

His early work shows the influence of Abraham Janssens. During his Italian sojourn in Rome during 1624 and Florence in 1627 he adopted elements of the High Baroque style of Pietro da Cortona, Guercino and classical tendencies informed by Domenichino and Guido Reni. This style is characterized among other things by a strong sense of animation and pathos, in which light and color play an important role. Elements of late mannerism are also evident. Schut's style, which is characterized by strong foreshortening, sharp contrasts of light and extreme facial expressions has some affinity with the work of Federico Barocci, who played a major role in the evolution of baroque painting. This is particularly evident in his work in Antwerp starting from c. 1630 (or possibly somewhat earlier) where the style of Barocci is recognizable in the spatial effects, the unstable and emotive poses and the flashing lighting effects. His Martyrdom of St George painted in 1643 for the competition with Thomas Willeboirts Bosschaert is close to Barocci's Martyrdom of St Vitalis. Schut's style hardly changed in his later career, except that his colors became less intense and his brushwork somewhat looser.

Other than in some motifs and compositional arrangements, Schut's work displays little stylistic resemblance to that of Rubens. Schut's skill in interpreting the themes of the Counter-Reformation led to many commissions for altarpieces in churches and monasteries in Antwerp, Brussels, Ghent, Bruges and Cologne.

=== Tapestry designs ===
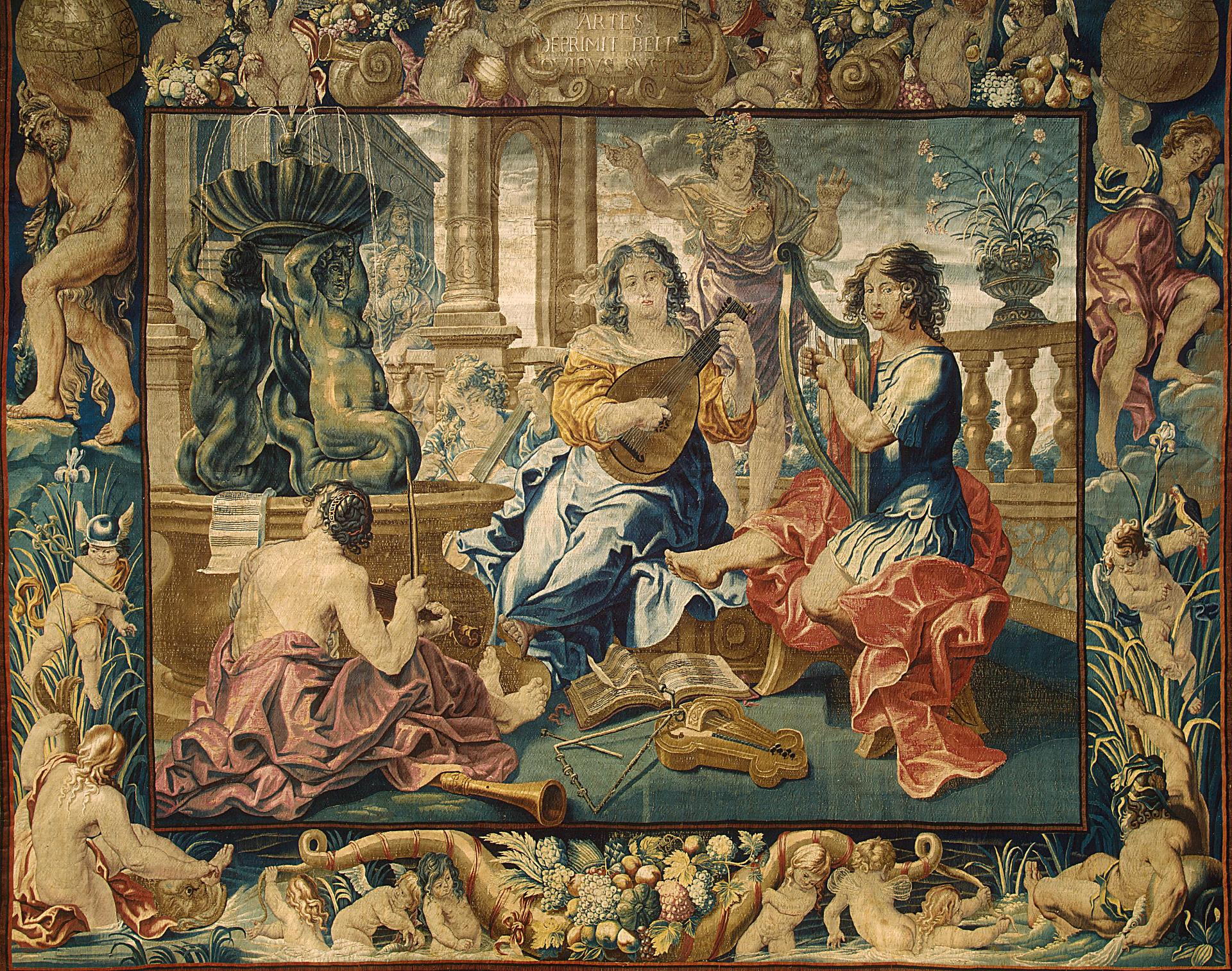
Music, from the tapestry series the Seven Liberal Arts

Schut created some very inventive designs on mythological and allegorical subjects in his cartoons for the Seven Liberal Arts, a series of tapestries. The series consisted of 8 tapestries, seven dedicated to each of the liberal arts plus one depicting their combined apotheosis. Together, the series can be interpreted as an allegory of war and peace. An example of a tapestry in the series is the Allegory of Music (Hermitage Museum). In the centre of the upper border of this tapestry is a cartouche with the inscription: Artes Deprifit bellum agvibus sustinatus ("War oppresses the arts which support it"), also designed by Cornelis Schut. The cartoons were woven repeatedly in Bruges between 1655 and 1675. They were also woven in the Brussels workshops.

=== Collaborations ===
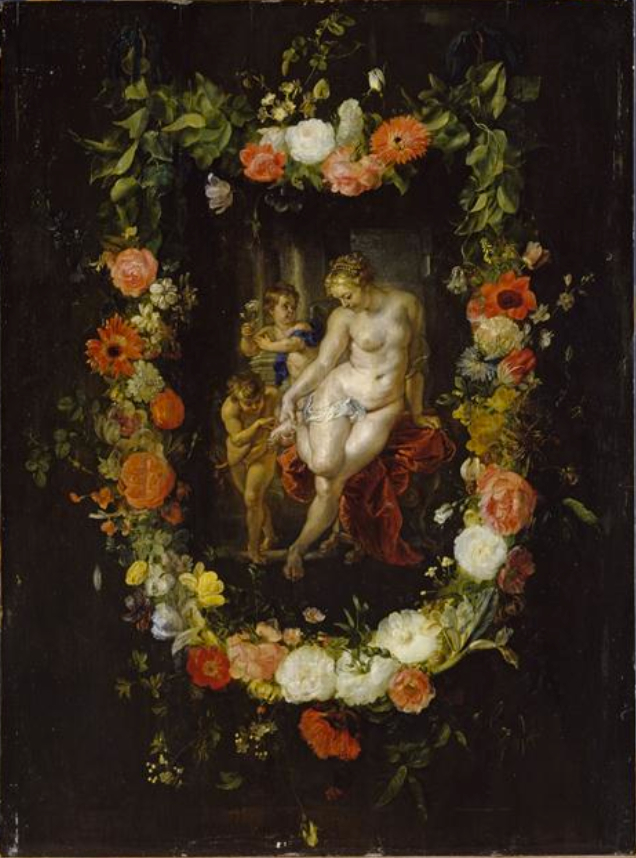
Birth of the red rose

As was common in 17th-century Antwerp, Schut often collaborated with other artists who were specialist painters. He added figures to the compositions of the painter of church interiors Pieter Neefs the Elder. Schut collaborated with flower painters such as Daniel Seghers and Frans Ykens on so-called 'garland paintings'. Garland paintings are a type of still life invented in Antwerp and whose earliest practitioner was Jan Brueghel the Elder. These paintings typically show a flower garland around a devotional image or portrait. Garland paintings were usually collaborations between a still life and a figure painter. An example of a collaboration between Schut and a flower painter on a garland painting is the composition Birth of the red rose (Staatliches Museum Schwerin) in which the figures in the center were painted by Schut and the flower garland was painted by Frans Ykens.

His compositions were engraved by leading Antwerp engravers including Hans Witdoeck, Wenceslaus Hollar and Lucas Vorsterman although he was an accomplished etcher himself. Cornelis made etchings after his own works. For instance, he made a series of etchings on the theme of the liberal arts which are similar to his designs for cartoons on the same subject. He also created many small, decorative etchings of naked children or putti.

=== Collections ===
Works by Cornelis Schut are in the collections of the Royal Museum of Fine Arts Antwerp, the Metropolitan Museum of Art, New York City and the Art Museum of Estonia, Tallinn.
