= Marinus Robyn van der Goes =

Flemish engraver (1599-1639)

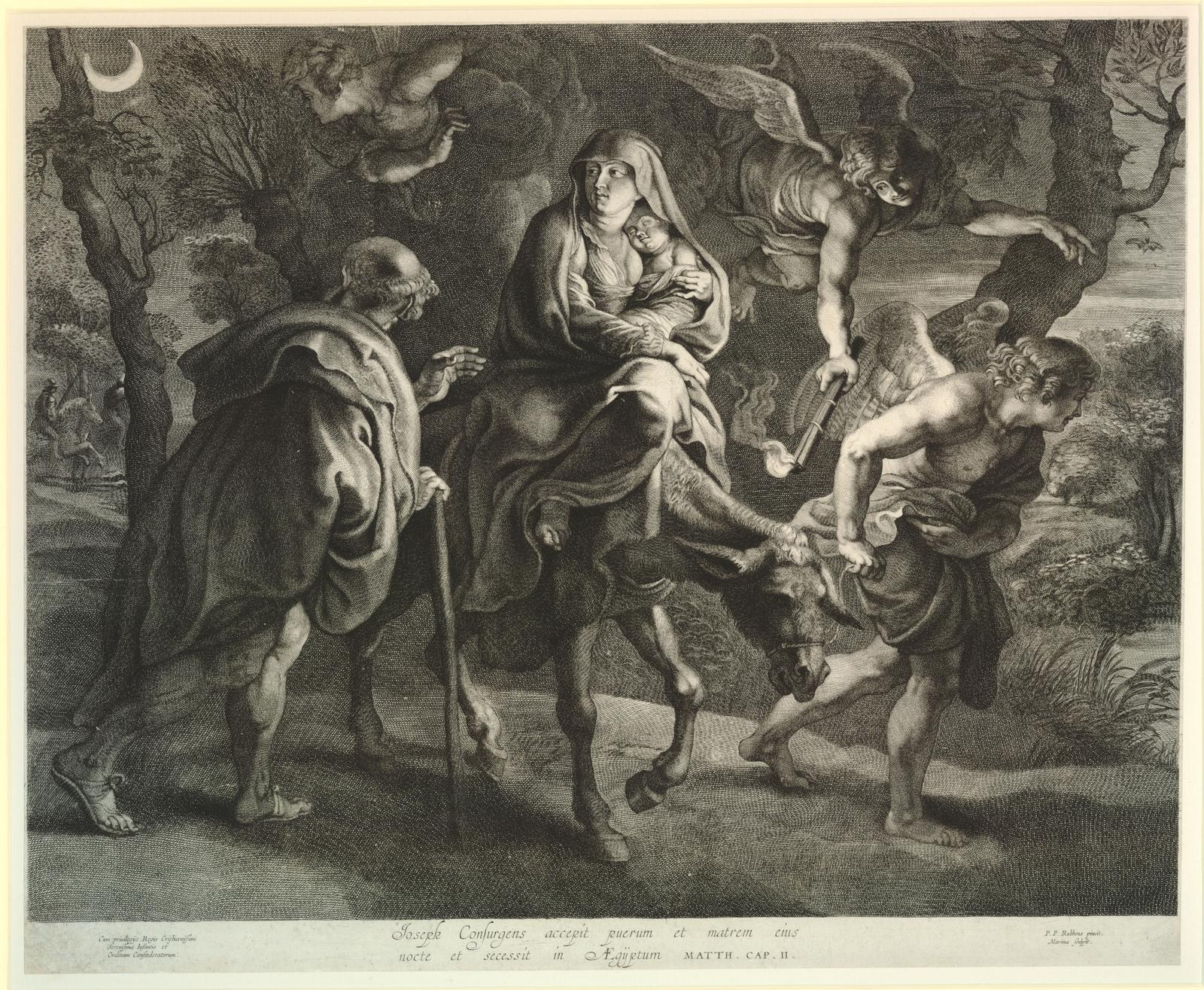
The Flight into Egypt

Marinus Robyn van der Goes or Marinus van der Goes (Goes or London?, 1599 - Antwerp, 1639) was a Flemish engraver. He was active as a reproductive engraver after the works of Flemish and Dutch designers.

== Life ==
Historical data about van der Goes’ life are scarce. He was together with Hans Witdoeck a pupil of Lucas Vorsterman during the years 1630–31. He was admitted as a master of the Guild of St. Luke of Antwerp in 1632–1633. He had three pupils: Alexander Goubau, Antonius Coolberger and Gaspard Leemans.

He died on 27 April 1639 in Antwerp and was buried in the local St. James' Church. In the burial register of the parish he was referred to as 'Marin van der Goes'.

== Works ==
He worked as an engraver for the leading Flemish painters of his age. In Rubens' studio he belonged to the 'new generation' of engravers with the likes of Hans Witdoeck. There are 18 engravings made by van der Goes on the basis of Rubens’ designs. The technique of van der Goes was more free than that of Vorsterman and was thus extremely well suited to the Rubens’ style. The burin is applied with great finesse and fairly tightly and preserves across the plate a transparency and lightness that allows van der Goes to achieve the correct effect through relatively tempered black tones.

He also made engravings after designs of prominent painters of his time such as Jacob Jordaens, Adriaen Brouwer, Hendrik Martenszoon Sorgh and Theodoor van Thulden. He signed all his engravings with Marinus.

== Bibliography ==
- H. HYMANS, Histoire de la gravure dans l’école de Rubens, Brussel, 1879, pp. 204, 408–13.
- J. R. JUDSON, C. VAN DE VELDE, Book Illustrations and Title-pages (1977), xxi of Corpus Rubenianum Ludwig Burchard, Brussel, 1968–, pp. 296–9.
- K. RENGER, G. UNVERFEHRT (eds.), Rubens in der Grafik, Göttingen, 1977, pp. 60–61.
- I. POHLEN, Untersuchungen zur Reproduction-Graphik der Rubens-Werkst., M. 1985.
- E. MAI en H. VLIEGHE (eds.), Von Bruegel bis Rubens, Keulen, 1993.
- N. VAN HOUT (red.), Copyright Rubens. Rubens en de grafiek, Gent/Antwerpen, 2004.
