= Jacob Neefs =

Flemish etcher, engraver and publisher (1610 - after 1660)

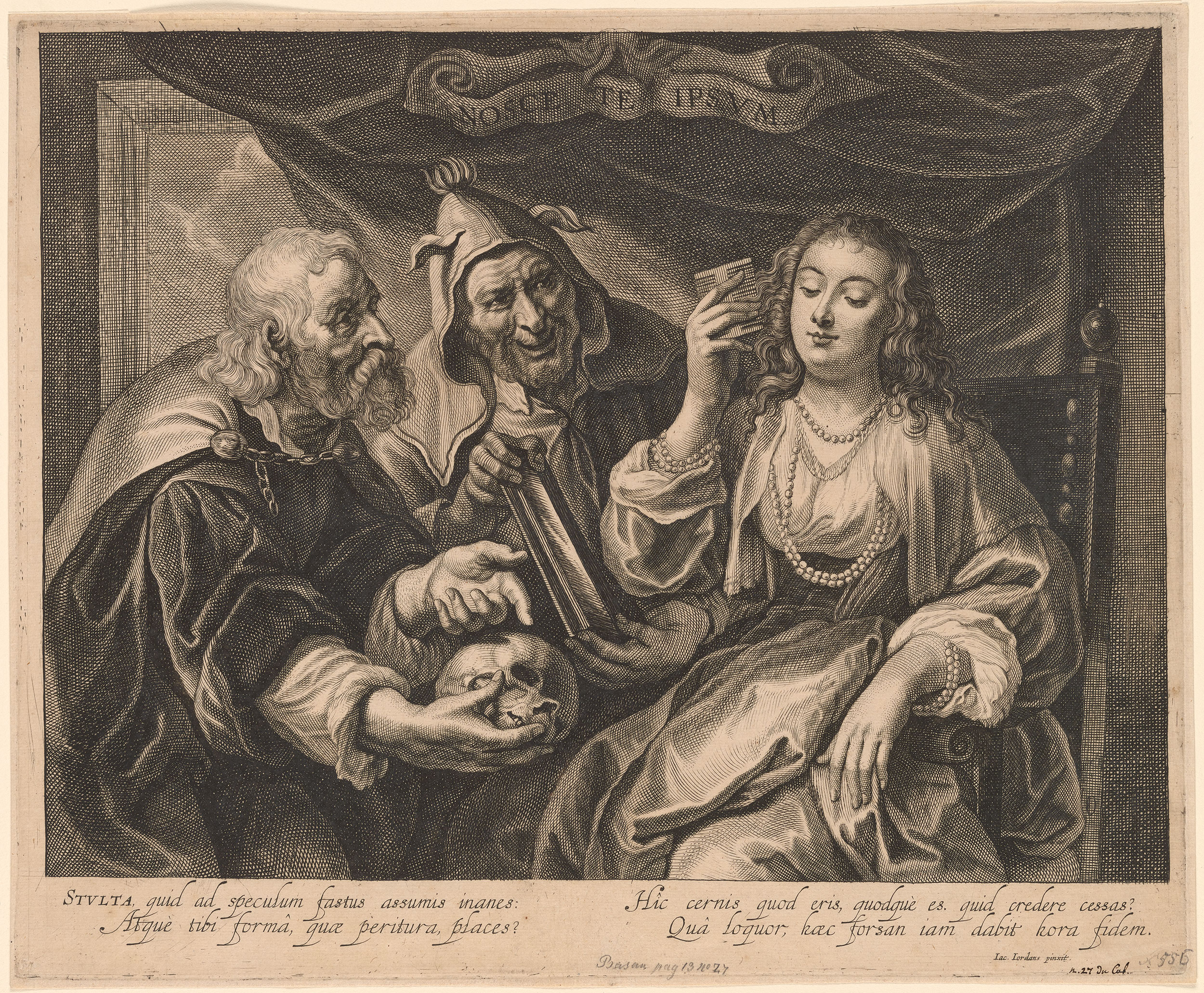
Nosce Te Ipsum (Allegory of Vanity), engraving by Jacob Neefs after a drawing by Jacob Jordaens

Jacob Neefs or Jacob Neeffs (1610 in Antwerp – after 1660 in Antwerp) was a Flemish etcher, engraver and publisher. He worked on publication projects for prominent Flemish artists of his time including Rubens, van Dyck and Jacob Jordaens.

== Life ==
Jacob Neefs was a pupil of Lucas Vorsterman the Elder. In 1632-3 he was admitted as a master in the Guild of Saint Luke of Antwerp. In March 1632 he became a member of the 'Sodaliteit van de Bejaerde Jongmans', a fraternity for bachelors established by the Jesuit order. He married Anne Antonissen on 5 February 1655. He is last mentioned in the registers of the Guild of Saint Luke in 1661.

His pupils included Jacques vande Velde (1644–45) and Emanuel Winghen.

== Work ==
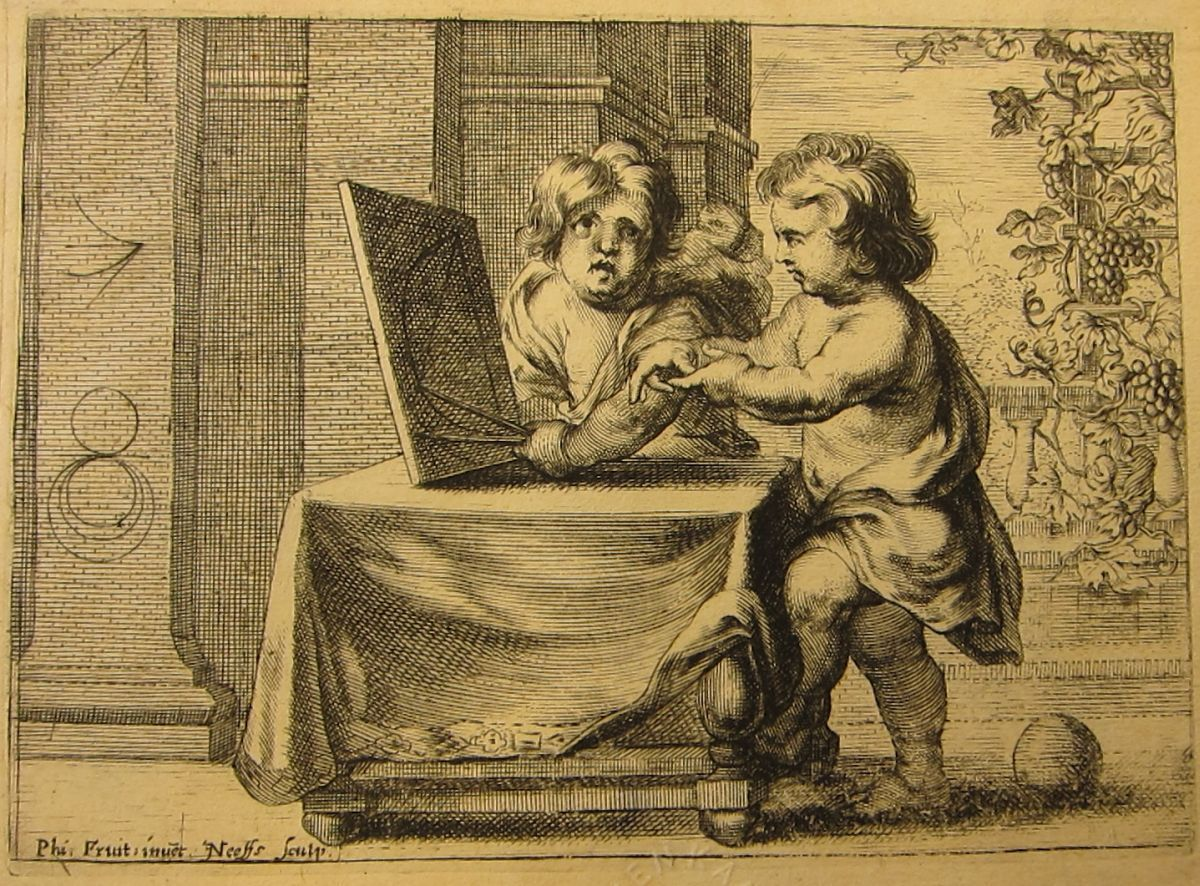
Two putti calculate the distance between two points with a compass, engraving by Jacob Neefs after a drawing by Philip Fruytiers

Neefs worked as an engraver for the leading Flemish painters of his age. In Rubens' studio he belonged to the 'new generation' of engravers with the likes of Hans Witdoeck. He was one of the last to work under Rubens himself.

He worked on the Iconography of Anthony van Dyck and completed some of the portraits for the later editions of the Iconography by adding a sculptural bust and pedestal. It is unknown whether or not this was van Dyck's intention.

Other prominent painters for whom or after whom he made engravings include Jacob Jordaens, Abraham van Diepenbeeck, Gerard Seghers, Philip Fruytiers, Annibale Carracci and Theodoor van Thulden.

He collaborated on various printing projects with the leading engravers of his time including Mattheus Borrekens, Cornelis Galle the Younger, Wenceslaus Hollar, Pieter de Jode II, Theodoor van Merlen, Michel Natalis and Paulus Pontius. Between 1635 and 1659 Jacob Neeffs illustrated about 10 books, mainly published in Antwerp and Leuven.

His works are mainly executed with the burin. He also gained a reputation for his drawings which demonstrate a steadiness of hand.

== Bibliography ==
- BASAN F. e.a, Dictionnaire des graveurs anciens et modernes depuis l'origine de la gravure. Avec une notice des principales estampes qu'ils ont gravées; suivi des catalogues des oeuvres de Jacques Jordans & de Corneille Visscher, vol. 2, De Lormel, Parijs, 1767, p. 60
- DELEN A., Tentoonstelling van teekeningen en prenten van Antwerpsche meesters der XVIIe eeuw (Rubens en zijn tijd) [tentoonstellingscatalogus], Antwerpen augustus 1927 – September 1927, Stad Antwerpen, 1927
- HOLLSTEIN F.W.H., Dutch and Flemish Etchings, Engravings and Woodcuts, c. 1450–1700, Amsterdam, 1949
- VAN DEN WIJNGAERT F., Inventaris der Rubeniaansche prentkunst, Uitgeverij de sikkel, Antwerpen, 1940, p. 17
