= Lucas Vorsterman the Elder =

Baroque engraver (1595–1675)

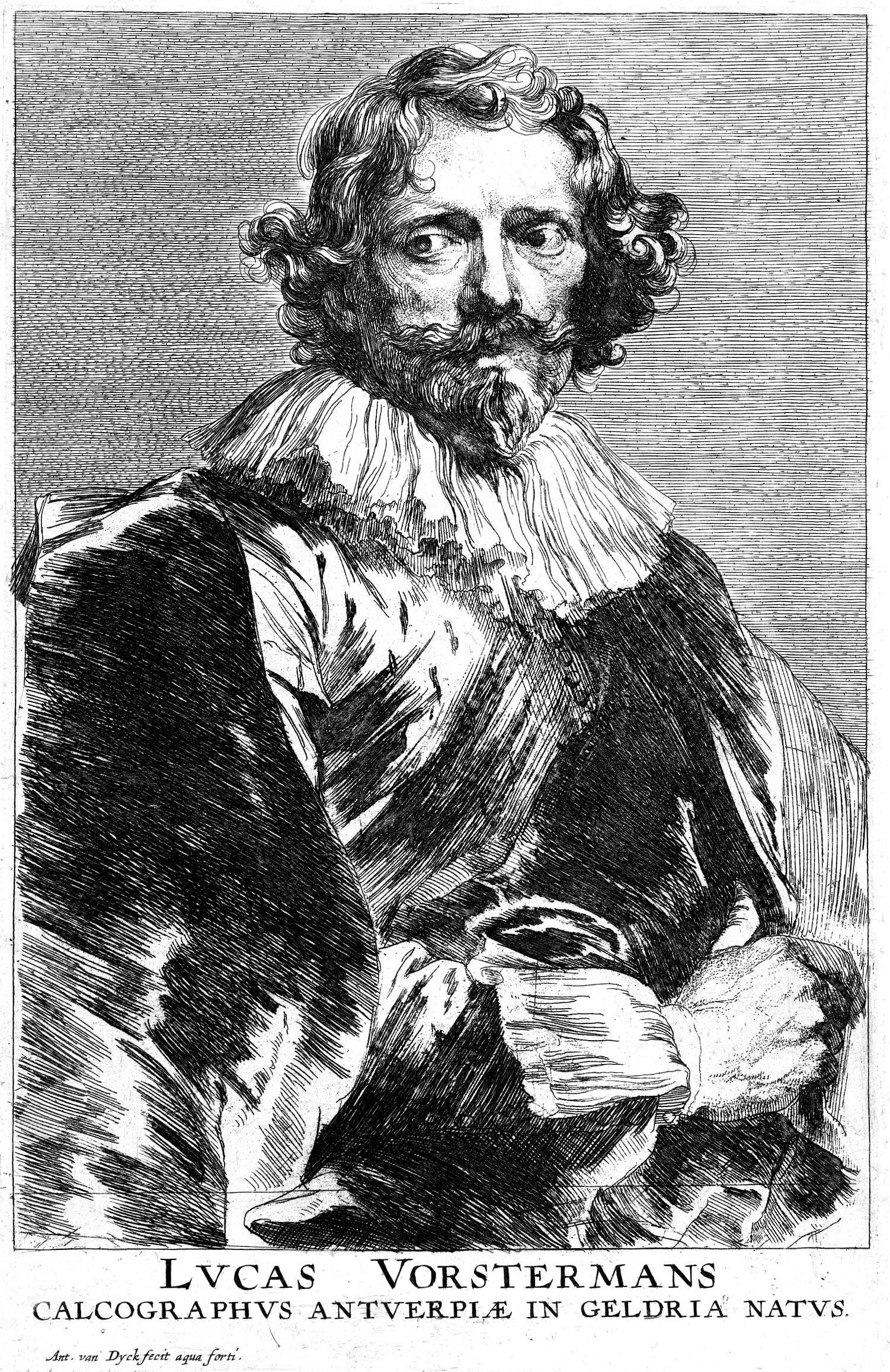
Portrait of Lucas Vorsterman, engraving by Anthony van Dyck for his Iconography

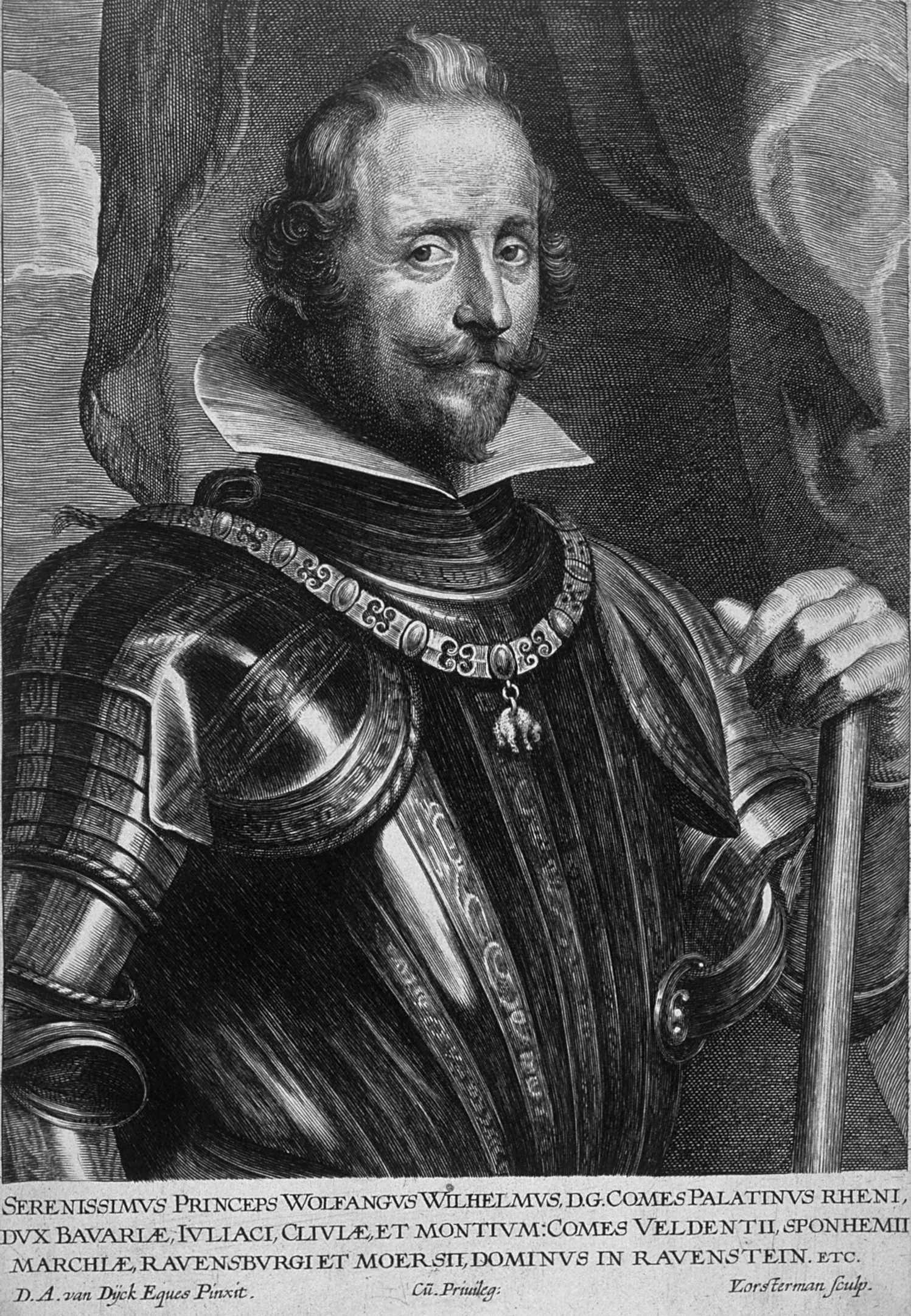
Wolfgang William, Count Palatine of Neuburg; engraving by Lucas Vorsterman the Elder after a portrait by Anthony van Dyck

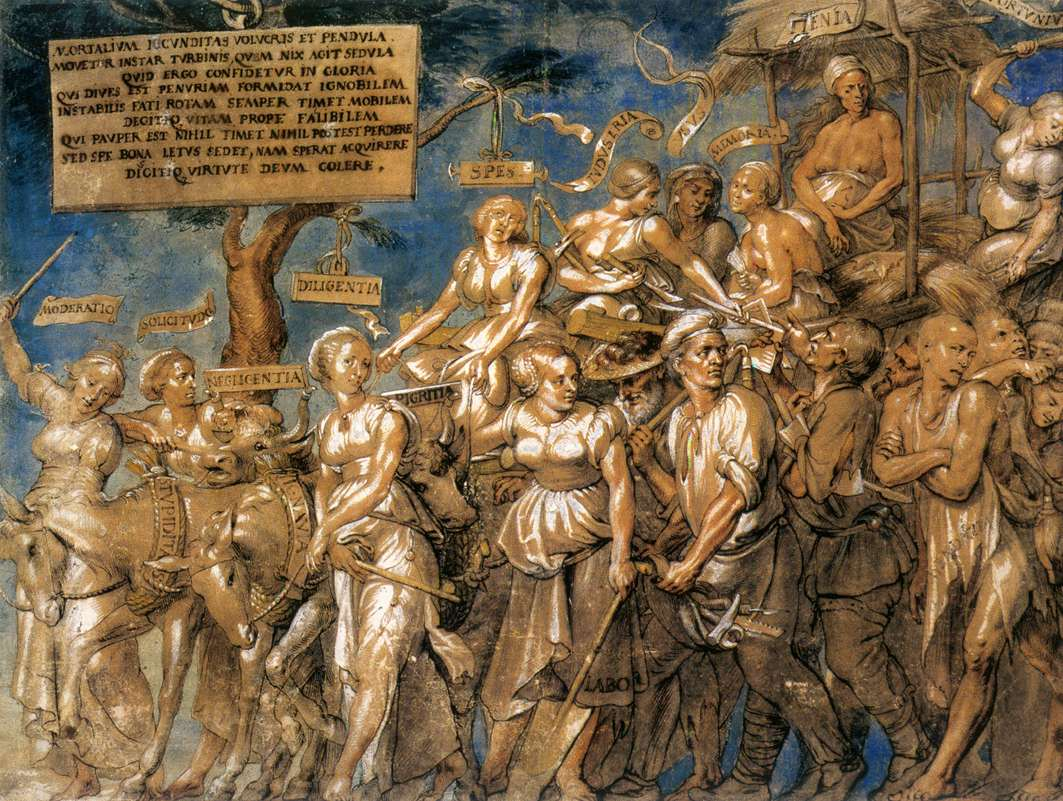
Triumph of Poverty

Lucas Vorsterman (1595–1675) was a Baroque engraver. He worked with the artists Peter Paul Rubens and Anthony van Dyck, as well as for patrons such as Thomas Howard, 21st Earl of Arundel and Charles I of England.

== Biography ==
Vorsterman was born in Zaltbommel. Around 1618, Vorsterman joined Rubens' workshop. Between 1619 and 1621, Vorsterman was Rubens's sole engraver. At that time, Rubens had embarked upon a printmaking enterprise in which he enlisted Vorsterman to engrave a number of his notable paintings, to which Rubens appended personal and professional dedications to noteworthy individuals.

In 1621, a violent dispute arose between Vorsterman and Rubens. It is not clear whether there was a physical altercation between the two men, but the situation was sufficiently serious for Rubens' lawyers to petition the authorities for a protection order, which was granted. The exact causes of the dispute are not known, but it has generally been assumed that its source was in the issue of ownership of the authorial rights to the prints engraved by Vorsterman on the basis of Rubens' designs. In 1621, Vorsterman began to add his own dedications to his engravings after Rubens' paintings. Before the dispute arose, their relationship had ostensibly been good since Rubens had agreed to be godfather to Vorsterman's eldest son Lucas Vorsterman II. The dispute ended the working relationship between the two men.

In 1624, Vorsterman went to England and survived on the patronage of royalty and nobility. He returned to Antwerp in 1630 and was one of the printmakers selected by Van Dyck to engrave plates for his Iconography. Vorsterman executed twenty-two of the original eighty plates. Vorsterman lost his sight in his old age and he lived in poverty. He lived on the support of the Antwerp Guild of St Luke until his death in 1675.

His pupils include Paulus Pontius, Hans Witdoeck, Jacob Neefs and Marinus Robyn van der Goes. Vosterman's son Lucas Vorsterman II (born in 1624) was trained by his father as an engraver.
