= Ildefonso Altarpiece =

Painting by Peter Paul Rubens

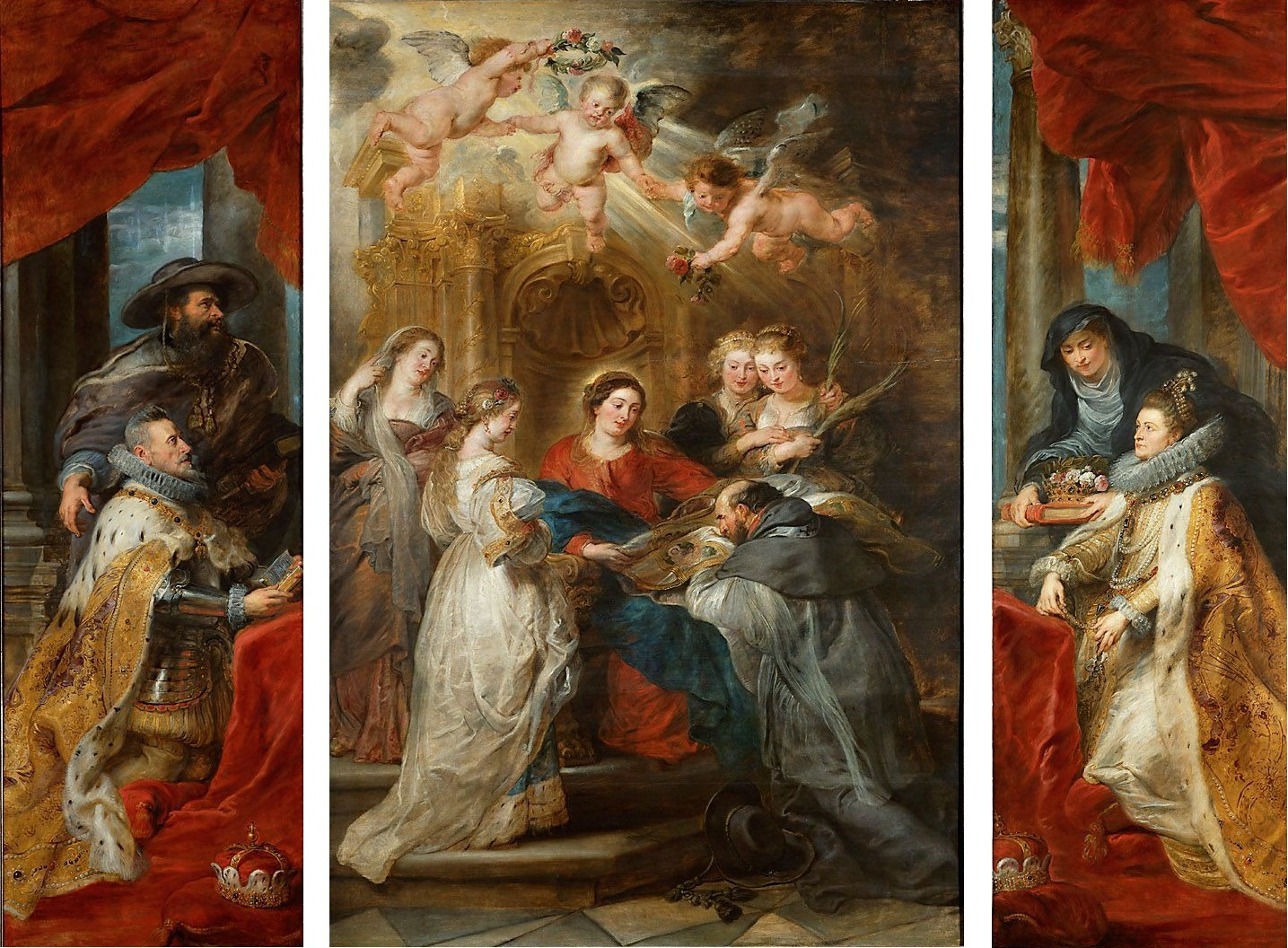
Ildefonso Altarpiece (1630-1631) by Rubens

The Ildefonso Altarpiece is a triptych painting by Peter Paul Rubens, dating to between 1630 and 1631. It is now in the Kunsthistorisches Museum, in Vienna.

It is named after the central panel, which shows Saint Ildefonsus's vision of the Virgin Mary, in which she gave him a casula. On the side panels are Isabella Clara Eugenia and Albert VII, regents of the Spanish Netherlands, with their patron saints Albert (Note: There are many saints called Albert. The figure in the painting is wearing the habit of a member of the Dominican Order. That seems to reduce the number of possibilities to one: Saint Albert the Great. Albert VII was born on 13 November 1559. It was customary in the Roman Catholic church at that time to christen children on the second or third day after birth. If Albert VII was christened on 15 November 1559, he will have been named after, and his patron saint will have been, that Saint Albert, whose feast day it was.) and Elisabeth of Hungary. Albert had founded the Ildefonso Brotherhood in the Church of St. James on Coudenberg in Brussels, to encourage loyalty to the Habsburg dynasty - the altarpiece was commissioned for the Brotherhood by his widow shortly after his death.
