= Hans Witdoeck =

Flemish engraver

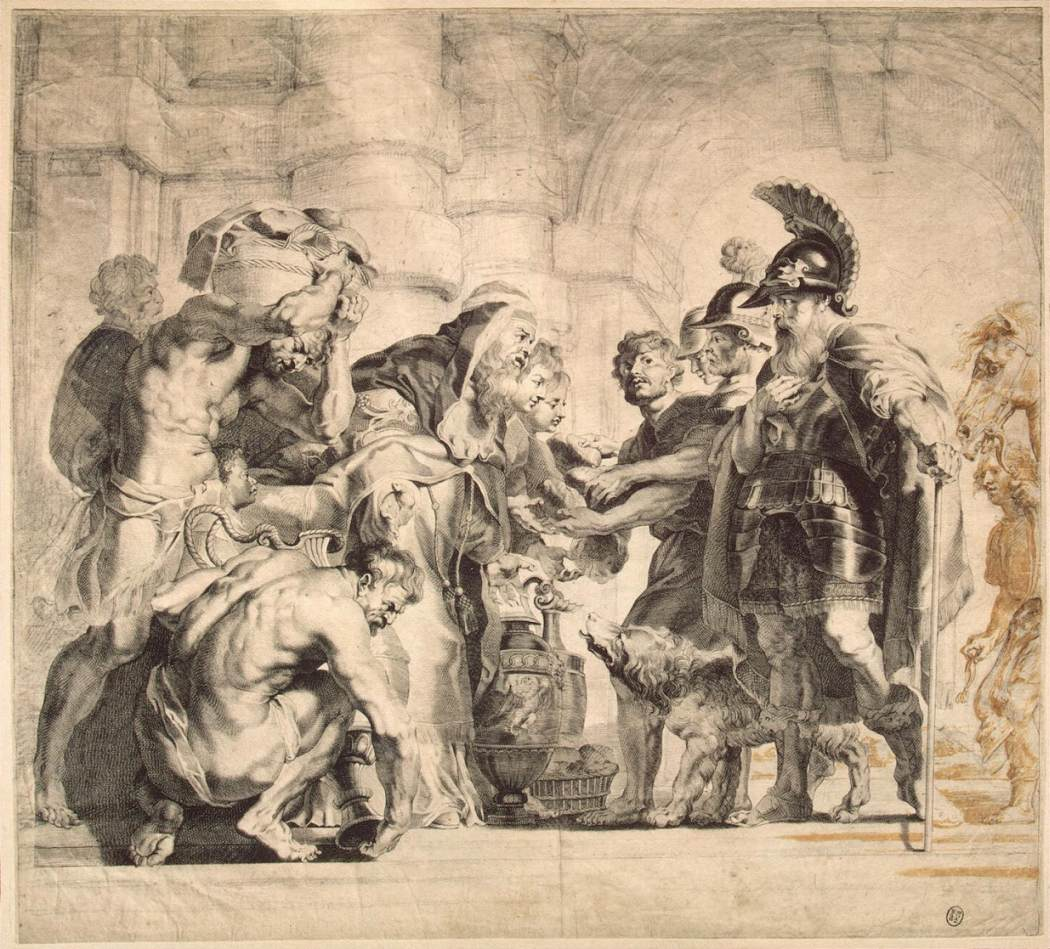
Abraham and Melchizedech

Hans Witdoeck or Jan Witdoeck (Antwerp, baptized 8 December 1615 - probably Antwerp, after 1642) was a Flemish engraver, draughtsman and art dealer. He belonged to the last generation of reproductive engravers who worked for Rubens' workshop from the mid-1630s.

== Life ==
Hans Witdoeck was a pupil of the engraver Lucas Vorsterman in the years 1630–1631. Vorsterman had joined Rubens' workshop around 1617 or 1618 and had established himself as Rubens' primary engraver since. Hans Witdoeck broke the three-year training contract with Vorsterman after only two years at the instigation of his father. He then trained for two years with the painter Cornelis Schut who introduced him to painting. He subsequently trained with Rubens where he learned the engraving of large plates. After the death of Rubens in 1640, Witdoeck worked mainly as an art dealer.

He married Catherina Gommaerts on 24 June 1642. Since there are no further records on Witdoeck following his marriage, it is presumed that he died shortly afterwards.

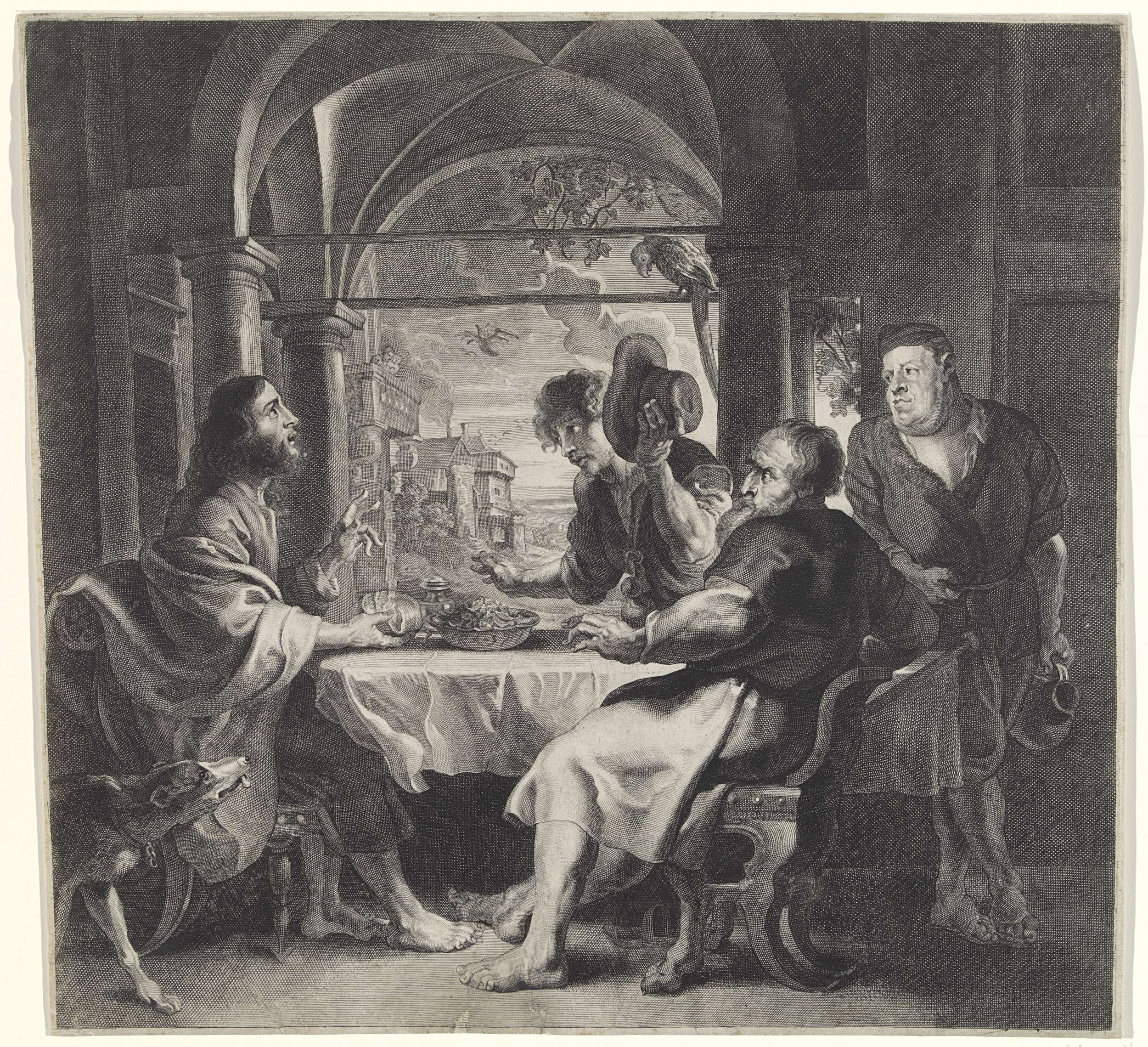
Supper at Emmaus

== Work ==
In his early engravings he made for Cornelis Schut, Witdoeck followed a traditional style similar to that of Cornelis Galle and his workshop. This early style was characterized by dry lines using many curves and an emphasis on plasticity. Witdoeck made two engravings after paintings of Cornelis Schut and nine Madonna images, usually of a small size.

His style became more fluid while he worked at Rubens' workshop where he produced his best work. At Rubens' workshop Witdoeck learned to engrave large plates. Witdoeck worked between 1634 and 1638 under the close supervision of Rubens on many engravings, including Abraham and Melchizedek, the Adoration of the Magi, the three-part Raising of the Cross, the Supper at Emmaus, Saint Ildefonso receiving the chasuble, Cicero and Demosthenes. Rubens specified the year 1638 for all these prints likely so that he only needed to apply for one printing privilege for the lot. The following year an Assumption of Mary and the Miracle of St. Just by Witdoeck were published. Witdoeck also produced a few undated prints while at Rubens' workshop.

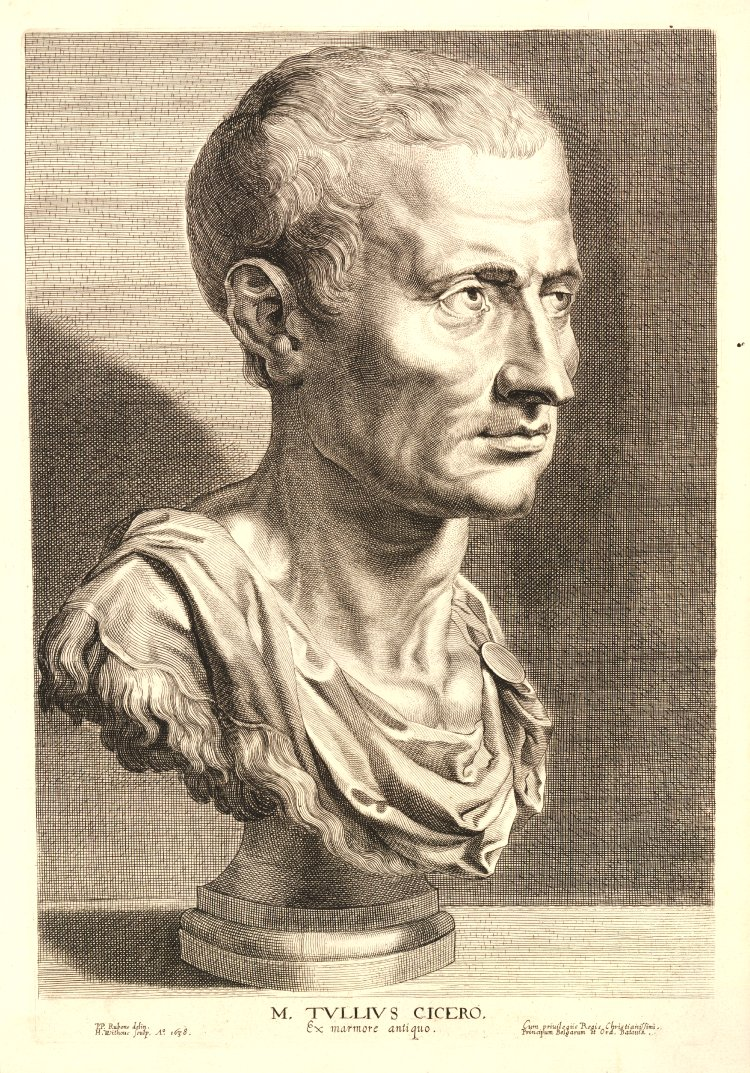
M. Tullius Cicero

It is clear from the revision and production process of these prints that Rubens was closely involved in their design and execution. This is documented by the process of the creation of a series of twelve plates after antique marble portrait sculptures (heads, busts, herms) by the four printmakers Hans Witdoeck, Paulus Pontius, Lucas Vorsterman, and Boetius à Bolswert working for Rubens. The production of the prints was closely supervised by Rubens as is demonstrated by five retouched proof impressions. Only six of Rubens' preparatory drawings for the series have survived. Witdoeck showed in his prints after Rubens a great skill in capturing the movement and variety of colour in the original works through his clever use of black, grey and white tones. A typical example is Abraham and Melchizedek.
