= Philip Fruytiers =

Flemish Baroque painter and engraver (1610–1666)

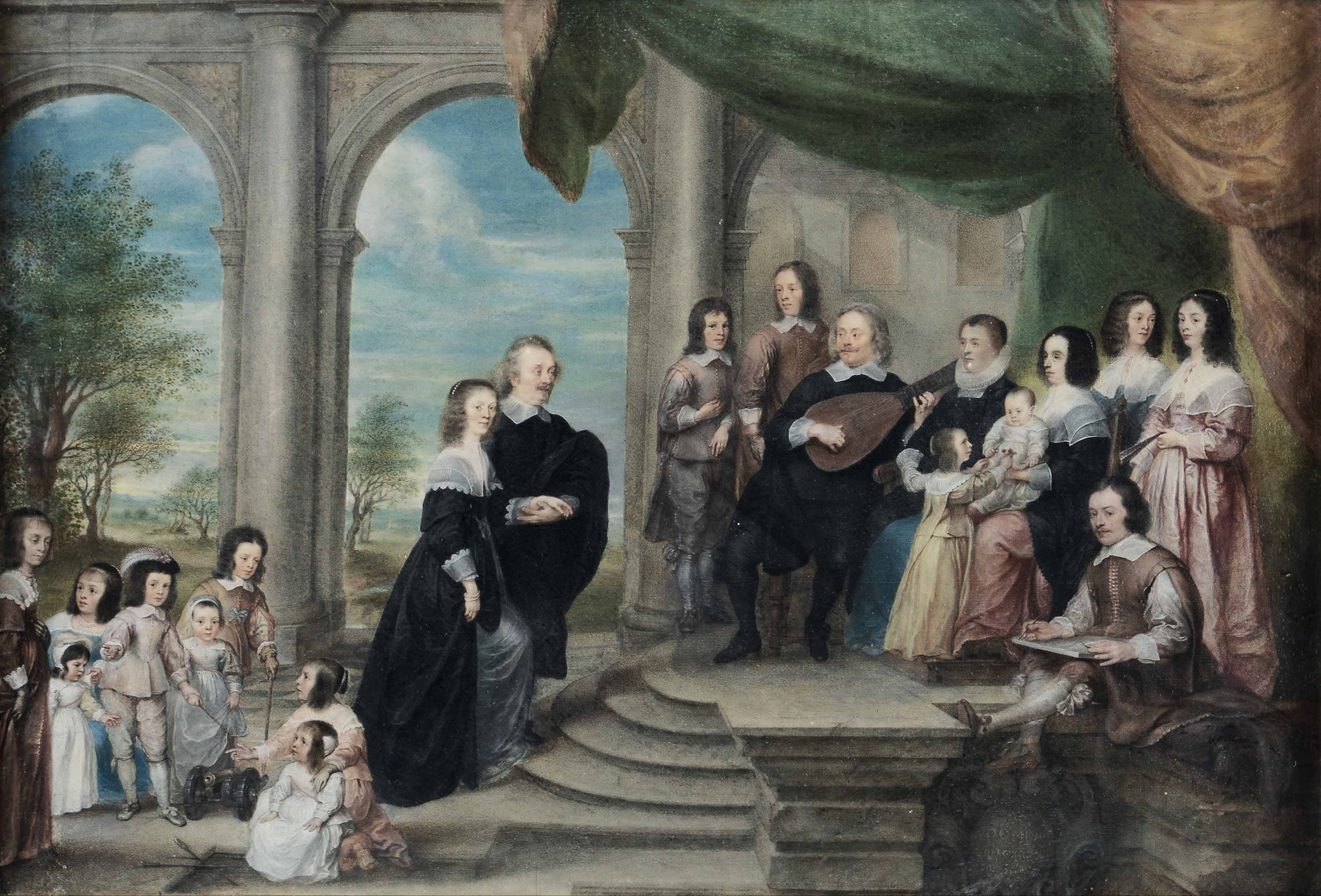
Family on a Terrace, possibly including a self-portrait

Philip Fruytiers (1610–1666) was a Flemish Baroque painter and engraver. Until the 1960s, he was especially known for his miniature portraits in watercolor and gouache. Since then, several large canvases signed with the monogram PHF have been ascribed to him. These new findings have led to a renewed appreciation for his contribution to the Antwerp Baroque.

== Life ==
Details about his life are scarce. He was born in Antwerp on 10 January 1610 as the son of Jan Fruytiers and Catherina Vervloet. He is listed as a pupil at the Jesuit college in Antwerp in 1627. He contributed texts in Latin, French and Dutch to an emblem book published in 1627 by that college at the Joannes Cnobbaert imprint in Antwerp under the title Typus mundi in quo ejus calamitates et pericula nec non divini, humanique amoris antipathia, emblematice proponuntur. The illustrations of this publication were made by Philips van Mallery.

No information about his artistic training is available. He became a master of the Antwerp Guild of Saint Luke in the guild year 1631–32. He is described in the register of the Guild as an illuminator, painter and engraver.

Between September 1630 and 18 October 1665 he was very active in the 'Sodaliteit van de Bejaerde Jongmans', a fraternity for bachelors established by the Jesuit order.

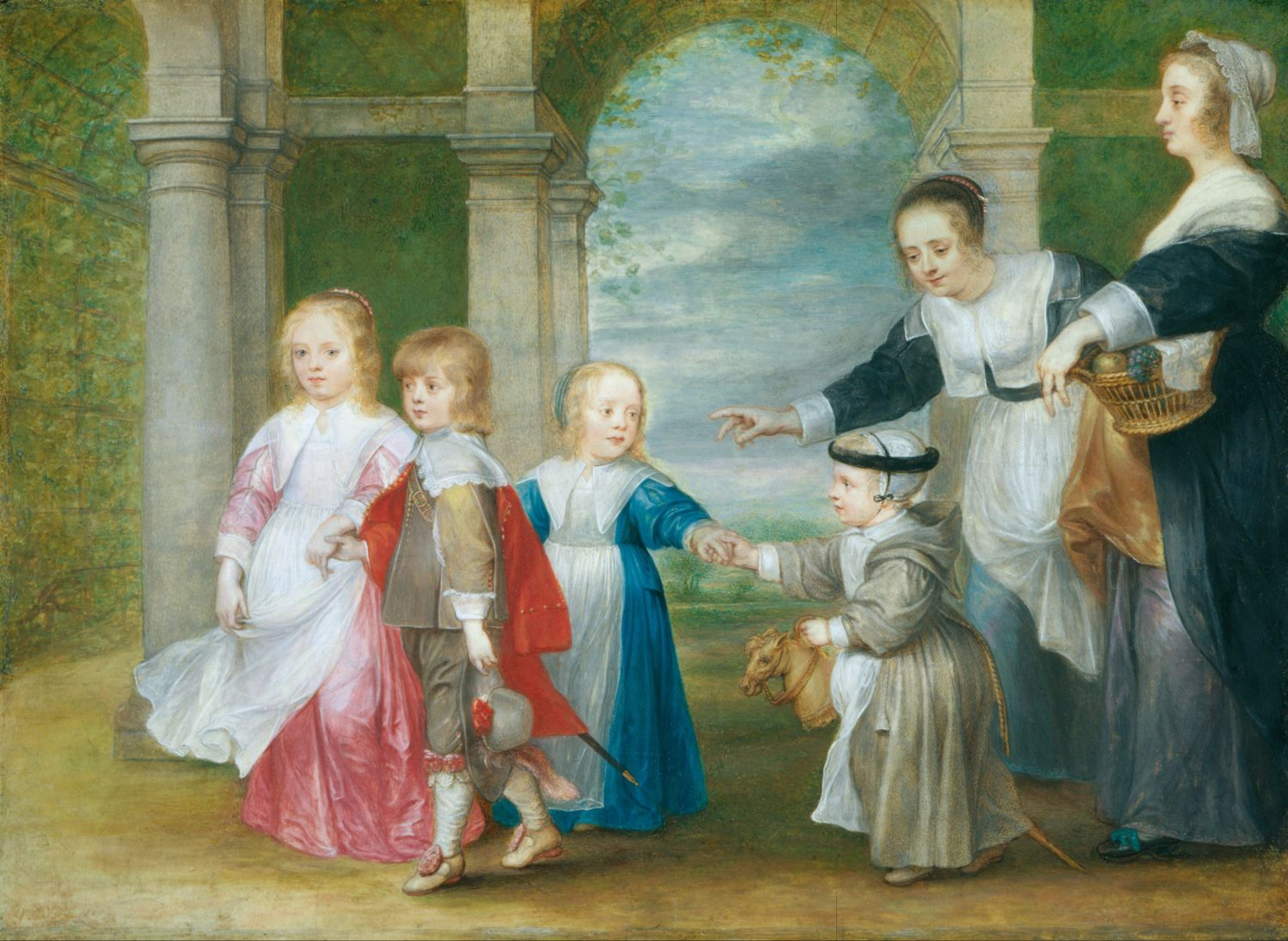
The four children of Rubens and Helena Fourment with maids

He was the teacher of Ambrosius Gast (II), Gualterus Gysaerts, Franciscus Fruytiers, Adrian Cockx (1649–50), Wauter Gyssels (1662–63) and Gregoris de Vos (1663–64).

He died in Antwerp on 19 June 1666 and was buried on 21 June.

== Work ==
Philip Fruytiers was until the middle of the 20th century mainly known as a miniature painter and portraitist who worked in watercolor and gouache. A portrait of a Family on a Terrace signed and dated 1638 (Cambi auction in Genoa of 30 June 2020 lot 114) shows a family in an outdoor setting with an artist drawing in a sketchbook. This may be a self-portrait of Fruytiers. His most famous miniature depicts Rubens' four children, his second wife Helena Fourment and two servants date 1638 (Royal Collection, Windsor Castle). This miniature is probably the portrait listed in the inventory of the estate of Rubens in 1641 and on which at that time the price of the frame and glass was still outstanding. Fruytiers also painted large portraits like that of David Teniers the Younger and group or family portraits such as that of the three children of Rubens.

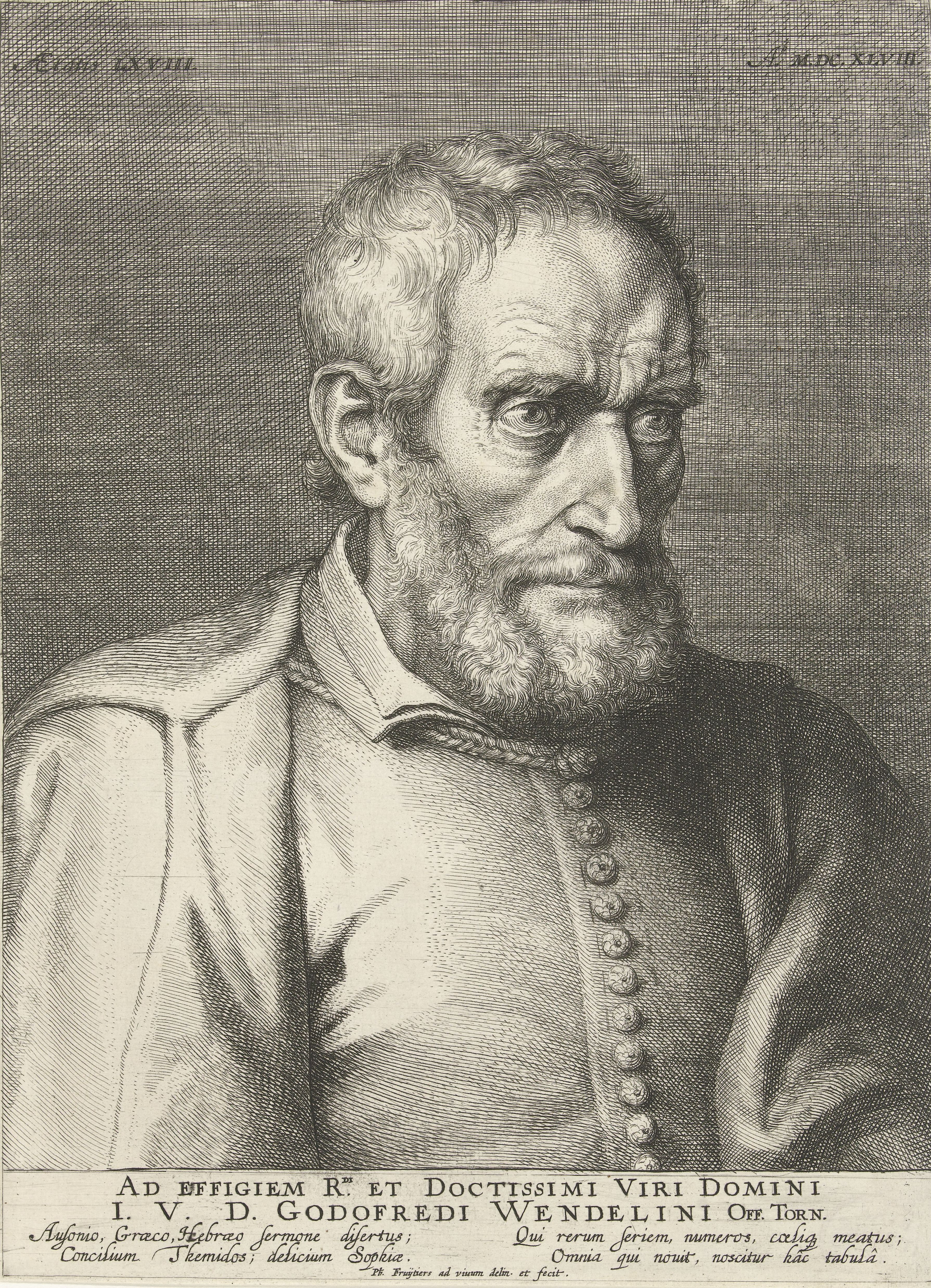
Portrait of Govaert Wendelen, etching

The accepted view of Philip Fruytiers as principally a miniaturist and watercolorist was based partially on the descriptions in the early biographical works by Cornelis de Bie and Arnold Houbraken.

Although Cornelis de Bie mentioned that Fruytiers also painted altarpieces, the only known works by his hand until the 1960s were works on paper or vellum. As a result, the established view about the nature of his work was not challenged. In the 1960s this view had to be revised, however, when three large paintings of saints dated 1652 with the monogram "PHF" (in the Royal Museum of Fine Arts Antwerp), which were previously attributed to a hypothetical painter PH Franck, were identified as being by the hand of Fruytiers. The same signature was subsequently discovered on another altarpiece in the parish church in Zundert, North Brabant, which had been purchased from the inventory of the dissolved Antwerp St Michael's Abbey in 1802. This led to the attribution to Fruytiers of other paintings in collections of the Royal Museums of Fine Arts of Belgium in Brussels, the Royal Museum of Fine Arts Antwerp and the Museo del Prado in Madrid, and in the parish church of Gistel, West Flanders. Drawings for some of his altarpieces are kept in the Plantin-Moretus Museum in Antwerp, the Yale University Art Gallery and the Kupferstichkabinett Berlin.

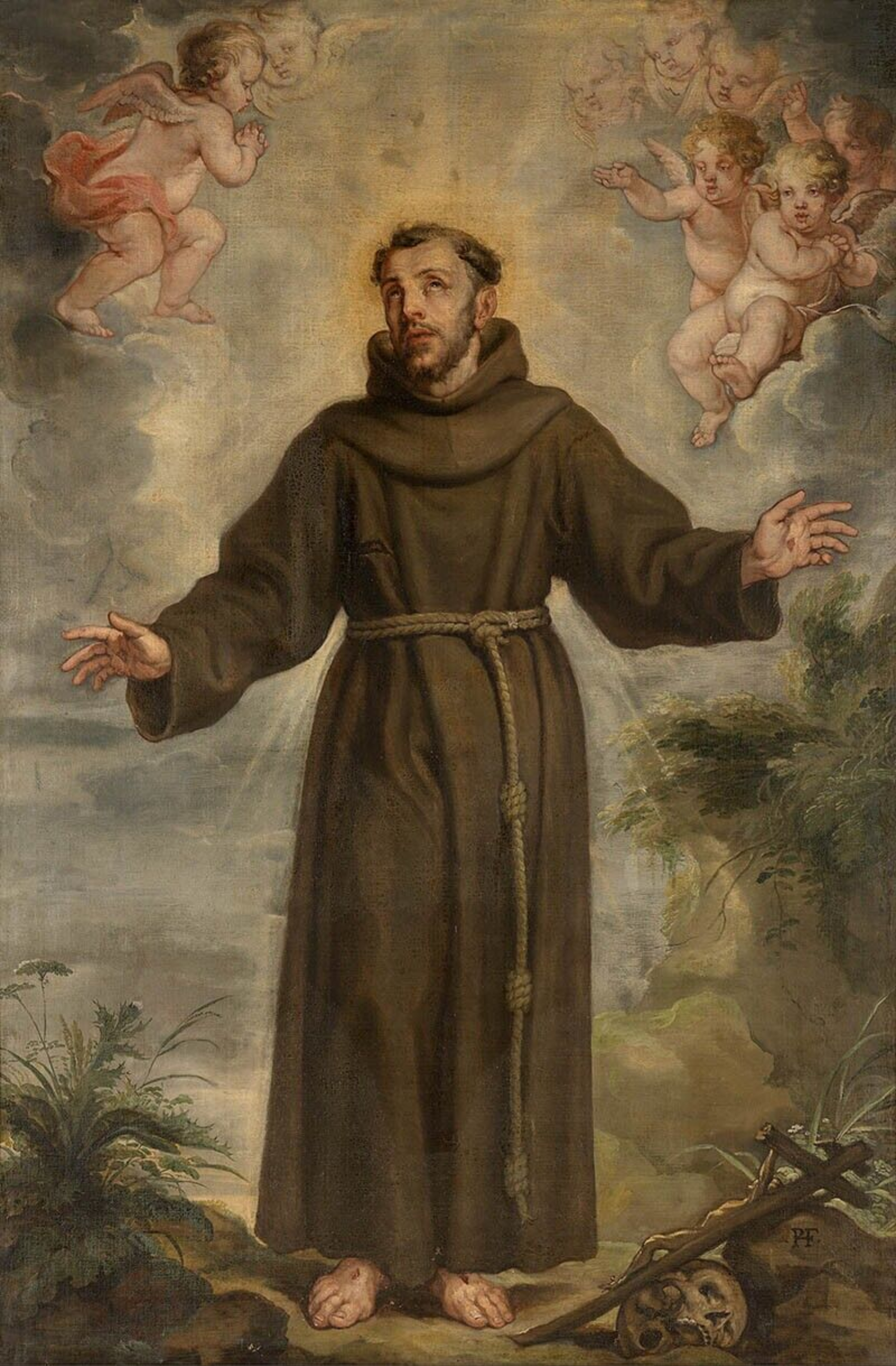
St. Francis of Assisi

Fruytiers' style is generally much closer to the refinement and delicacy of Anthony van Dyck than to the more monumental art of Rubens.

An expressive portrait drawing of the Jesuit Jan de Tollenaere (Johannes Tollenarius) (Morgan Library & Museum) was a study for an engraving made by Jacob Neefs.

Fruytiers was an accomplished engraver and produced several portrait etchings such as those of the Capuchin Innocentius de Caltagirone and the Flemish mathematician and astronomer Govaert Wendelen. He made designs for the frontispiece and illustrations for devotional books and other religious prints by Antwerp engravers such as Cornelis Galle the Younger and Conraad Lauwers. One of his outstanding designs of a frontispiece is that for the Imago primi saeculi Societatis Iesu a Provincia Flandro-Belgica eiusdem Societatis repraesentata, a book written by Jean Bolland and Godfrey Henschen was printed by Balthasar I Moretus at the Plantin Moretus press in Antwerp in 1640. The design which was engraved by Cornelis Galle the Elder.
