= Saint Margaret and the Dragon (Raphael) =

Painting by Raphael

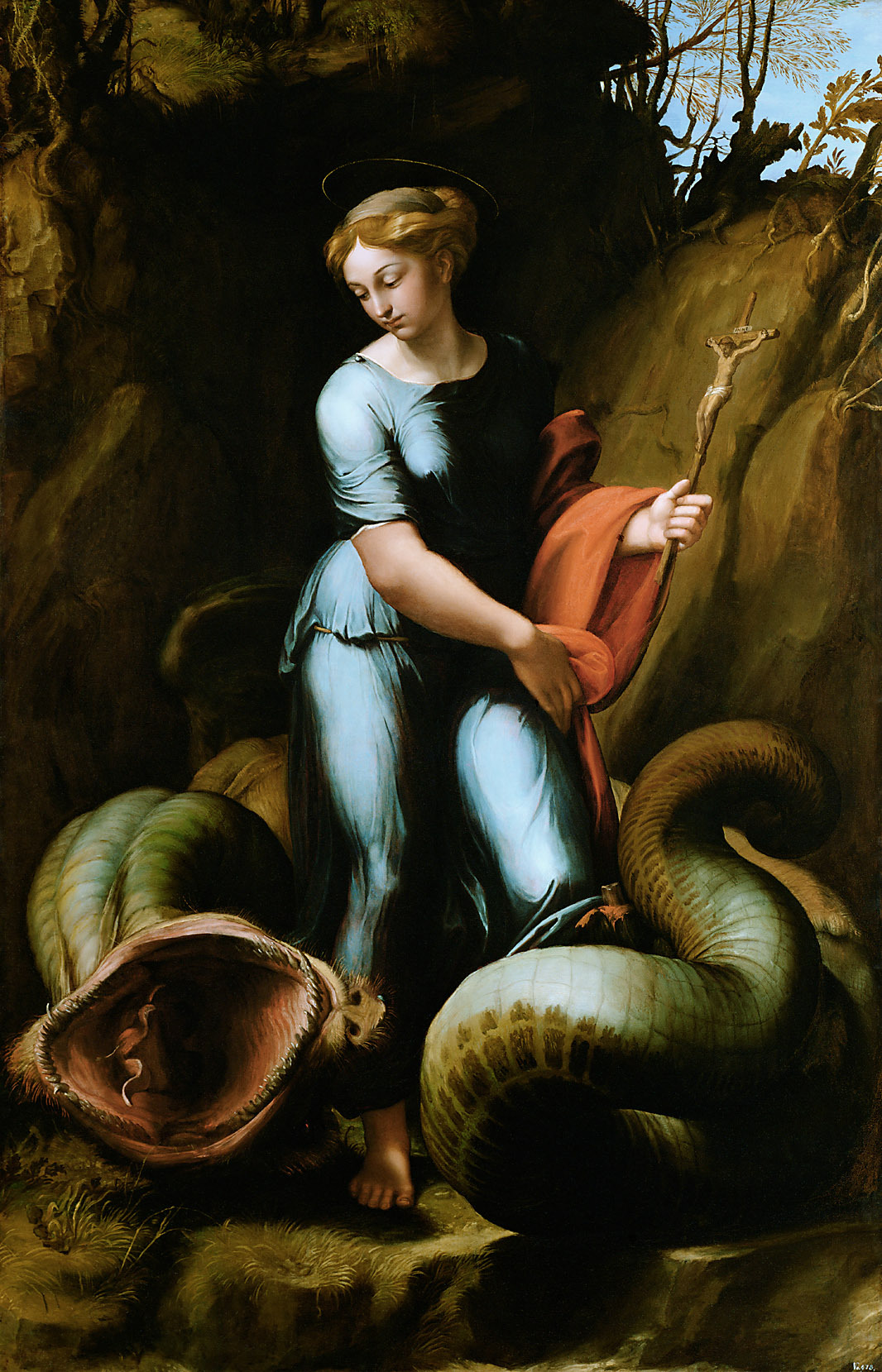
Vienna version, 192 x 122 cm

Paris version, 178 x 122 cm

Saint Margaret and the Dragon is the title shared by two paintings of Saint Margaret by the Renaissance painter Raphael, both executed in about 1518. One is held in the Kunsthistorisches Museum in Vienna, the other in the Louvre in Paris.

== Vienna version ==
The painting shows the saint at the moment before she is swallowed alive by the dragon. She is shown unafraid, holding the crucifix that will save her once she is swallowed.

=== Theatrum Pictorium ===
This painting was documented in David Teniers the Younger's catalog Theatrum Pictorium of the art collection of Archduke Leopold Wilhelm in 1659 and again in 1673, but the portrait had already enjoyed notoriety in Teniers' portrayals of the Archduke's art collection.

== Paris version ==
Another version showing the central figure holding a palm branch is in the collection of the Louvre.

== Gallery ==
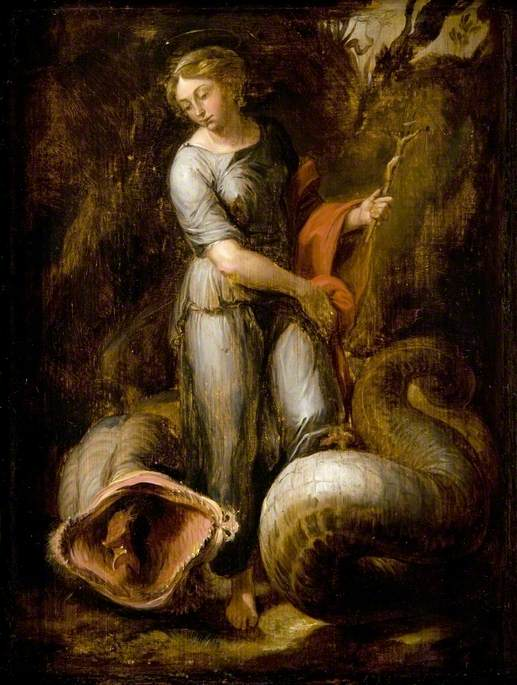
Copy by Teniers after the Vienna version in the Kelvingrove Art Gallery, Glasgow

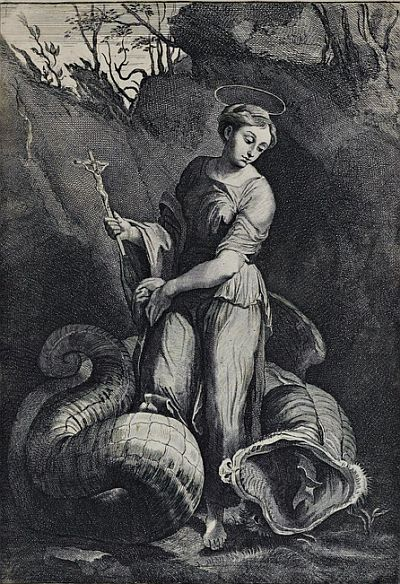
Engraving from Teniers' catalog by Jan van Troyen, 1673

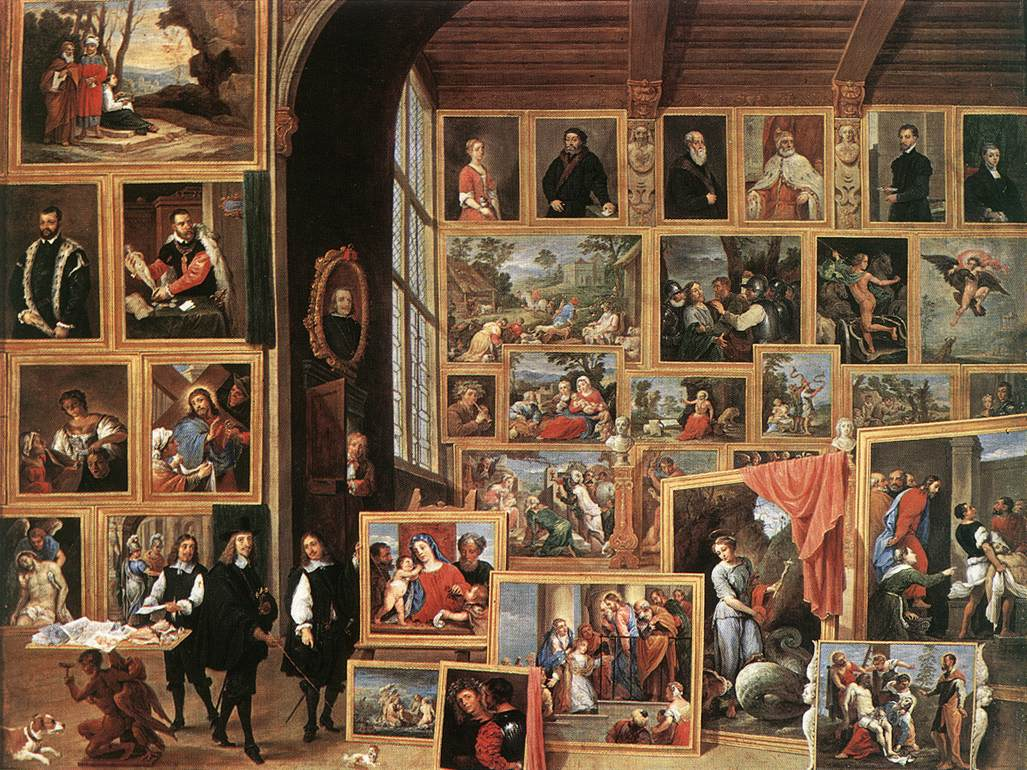
Gallery of Archduke Leopold Wilhelm in Brussels (Schleissheim), 1640

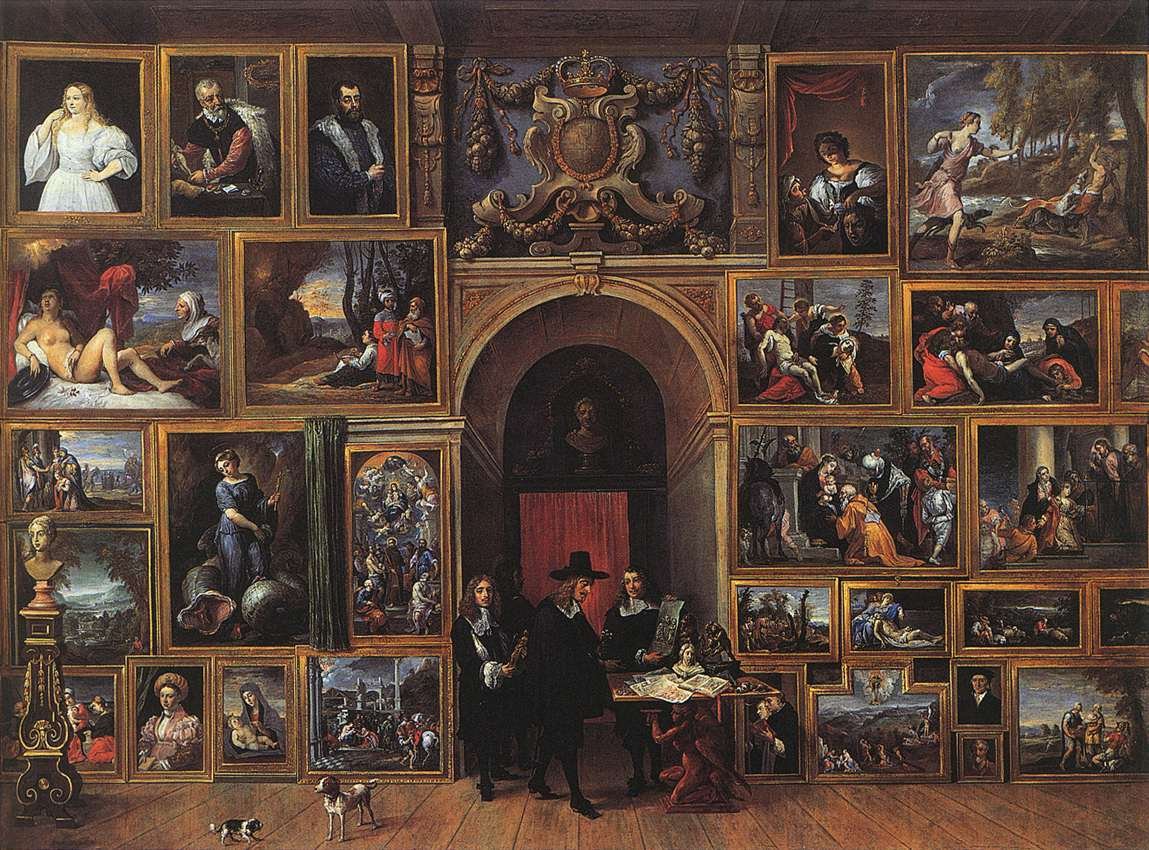
Gallery of Archduke Leopold Wilhelm (Brussels), 1651

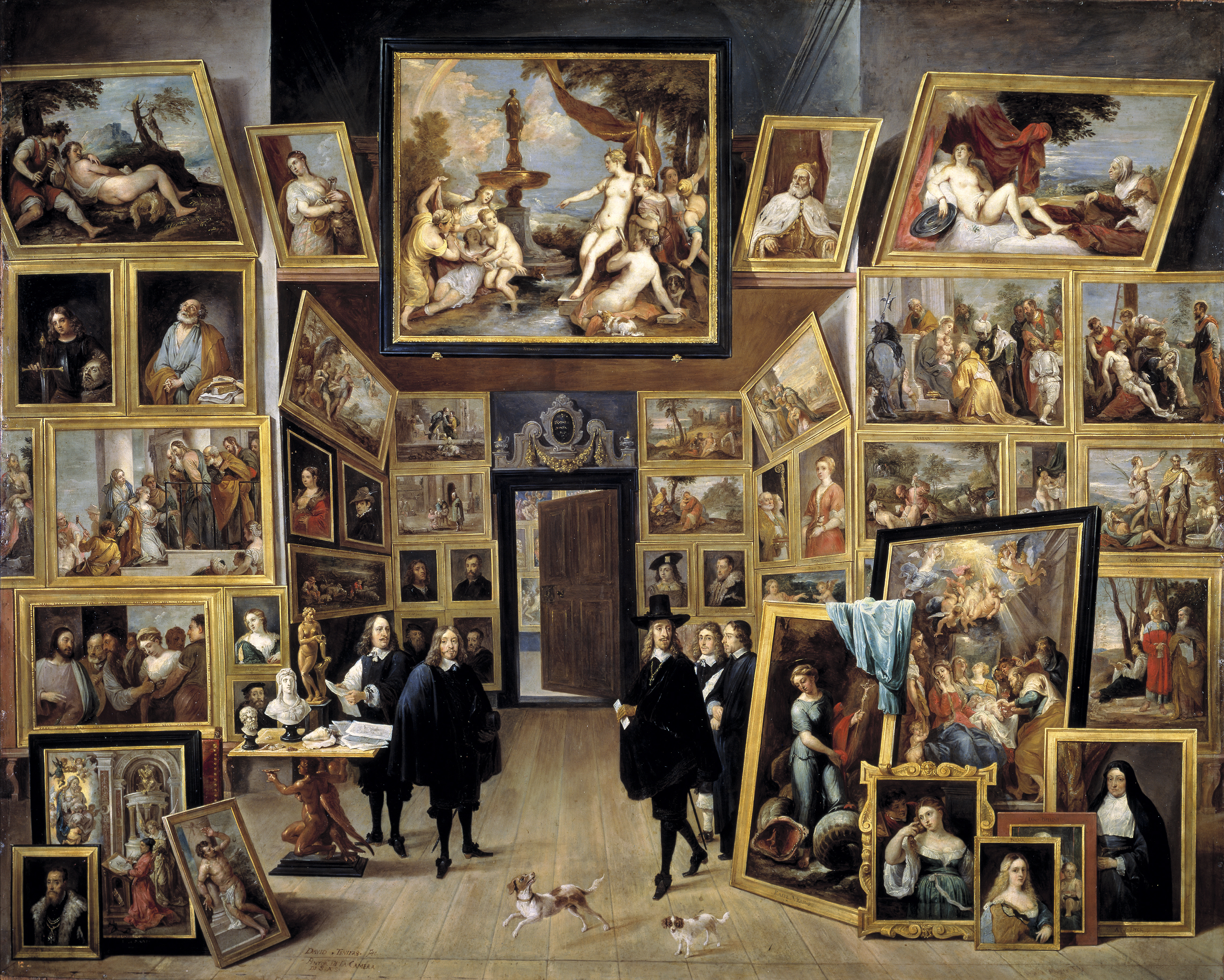
The Archduke Leopold Wilhelm in his Painting Gallery in Brussels, 1651

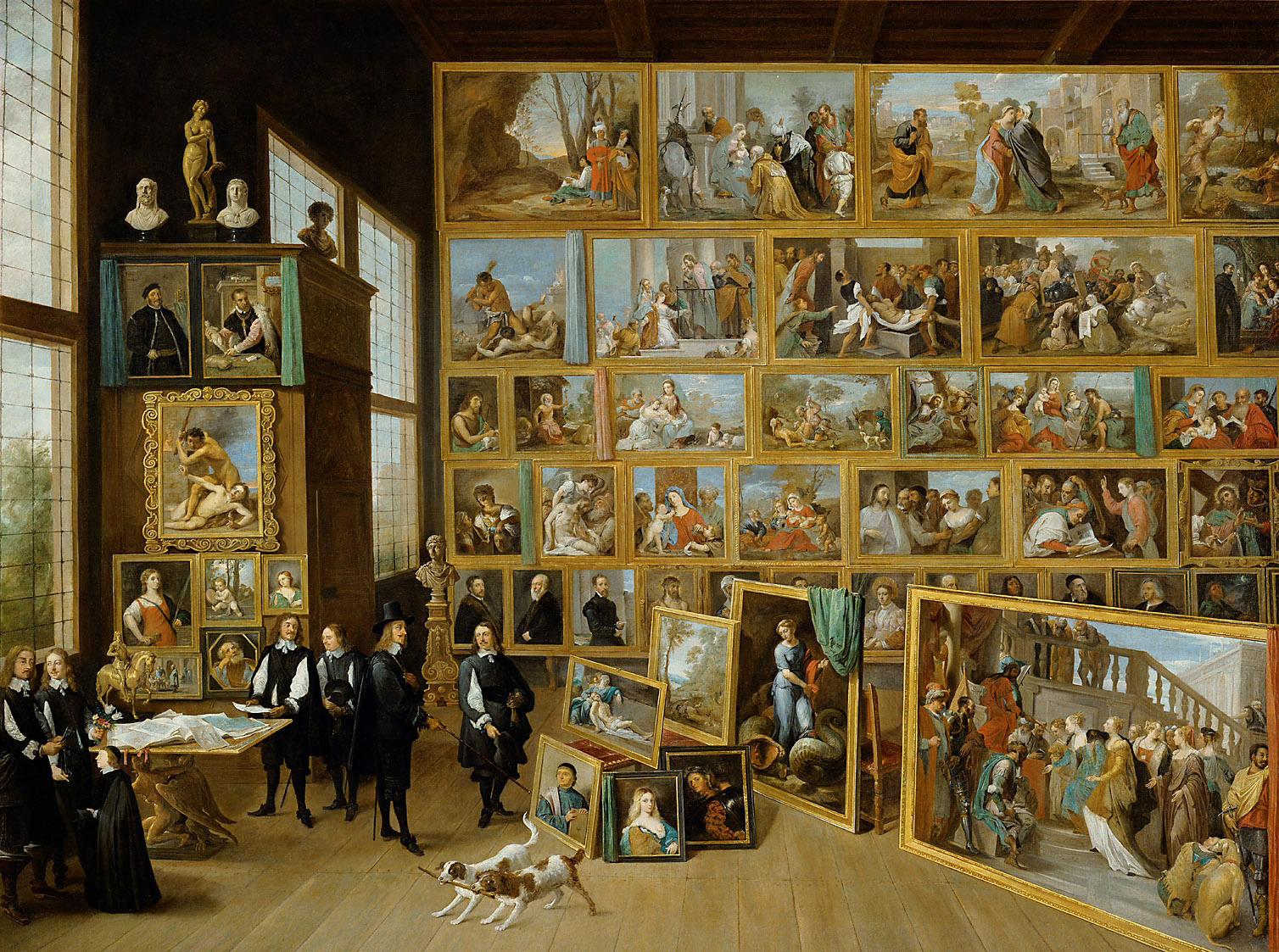
Gallery of Archduke Leopold Wilhelm in Brussels (Vienna), 1651

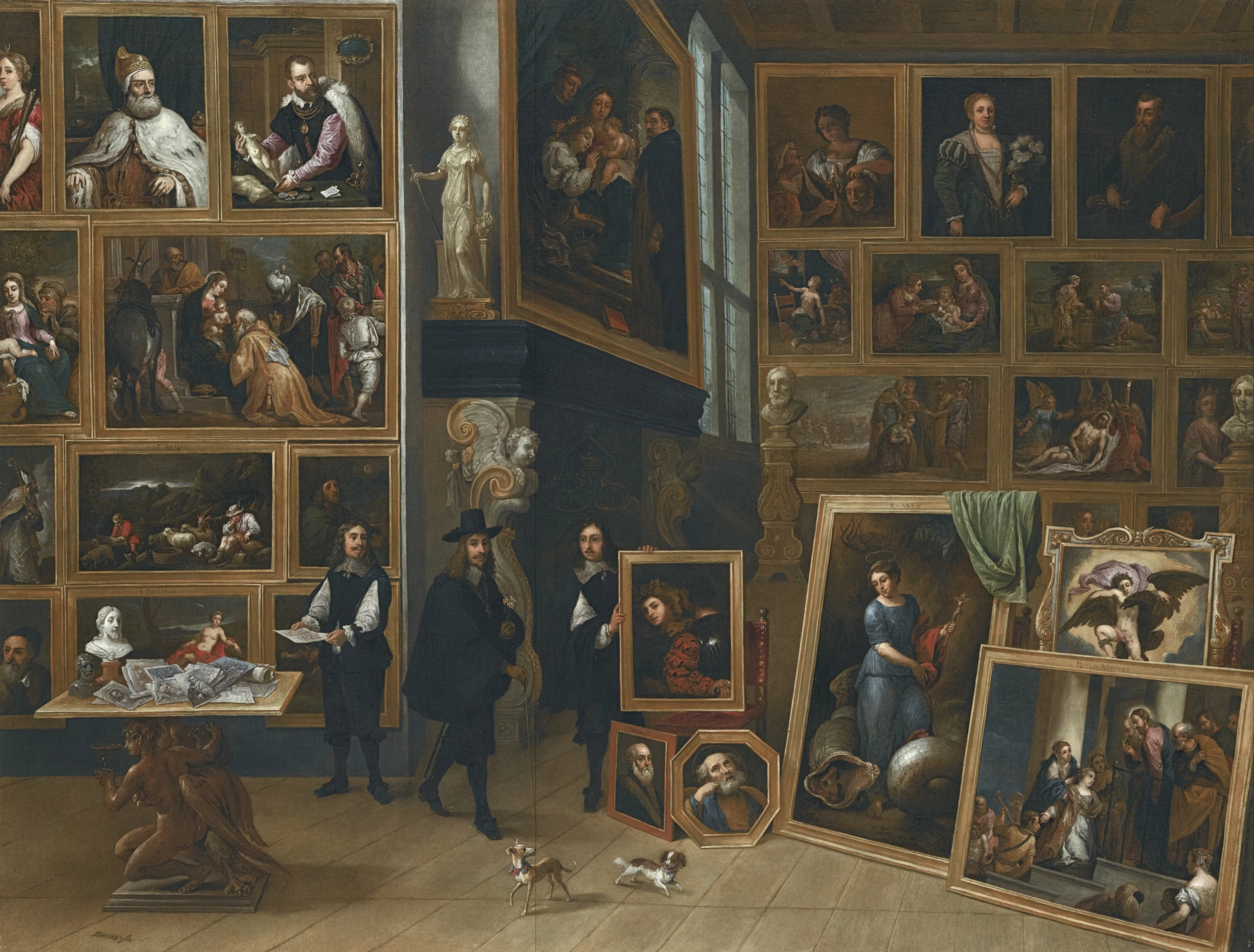
Archduke Leopold Wilhelm in his Art Gallery in Brussels, 1650s

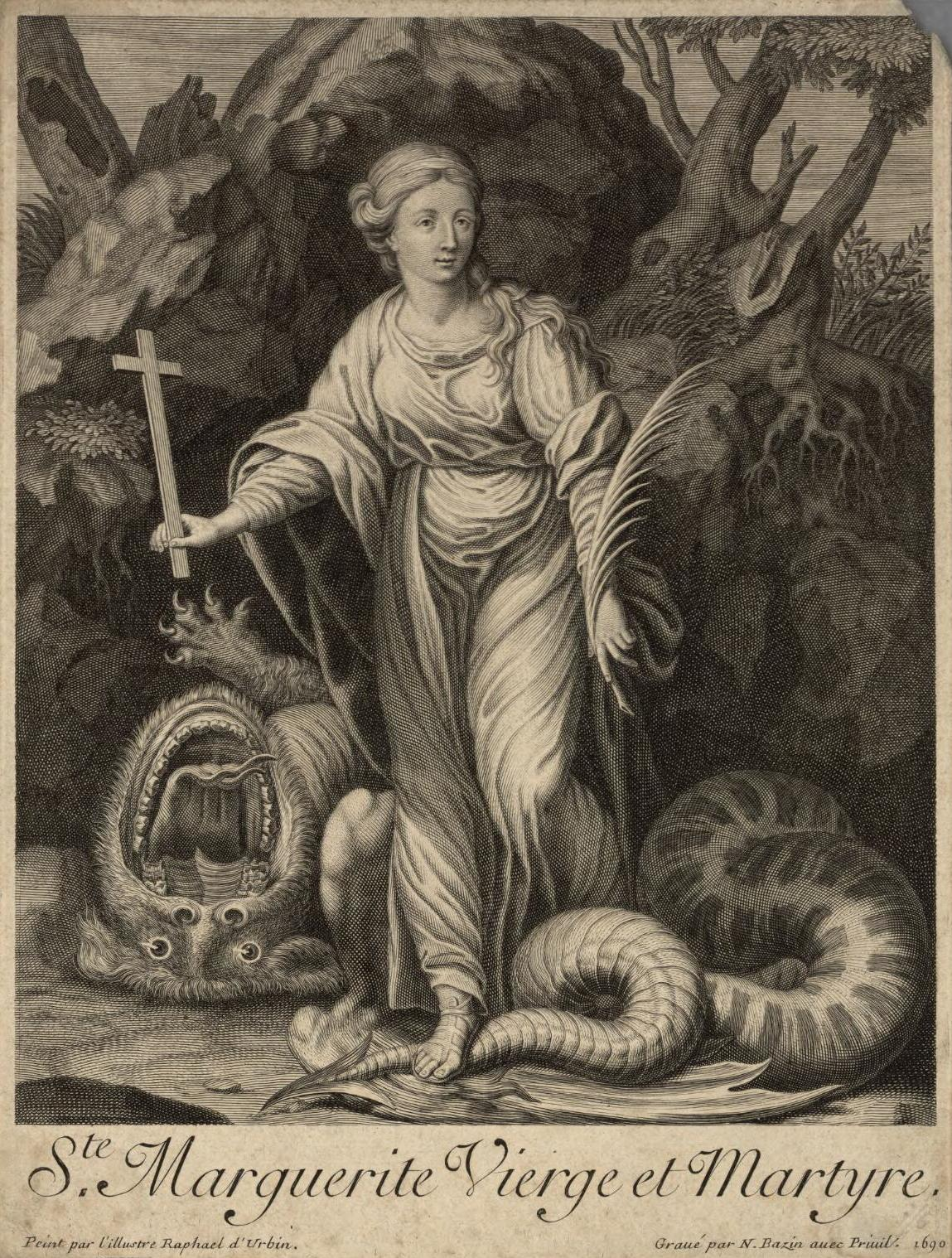
Engraving after the Louvre version by Nicolas Bazin, 1690

== See also ==
- List of paintings by Raphael
