= Saint Margaret and the Dragon (Titian) =

Painting by Titian

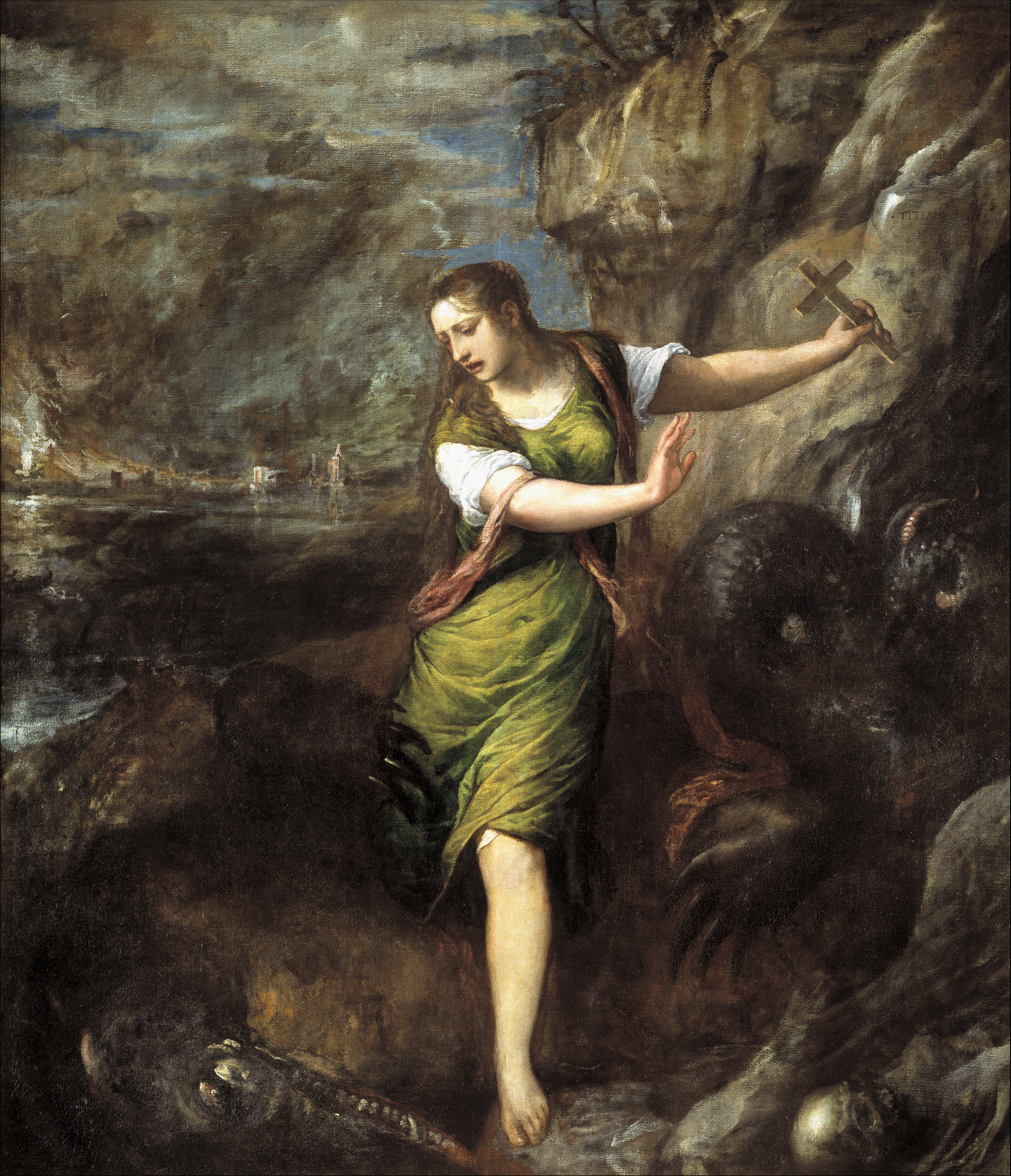
- Artist: Titian
- Year: c. 1559
- Medium: Oil on canvas
- Dimensions: 209 cm × 183 cm (82 in × 72 in)
- Location: Museo del Prado; Madrid

Saint Margaret and the Dragon is an oil on canvas painting by Titian, from c. 1559. It depicts Saint Margaret; it is now in the Museo del Prado, in Madrid.

In 2018 a version of it was sold at Sotheby's for $2,175,000.

== See also ==
- List of works by Titian
