= List of works by Titian =

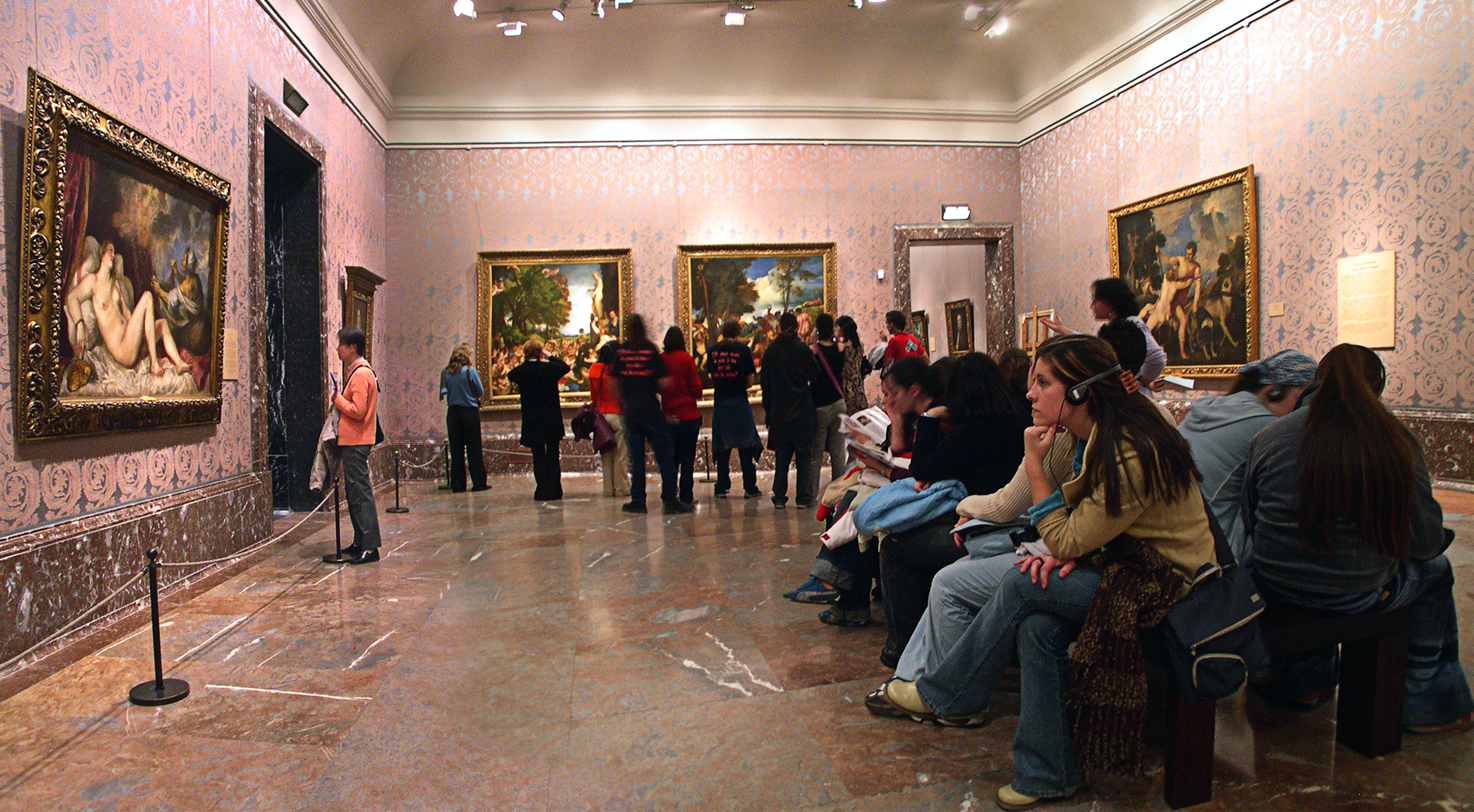
Titian paintings on display in the Museo del Prado (from left to right: Danaë and the Shower of Gold, The Worship of Venus, The Bacchanal of the Andrians, and Venus and Adonis)

This incomplete list of works by Titian contains representative portraits and mythological and religious works from a large oeuvre that spanned 70 years. (Titian left relatively few drawings.) Painting titles and dates often vary by source.

== List of works by year ==
Image	Title	Date	Dimensions	Collection
	Detroit Trio (The Appeal)	c. 1500	84.5 x 69.2 cm	Detroit Institute of Arts (Detroit). Also attributed to Giorgione and Sebastiano del Piombo
	Christ Carrying the Cross	1505	68.2 × 88.3 cm	Scuola Grande di San Rocco (Venice). Also attributed to Giorgione.
	Madonna and Child (Bache Madonna)	c. 1508	45 × 55 cm	Metropolitan Museum of Art (New York)
	Flight into Egypt	c. 1508	206 × 336 cm	Hermitage Museum (Saint Petersburg)
	Christ and the Adulteress	c. 1508–1510	139.3 × 181.7 cm	Kelvingrove Art Gallery and Museum (Glasgow)
	Portrait of a Man (A Man with a Quilted Sleeve)	c. 1508–1510	81.2 × 66.3 cm	National Gallery (London)
	Portrait of a Lady (La Schiavona)	c. 1509–1510	117 × 97 cm	National Gallery (London)
	Pastoral Concert	c. 1510	118 × 138 cm	Louvre (Paris)
	Portrait of a Man in a Red Cap	c. 1510	82 × 71 cm	Frick Collection (New York)
	The Lovers	c. 1510	74.5 x 65.2 cm	Royal Collection (Windsor). Attributed to Titian
	St. Mark Enthroned	1510/11	218 × 149 cm	Santa Maria della Salute (Venice)
	The Jealous Husband	1511	340 × 207 cm	Scuola del Santo, Padua
	Miracle of the Irascible Son	1511	340 × 207 cm	Scuola del Santo, Padua
	Miracle of the Newborn Infant	1511	340 × 355 cm	Scuola del Santo, Padua
	Noli me tangere	c. 1511–1515	109 × 91 cm	National Gallery (London)
	Woman with a Mirror	c. 1511–1515	96 × 76 cm	Louvre (Paris)
	An Unknown Man	c. 1512	73.7 x 62.2 cm	National Trust (Ickworth House)
	The Three Ages of Man	c. 1512	106 × 182 cm	National Gallery of Scotland (Edinburgh)
	Madonna and Child ("The Gypsy Madonna")	c. 1512	65.8 × 83.8 cm	Kunsthistorisches Museum (Vienna)
	Baptism of Christ	c. 1512	115 × 89 cm	Capitoline Museums (Rome)
	Balbi Holy Conversation (Madonna and Child with Sts. Catherine and Dominic and a Donor)	c. 1512-1514	130 × 185 cm	Magnani-Rocca Foundation (Traversetolo)
	The Archangel Raphael and Tobias	c. 1512-1514	170 × 146 cm	Gallerie dell'Accademia (Venice)
	Portrait of Jacopo Sannazaro	c. 1514–1518	85.7 × 72.7 cm	Royal Collection (United Kingdom)
	Flora	c. 1515	79 × 63 cm	Uffizi (Florence)
	Portrait of the Physician Gian Giacomo Bartolotti da Parma	c. 1515	88 × 75 cm	Kunsthistorisches Museum (Vienna)
	Portrait of a Man	c. 1515	50 × 45 cm	Metropolitan Museum of Art (New York)
	Salome	c. 1515	90 × 72 cm	Doria Pamphilj Gallery (Rome)
	Kirschenmadonna (Madonna of the Cherries)	c. 1515	81 × 99.5 cm	Kunsthistorisches Museum (Vienna)
	Vanity	c. 1515	97 × 81 cm	Alte Pinakothek (Munich)
	Violante	c. 1515–1516	64.5 × 51 cm	Kunsthistorisches Museum (Vienna)
	Lucretia and her Husband (or Tarquin and Lucretia, and possibly by Palma Vecchio)	c. 1515–1520	82 × 68 cm	Kunsthistorisches Museum (Vienna)
	An Unknown Man in a Black Plumed Hat	c. 1515–1520	70.5 × 63 cm	National Trust (Petworth House)
	Sacred and Profane Love	c. 1515–1516	118 × 279 cm	Galleria Borghese (Rome)
	The Tribute Money	c. 1516	75 × 56 cm	Gemäldegalerie Alte Meister, Dresden
	Assumption of the Virgin	c. 1516–1518	690 × 360 cm	Basilica di Santa Maria Gloriosa dei Frari (Venice)
	The Virgin and Child with Saint George and Saint Dorothy	c. 1516	86 × 130 cm	Prado Museum (Madrid)
	Virgin and Child with Saint John the Baptist and an Unidentified Saint	c. 1515–1520	62.7 x 93 cm	Duke of Sutherland, on loan to the Scottish National Gallery (Edinburgh)
	The Bacchanal of the Andrians	c. 1518–1519	175 × 193 cm	Museo del Prado (Madrid)
	The Worship of Venus	1518–1520	172 × 175 cm	Museo del Prado (Madrid)
	Malchiostro Annunciation	c. 1520	210 × 176 cm	Duomo, (Treviso)
	Christ and the Adulteress	c. 1520	82.5 × 136.5 cm	Kunsthistorisches Museum (Vienna)
	Virgin and Child with Saint Stephen, Saint Jerome and Saint Maurice	c. 1510–1525	112.5 × 143.2 cm	Louvre (Paris)
	Mary with Child and Saints Stephen, Jerome and Mauritius	c. 1520	93.3 × 138.2 cm	Kunsthistorisches Museum (Vienna)
	Portrait of Vincenzo Mosti	c. 1520	85 × 67 cm	Galleria Palatina, (Florence)
	Gozzi Altarpiece	1520	312 × 215 cm	Pinacoteca civica Francesco Podesti, (Ancona)
	Averoldi Polyptych	c. 1520–1522	278 × 292 cm	Santi Nazaro e Celso (Brescia)
	Venus Anadyomene	c. 1520	73.6 × 58.4 cm	National Gallery of Scotland (Edinburgh)
	Center panel of the Altarpiece of the Resurrection (the Averoldi Polyptych)	c. 1520–1522	278 × 122 cm	Santi Nazaro e Celso (Brescia)
	Bacchus and Ariadne	c. 1522–1523	175 × 190 cm	National Gallery (London)
	Man with a Glove	c. 1520–1523	100 × 89 cm	Louvre (Paris)
	The Entombment	c. 1523–1525	148 × 225 cm	Louvre (Paris)
	Pesaro Madonna	c. 1519–1526	478 × 268 cm	Basilica di Santa Maria Gloriosa dei Frari (Venice)
	Altarpiece of San Nicolò della Lattuga	c. 1522–1526	388 × 260 cm	Vatican Museums
	Portrait of Federico II Gonzaga	c. 1525–1528	125 × 99 cm	Museo del Prado (Madrid)
	Madonna and Child with Saint Catherine and a Rabbit	1530	71 × 85 cm	Louvre (Paris)
	Portrait of Giacomo di Andrea Dolfin	c. 1531–1532	101 × 88 cm	Los Angeles County Museum of Art (Los Angeles)
	Portrait of a Venetian Nobleman	after 1530	108.0 cm × 91.4 cm	Norton Simon Museum (Pasadena)
	Portrait of Ippolito de' Medici	1532–1533	139 x 107 cm	Palazzo Pitti (Florence)
	Madonna and Child with Saint John the Baptist and Saint Catherine (Aldobrandini Madonna)	c. 1532	100.6 × 142.2 cm	National Gallery (London)
	Portrait of Charles V with a Dog	c. 1532–1533	192 × 111 cm	Museo del Prado (Madrid)
	The Penitent Magdalene	c. 1531–1533	85 × 68 cm	Palazzo Pitti (Florence)
	The Presentation of the Virgin at the Temple	c. 1534–1538	345 x 775 cm	Gallerie dell'Accademia (Venice)
	Portrait of a Lady	c. 1525–1565	63.5 x 51.8 cm	Art Institute of Chicago (Chicago)
	Portrait of Giulia Gonzaga	c. 1530–1539	92 x 81 cm	Private collection (Italy)
	Portrait of Isabella d'Este	c. 1534–1536	102 × 64 cm	Kunsthistorisches Museum (Vienna)
	Girl in a Fur	c. 1535	95 × 63 cm	Kunsthistorisches Museum (Vienna)
	Pilgrims at Emmaus	c. 1533–1534	169 × 244 cm	Louvre (Paris)
	Supper at Emmaus	c. 1534	169 × 211 cm	Walker Art Gallery (Liverpool)
	Supper at Emmaus	c. 1545	163 × 200 cm	National Gallery of Ireland (Dublin)
	La Bella	1536	100 × 75 cm	Palazzo Pitti (Florence)
	Portrait of a Young Woman with Feather Hat	c. 1536	97 × 75 cm	Hermitage Museum (Saint Petersburg)
	Allegory of Marriage	c. 1530–1535	123 × 107 cm	Louvre (Paris)
	Portrait of Francesco Maria I della Rovere, Duke of Urbino	c. 1536–1538	114.3 × 100 cm	Uffizi (Florence)
	Portrait of Pietro Aretino	c. 1537	102 × 86 cm	Frick Collection (New York City)
	Portrait of a Man with a Falcon	c. 1537	109 × 94 cm	Joslyn Art Museum (Omaha)
	Portrait of Eleonora Gonzaga della Rovere	1538	114 × 102.2 cm	Uffizi (Florence)
	Venus of Urbino	1538	119 × 165 cm	Uffizi (Florence)
	Portrait of Count Antonio Porcia and Brugnera	c. 1535–1540	115 × 93 cm	Pinacoteca di Brera (Milan)
	Portrait of Benedetto Varchi	c. 1536–1540	119.3 × 92.7 cm	Kunsthistorisches Museum (Vienna)
	An Unknown Cardinal	1540-1550	97 x 66 cm	National Trust (Petworth House) Attributed to Titian
	Portrait of Cardinal Pietro Bembo	1540	94.3 × 76.5 cm	National Gallery of Art (Washington, D.C.)
	Portrait of Doge Andrea Gritti	c. 1546–1550	133.3 × 103.2 cm	National Gallery of Art (Washington, D.C.)
	Portrait of Pope Sixtus IV	c. 1540	109.5 × 87 cm	Uffizi (Florence)
	Sciarra Madonna	c. 1540		Museu Nacional d'Art de Catalunya (Barcelona)
	Alfonso d'Avalos Addressing His Troops	c. 1540–1541	223 × 165 cm	Museo del Prado (Madrid)
	Tobias and the Angel	c. 1540–1545	200 × 140 cm	Madonna dell'Orto, (Venice)
	Portrait of Clarissa Strozzi	1542	115 × 98 cm	Gemäldegalerie, Berlin
	The Crowning with Thorns	c. 1542–1544	303 × 180 cm	Louvre (Paris)
	Last Supper	c. 1542–1544	163 × 104 cm	Galleria Nazionale delle Marche (Urbino)
	Portrait of a Young Englishman	c. 1540–1545	111 × 93 cm	Palazzo Pitti (Florence)
	Portrait of Ranuccio Farnese	1542	89.7 × 73.6 cm	National Gallery of Art (Washington, D.C.)
	Portrait of Pope Paul III	1543	108 × 80 cm	Museo di Capodimonte (Naples)
	Ecce Homo	1543	242 × 361 cm	Kunsthistorisches Museum (Vienna)
	Cain Slaying Abel	1543–44	292.1 × 280.0 cm	Santa Maria della Salute (Venice)
	David and Goliath	1543–44	292.1 × 281.9 cm	Santa Maria della Salute (Venice)
	Abraham and Isaac	1542–44	328 cm × 285 cm	Santa Maria della Salute (Venice)
	Portrait of Pietro Aretino	c. 1545	98 × 78 cm	Palazzo Pitti (Florence)
	Portrait of Cardinal Alessandro Farnese	c.1545-1546		Museo di Capodimonte (Naples)
	Pope Paul III and His Grandsons	1546	210 × 174 cm	Museo di Capodimonte (Naples)
	Danaë (one of at least four versions)	1546	120 × 172 cm	Museo di Capodimonte (Naples)
	Portrait of the Vendramin Family	1547	206 × 301 cm	National Gallery (London)
	Equestrian Portrait of Charles V	1548	332 × 279 cm	Museo del Prado (Madrid)
	Portrait of Charles V Seated	1548	205 × 122 cm	Alte Pinakothek (Munich)
	Portrait of Isabella of Portugal	1548	117 × 93 cm	Museo del Prado (Madrid)
	Venus and Musician	1548	148 × 217 cm	Museo del Prado (Madrid)
	John Frederick I, Elector of Saxony in Armour	1548	129 × 93 cm	Museo del Prado (Madrid)
	Tityus	1549	253 × 217 cm	Museo del Prado (Madrid)
	Sisyphus	1549	237 × 216 cm	Museo del Prado (Madrid)
	Saint John the Almoner	c. 1549	229 × 156 cm	San Giovanni Elemosinario (Venice)
	The Fall of Man	c. 1550	240 × 186 cm	Museo del Prado (Madrid)
	Mater Dolorosa	1550	68 × 61 cm	Museo del Prado (Madrid)
	Portrait of John Frederick I, Elector of Saxony	1550–51	103.5 × 83 cm	Kunsthistorisches Museum (Vienna)
	Portrait of a Lady and Her Daughter	c.1550	88 × 80,7 cm	Rubenshuis (Antwerp)
	Venus with an Organist	c. 1550	115 × 280 cm	Gemäldegalerie, Berlin
	Mars, Venus and Amor	c. 1550	97 x 109 cm	Kunsthistorisches Museum (Vienna)
	Knight of Malta with a Watch	c. 1550	122 × 101 cm	Museo del Prado (Madrid)
	Penitent Magdalene	c. 1550		Museo di Capodimonte (Naples)
	Saint Jerome in Penitence	1550–1560	255 × 125 cm	Pinacoteca di Brera (Milan)
	Portrait of Philip II in Armour	1551	193 × 111 cm	Museo del Prado (Madrid)
	Portrait of Cardinal Cristoforo Madruzzo	1552	230 x 131 cm	São Paulo Museum of Art (São Paulo)
	The Holy Trinity (La Gloria)	1551–1554	346 × 240 cm	Museo del Prado (Madrid)
	Venus and Adonis - many different versions, with varying contributions by Titian himself. See ones in New York and Rome below.	1553–1554	186 × 207 cm	Museo del Prado (Madrid)
	Mater Dolorosa with Open Hands	1554	68 × 53 cm	Museo del Prado (Madrid)
	Christ Appearing to His Mother After His Resurrection	1554		
	Woman Holding an Apple	c. 1550–1555	97.8 × 73.8 cm	National Gallery of Art (Washington, D.C.)
	Danaë and the Shower of Gold	1554	128 × 178 cm	Museo del Prado (Madrid)
	Perseus and Andromeda	c. 1554–1556	175 × 189.5 cm	Wallace Collection (London)
	Portrait of Philip II	c. 1554		Museo di Capodimonte (Naples)
	Portrait of Queen Christina of Denmark	c. 1555–1556	112 × 83 cm	National Museum of Serbia (Belgrade)
	Venus with a Mirror	c. 1555	124.5 × 105.5 cm	National Gallery of Art (Washington, D.C.)
	Venus and Adonis - many different versions, with varying contributions by Titian himself. See one in the Prado above, and in Rome below.	c. 1555	106 × 133 cm	Metropolitan Museum of Art (New York)
	Filippo Archinto, Archbishop of Milan	c. 1555	118 × 94 cm	Metropolitan Museum of Art (New York)
	Venus and the Lute Player	c. 1555–1565	150 × 196 cm	Fitzwilliam Museum (Cambridge)
	Diana and Actaeon	1556–1559	190.3 × 207 cm	National Gallery (London)/ National Gallery of Scotland (Edinburgh)
	Portrait of Fabrizio Salvaresio	1558	112 × 88 cm	Kunsthistorisches Museum (Vienna)
	Crucifixion	1558	371 × 197 cm	Church of San Domenico, (Ancona)
	The Martyrdom of Saint Lawrence	1559	500 × 280 cm	I Gesuiti (Venice)
	Diana and Callisto	1559	187 × 205 cm	National Gallery (London) / National Gallery of Scotland (Edinburgh)
	The Entombment	1559	137 × 175 cm	Museo del Prado (Madrid)
	The Rape of Europa	1559–1562	185 × 205 cm	Isabella Stewart Gardner Museum (Boston)
	Annunciation	1559–1564	410 × 240 cm	San Salvador (Venice)
	The Death of Actaeon	c. 1559–1575	178.4 × 198.1 cm	National Gallery (London)
	Salome	c. 1560	87 × 80 cm	Museo del Prado (Madrid)
	Girl with a Platter of Fruit	c. 1558	102 x 82 cm	Gemäldegalerie (Berlin)
	Venus and Adonis - many different versions, with varying contributions by Titian himself. See ones in the Prado and New York above.	c. 1560	187 × 184 cm	Galleria Nazionale d'Arte Antica (Rome)
	Madonna and Child with Saints Luke and Catherine of Alexandria	c. 1560	127.8 × 169.7 cm	(Bought by a private bidder on 28 January 2011)
	Nicolò Zen	c. 1560-1565	125.7 x 96.8 cm	National Trust (Kingston Lacy)
	Self-portrait	c. 1560–1562	96 × 72 cm	Gemäldegalerie, Berlin
	The Tribute Money	c. 1560–1568	112.2 x 103.2 cm	National Gallery (London)
	The Penitent Magdalene	c. 1565	118 × 97 cm	Hermitage Museum (Saint Petersburg)
	Saint Dominic	c. 1565	97 × 80 cm	Galleria Borghese, (Rome)
	Allegory of Prudence	c. 1565–1570	76.2 × 68.6 cm	National Gallery (London)
	Venus and a Lute Player	c. 1565-1570	165 × 209 cm	Metropolitan Museum of Art (New York)
	The Entombment	1566	130 × 168 cm	Museo del Prado (Madrid)
	Self-portrait	c. 1567	86 × 65 cm	Museo del Prado (Madrid)
	Portrait of Jacopo Strada	c. 1567–1568	125 × 95 cm	Kunsthistorisches Museum (Vienna)
	Judith with the Head of Holofernes	c. 1570	113 × 95.3 cm	Detroit Institute of Arts (Detroit)
	Salome	c. 1570	114 × 96 cm	Private collection
	Salome	c. 1560–1570	90 × 83.3 cm	National Museum of Western Art (Tokyo). Attributed to Titian and workshop
	Tarquin and Lucretia	1571	189 × 145 cm	Fitzwilliam Museum (Cambridge)
	Punishment of Marsyas	c. 1570-1576	212 × 207 cm	National Museum, (Kroměříž)
	Nymph and Shepherd	c. 1570–1576	149.7 × 187 cm	Kunsthistorisches Museum (Vienna)
	Pietà	c. 1570–1576	351 × 389 cm	Gallerie dell'Accademia (Venice)
	The Crowning with Thorns	c. 1570–1576	280 × 181 cm	Alte Pinakothek (Munich)
