= Saint Jerome in Penitence (Titian, 1575) =

C. 1575 painting by Titian

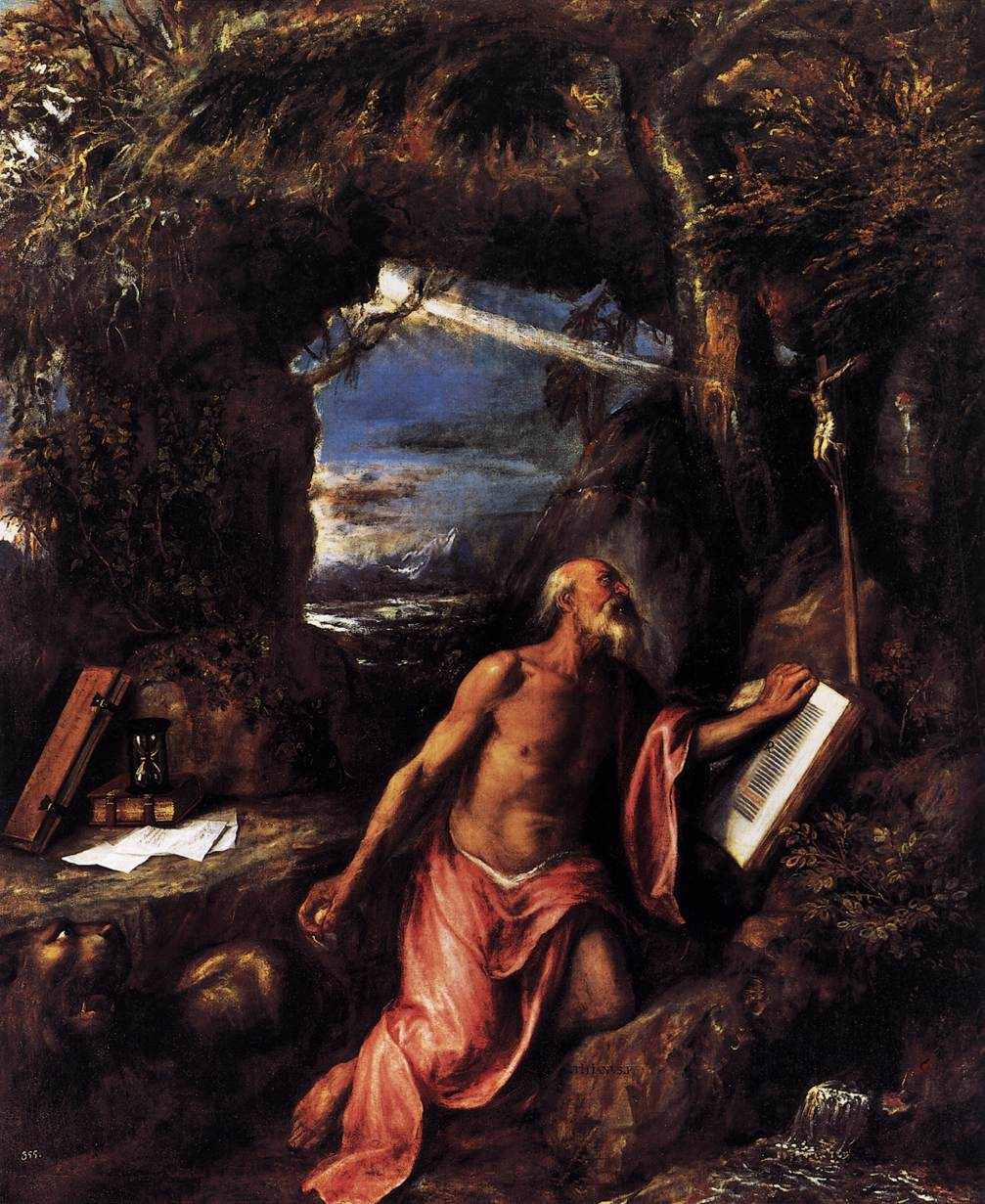
- Artist: Titian
- Year: c. 1575
- Medium: oil on canvas
- Dimensions: 255 cm × 125 cm (100 in × 49 in)
- Location: Nuevos Museos, El Escorial, Madrid, Spain

Saint Jerome in Penitence is a c.1575 painting of Saint Jerome by Titian, now in the Nuevos Museos in the El Escorial. It was painted for King Philip II.

Titian depicted Saint Jerome in two other paintings: a 1531 painting, held in the Louvre, in Paris, and a 1552 painting, held in the Pinacoteca di Brera, in Milan.

== See also ==
- List of works by Titian
