= Portrait of Giacomo Doria =

Painting by Titian

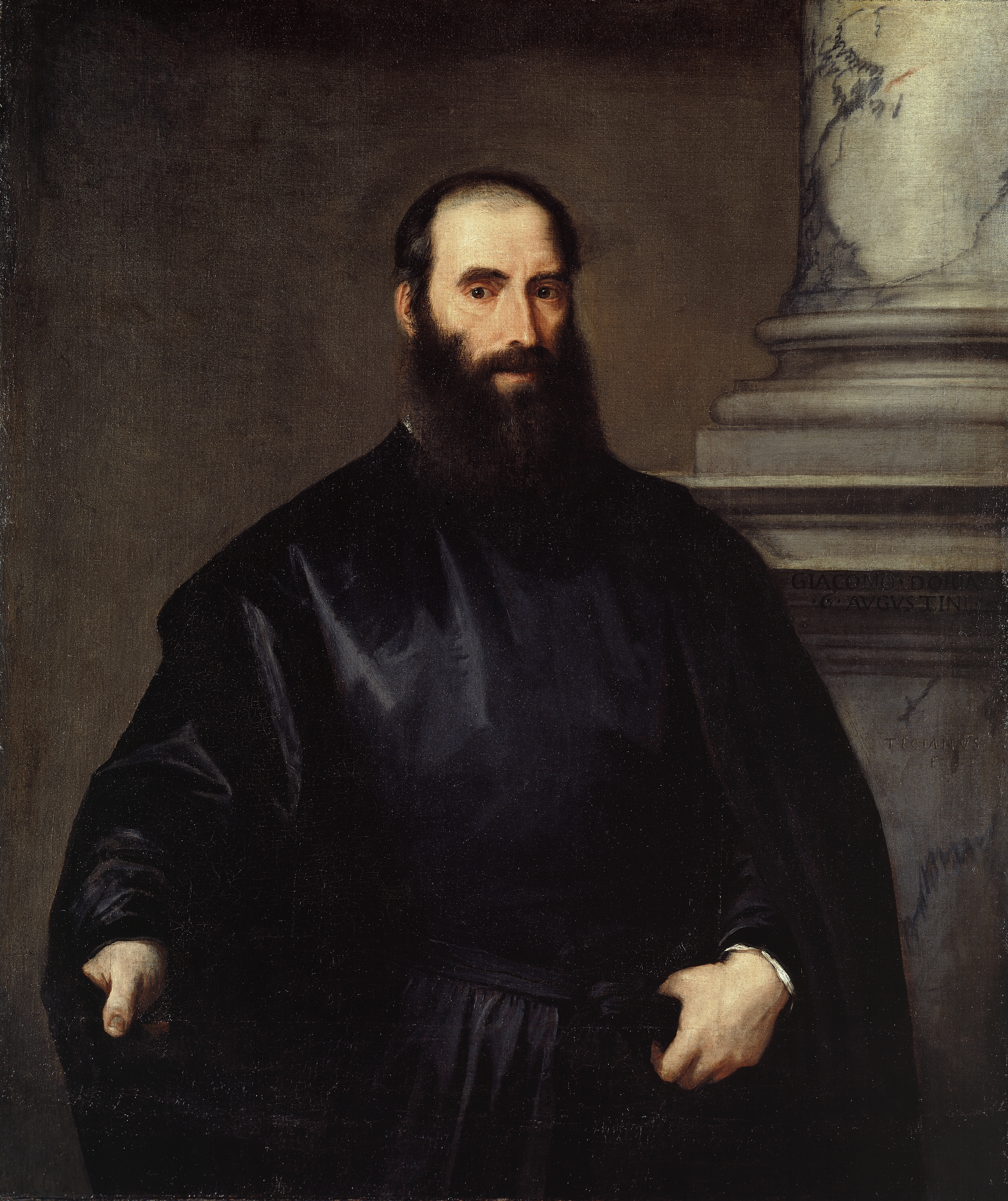
- Artist: Titian
- Medium: Oil on canvas
- Dimensions: 115.7 cm × 97.7 cm (45.6 in × 38.5 in)
- Location: Ashmolean Museum; Oxford

Portrait of Giacomo Doria is an oil on canvas portrait of Giacomo Doria by Titian, painted in 1533–1535. It is held in the Ashmolean Museum, in Oxford.

== See also ==
- List of works by Titian
