= Mater Dolorosa with Clasped Hands =

Painting by Titian

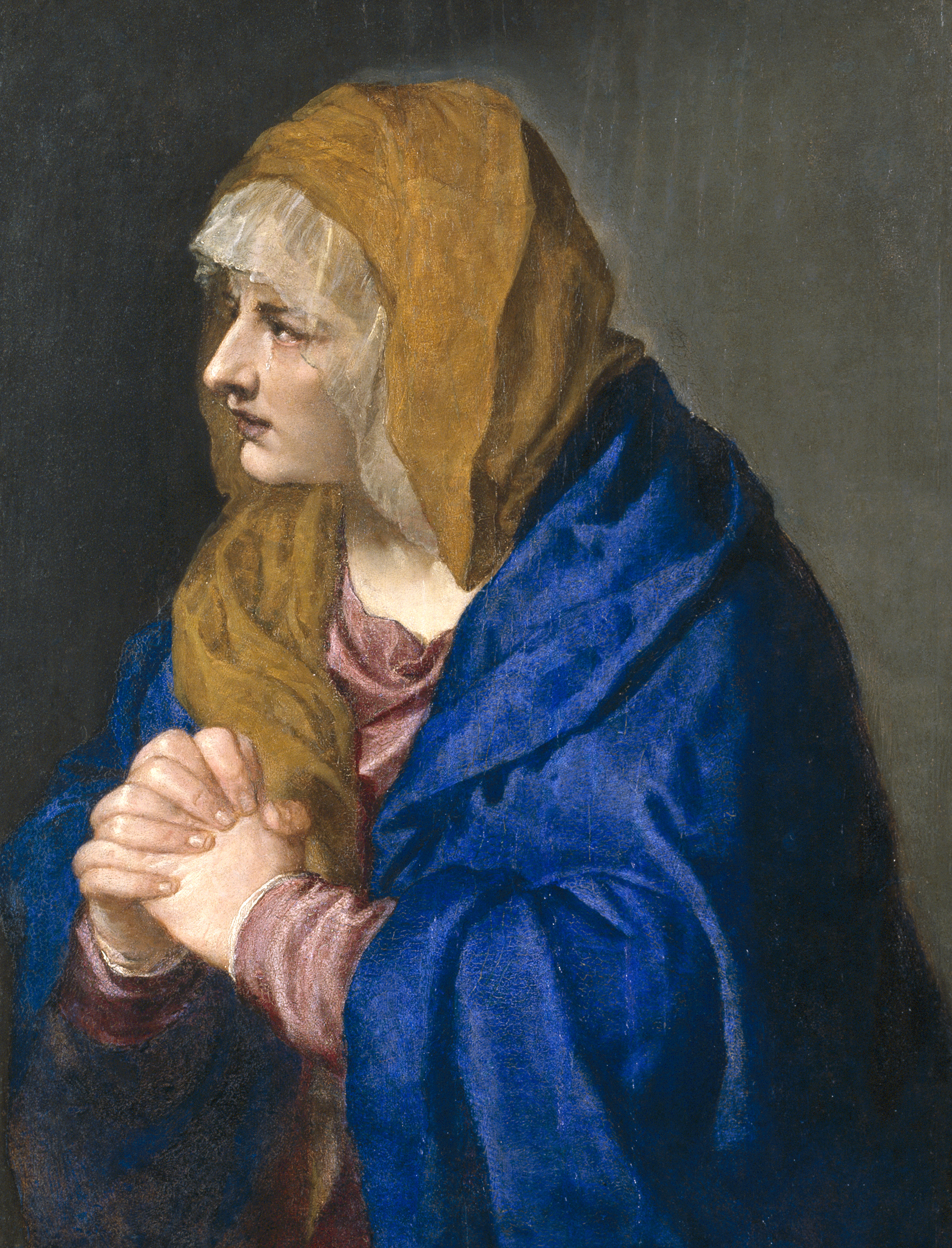
- Artist: Titian and studio
- Year: c. 1550-1555
- Medium: oil on canvas
- Dimensions: 68 cm × 61 cm (27 in × 24 in)
- Location: Museo del Prado; Madrid

Mater Dolorosa with Clasped Hands is an oil on canvas painting of the Mater Dolorosa (Our Lady of Sorrows) by Titian and his studio, created c. 1550-1555. It is now in the Museo del Prado, in Madrid. It is not to be confused with his c.1554 version of the same subject, also in the Prado.

== See also ==
- List of works by Titian
