= Portrait of John Frederick I, Elector of Saxony =

Painting by Titian

John Frederick, Elector of Saxony
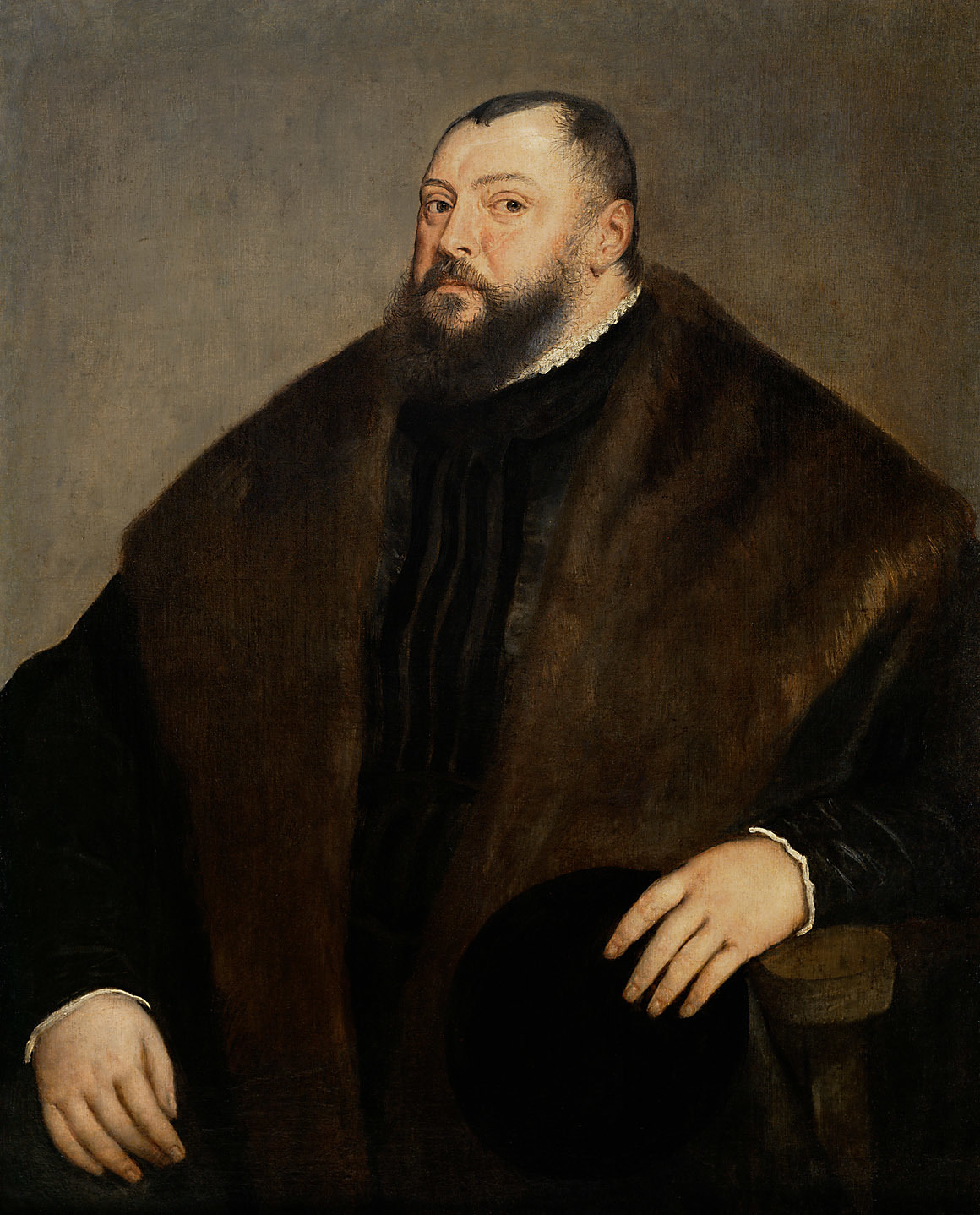
- Artist: Titian
- Year: c. 1550–1551
- Catalogue: GG100
- Medium: Oil on canvas
- Dimensions: 103.5 cm × 83 cm (40.7 in × 33 in)
- Location: Kunsthistorisches Museum; Vienna

Portrait of John Frederick I, Elector of Saxony (German: Kurfürst Johann Friedrich von Sachsen) is an oil on canvas painting by the Venetian painter Titian, made in late 1550 or early 1551. The painting is in the collection of the Kunsthistorisches Museum, in Vienna.

== History ==
During his two stays at Augsburg, Titian painted all the monarchs, electors and other royalty there at the time, but many of these portraits are now lost. There remain, however, the Portrait of Charles V in Munich, and the famous Equestrian Portrait in Madrid. The centre of interest, however, was the Elector John Frederick of Saxony, then a prisoner. Titian's activity at the court of Charles V was confined not to a single visit but to two, broken by a return to Venice. He was summoned again to Augsburg to paint the heir, Philip II, and a letter dated 11 November 1550 describes his second reception by the Emperor. It was to this second stay, probably, that we owe the portrait of the captive Elector of Saxony, which is now preserved at Vienna. He was painted by Titian at least twice; once with a scar on his face in armour, the second time (the subject of this article) in a black robe edged with sable, sitting in an armchair.

== Analysis ==
According to Georg Gronau, this portrait "shows Titian’s handiwork everywhere", in spite of serious damage. According to Charles Ricketts, all photographs of the Portrait of the Elector are unsatisfactory.

== Provenance ==
Done in Augsburg in 1548 or 1550. A picture of this Prince, together with another in full armour, is described in the collection of Queen Mary in 1558. Philip IV of Spain presented the Marquis de Leganes with it. At Vienna it is first mentioned in the seventeenth century.

== Gallery ==
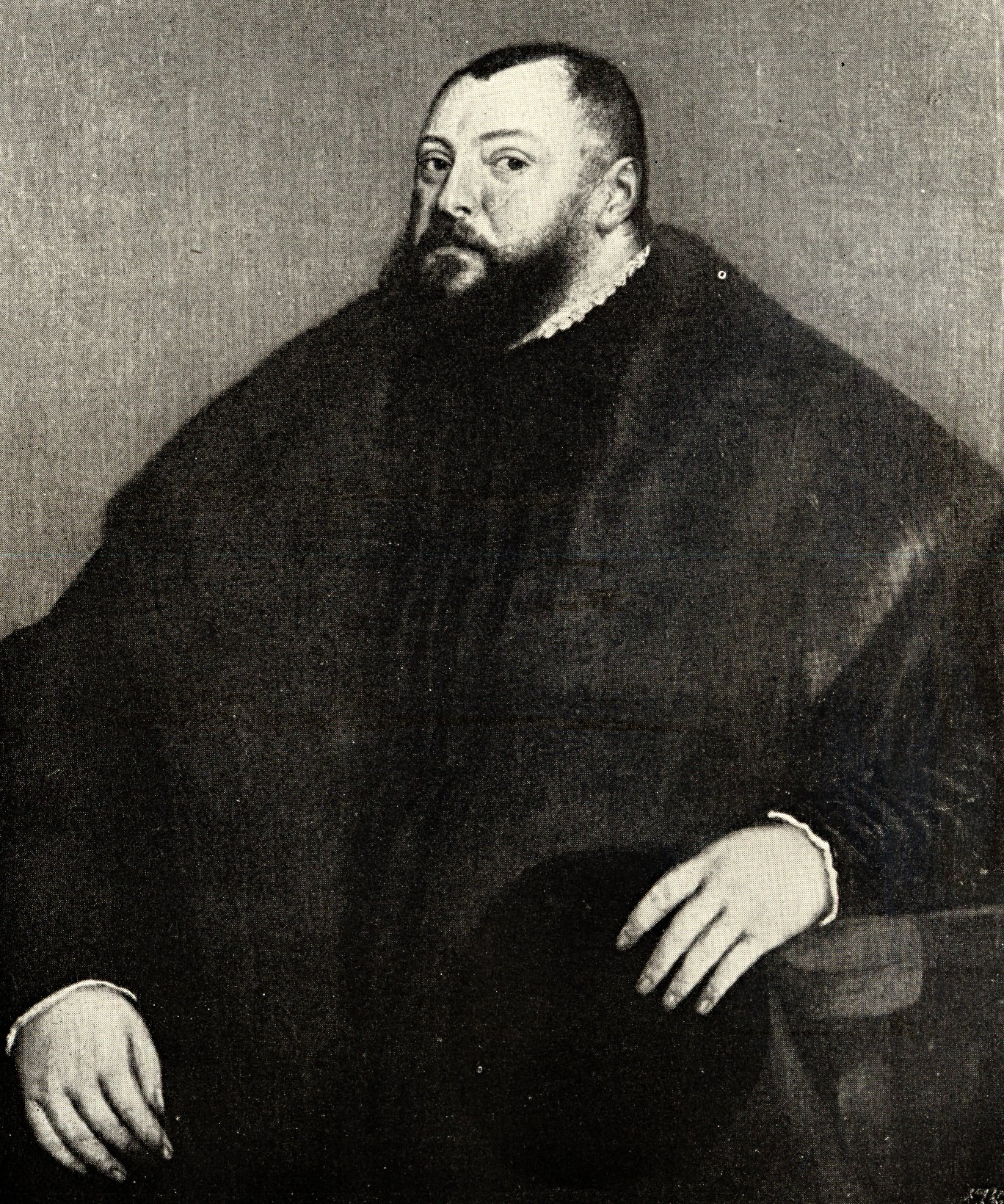

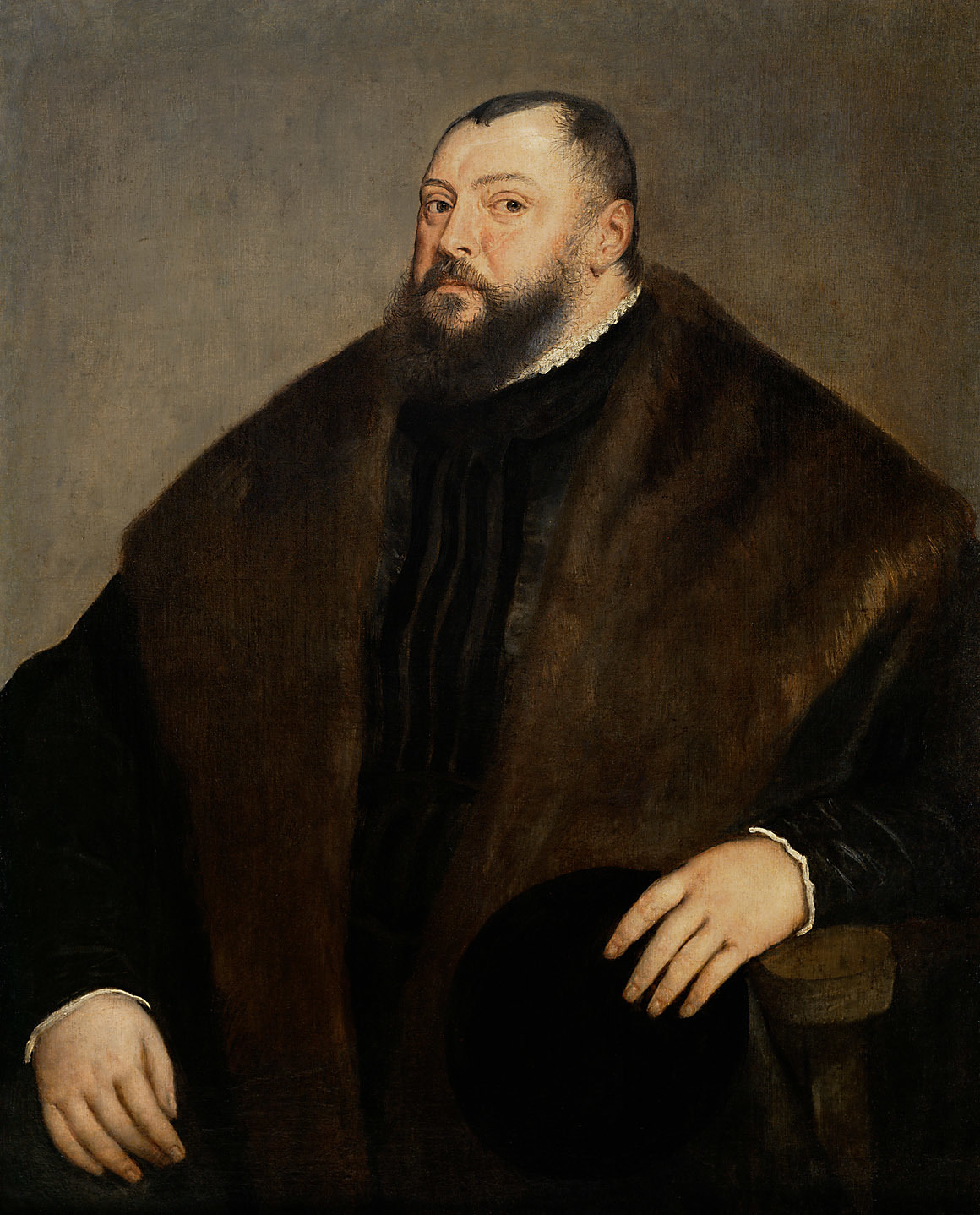

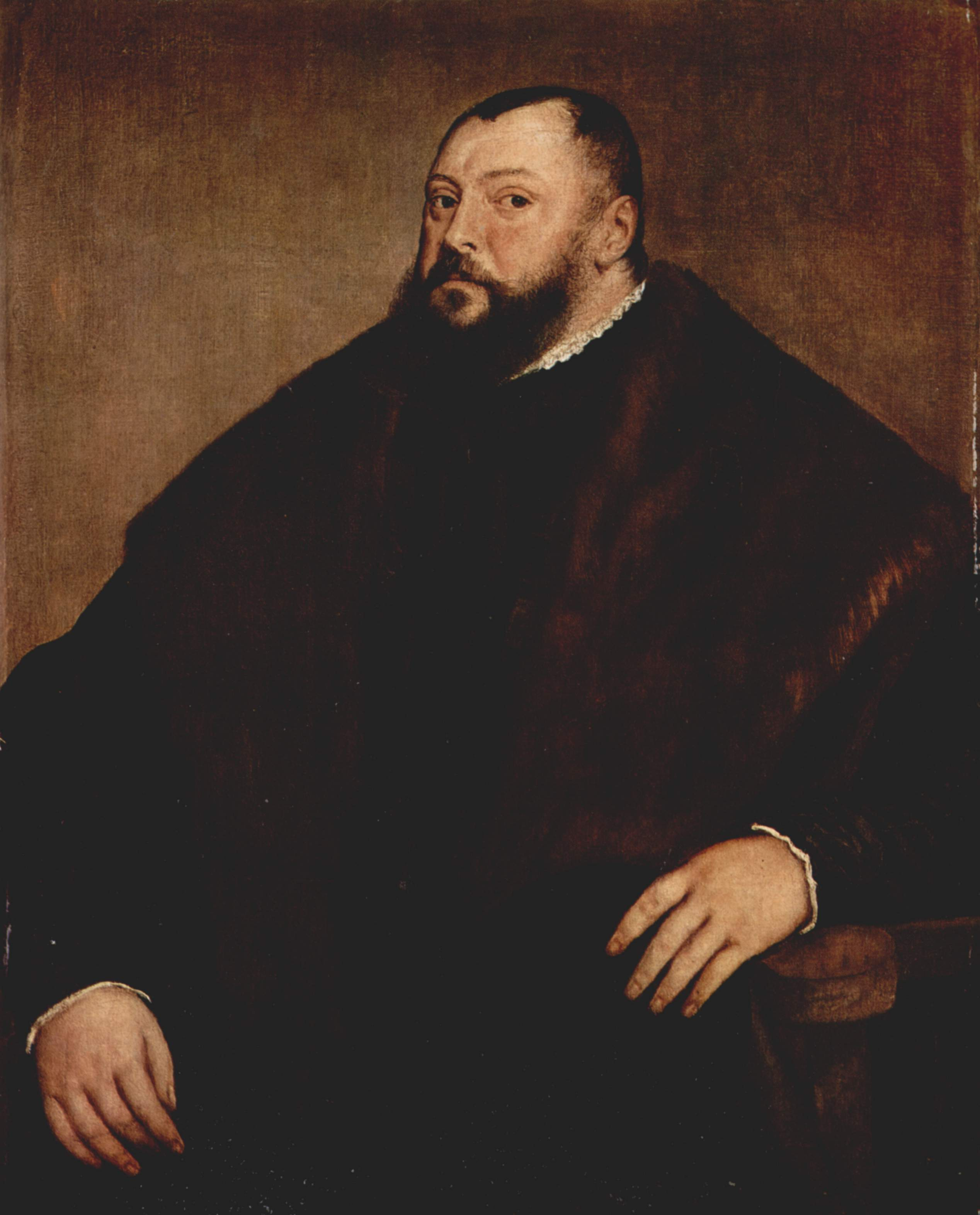

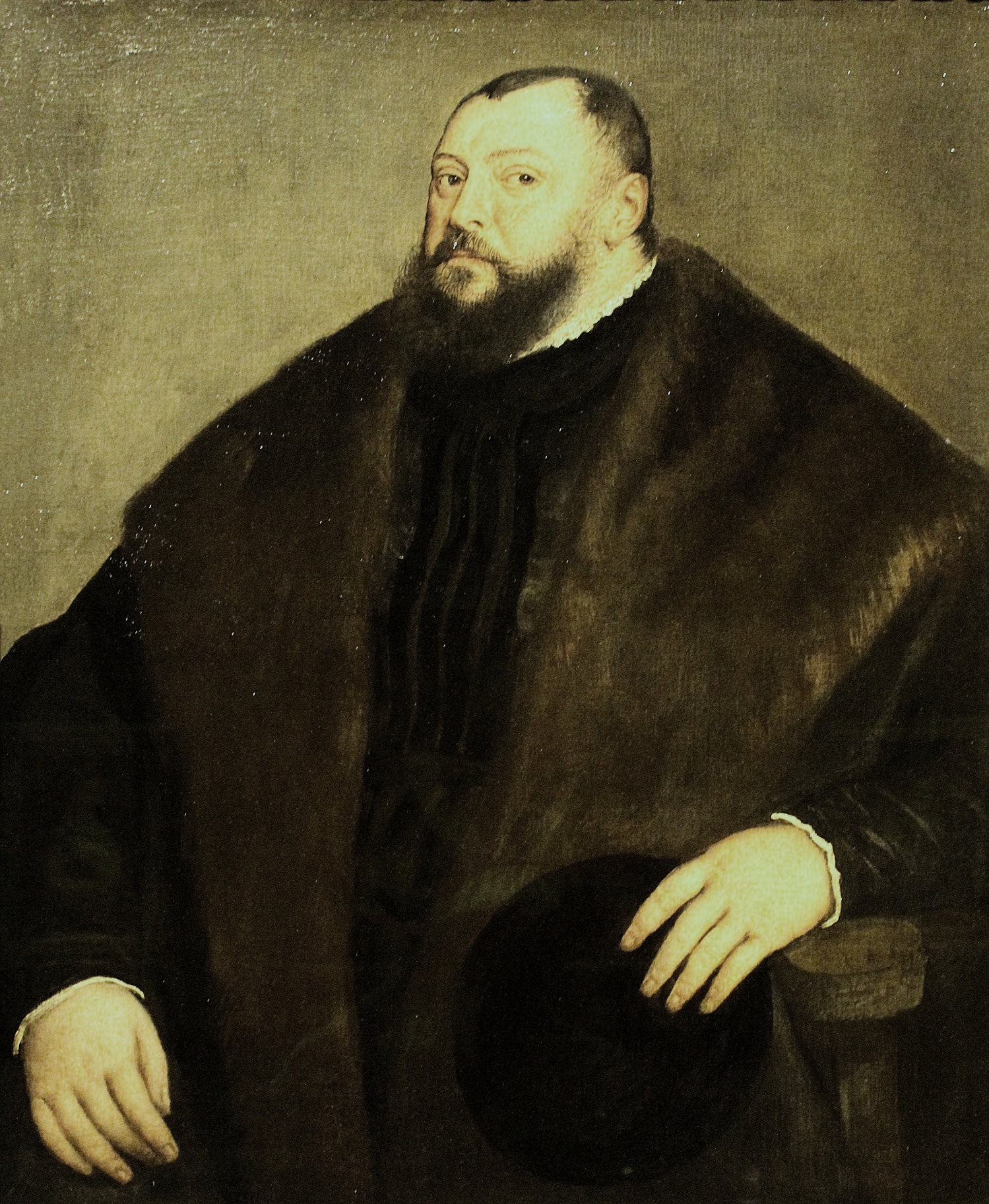

== See also ==
- List of works by Titian

== Sources ==
- Gronau, Georg (1904). Titian. London: Duckworth and Co; New York: Charles Scribner's Sons. pp. 148–152, 277.
- Ricketts, Charles (1910). Titian. London: Methuen & Co. Ltd. pp. 117–119, plate cxi.
- "Juan Federico I de Sajonia". Colección. Museo del Prado. Accessed 5 September 2022.
- "Kurfürst Johann Friedrich von Sachsen". Kunsthistorisches Museum. Accessed 29 August 2022.
