= Penitent Magdalene (Titian, 1565) =

1560s painting by Titian

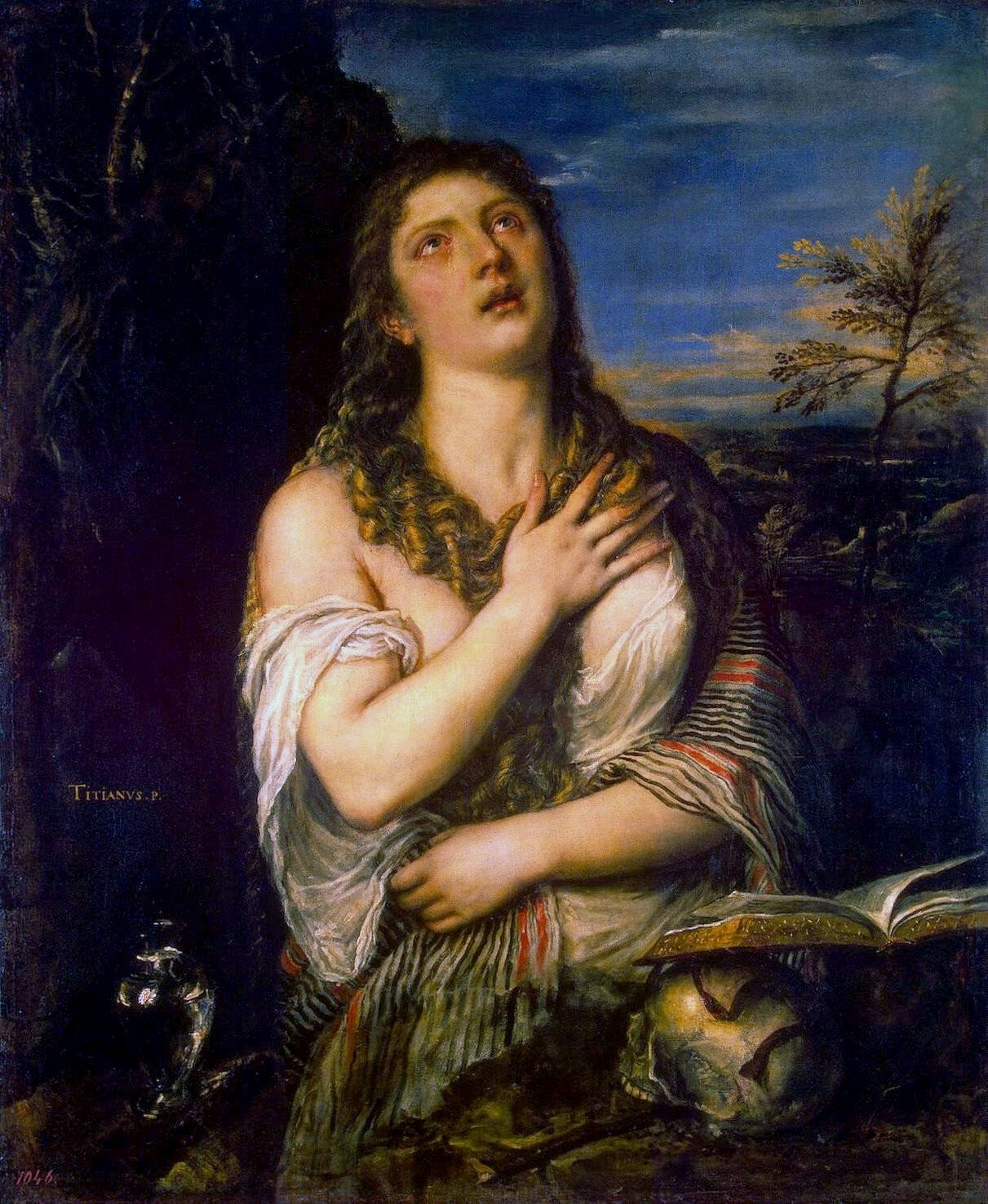
- Artist: Titian
- Year: 1560s
- Medium: oil on canvas
- Movement: Venetian School
- Dimensions: 119 cm × 98 cm (47 in × 39 in)
- Location: Hermitage Museum; Saint Petersburg
- Accession: ГЭ-117

The Penitent Magdalene (titled Repentant Mary Magdalene in the Hermitage) is an oil on canvas painting by Titian, from the c. 1560s. It depicts Saint Mary Magdalene. it is held in the Hermitage Museum, in Saint Petersburg.

== History and description ==
The painting depicts Mary Magdalene who spent many years in the desert atoning for her sins. She looks to Heaven, with a tearful expression. The background is very dark, specially at the left. The darkening sky, at the right, shows a tree that seems to be facing the wind. Unlike his 1531 version of the same subject, Titian has covered Mary's nudity and introduced a vase, an open book and a skull as a memento mori. Its colouring is more mature than the earlier work, using colours harmonising with character. In the background the sky is bathed in the rays of the setting Sun, with a dark rock contrasting with the brightly lit figure of Mary.

== Provenance ==
The artwork was acquired from the Barbarigo Gallery in Venice, Italy and entered the Hermitage in 1850. Titian had kept this painting for himself and after his death Titian's son sold it along with other paintings to Cristoforo Barbarigo.

== See also ==
- List of works by Titian

== Sources ==
- (in Polish) Wielkie muzea. Palazzo Pitti, wyd. HPS, Warszawa 2007, ISBN 978-83-60688-42-7
- (in Polish) J. Szapiro Ermitraż (translated Maria Dolińska), Wydawnictwo Progress, Moskwa, 1976
