= Portrait of a Man with a Falcon =

Painting by Titian

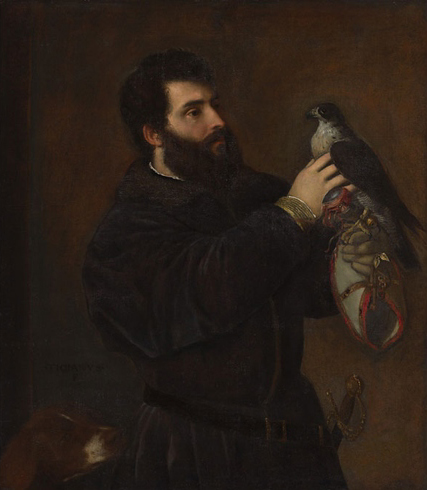
- Artist: Titian
- Year: c. 1525–1537
- Medium: Oil on canvas
- Dimensions: 109 cm × 94 cm (43 in × 37 in)
- Location: Joslyn Art Museum; Omaha
- Accession: 1942.3

Portrait of a Man with a Falcon, also called Portrait of a Man of the Cornaro Family with a Falcon or Giorgio Cornaro with a Falcon, is an oil on canvas painting by the Italian painter Titian. It is variously dated from the late 1520s to the 1540s. The painting is in the collection of the Joslyn Art Museum in Omaha.

== History ==
The Joslyn Art Museum dates this portrait to the late 1520s and attributes it to Titian alone, although this attribution is not accepted by some modern scholars. According to Georg Gronau, it was painted in Titian's middle period, about 1530 to 1540.

The work was "sadly damaged" by the time it went to the United States in the early 1900s, and some students of Venetian art then thought it a copy. Charles Ricketts thought this impression was due mainly to the repainting, in brown, of the background, formerly grey, with the consequent weakening of the contours and falsifying of the shadows; and the reduction in the quality of the pigment by ironing or relining. Extensive conservation work was completed by senior conservator Mark Leonard at the Getty Museum in 2008.

== Provenance ==
The picture was formerly in Castle Howard, Yorkshire. It was sold to the private collector E. F. Milliken of New York some time before 1904. The New York Times states that the painting belonged to Seth Milliken. E. F. Milliken may be an error in transcription. The painting was purchased by the Josyln Art Museum in Omaha, Nebraska in the early 1940s and has remained there since.

== Description ==
Turning with animation to the right, the sitter is trying a falcon which he holds on his left hand. The head is slightly thrown back, the right side, together with the right hand, which is feeling the falcon, is placed in strong light. A neutral grey background, somewhat lighter close round the figure, sets in strong relief the form attired in black. The head of a pointer can be seen, just appearing in the left-hand lower corner, gazing up at his master.

== Analysis ==
Although it is not known for certain, the subject of the painting may be Giorgio Cornaro the Younger (1517–1571), from the prominent Venetian Cornaro family; or possibly one of Titian’s princely patrons, as the Duke of Mantua.

== See also ==
- List of works by Titian

== Sources ==
- Averett, Matthew Knox (2011). "Becoming Giorgio Cornaro: Titian's "Portrait of a Man with a Falcon"". Zeitschrift Für Kunstgeschichte, 74(4). pp. 559–568.
- Gronau, Georg (1904). Titian. London: Duckworth and Co; New York: Charles Scribner's Sons. pp. 82–83, 307.
- Knight, Christopher (23 September 2008). "The Getty restores a Titian for Nebraska". Los Angeles Times. Retrieved 29 October 2022.
- Ricketts, Charles (1910). Titian. London: Methuen & Co. Ltd. p. 96, plate lxxvii.
- "Portrait of a Man of the Cornaro Family with a Falcon". Joslyn Art Museum.
- "Titian: Giorgio Cornaro with a Falcon". Northbrook Provenance. Carnegie Museum of Art. Retrieved 29 October 2022.
