= The Virgin and Child with Saint George and Saint Dorothy =

C. 1516 painting by Titian

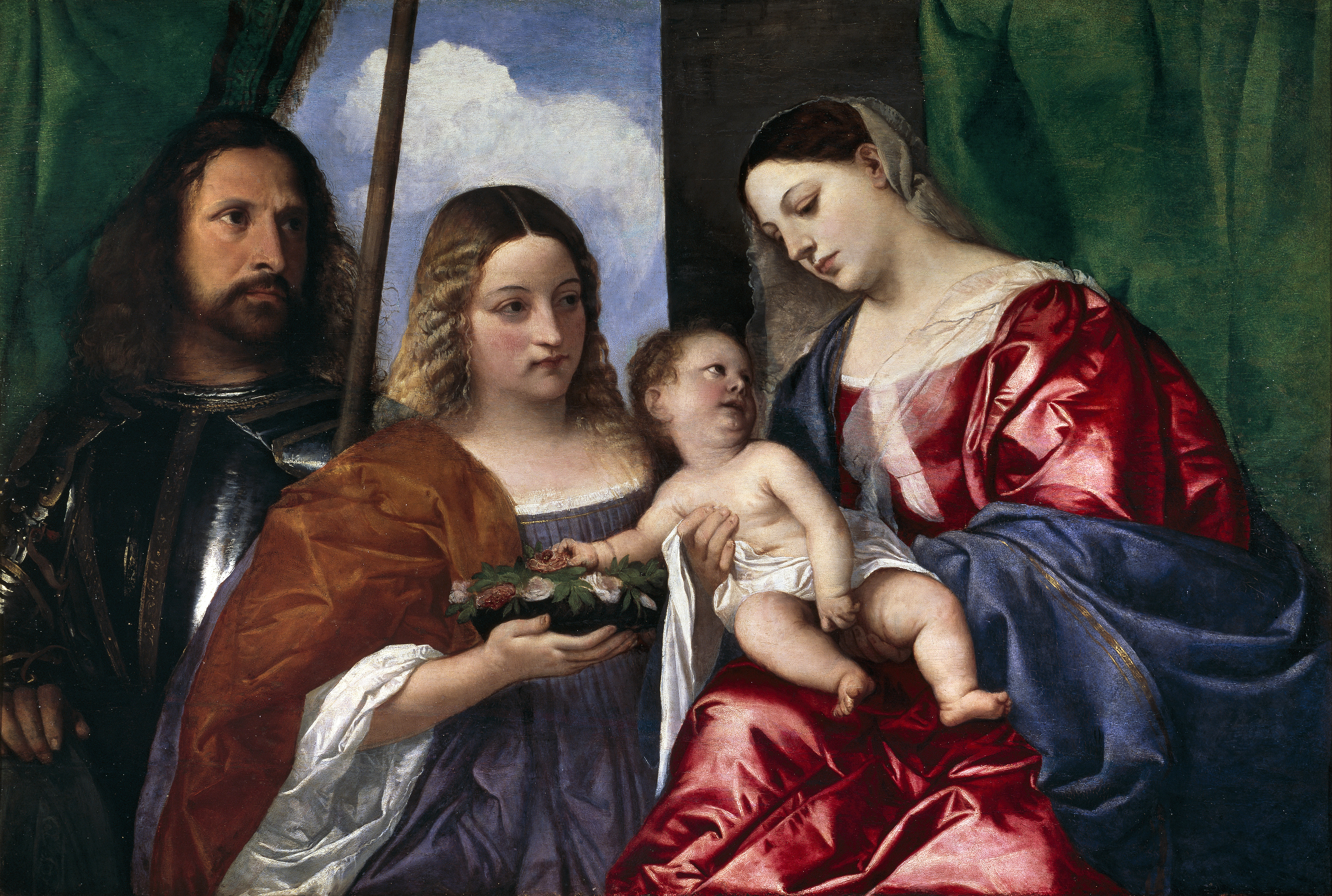
The Virgin and Child with Saints Dorothy and George (c. 1516) by Titian

The Virgin and Child with Saints Dorothy and George is an oil on panel painting by Titian, from c. 1516. It is held now in the Museo del Prado, in Madrid, to which it was transferred in 1839.

It was the first painting by the artist to be acquired by Philip II of Spain, who sent it to the Escorial, in 1593. It belongs to the sacra conversazione genre and belongs to a series of portrayals of the Madonna and Child with saints by Titian in the 1510s and 1520s, usually in a horizontal format and intended for private devotion. The model for the figure of Saint Dorothy also appears in several of his half-length allegorical works (Flora and Vanitas for example), she was possibly the painter's lover.

== See also ==
- List of works by Titian
