= Balbi Holy Conversation =

1513 painting by Titian

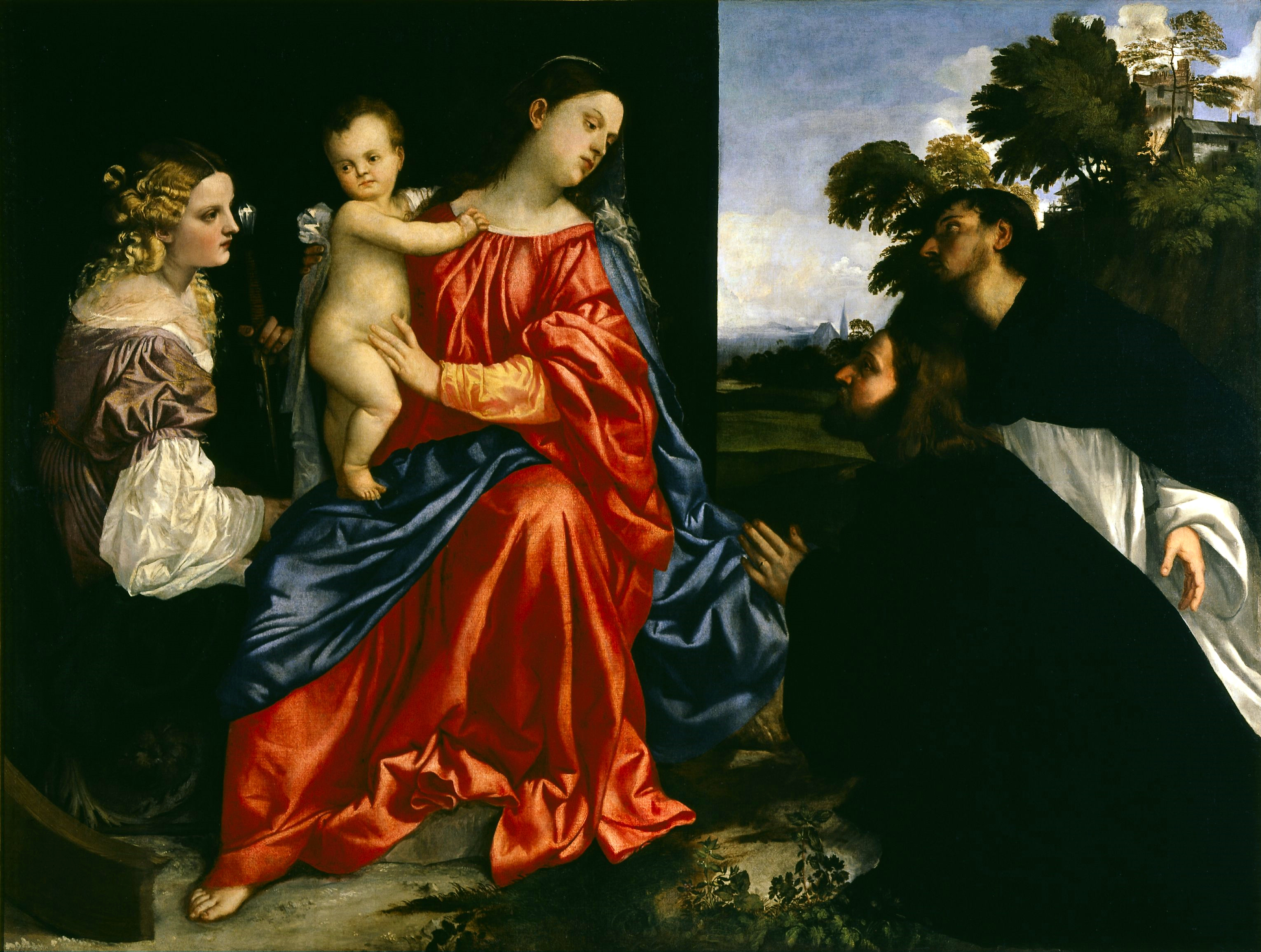
- Artist: Titian
- Year: c. 1513
- Medium: Oil on canvas
- Dimensions: 137 cm × 184 cm (54 in × 72 in)
- Location: Fondazione Magnani-Rocca; Traversetolo

Balbi Holy Conversation (Italian: Sacra conversazione, also known as Titian Madonna and Child with Sts Catherine and Dominic and a Donor) is an oil painting by the Italian late Renaissance painter Titian, dated to c. 1513. It is now held at the Fondazione Magnani-Rocca, in Traversetolo, near Parma.

The work was originally part of marquess Balbi's collection at Genoa, hence the name. It is a work from the artist's youth, set in an open landscape, with some Giorgione influences but already some personal elements, such as the asymmetrical composition and the full figures.

== See also ==
- List of works by Titian

== Sources ==
- Valcanover, Francesco (1969). L'opera completa di Tiziano (in Italian). Milan: Rizzoli.
