= Saint Dominic (Titian) =

c. 1565 painting by Titian

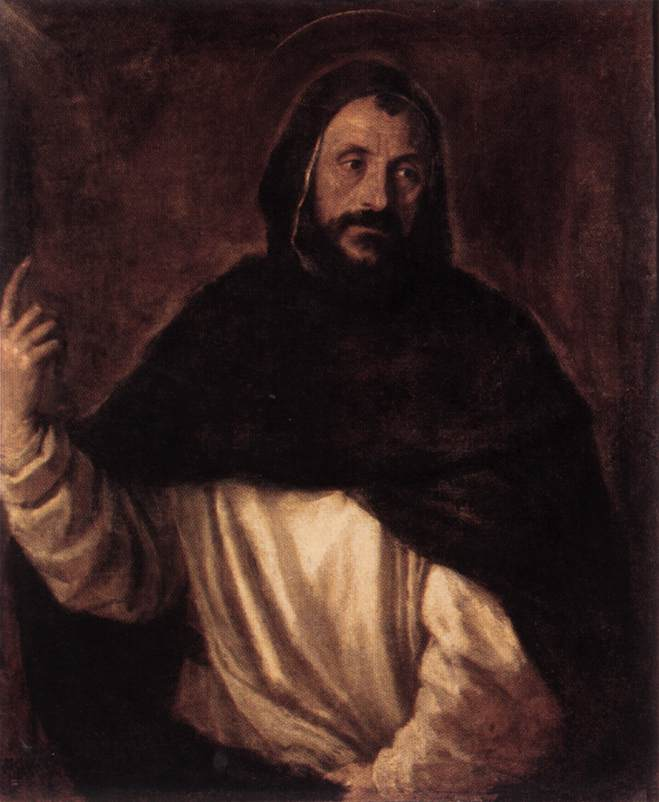
Saint Dominic (c. 1565) by Titian

Saint Dominic is an oil on canvas painting of Saint Dominic by Titian, from c. 1565. It is held in the Galleria Borghese, in Rome.

== Description ==
The painting depicts Saint Dominic de Guzmán, the founder of the Dominican Order. The saint is shown with the typical Dominican habit, with a white tunic, and a black cloak, with an hood on his head, in a brown background. He raises his left hand towards the sky, while around his head there is a thin white halo, as a symbol of his sainthood.

== See also ==
- List of works by Titian
