= Portrait of a Lady (Titian, Chicago) =

Painting by, or possible after, Titian

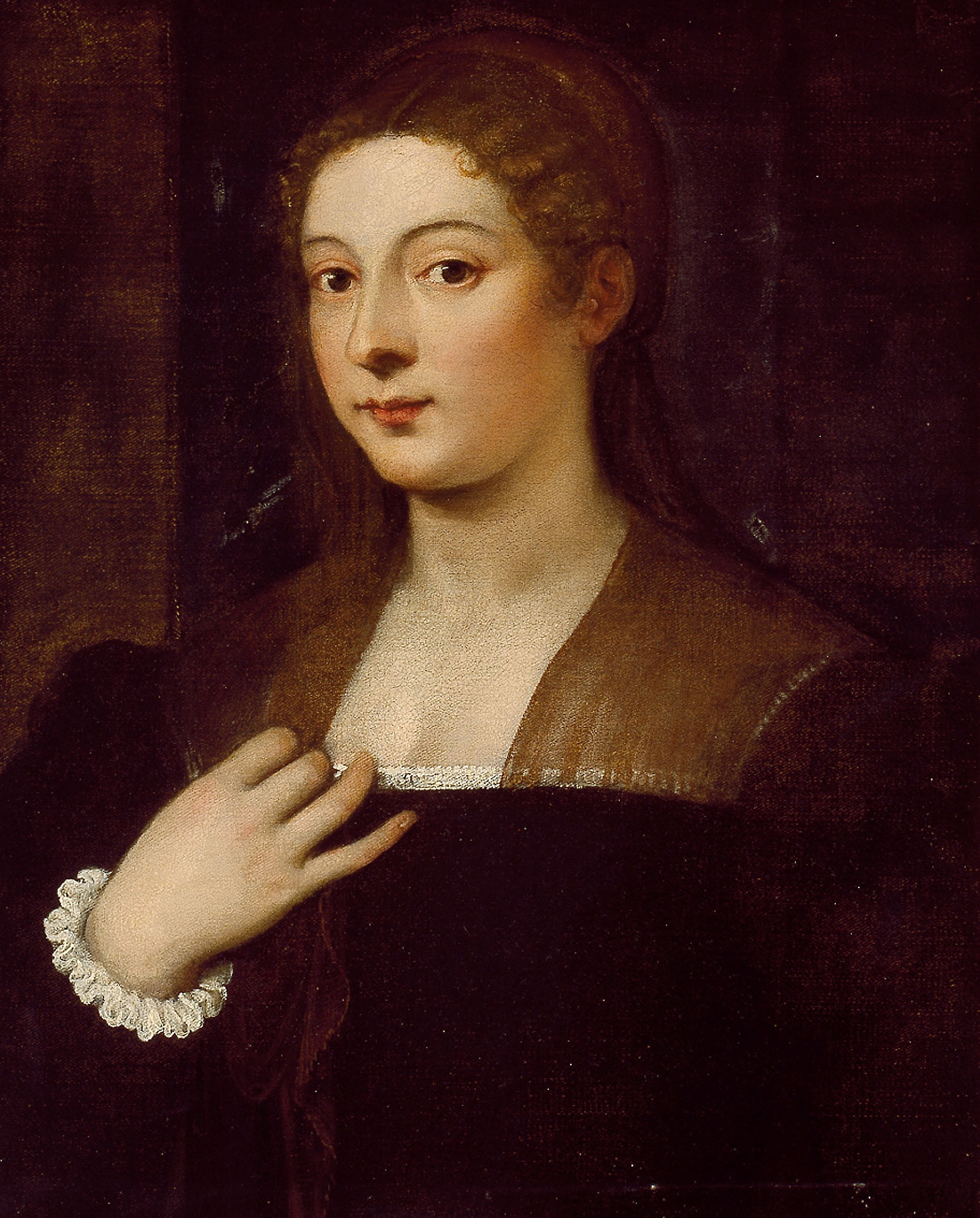
- Artist: Titian
- Year: c. 1525/1565
- Medium: Oil on canvas
- Dimensions: 63.5 cm × 51.8 cm (25.0 in × 20.4 in)
- Location: Art Institute of Chicago; Chicago
- Accession: 1954.301

Portrait of a Lady, formerly known as Portrait of Giulia Gonzaga, is an oil painting by, or possibly after Titian. It is dated, broadly, to the period 1525–1565. The painting is in the collection of the Art Institute of Chicago.

== Description ==
The attribution of this picture is uncertain, although it has long been associated with Titian. It is related to La Bella and Girl in a Fur. It has usually been entitled Portrait of Giulia Gonzaga, but the identification with the Italian noblewoman of that name is no longer accepted; it is now entitled simply Portrait of a Lady.

== Condition ==
The painting is in poor condition, and was cleaned of earlier inpainting in the 1960s. Some paint and ground has been lost in the upper background and in the sitter's hair. The surface of the paint is abraded in places in the background, on the left side of the sitter's face, and on her bosom.

== Provenance ==
- Private Collection, Italy.
- Sold by Böhler and Steinmeyer, New York, to Max Epstein (died 1954), Chicago, between 1928 and 1930.
- Bequeathed to the Art Institute of Chicago, 1954.

== Versions ==
There is one other version, identified as a portrait of Giulia Gonzaga, in a private collection in Italy. A copy of the Chicago portrait is in the Museo Cerralbo in Madrid.

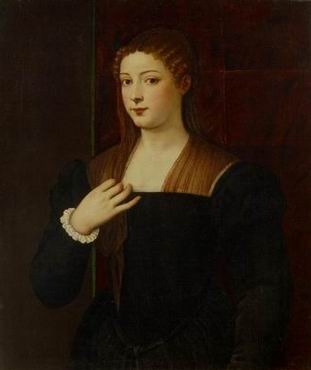
Version in a private collection, c. 1530–1539 (92 x 81 cm)

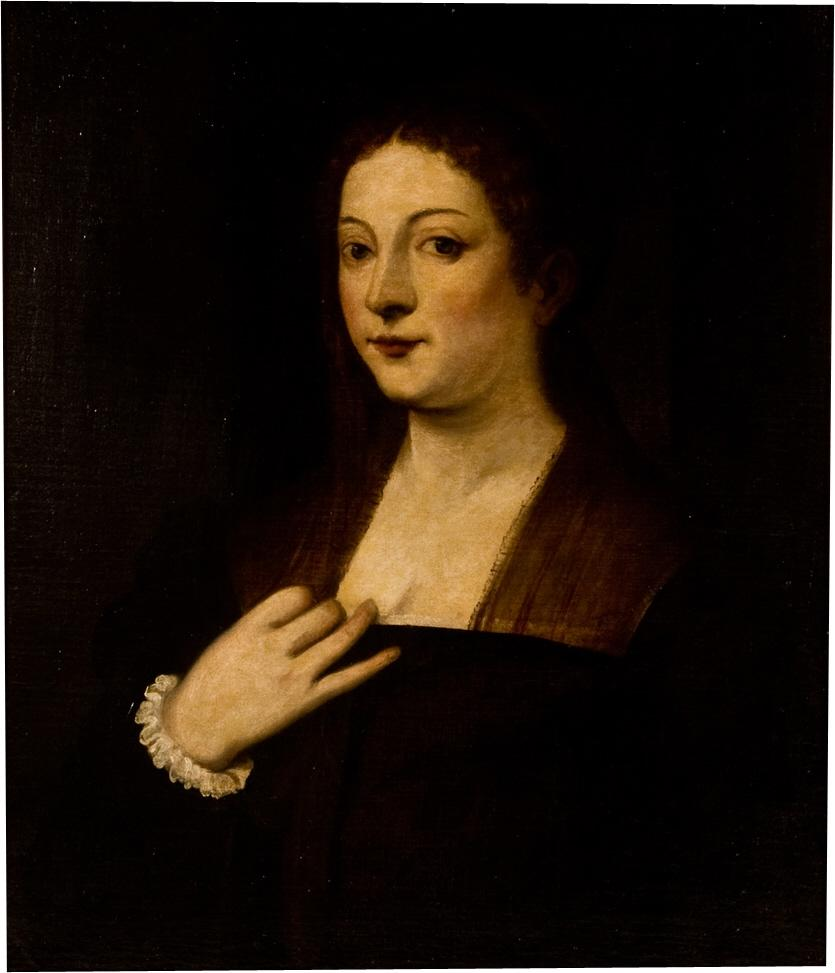
Copy in the Museo Cerralbo, c. 1576–1600 (67 x 56.5 cm)

== See also ==
- List of works by Titian

== Sources ==
- Berenson, Bernard (1957). Italian Pictures of the Renaissance: Venetian School. Vol. 1. London: Phaidon Press. p. 184.
- Lloyd, Christopher (1993). Italian Paintings before 1600 in the Art Institute of Chicago: A Catalogue of the Collection. Chicago. pp. 246–248, ill.
- Wethey, Harold E. (1971). The Paintings of Titian: Complete Edition. Vol. 2: The Portraits. London: Phaidon Press. p. 169, no. X-60.
- Paintings in the Art Institute of Chicago: A Catalogue of the Picture Collection. Chicago, 1961. p. 451.
- The Art News, 28(18). New York. 1 February 1930. p. 3, ill.
- "Portrait of a Lady". The Art Institute of Chicago. Retrieved 25 October 2022.
- "Sabbioneta celebra la bellezza, nel segno di Giulia Gonzaga". Oglio Po News. 23 August 2013. Retrieved 25 October 2022.
- "VH 0473". Museo Cerralbo. Retrieved 25 October 2022.
