= Portrait of Count Antonio Porcia and Brugnera =

Painting by Titian

Count Antonio Porcia and Brugnera
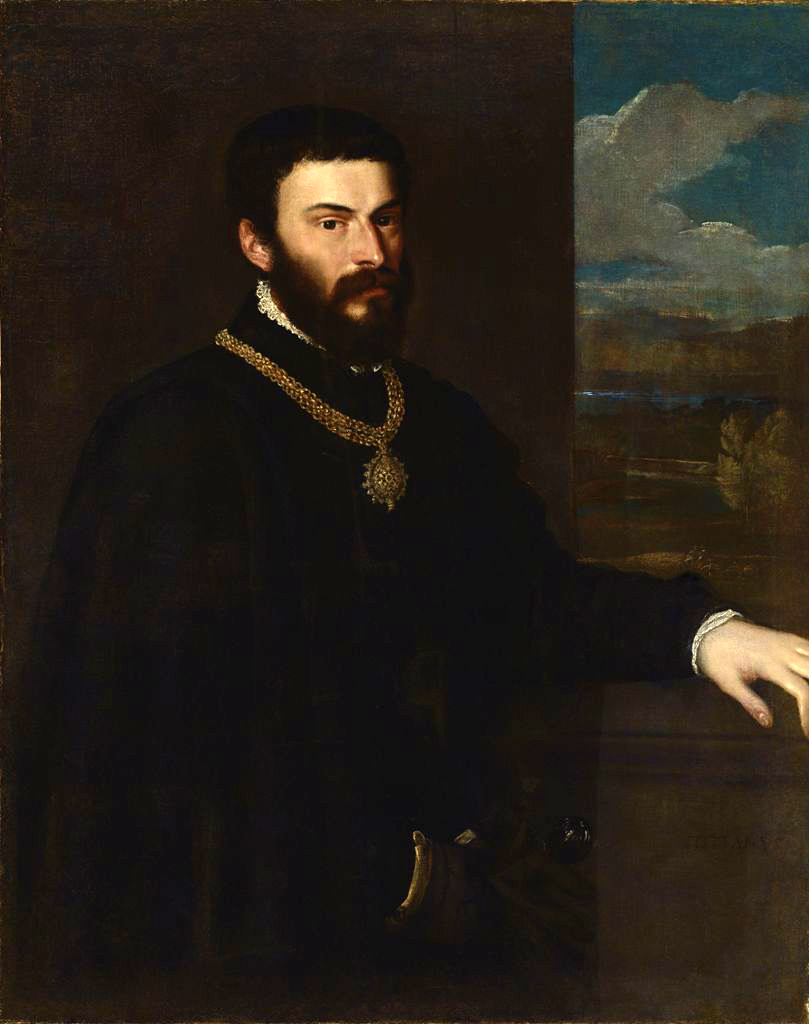
- Artist: Titian
- Year: c. 1535–1540
- Medium: Oil on canvas
- Dimensions: 115 cm × 93 cm (45 in × 37 in)
- Location: Pinacoteca di Brera, Milan
- Accession: 5958

Portrait of Count Antonio Porcia and Brugnera (Italian: Ritratto del conte Antonio di Porcia e Brugnera) is an oil painting by Titian, dated to c. 1535-1540. It hangs in the Pinacoteca di Brera, in Milan.

== Description ==
The portrait depicts a half-length figure in black, with his face turned forwards, and an energetic head in repose; across the breast is a broad gold chain with an ornament hanging from it; in the somewhat sombre lower portion of the picture there is the shining knob of the sword and the spot of white in the cuff. His aristocratic left-hand rests idly on the balustrade. In the far distance, a last gleam of light still illumines for a moment a broad fall of water. The work is signed "Titianus" on the window ledge.

== Date ==
According to Georg Gronau, the style of the painting has so much similarlity with works of c. 1540-1543, that it must be assigned to that date. The Brera however dates it slightly earlier, between 1535 and 1540.

== Provenance ==
- Formerly in Castle Porcia, near Pordenone.
- Presented to the Brera Art Gallery in 1892 by Eugenia Attendolo Bolognini, the Duchess Litta Visconti Arese, stepdaughter of Prince Alfonso Serafino of Porcia (descendant and heir of Count Antonio).

== See also ==
- List of works by Titian

== Sources ==
- Gronau, Georg (1904). Titian. London: Duckworth and Co; New York: Charles Scribner's Sons. pp. 130–131, 293.
- Ricketts, Charles (1910). Titian. London: Methuen & Co. Ltd. p. 183, plate xcvi.
- "Portrait of Count Antonio Porcia and Brugnera". Pinacoteca di Brera. Retrieved 10 March 2023.
