= Flight into Egypt (Titian) =

Painting by Titian

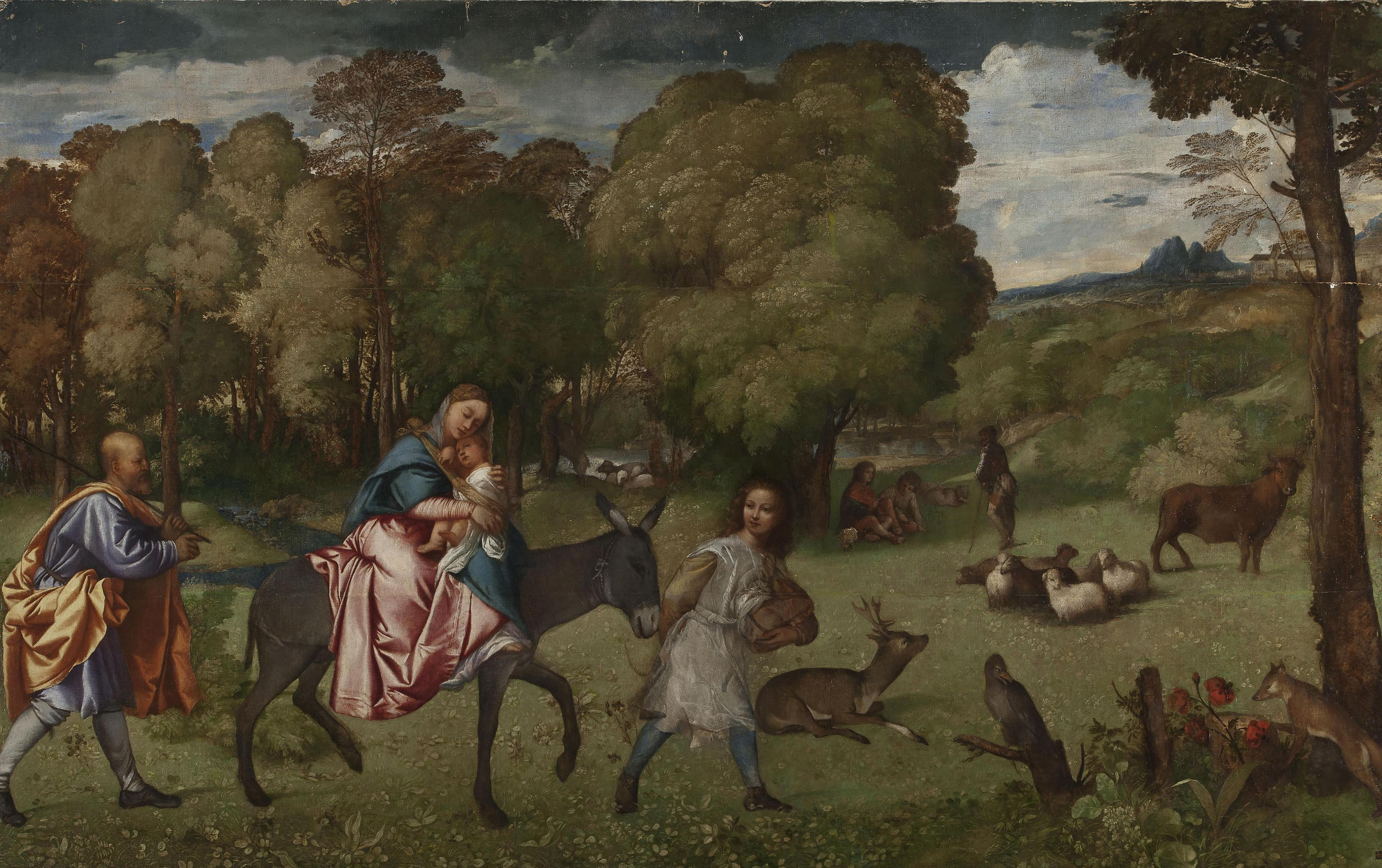
- Artist: Titian
- Year: c. 1508–1509
- Medium: Oil on canvas
- Dimensions: 206 cm × 336 cm (81 in × 132 in)
- Location: Hermitage Museum; Saint Petersburg
- Accession: ГЭ-245

The Flight into Egypt is an oil painting usually attributed to the Venetian Renaissance master Titian. This very early work by Titian was made in about 1508 or 1509. The painting is in the collection of the Hermitage Museum in Saint Petersburg, Russia. A religious landscape painting, its "bold brushwork and exhilarating use of color" have led to it being described as one of Titian's masterpieces, as well as one of his earliest. Though some scholars dispute the attribution of the painting to Titian, it is usually accepted as one of his works from the beginning of his career.

== Subject ==
Flight into Egypt depicts the biblical voyage of the newborn Jesus, along with Mary and Joseph as described in the Gospel of Matthew. The Gospel describes the Holy Family fleeing as the result of a vision from an angel, who told Joseph to bring them to Egypt since King Herod would be coming to kill the baby Jesus. The painting thus takes on a dual role. It is simultaneously a religious painting, depicting the Holy Family's journey, and a landscape painting, using the Flight as the subject for a classic pastoral scene. Titian would later revisit the subject of the Flight into Egypt in his later work Rest on the Flight into Egypt around 1512. That later painting, roughly 10 feet by 5 feet, appears consistent with the earlier work, in that both Mary and Joseph wear the same clothing as they do in Flight into Egypt, and they physically appear the same, suggesting the possibility that Titian used the same models for both paintings.

== The Painting ==
Flight into Egypt is painted on a relatively large canvas, measured at around 11 feet by 7.5 feet. The painting itself is defined by its diverse use of color, albeit muted tones. Green in particular dominates the canvas, helping to set the stage for the painting's classification as a pastoral landscape. Although landscapes were not particularly popular subjects for artists during the Renaissance, especially in Italian painting, Titian uses the setting of the Holy Family's flight to illustrate an idealized landscape. In addition to the depiction of the donkey being ridden by Mary and the baby Jesus, other animals are depicted in the landscape, including deer and an ox. Also in the background is the depiction of a shepherd tending to his flock, serving to solidify Flight into Egypt partially as a pastoral painting, while also possibly functioning symbolically as a reference to the traditional view of Jesus in Christianity as the "good shepherd".

Generally speaking, however, Flight into Egypt is primarily a religious history painting, depicting one of the earliest events in the life of Jesus described in the Gospels. Continuing during the time of the Renaissance, religious paintings depicting Christian imagery and biblical events remained the most prestigious genre of painting in Europe, contributing to the process of active faith among members of the Catholic Church. Flight into Egypt embraces the religious painting genre by utilizing the thematic trope of the Madonna and Christ Child, one of the most popular subjects of the genre, especially during the Renaissance. Although the members of Holy Family, the main subjects of the painting, are not directly centered in the canvas, their representation is framed around this central image of Mary and Jesus, with Mary, regarded as the greatest saint within Catholicism, caring for the infant Jesus on the family's journey to safety in Egypt.

== See also ==
- List of works by Titian
- Flight into Egypt

== Sources ==
- "Flight into Egypt". The State Hermitage Museum. Retrieved 27 October 2022.
