= Detroit Trio =

c. 1500 painting attributed to Giorgione, Titian and Sebastiano del Piombo

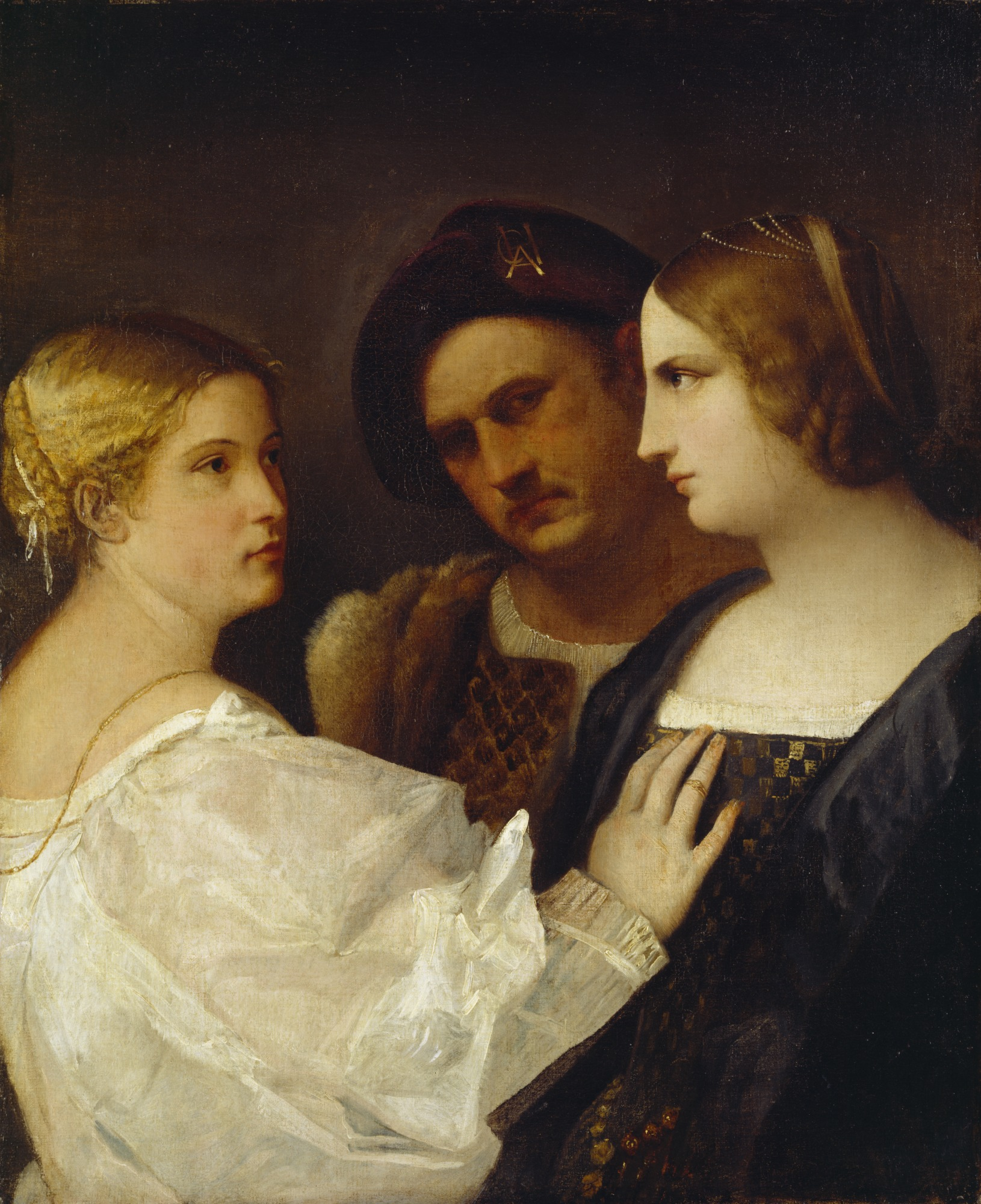
Detroit Trio (c. 1500), 84.5 cm x 69.2 cm (33.3 in x 27.2 in)

Detroit Trio, also titled The Appeal, is an oil on canvas painting attributed to Giorgione, Titian and Sebastiano del Piombo, executed c. 1500. It is held now in the Detroit Institute of Arts.

== Analysis ==
The letters ACH on the man's beret are variously interpreted as "Amor, Concordia e Honor" or "Amor, Charitas e Humanitas", whilst others argue the figures show Jason between Medea and Creusa.

The inscription "Fra Sebastiano del Piombo, Giorzon, Tizian" on the reverse suggests that all three artists worked on the work, possibly with Giorgione beginning it and his two studio assistants del Piombo and Titian completing it after his death in 1510. However, other art historians argue it is a fake produced in the 16th century or later, whilst others argue it was by Giovanni Cariani or Palma il Vecchio.

== Copies ==
Several copies of the work survive, including a very faithful 17th century one in Venice's gallerie dell'Accademia.

== See also ==
- List of works by Titian
