= The Crowning with Thorns (Titian, Munich) =

1576 painting by Titian

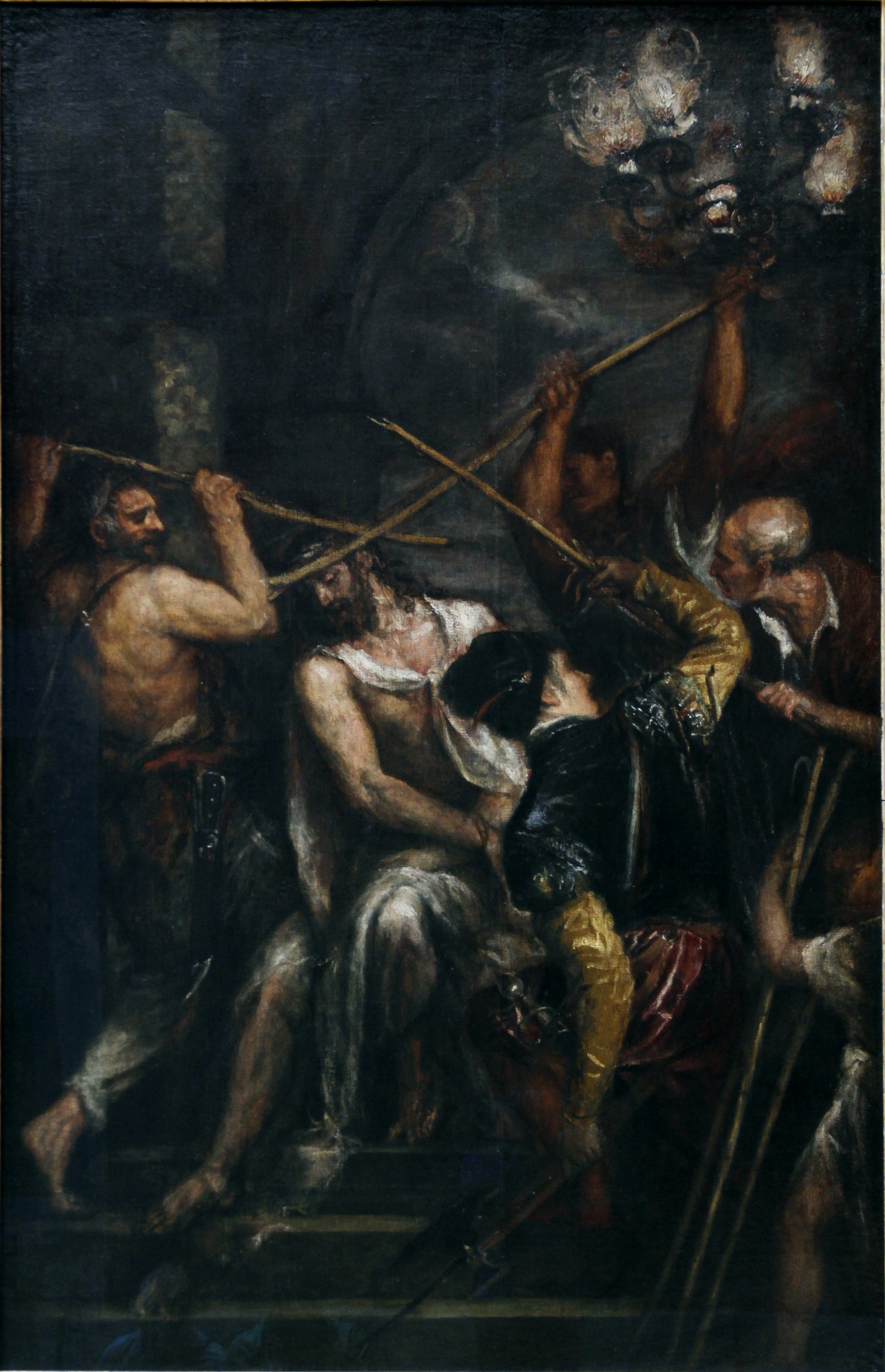
- Artist: Titian
- Year: 1570
- Medium: Oil on canvas
- Dimensions: 280 cm × 182 cm (110 in × 72 in)
- Location: Alte Pinakothek; Munich

The Crowning with Thorns or Christ Crowned with Thorns is an oil on canvas painting by Titian, executed in 1570, now in the Alte Pinakothek in Munich. It is a typical composition from his final period. and can be compared with an earlier 1542 work of his on the same subject.

== See also ==
- List of works by Titian
