= Portrait of Clarissa Strozzi =

1542 painting by Titian

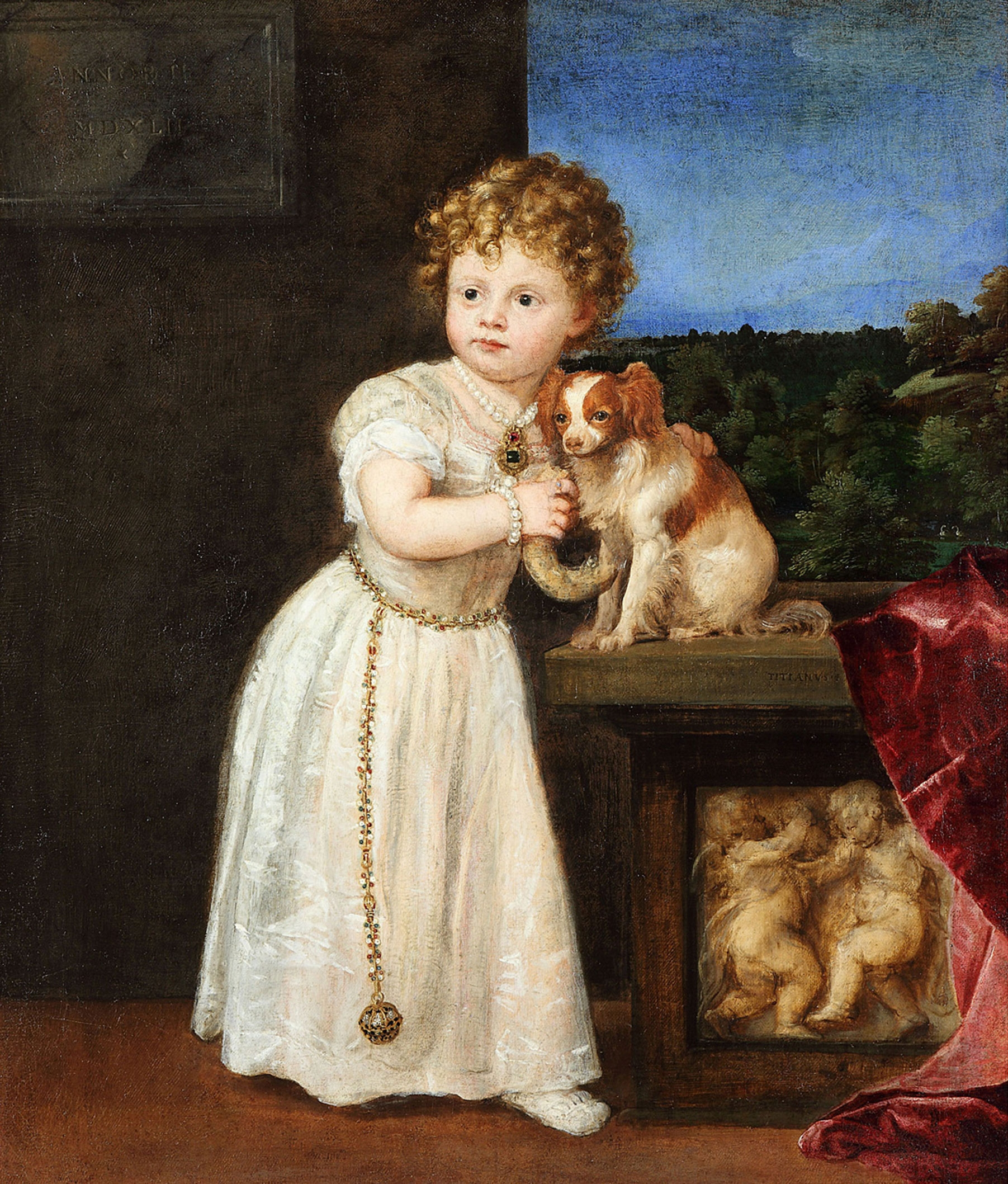
- Artist: Titian
- Year: 1542
- Medium: Oil on canvas
- Dimensions: 115 cm × 98 cm (45 in × 39 in)
- Location: Gemäldegalerie; Berlin

Portrait of Clarissa Strozzi is an oil on canvas portrait by the Italian painter Titian, from 1542. It is held at the Gemäldegalerie, in Berlin.

The painting depicts a girl from the old Florentine family of Strozzi. The girl seems slightly frightened and holds onto her little Phalene dog. By some it is considered an example of one of the most beautiful child portraits in the world thanks to colouring and specifically the combination of colours carmine red, blue and golden yellow. This canvas is considered an inspiration for similar paintings by Anthony van Dyck.

== See also ==
- List of works by Titian

== Bibliography ==
- R. Bergerhoff, Tycjan, Warszawa: Arkady, 1979. HPS, 2007, ISBN 978-83-60688-47-2.
- W. Mole, Tycjan, Warszawa: Arkady, 1958
