= Mars, Venus and Amor =

Painting by Titian

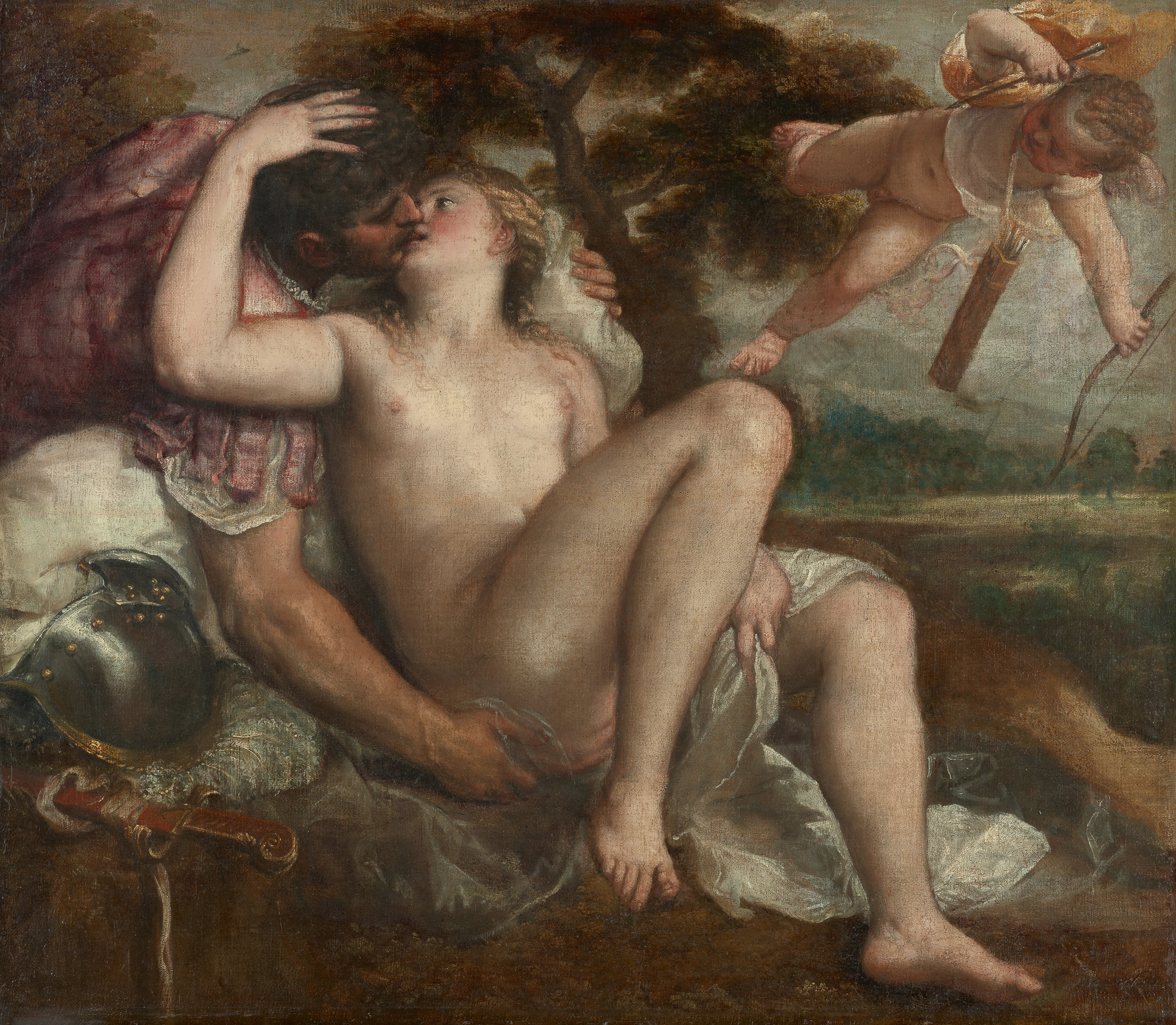
- Artist: Titian
- Year: c. 1550
- Medium: Oil on canvas
- Dimensions: 97 cm × 109 cm (38 in × 43 in)
- Location: Kunsthistorisches Museum; Vienna
- Accession: GG_13

Mars, Venus and Amor is an oil on canvas painting by Titian dated after 1570. It has been in the collection of the Kunsthistorisches Museum in Vienna since at least 1783. The painting depicts the adulterous love of Venus and Mars from the Graeco-Roman mythology.

== Painting ==
The painting measures 97 × 109 centimeters and is set in a frame measuring 111.5 × 130 × 8 centimeters.

Venus reclines nude on a small hill, her upper body propped on a white pillow. A white cloth partially covers her left thigh, held by her left hand between her legs. Her left leg is extended, right bent, feet on the ground. Her left arm stretches across her body, while her right hand clasps Mars’s hair as she turns toward him. Mars, seen from the waist up behind the pillow, wears a red breastplate. His right hand rests under Venus’s hips, left hand grips the pillow. His helmet and sheathed sword lie near the bottom left.

Cupid appears in the upper right portion of the painting, hovering in the air and facing the couple. His right arm is bent, holding an arrow in his right hand, while his extended left arm holds a bow. He wears a light-colored shirt, is nude from the waist down, and carries a quiver slung over his right shoulder. In the background stretches a Mediterranean landscape with a nearby tree, additional trees in the distance, grassy meadows, and rolling hills on the horizon.

== Background ==
The painting is a variation of the "Venus and Mars" motif. The mythological background stems from their love affair, in which Venus betrays her husband, Vulcan. According to Homer’s Odyssey, the couple is caught in the act by Hephaestus (Vulcan), who ensnares them in a net.

The work is attributed to Titian’s late period, after 1570. Art historian Ekkehard Mai notes that the composition is typical of this phase, characterized by dramatic and expressive portrayals of lovers. He draws parallels to Titian’s earlier works such as Danaë (1550s) and Venus and Adonis (c. 1553), which also feature nude female figures in the foreground and dynamic, emotionally charged interactions. This "typical Titianesque amorous poetry" is therefore considered to have developed after the 1550s.

== See also ==
- List of works by Titian

== Sources ==
- Mai, Ekkehard (2000). "Venus, Mars und Amor". In Mai, Ekkehard (ed.). Faszination Venus. Bilder einer Göttin von Cranach bis Cabanel. Gent: Snoek-Ducaju and Zoon. pp. 322–323.
- "Mars, Venus und Amor". Kunsthistorischen Museum Wien. Retrieved 25 October 2022.
