= Portrait of Pope Sixtus IV =

c. 1540 painting by Titian

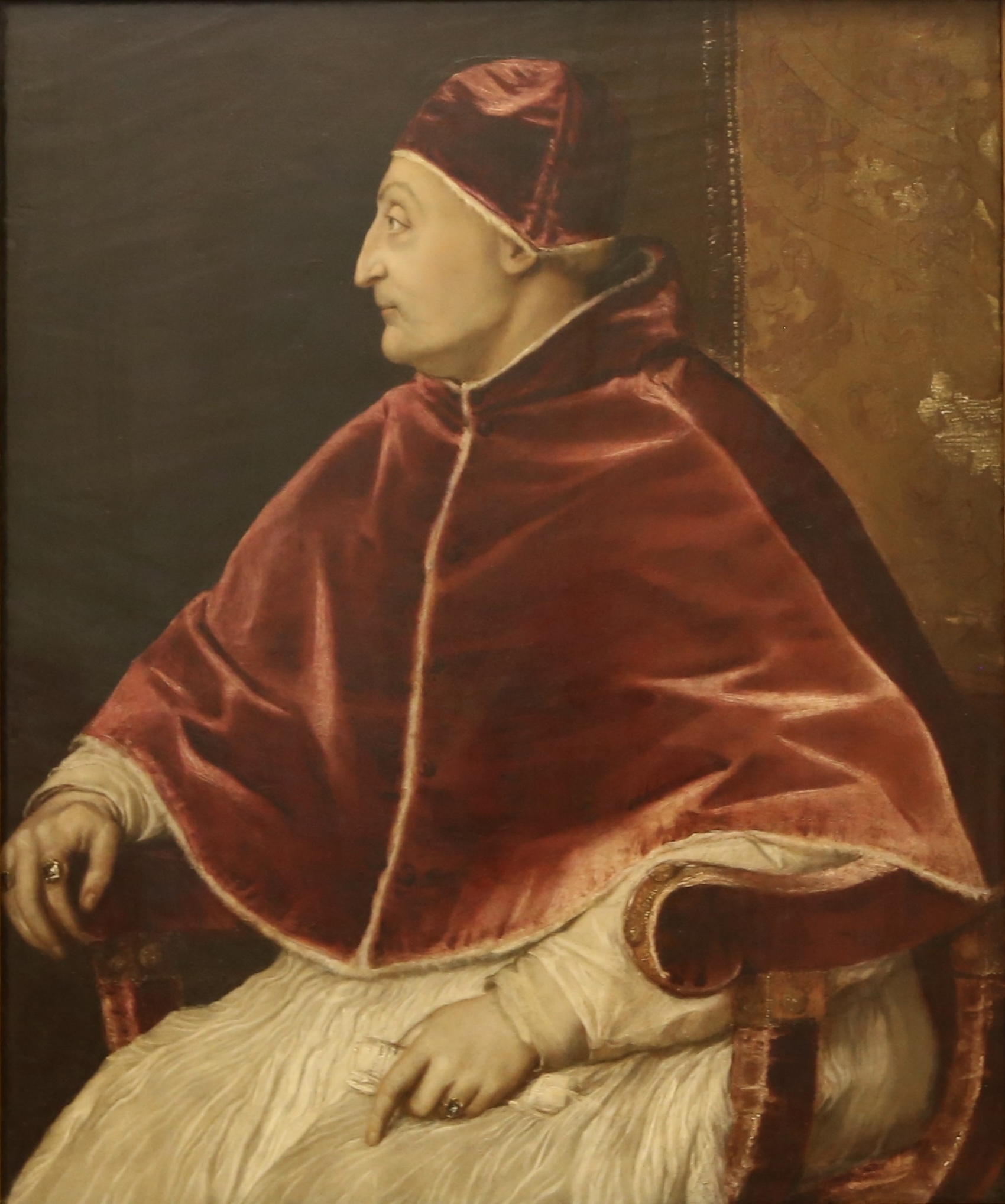
Portrait of Pope Sixtus IV, c. 1540; oil on panel (109.5 x 87 cm)

Portrait of Pope Sixtus IV is an oil on panel portrait of Pope Sixtus IV by Titian and his studio, from c. 1540. It is held in the Uffizi, in Florence.

== Provenance ==
The painting was recorded as being at the Ducal Palace of Urbino in 1568, before moving to Florence in 1631 as part of the dowry of Vittoria Della Rovere on her marriage to Ferdinand II, Grand Duke of Tuscany. It was moved to the Palazzo Pitti in 1694 as one of the works owned by Francesco Maria de' Medici. It finally came to the Uffizi in 1897. In June 1940, the painting and other works from the Uffizi were moved to a wartime refuge at the Villa medicea di Poggio a Caiano. Between 1944 and 1951 it returned to the Palazzo Pitti, followed by a long period in the Uffizi's stores. It was re-exhibited at the Uffizi since 1972.
