= Saint Jerome in Penitence (Titian, 1552) =

C. 1556–61 painting by Titian

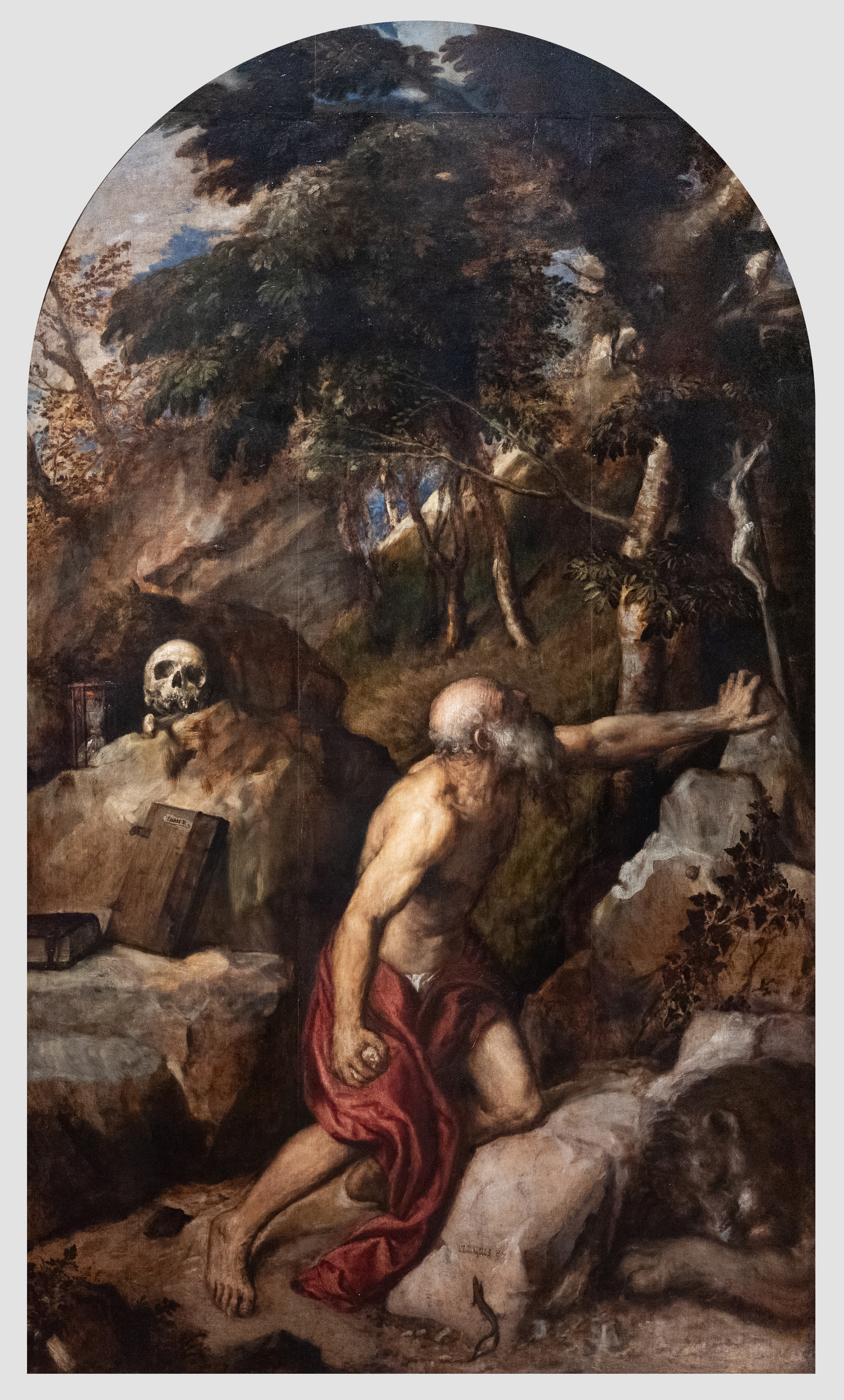
- Artist: Titian
- Year: c. 1556–1561
- Medium: Oil on canvas
- Dimensions: 235 cm × 125 cm (93 in × 49 in)
- Location: Pinacoteca di Brera; Milan

Saint Jerome in Penitence is an oil on canvas c. 1556–1561 painting by Titian. It is held in the Pinacoteca di Brera, in Milan. It depicts Saint Jerome while doing penitence in the wilderness. He looks at the crucifix, at the left, while holding a rock on his hand, that he used to mortify himself. At the right bottom is the tamed lion.

== See also ==
- List of works by Titian
