= Woman Holding an Apple =

Painting by Titian

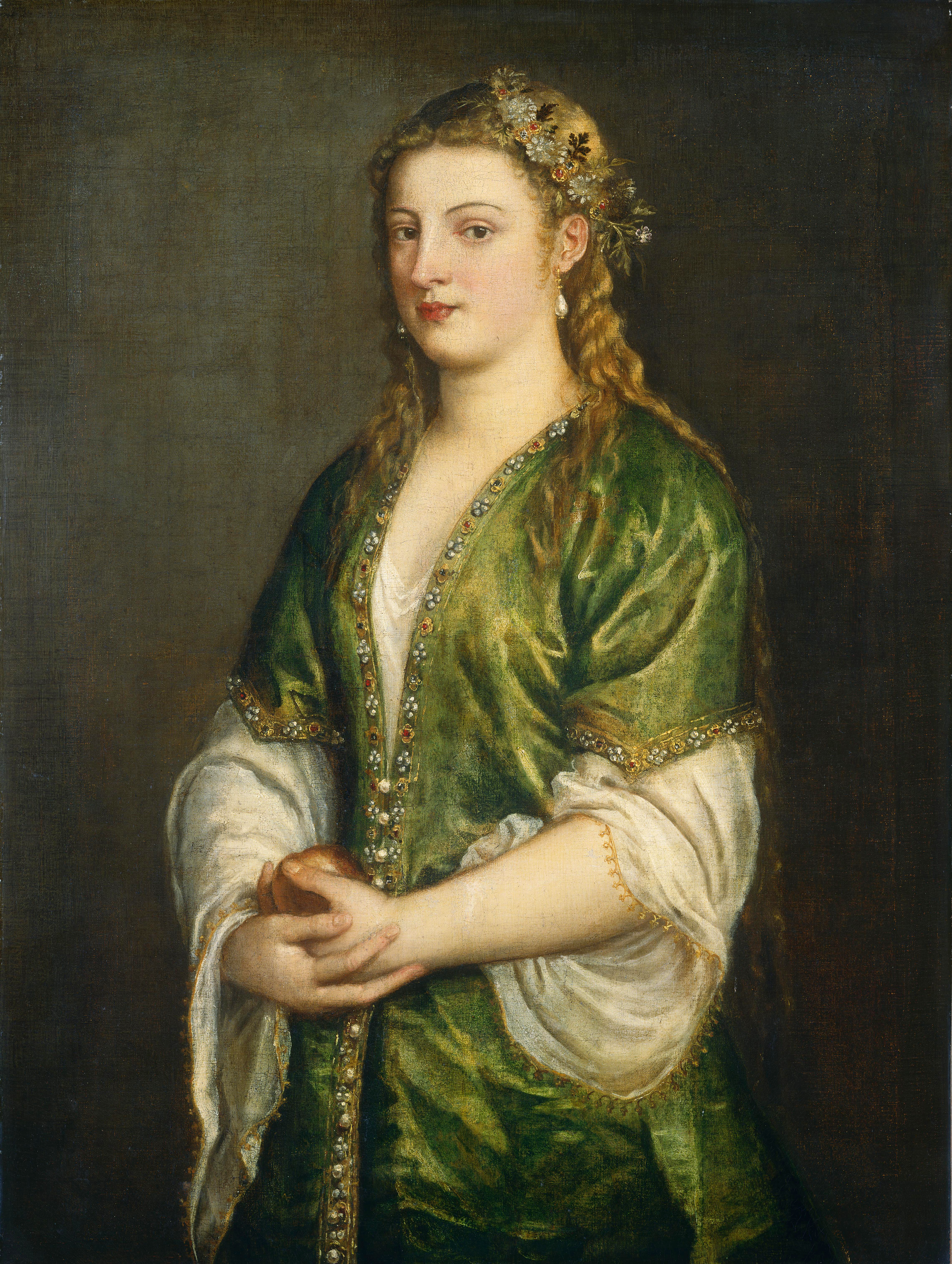
- Artist: Titian
- Year: c. 1550–1555
- Medium: oil on canvas
- Dimensions: 97.8 cm × 73.8 cm (38.5 in × 29.1 in)
- Location: National Gallery of Art, Washington, D.C.
- Accession: 1939.1.292

Woman Holding an Apple, also known as Portrait of a Lady, is an oil on canvas painting by Titian, made c. 1550-1555. It hangs in the National Gallery of Art, in Washington, D.C.

== Description ==
The subject stands at three-quarter length, turned to the left, looking at the spectator. She has long blonde hair and fair skin, and holds an apple in her hands. She wears a green robe, with jewelled border, over a white dress with long sleeves and gold border.

== Analysis ==
In 1940, it was published in The Art News as "Portrait of a Lady in Green, presumably Giulia di Gonzaga-Colonna, Duchess of Traeetto". In 1941, Duveen Brothers titled it "Portrait of Giulia di Gonzaga-Colonna [Presumed]". The tentative identification with the Italian noblewoman of that name is not accepted today, and cannot be sustained with any historical source. Indeed, it may not represent a particular woman in the traditional sense of portraiture, but rather an idealised form of female beauty. The model may be Lavinia, Titian's daughter, who is known to have posed for several of his pictures.

== Sources ==
- Duveen Brothers (1941). Duveen Pictures in Public Collections of America. New York: William Bradford Press. pp. 1953–1954, nos. 155–157.
- Frankfurter, Alfred M. (16 March 1940). "Great Renaissance Portraits: A Unique Exhibition of Twenty-five Italian Masterpieces". The Art News, 38(24): pp. 7–9, 21.
- Morassi, Antonio (1967). "Titian". In Encyclopedia of World Art. Vol. 14. London: McGraw-Hill Publishing Company Limited. col. 146.
- "403. Portrait of a Lady (Giulia di Gonzaga-Colonna ?)". Preliminary Catalogue of Paintings and Sculpture. Washington, D.C.: National Gallery of Art, 1941. pp. 197–198, no. 403.
- "Portrait of a Lady". Paintings and Sculpture from the Kress Collection. Washington, D.C.: National Gallery of Art, 1945. p. 125.
- "Woman Holding an Apple, c. 1550". National Gallery of Art. Retrieved 26 October 2022.
