= Supper at Emmaus (Titian) =

Paintings by Titian

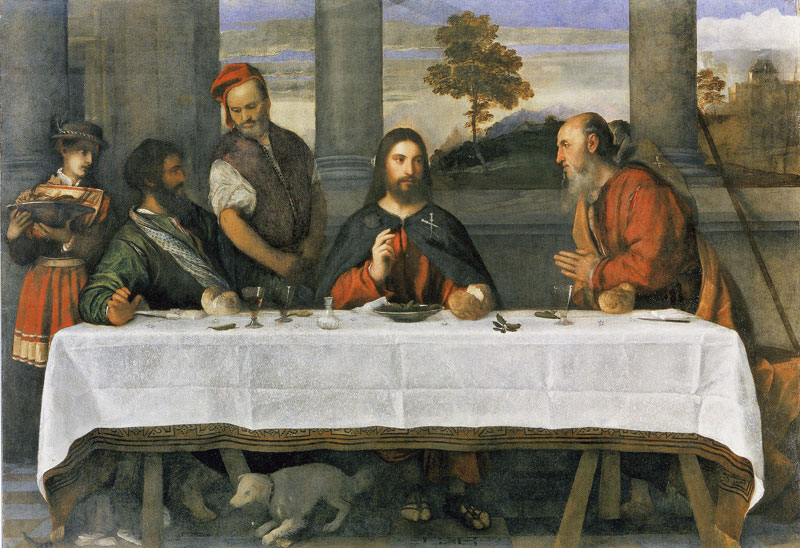
Supper at Emmaus, 169 x 211 cm, c. 1534 (Walker Art Gallery, L 914)

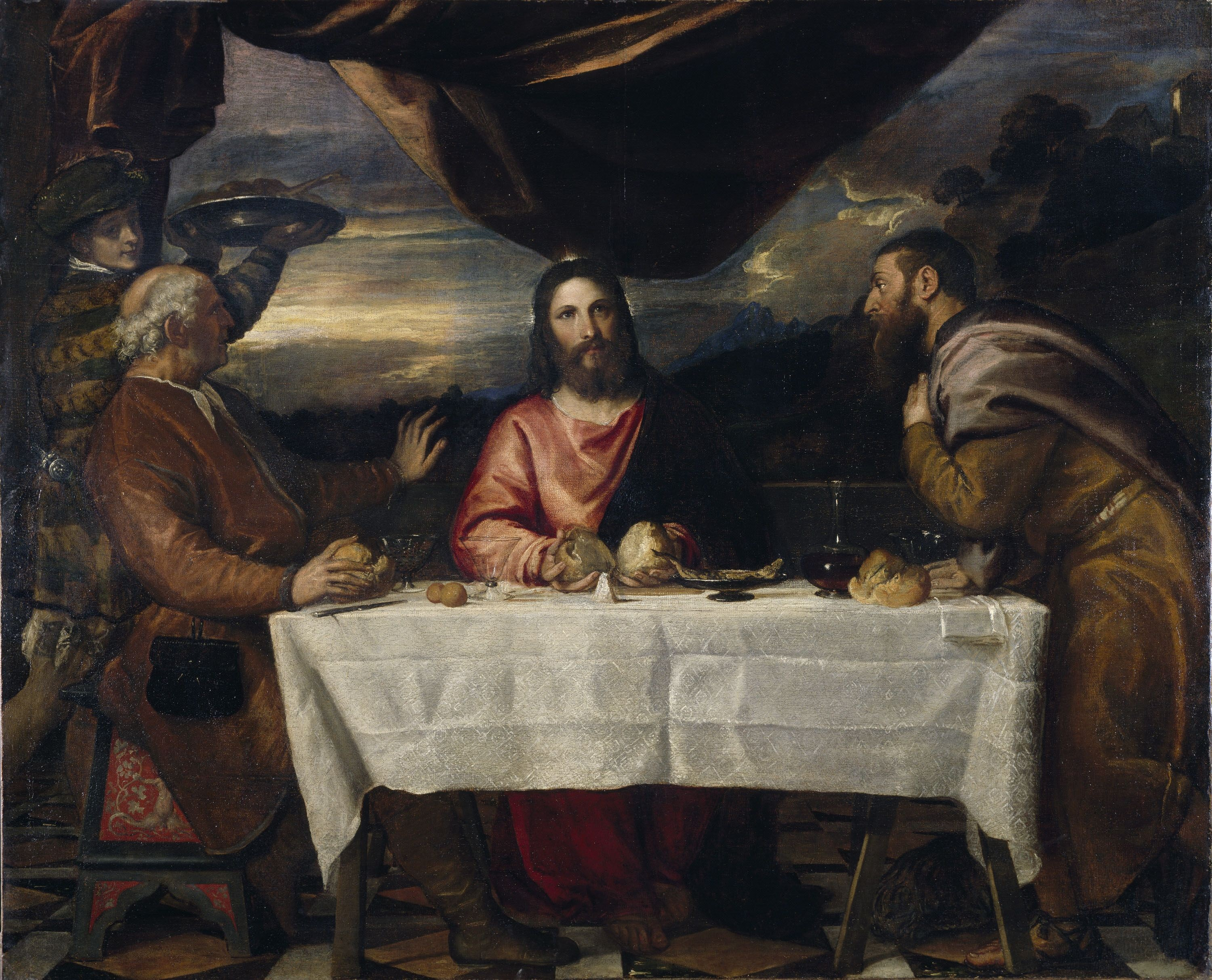
Supper at Emmaus, 163 x 200 cm, c. 1545 (National Gallery of Ireland, NGI.84

The Supper at Emmaus is the title shared by several similar works by Titian, two of which are discussed here. The first, made about 1534, is currently on long-term loan to the Walker Art Gallery, in Liverpool. The second, made about 1545 by Titian and his studio, is in the National Gallery of Ireland, in Dublin.

== First version ==
Georg Gronau considers this a replica of the Pilgrims of Emmaus, in the Louvre. From the sixteenth to the eighteenth century, the picture was preserved in the Ducal Palace, Venice, and belongs now to the Earl of Yarborough. It is on long-term loan to the Walker Art Gallery in Liverpool.

== Second version ==
=== Provenance ===
- Venice;
- Abbate Celotti, 1836;
- Prince Demidoff, Villa San Donato, near Florence, 1836;
- Purchased, Paris, Prince Demidoff sale, March 1870.

== Sources ==
- Gronau, Georg (1904). Titian. London: Duckworth and Co; New York: Charles Scribner's Sons. pp. 168–169, 283.
- Ricketts, Charles (1910). Titian. London: Methuen & Co. Ltd. pp. 105, 106, 115, 117, 179.
- "The Supper at Emmaus". National Gallery of Ireland. Retrieved 18 October 2022.
- "The Supper at Emmaus". National Museums Liverpool. Retrieved 18 October 2022.
