= Sciarra Madonna =

c. 1540 painting by Titian

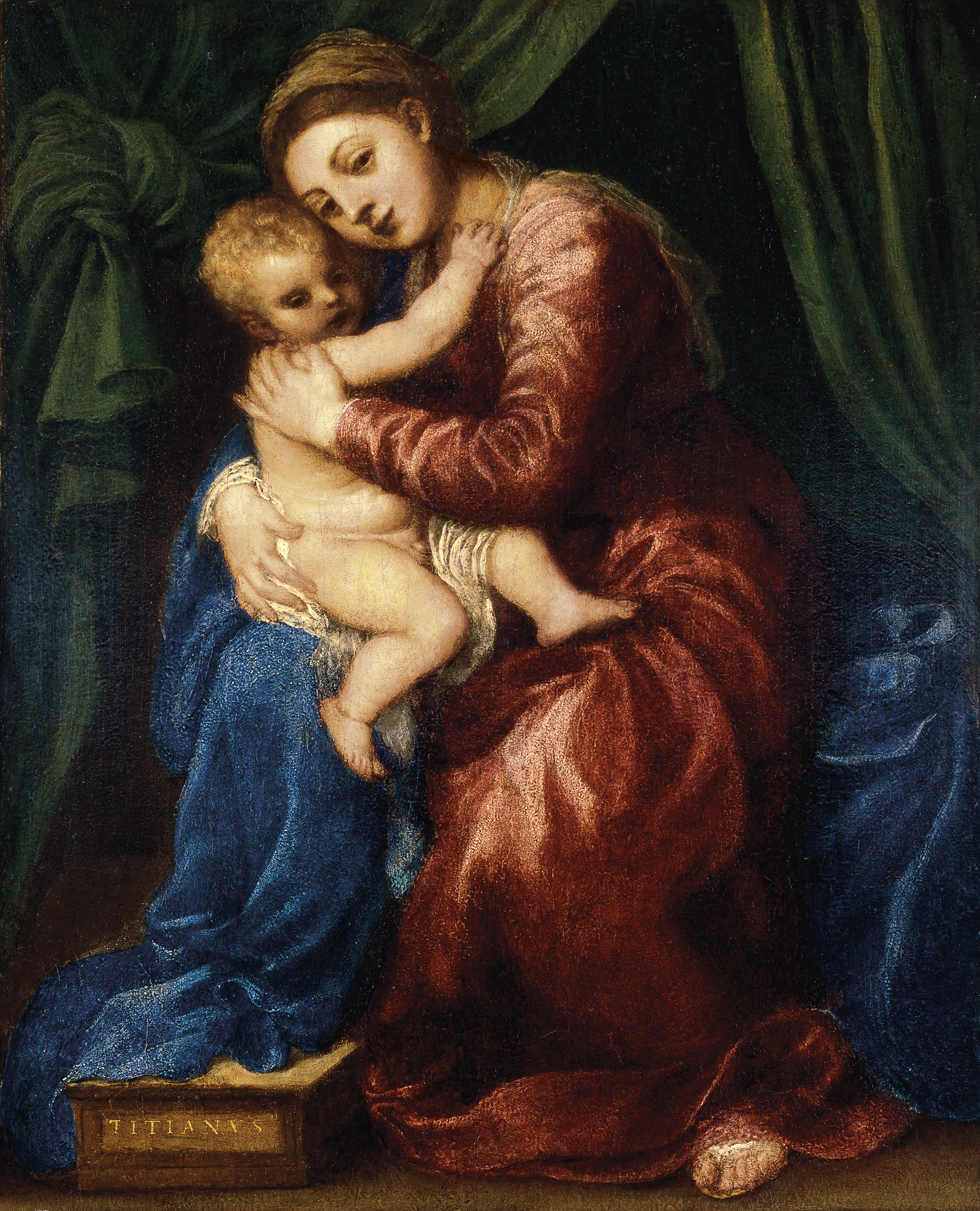
- Artist: Titian
- Year: c. 1540
- Medium: Oil on panel
- Dimensions: 281 cm × 195 cm (111 in × 77 in)
- Location: Museu Nacional d'Art de Catalunya (deposit), Barcelona

The Sciarra Madonna is an oil on panel painting attributed to Titian, signed "TITIANVS" and dated to circa 1540. It belongs to the Thyssen-Bornemisza Museum, and it is in deposit in the Museu Nacional d'Art de Catalunya, in Barcelona.

This attribution was accepted by Cavalcaselle, abandoned and then revived by William Suida, who noted how the Madonna's pose echoed that in Rest on the Flight into Egypt (Longleat House). Hans Tietze and Bernard Berenson argue it is a work by the school of Titian rather than an autograph work.

== History ==
It is first recorded in the Palazzo Sciarra in Ferrara, from which it was bought in Rome by Francis Cowper. It then passed from his descendants to the Thyssen collection.

== Sources ==
- Thyssen-Bornemisza Museum
- Francesco Valcanover, L'opera completa di Tiziano, Milan, Rizzoli, 1969.
