= The Lovers (Titian) =

Painting attributed to Titian

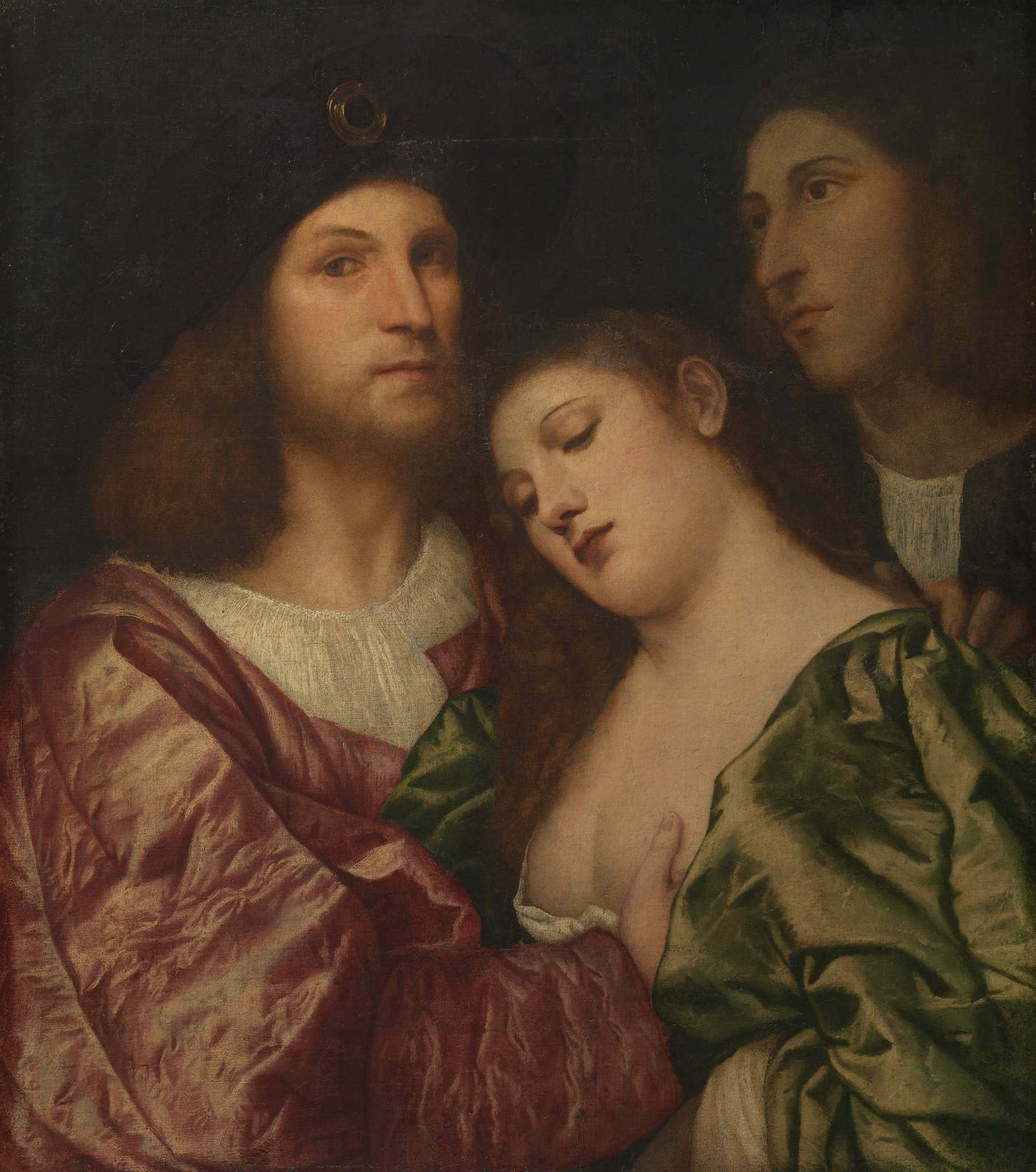
The Lovers, 74.5 x 65.2 cm (29.3 x 25.7 in)

The Lovers, also known by other titles, is an oil painting, attributed to Titian, and dated to about 1510. The picture is part of the Royal Collection of the United Kingdom (accession number RCIN 403928) and hangs in the King's Dressing Room of Windsor Castle.

== See also ==
- Allegory of Marriage

== Sources ==
- "The Lovers c. 1510". Royal Collection Trust. Accessed 25 October 2022.
