= Portrait of Vincenzo Mosti =

Painting by Titian

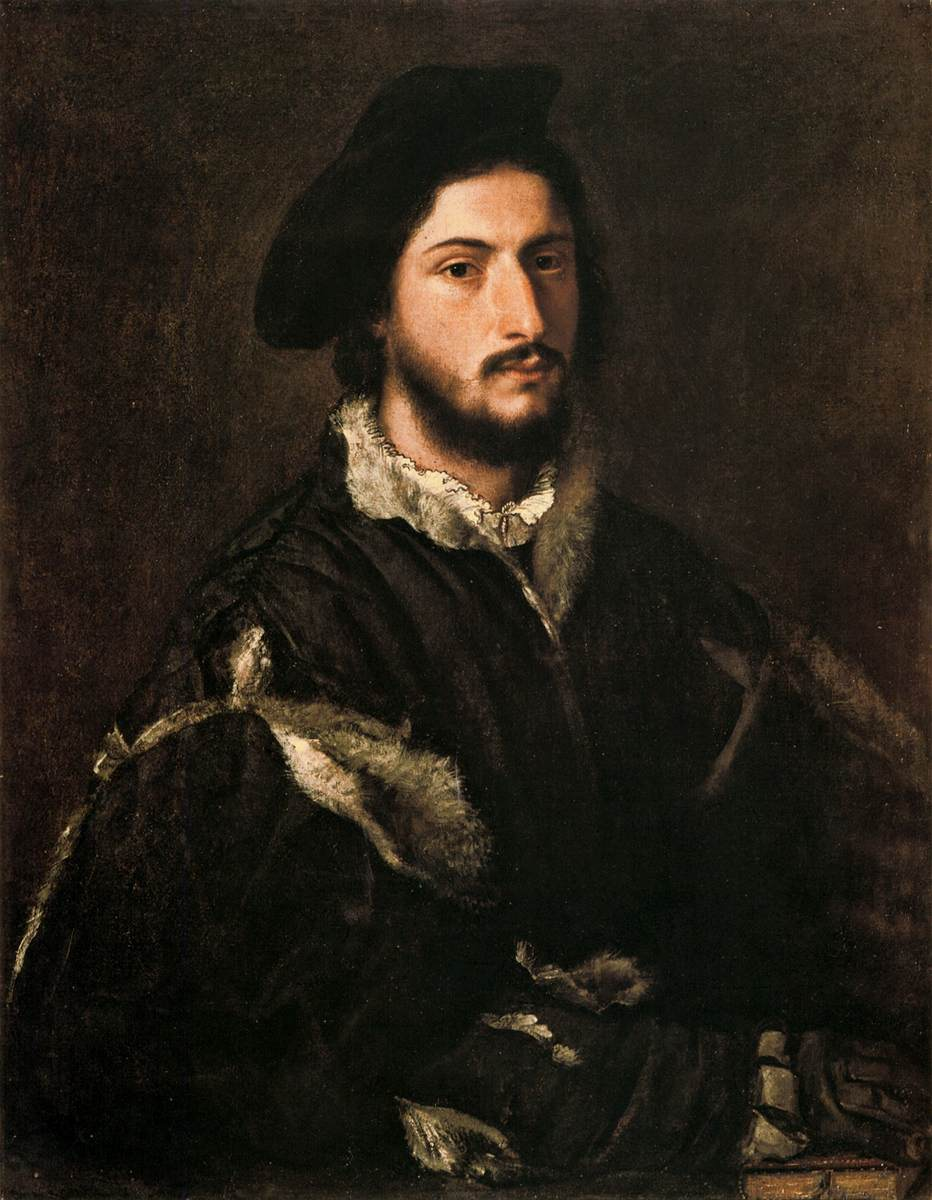
- Artist: Titian
- Year: c. 1520
- Medium: Oil on canvas
- Dimensions: 85 cm × 67 cm (33 in × 26 in)
- Location: Galleria Palatina; Florence

Portrait of Vincenzo Mosti is a painting by Titian, executed around 1520. It is housed in the Galleria Palatina, in Florence.

== History ==
This work is mentioned in the gallery's 1687 inventory as a "copy of Titian believed to be original". In that of 1815, it is attributed to the Venetian School and in that of 1829 to an unknown artist. It has been reassigned to Titian after the elimination of the repaintures.

The subject is traditionally identified as Tommaso Mosti, a member of a family connected with the Este of Ferrara, based on an inscription in the reverse which says "Di Thomaso Mosti in età di anni XXV l'anno MDXXVI. Thitiano de Cadore pittore". However, the historical Mosti followed an ecclesiastical career, and thus the garments of the subject are not appropriate. More likely, the man could be his elder brother Vincenzo, who died in 1536, or Agostino. The dating in the inscription (1526) would be an error of transcription of a "0" as a "6".

== Description ==
A half-length male figure emerges from a dark background, turned three-quarters to the right, looking at the viewer. He wears a large fur-lined jacket, a dark cap and a white shirt gathered at the neck. The fluffy sleeve is placed in the foreground through the gesture of resting the elbow on an imaginary parapet that coincides with the lower edge of the painting, on which the man, resting his gloved hand on it, holds a book, as a symbol of his culture.

The aesthetic rendering of the subject and the psychological components it conveys are particularly effective: dignity, nobility of soul, determination, intelligence. In rendering the various details, the artist used different types of brushstrokes: nuanced and delicate on the face, streaked with light on the collar of the shirt, thick and visible for the fur. The modernity of the chromatic harmonies and the elegance of the composition brings the painting closer to works such as the Man with the Glove, in the Louvre.

== See also ==
- Man with a Glove

== Bibliography ==
- Zuffi, Stefano (2008). Tiziano. Milan: Mondadori Arte. ISBN 978-88-370-6436-5.
