= The Entombment (disambiguation) =

The Entombment usually refers to the entombment, or burial, of Jesus.

The Entombment may also refer to these paintings:

- The Entombment (Bouts), a 1450s painting by Dirk Bouts
- The Entombment (Michelangelo), a 1500s unfinished painting by Michelangelo
- The Entombment (Titian, 1559)
- The Entombment of Christ (Caravaggio), a 1600s painting by Caravaggio
- The Entombment of Christ (Delacroix), an 1820 painting by Eugène Delacroix
- The Entombment of Christ (Titian), a c. 1520 painting by Titian
- Entombment of Christ (Carracci), a c.1595 painting by Annibale Carracci
- The Deposition (Raphael), or The Entombment, a 1507 painting by Raphael
- The Deposition from the Cross (Pontormo), or The Entombment, a 1528 painting by Jacopo Pontormo

== See also ==
- Tomb of Jesus
- Entombment, a method of final disposition in which a corpse is deposited in a tomb
- Entombed (disambiguation)
- Lamentation of Christ
