= Entombment of Christ (Carracci) =

Painting by Annibale Carracci

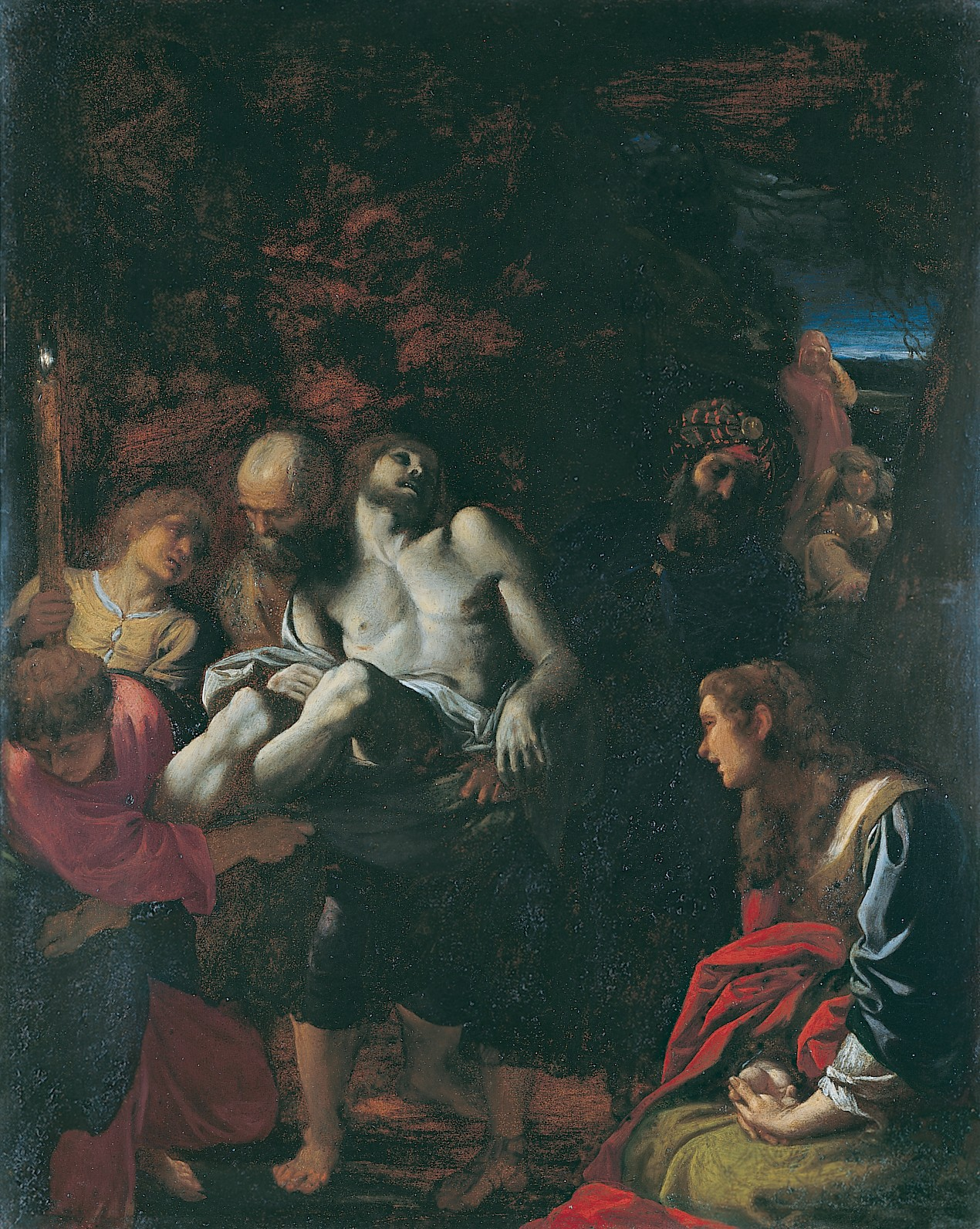
Entombment of Christ (c. 1595) by Annibale Carracci

Entombment of Christ is a c.1595 oil on copper painting by the Italian painter Annibale Carracci, now in the Metropolitan Museum of Art

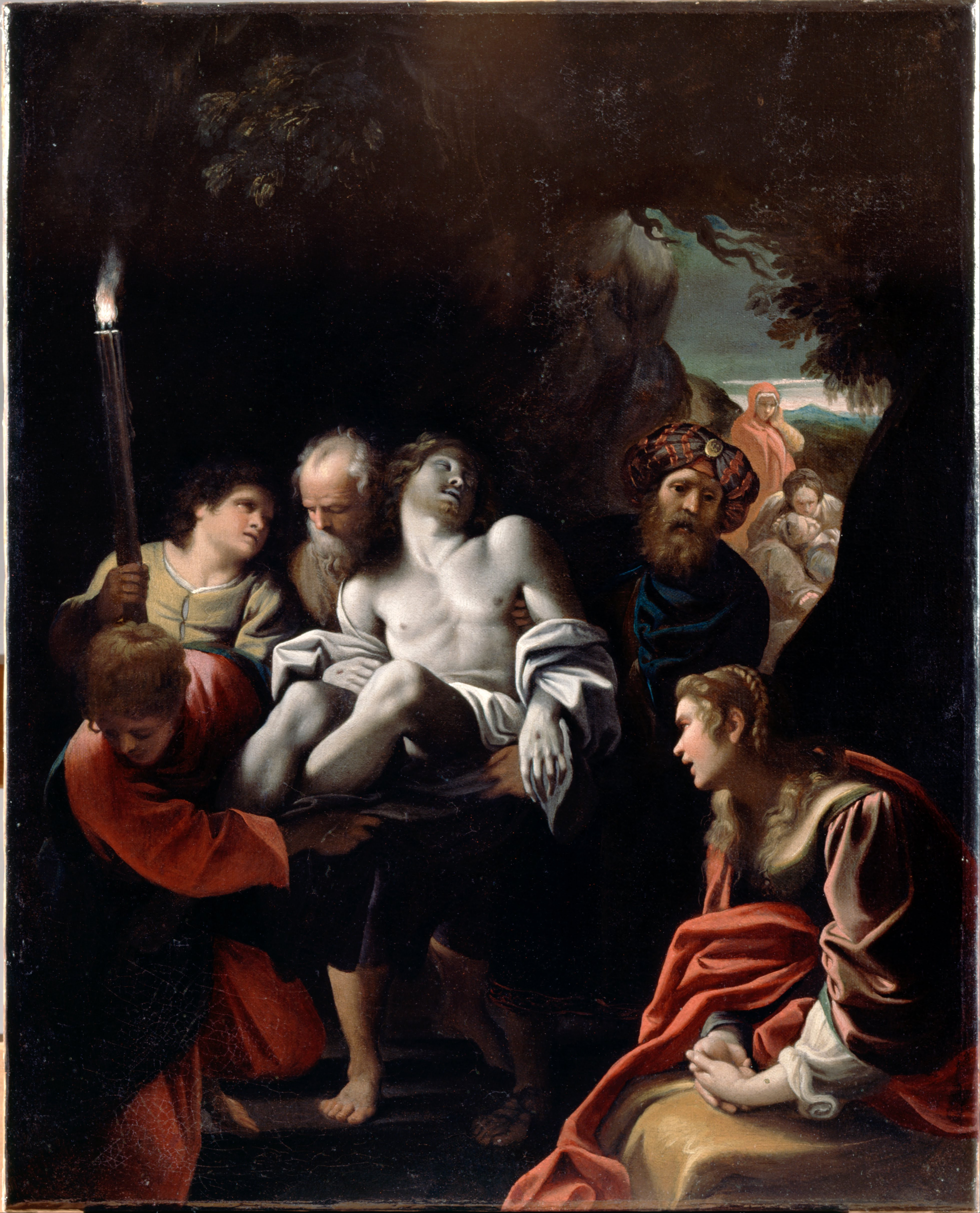
Sisto Badalocchio, Christ Carried to the Tomb, circa 1607, Dulwich Picture Gallery, London

According to Giovanni Pietro Bellori and Carlo Cesare Malvasia, Annibale Carracci's main 17th-century biographers, the painting was produced for Astorre Sampieri, an important clergyman in Bologna. Malvasia adds the details that it was a painting on copper and that Sampieri commissioned it to give to a major but unnamed figure in Rome but thought so highly of it that he kept the original for itself and instead gave the figure a (now lost) copy made by Carracci's then pupil Guido Reni. It is usually dated to around 1595, the year in which Annibale, his cousin Ludovico and his brother Agostino completed the Palazzo Sampieri frescoes for Sampieri, complemented by Annibale's own Christ and the Samaritan Woman.

Several copies of the work survive, particularly by Sisto Badalocchio, leading scholars to theorise that there must be a lost original of the composition by Carracci himself. The work reappeared on the art market and was acquired by the Metropolitan Museum in 1998 as another Badalocchio copy, only later being reattributed to Carracci himself.

== Description and style ==
Carracci's small copper work is notable first of all for the remarkable lighting effects that pervade it: the body of Christ is led into a dark cave, lit only by a candle held by one of the bystanders, which spreads its reddish light on the rock walls and on the faces of the characters present.

The remains of Jesus, on which Carracci focused his bold chiaroscuro effects, emerge relatively from the semi-darkness. From the opening of the cave, one can see the light of dawn breaking through the darkness in the distance.

The composition is also highly effective. The foreshortened body of the Lord is carried by a group of people, in various poses, who present him to the viewer: Christ's frontal position and the observation point inside the cave make the viewer fully participate in the event, a compositional solution that heralds Baroque painting.

In the right corner, Mary Magdalene, sitting on the ground with her hands clasped, painfully contemplates the unfolding event. This figure may have been paraphrased by Reni – who according to Malvasia was the first to copy the Burial of Carracci – when he painted the mother at the center of his Massacre of the Innocents.

Outside the cave are the pious women, behind whom the light of dawn rises.

It has been hypothesized that Carracci may have used as a model for the Metropolitan copper the altarpiece, of identical subject, made by Federico Barocci, about fifteen years earlier, for the Chiesa della Croce in Senigallia.

Another painting with which one can perceive an assonance, relating to the position of Jesus' body with the semi-erect bust, is the Trinity with Dead Christ by Ludovico Carracci.

== Gallery ==
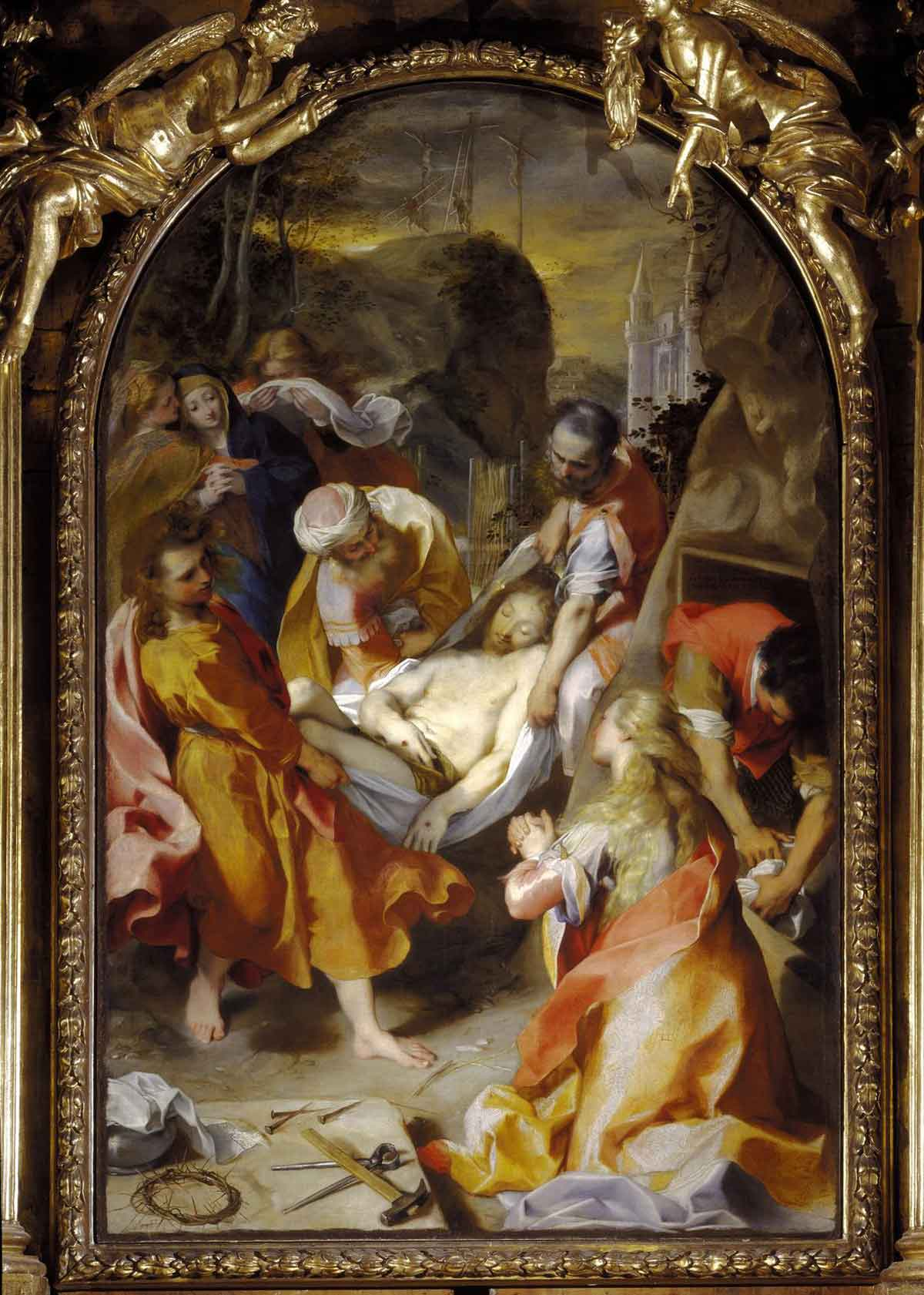
Federico Barocci, Entombment of Christ, 1579–1582, Chiesa della Croce, Senigallia

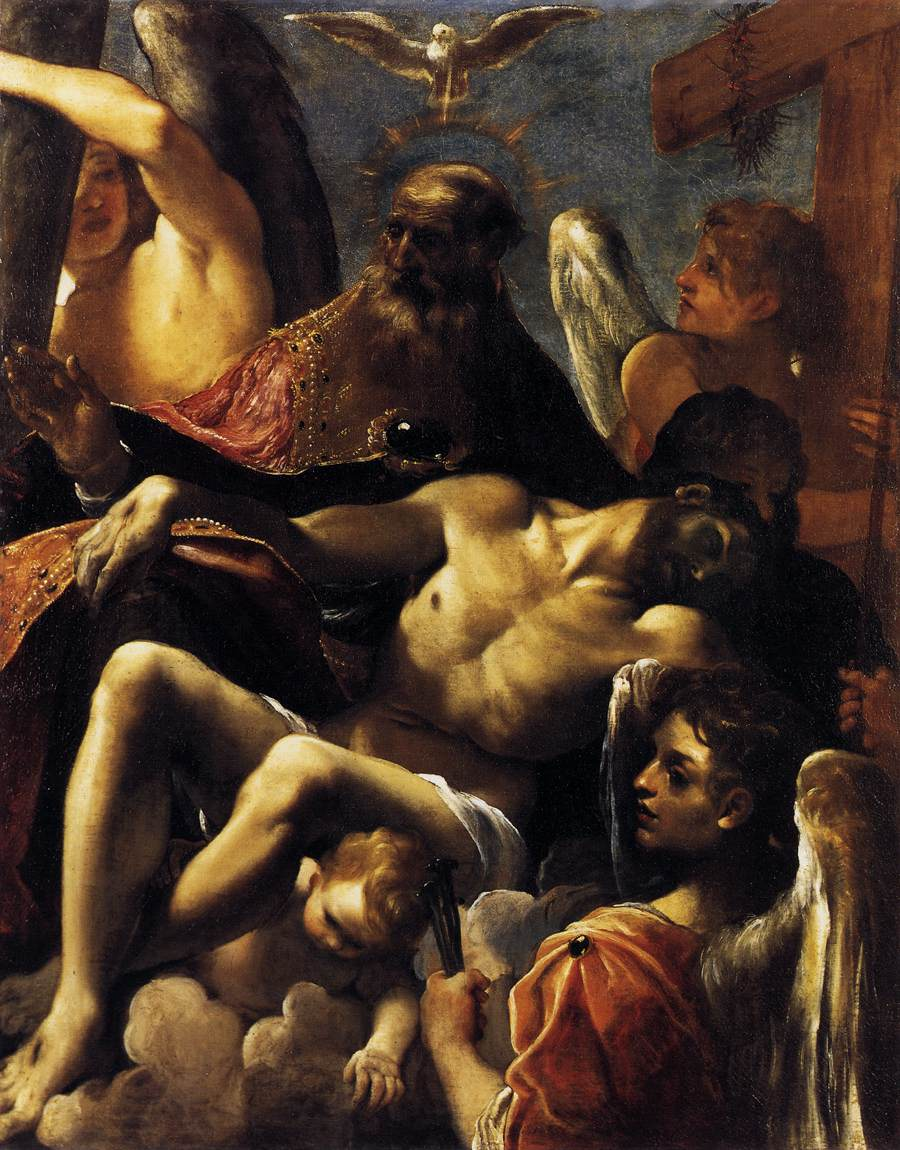
Ludovico Carracci, Trinity with the Dead Christ, circa 1590, Pinacoteca vaticana, Vatican City
