= The Entombment (Titian, 1559) =

1559 painting by Titian

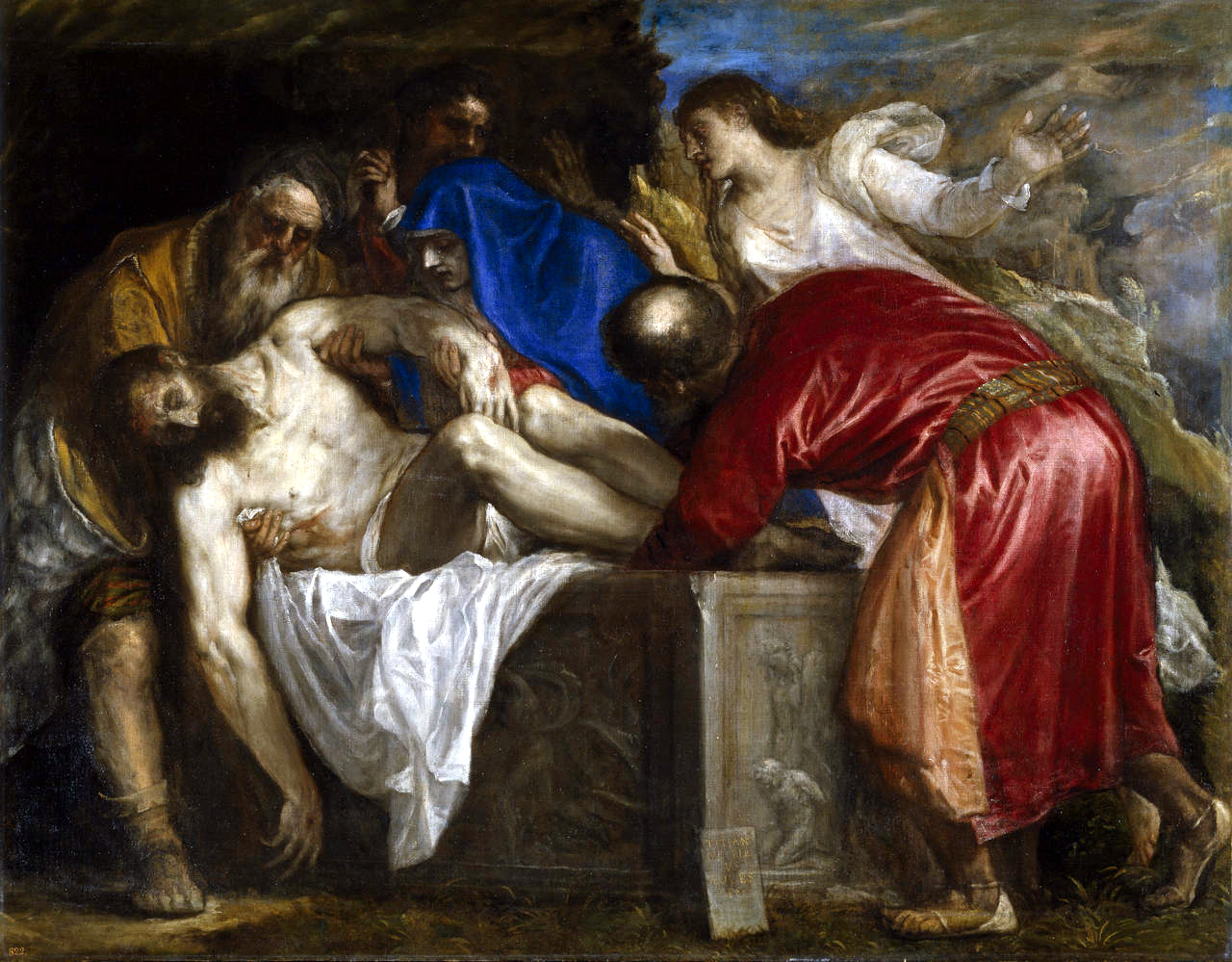
- Artist: Titian
- Year: 1559
- Medium: oil on canvas
- Dimensions: 137 cm × 175 cm (54 in × 69 in)
- Location: Museo del Prado; Madrid

The Entombment is a 1559 oil-on-canvas painting by the Venetian painter Titian, commissioned by Philip II of Spain. It depicts the burial of Jesus in a stone sarcophagus, which is decorated with depictions of Cain and Abel and the binding of Isaac. The painting measures 137 cm × 175 cm (54 in × 69 in) and is now in the Museo del Prado in Madrid. Titian made several other paintings depicting the same subject, including a similar version of 1572 given as a gift to Antonio Pérez and now also in the Prado, and an earlier version of c.1520 made for the Duke of Mantua and now in the Louvre.

The painting is the second of this subject commissioned from Titian by Philip II of Spain. A smaller version of 1557 was lost on its journey to Spain. This second larger version was sent to Spain in 1559 along with Titian's Diana and Callisto and Diana and Actaeon, arrived at El Escorial in 1574, where it was displayed in the Iglesia Vieja (Old Church) beside two other paintings by Titian: his Adoration of the Magi and his 1567 second version of Martyrdom of Saint Lawrence. Titian copies elements of this painting in his later 1572 version given to Antonio Pérez.

== Description ==
Five figures are shown accompanying the body of Christ, three of whom place Christ into the tomb: holding Christ's body is Nicodemus, the Jewish elder that secretly visited Jesus at night to learn about his teachings., while the Virgin Mary with her distinctive blue robe is holding one of Christ's arms, and at his feet is Joseph of Arimathea. Nicodemus bears the traits of the artist himself. This could have been inspired by Michelangelo's idea in his unfinished Deposition from 1550, depicting himself as Nicodemus, supporting the body of Christ, displayed in the cathedral in Florence.

The scene also depicts Mary Magdalene, to the right in a white robe with red hair, and John the Evangelist, standing behind Mary with hands clasped. The stone sarcophagus resembles examples from Ancient Rome. The unusual depiction of the Virgin, assisting with the entombment, is not mentioned in the Gospel accounts, and may derive from by Pietro Aretino's 1538 book I quattro libri de la humanità di Christo.

The painting exhibits a style under development by Titian at the time, characterized by the use of broad brushwork and brilliant colours. It is now in the permanent collection of the Museo del Prado, Madrid.

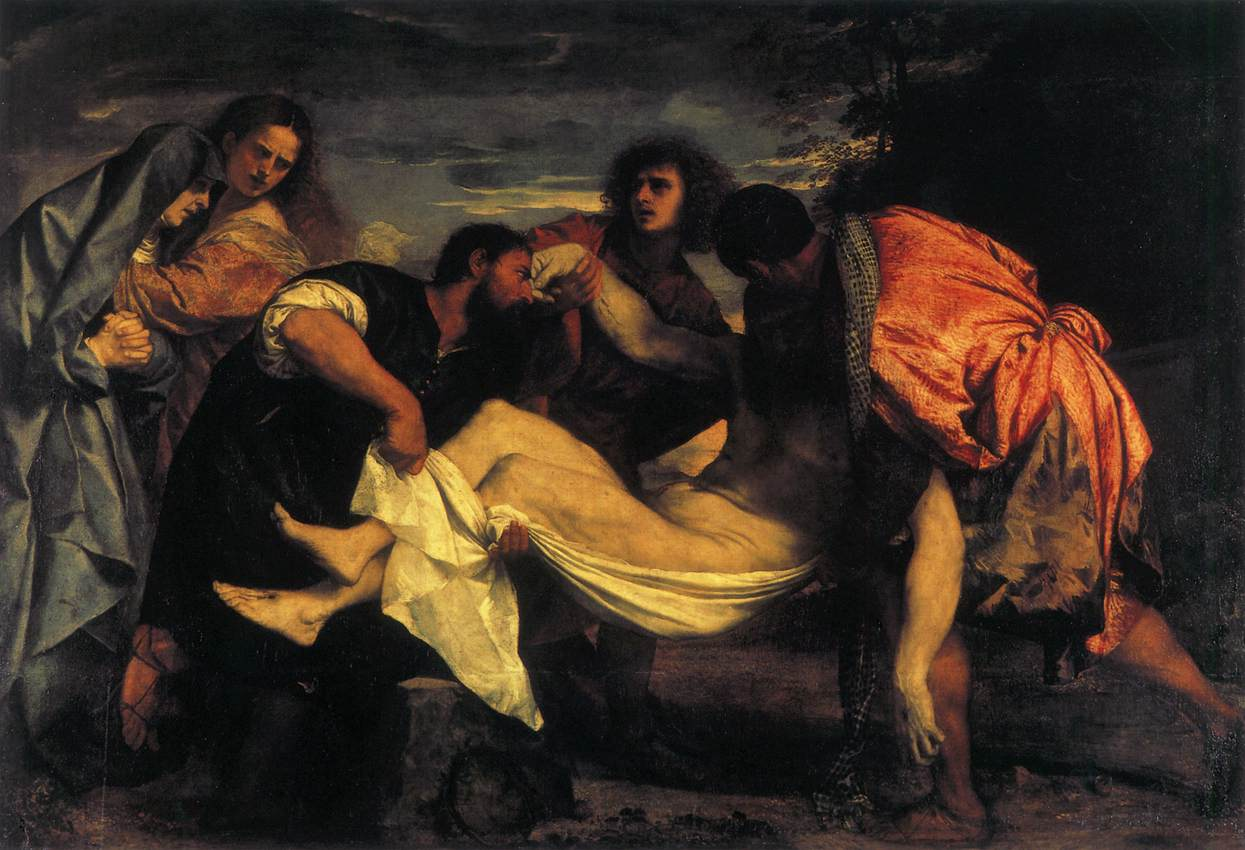
The Entombment of Christ, c.1520, Louvre

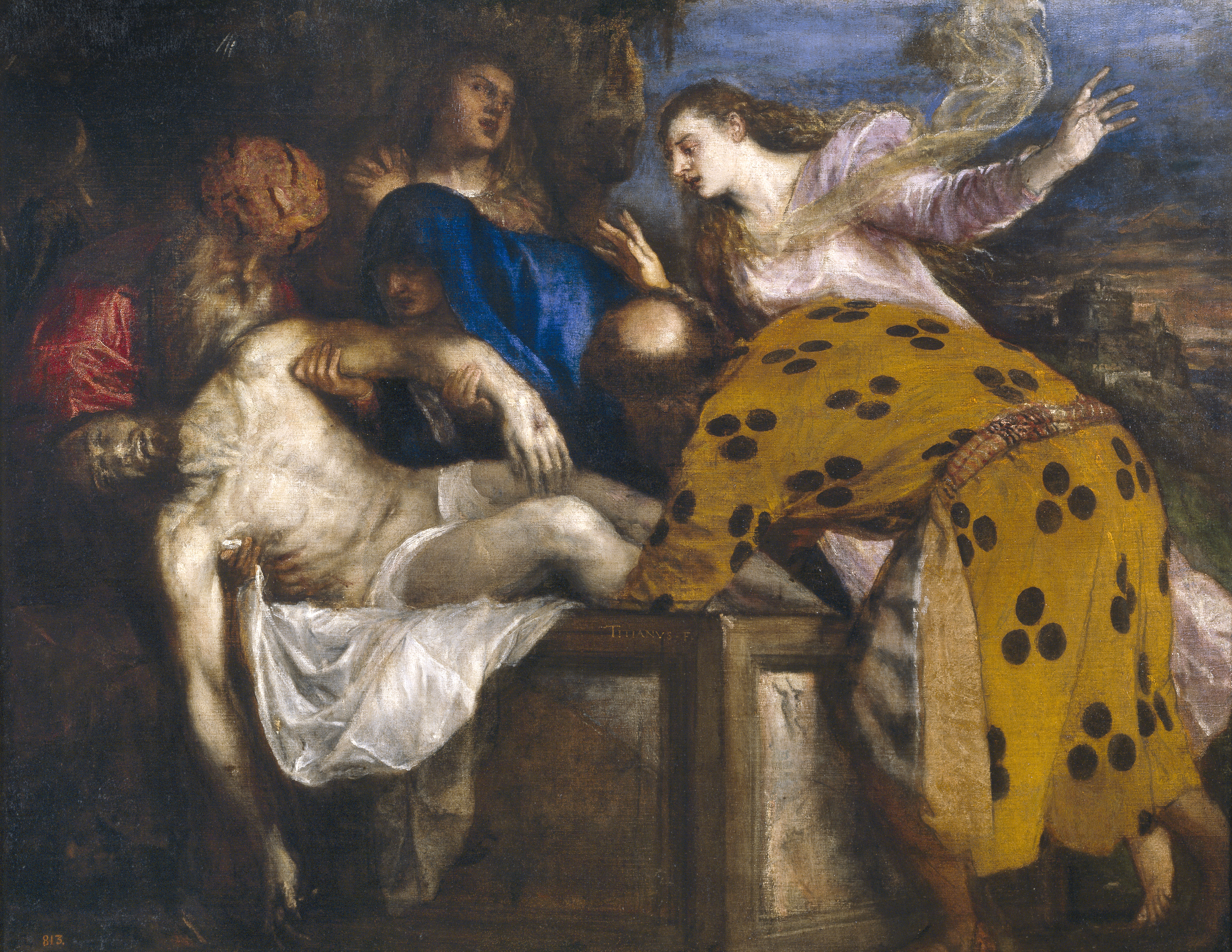
The Burial of Christ, 1572, Prado

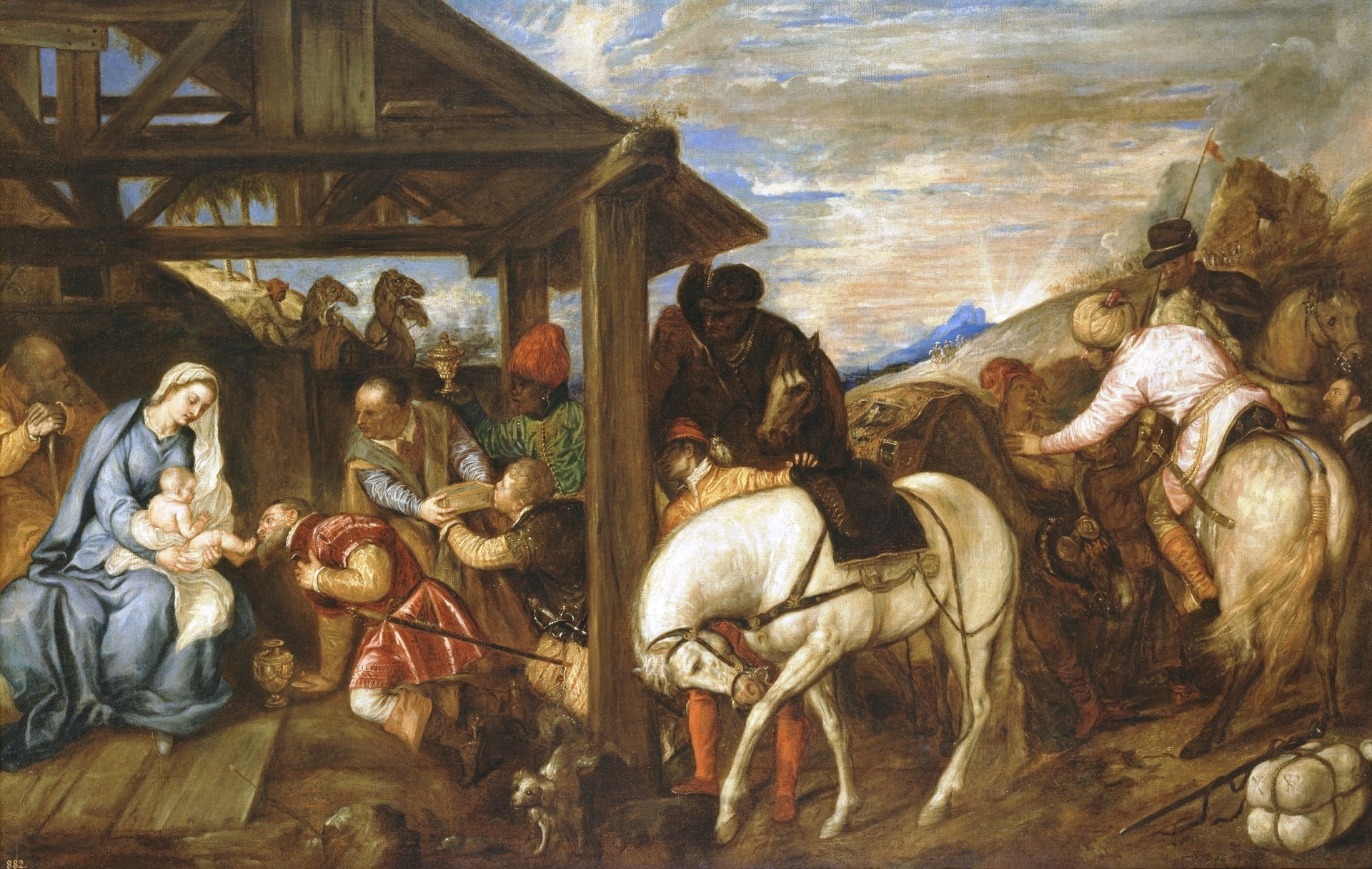
Adoration of the Magi, 16th century, Prado

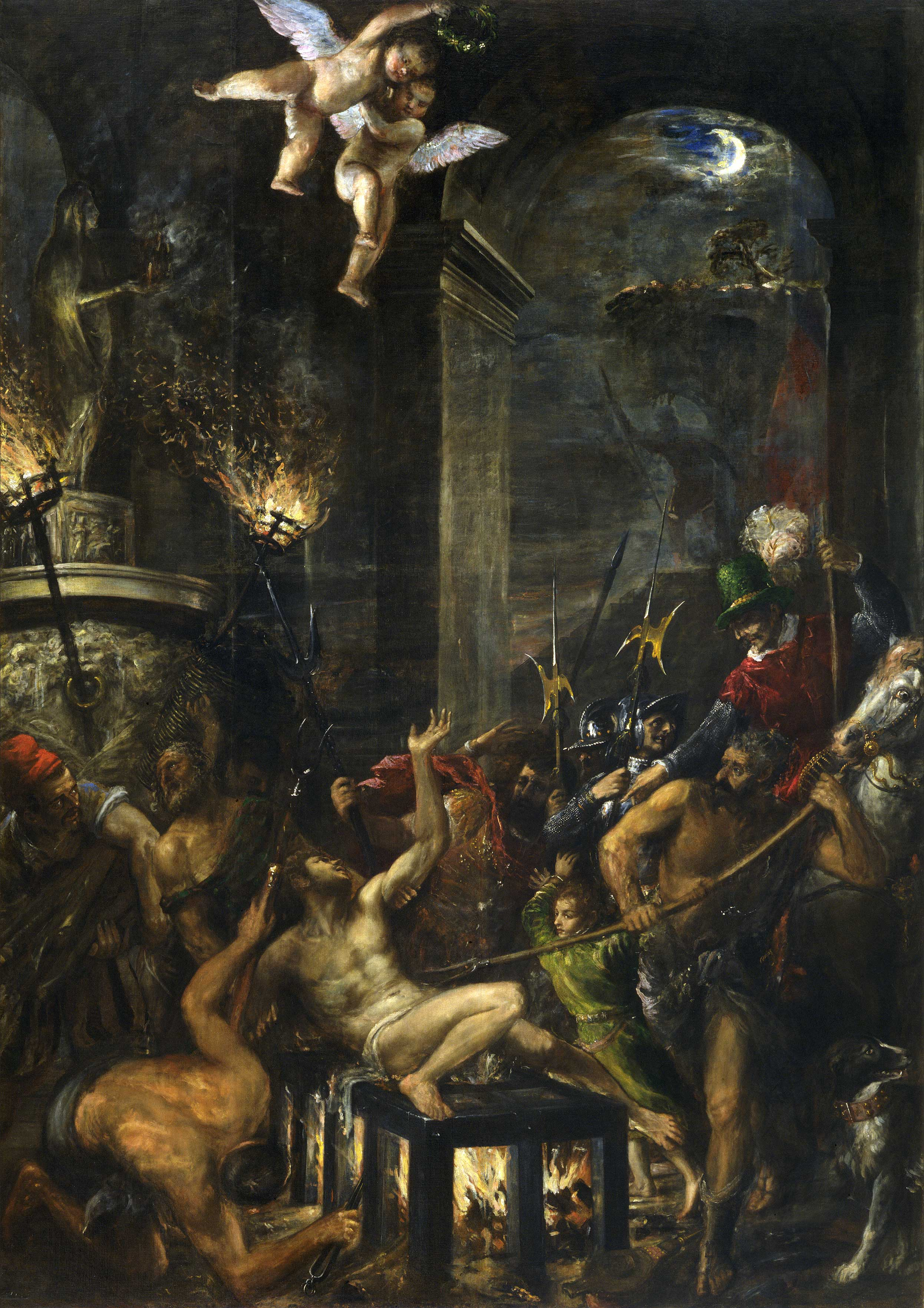
Martyrdom of Saint Lawrence, 1567, El Escorial

== See also ==
- List of works by Titian

== Bibliography ==
- Augusto Gentili, Tiziano, editore Giunti, 1990
