= Christ and the Samaritan Woman (Carracci) =

Painting by Annibale Carracci

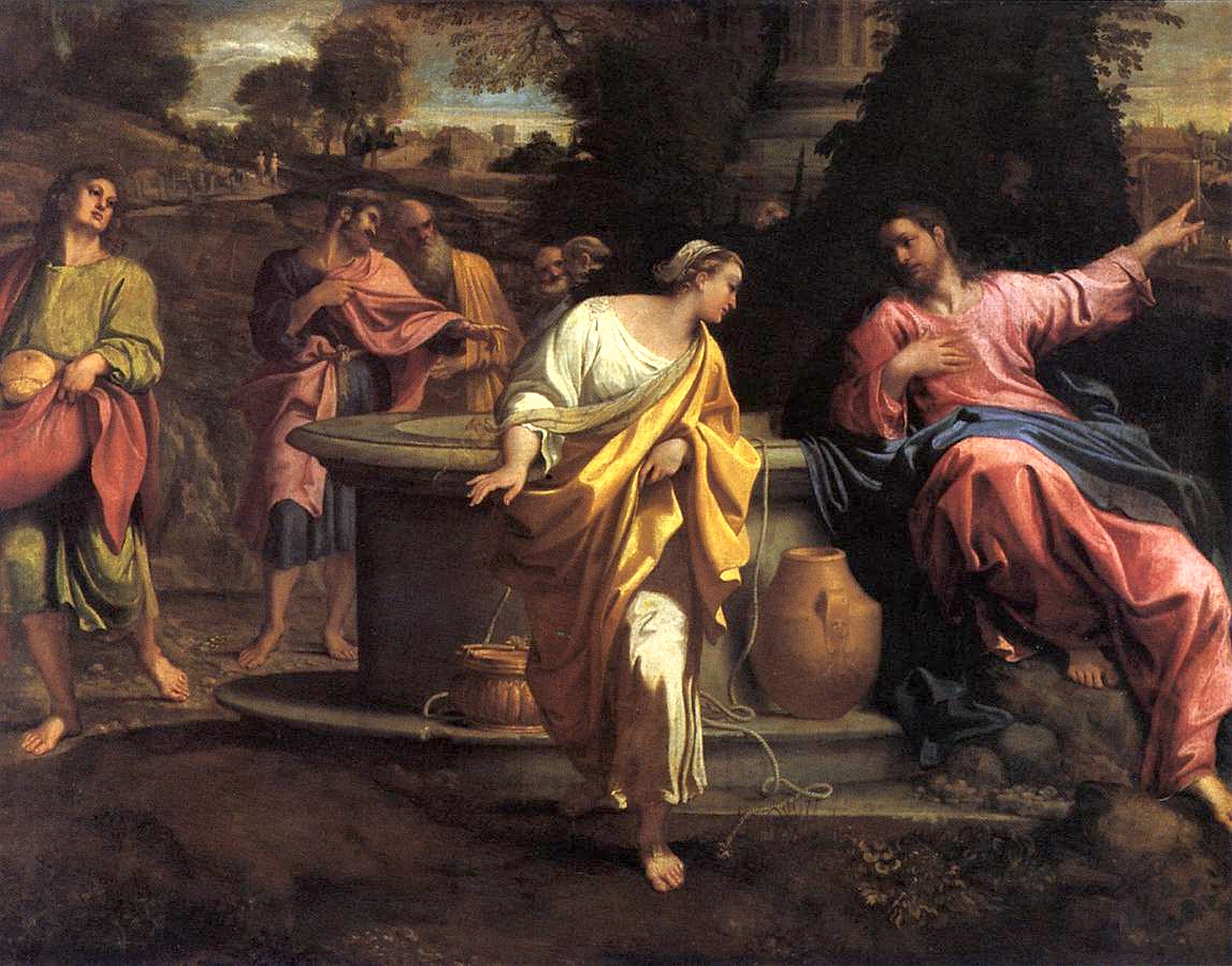
Christ and the Samaritan Woman (1593–1594)

Christ and the Samaritan Woman or The Woman at the Well is a 1593–1594 oil on canvas painting by the Italian Baroque artist Annibale Carracci, painted as part of the same scheme as the Palazzo Sampieri frescoes. Several years later he also produced a much smaller autograph copy with variations, now in the Museum of Fine Arts, Budapest.

It was part a set or cycle of works showing Gospel scenes of Christ meeting women – the other two were Christ and the Canaanite Woman by Ludovico Carracci and Christ and the Woman Taken in Adultery by Agostino Carracci, with all three painted as over-door works. All three now hang in the Pinacoteca di Brera, which acquired them and several other works from the Sampieri collection in 1811.

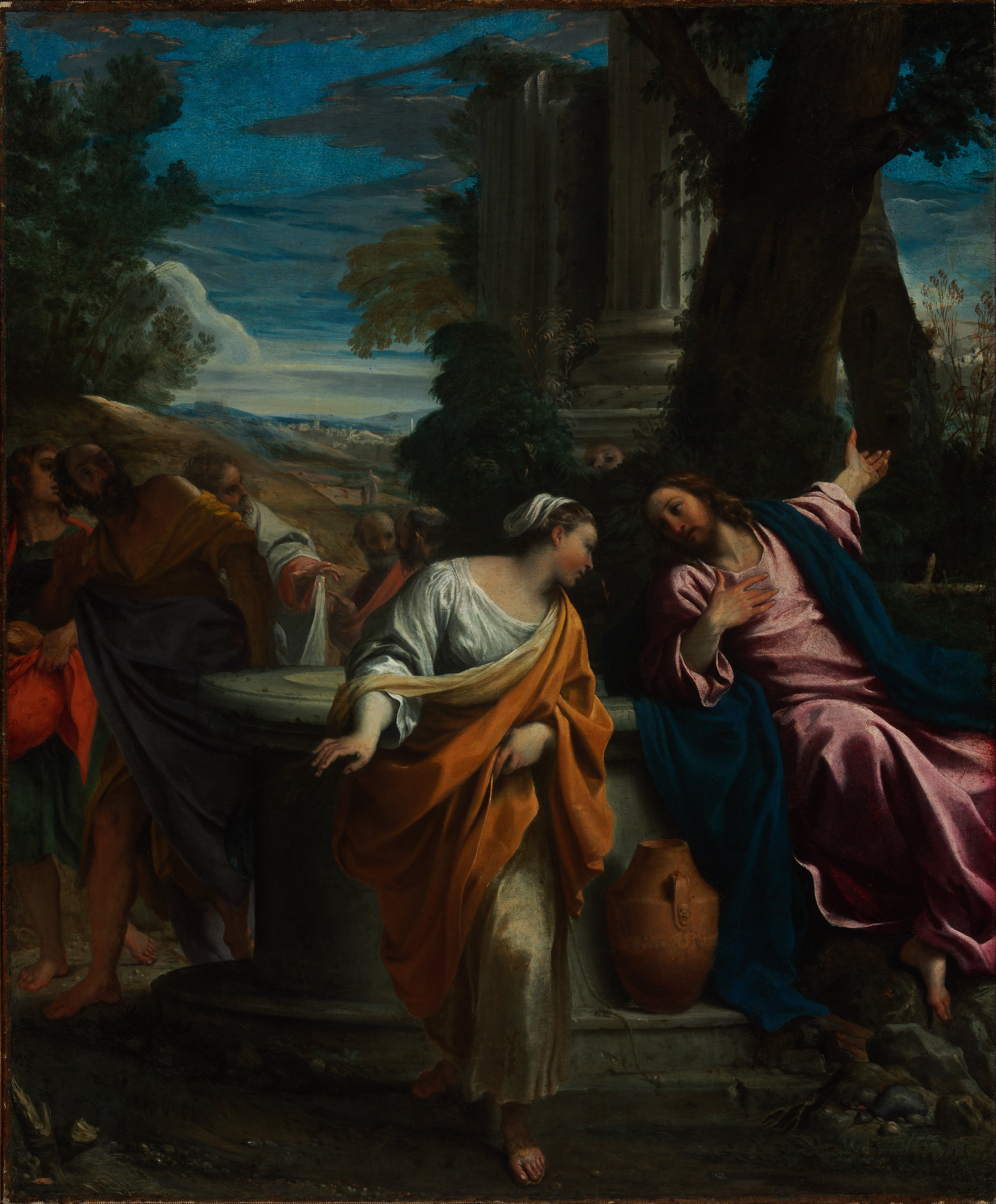
The Budapest copy

It belongs to a time in Annibale's career when the influence of Venetian painting began to combine with the central Italian tradition of painting as he returned to the example of his old master Correggio. It contains not only references to Veronese but a closer attention to classical values, so much so that Denis Mahon calls it "proto-Poussinesque". It is based on a preparatory drawing traditionally attributed to Ludovico Carracci, but later reattributed to Agostino Carracci, now in the British Museum, though Annibale alters it in several ways.

This work and Saint Roch Giving Alms were the only two early paintings by the artist to be reproduced in print during the painter's lifetime. The print of Christ and the Samaritan Woman is attributed either to Guido Reni, Francesco Brizio or even by a minority of critics to Annibale himself. Its first run dates to 1595, very soon after the painting was finished.
