= The Entombment of Christ (Delacroix) =

Painting by Eugène Delacroix after Titian

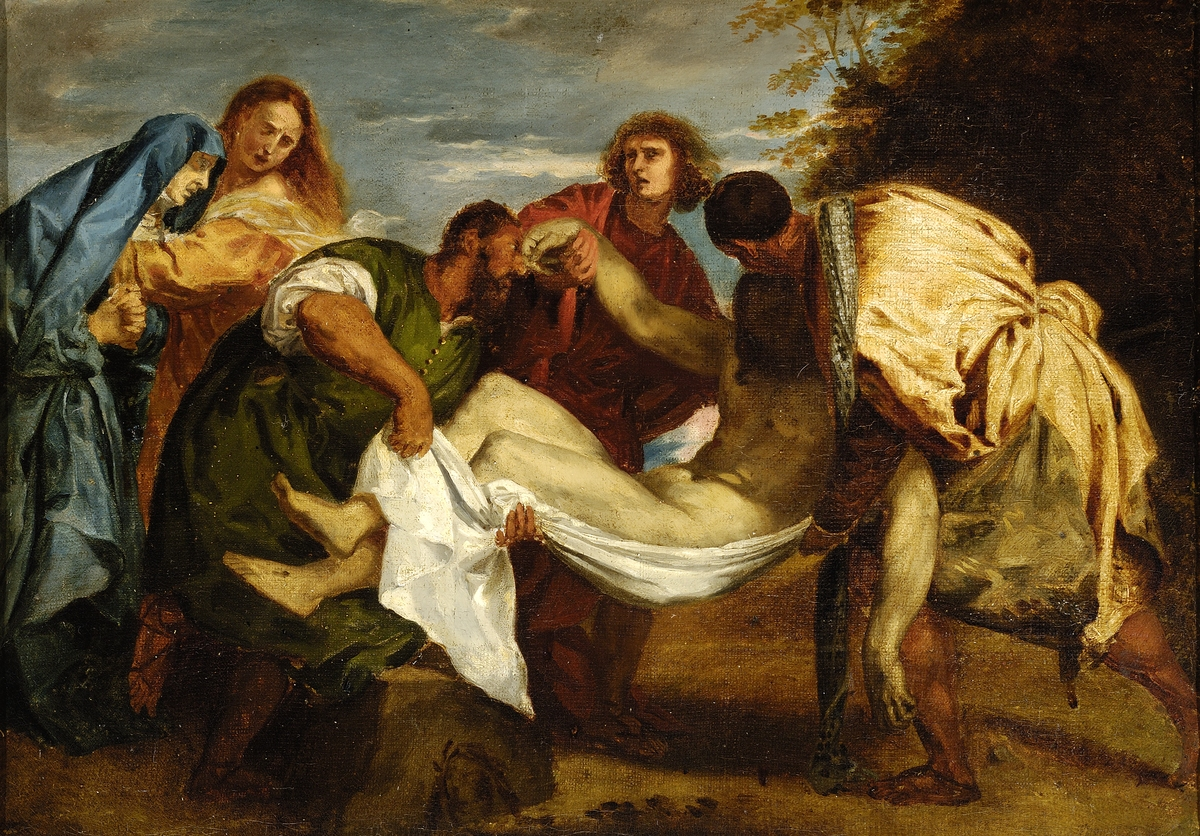
The Entombment of Christ (1820) by Eugène Delacroix

The Entombment of Christ is an 1820 painting by the French artist Eugène Delacroix, constituting a minor reworking of The Entombment of Christ, a c.1520 work by Titian. He left it to his pupil Paul Chenavard, who in 1881 left it to the musée des Beaux-Arts de Lyon, where it still hangs.

== History of the work ==
This painting is a copy of Titian's painting, named The Transport of Christ to the Tomb, kept at the Louvre. It is part of a long list of copies of Titian's painting. The Transport of Christ to the Tomb was painted for the Gonzaga Duke of Mantua. It is a canvas inspired by Raphael, a contemporary of Titian, but the latter breathed into the work a dramatic, clean scope, in the sense that it is contained: twilight sky, particular use of the play between shadow and light. light, the Virgin Mary, broken with pain before the body of Jesus Christ, is painted with great compassion. Delacroix tackled this painting because he was struck by a kind of coldness, of dryness in the work of Titian. He says he is struck by “the insignificance and flatness of the painting”. The Entombment of Christ was bequeathed by Eugène Delacroix to Paul Chenavard, one of his students. Chenavard himself donated it to the Museum of Fine Arts in Lyon in 1881. This painting was restored in 1979 by Alain G. Boissonnas, being the subject of an aqueous relining respecting the original format.

== Bibliography ==
- Delacroix copiste, copier créer de Turner à Picasso. 300 œuvres inspirées par les maîtres du Louvres, Paris, 26 avril-26 juillet 1993. Réunion des musées nationaux.
