= Chiesa della Croce, Senigallia =

Roman Catholic church in Marche, Italy

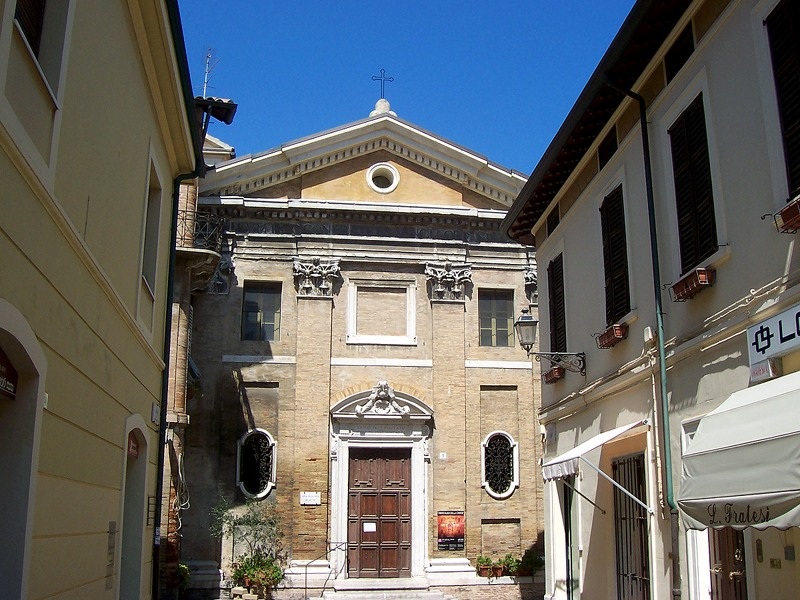
Facade of church

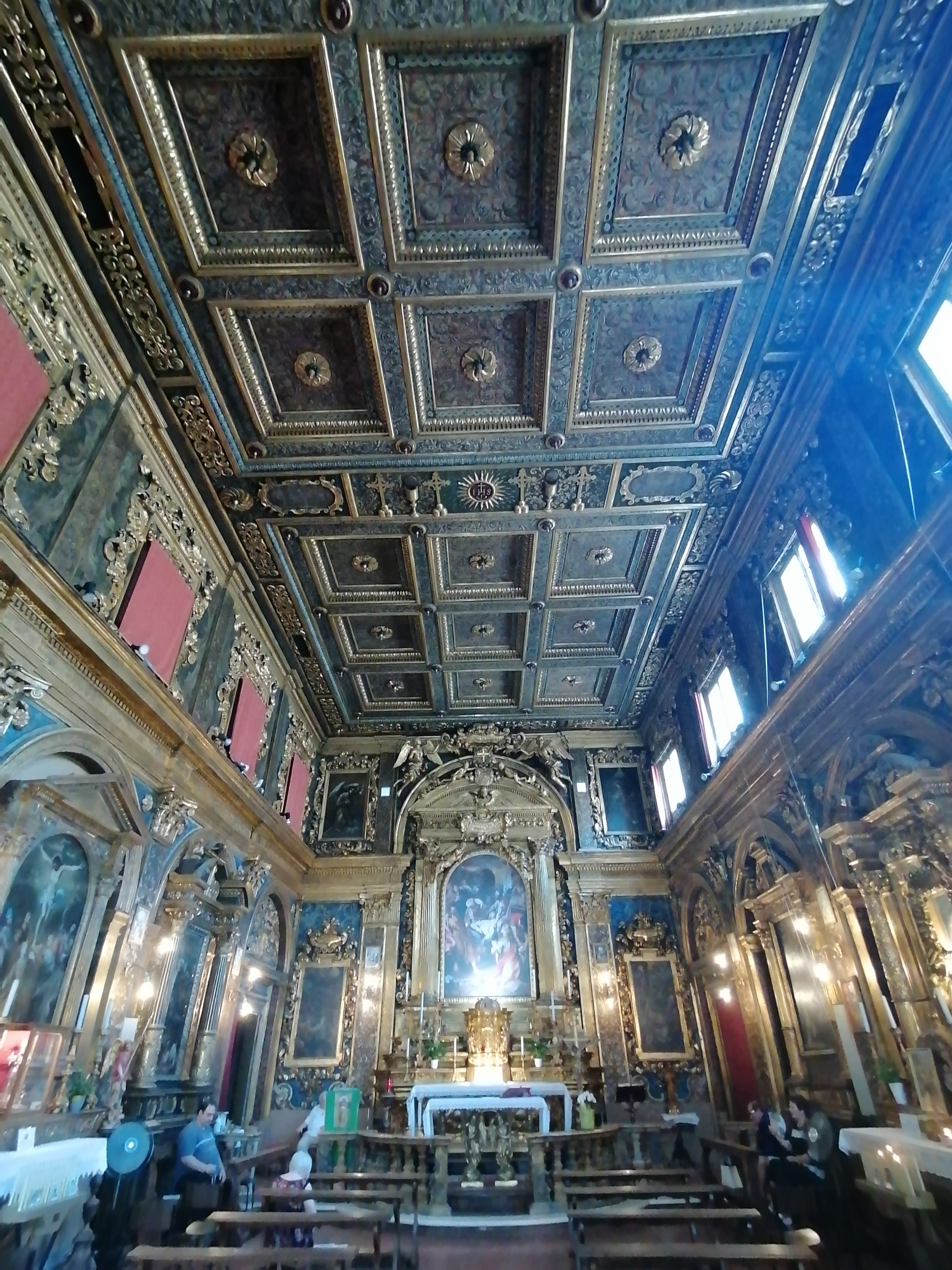
Interior of the church

The Chiesa della Croce or Church of the Cross, is a late-Renaissance-style, Roman Catholic church located on Via Gherardi in Senigallia, region of Marche, Italy. The interior is decorated in a Baroque-style.

== History ==
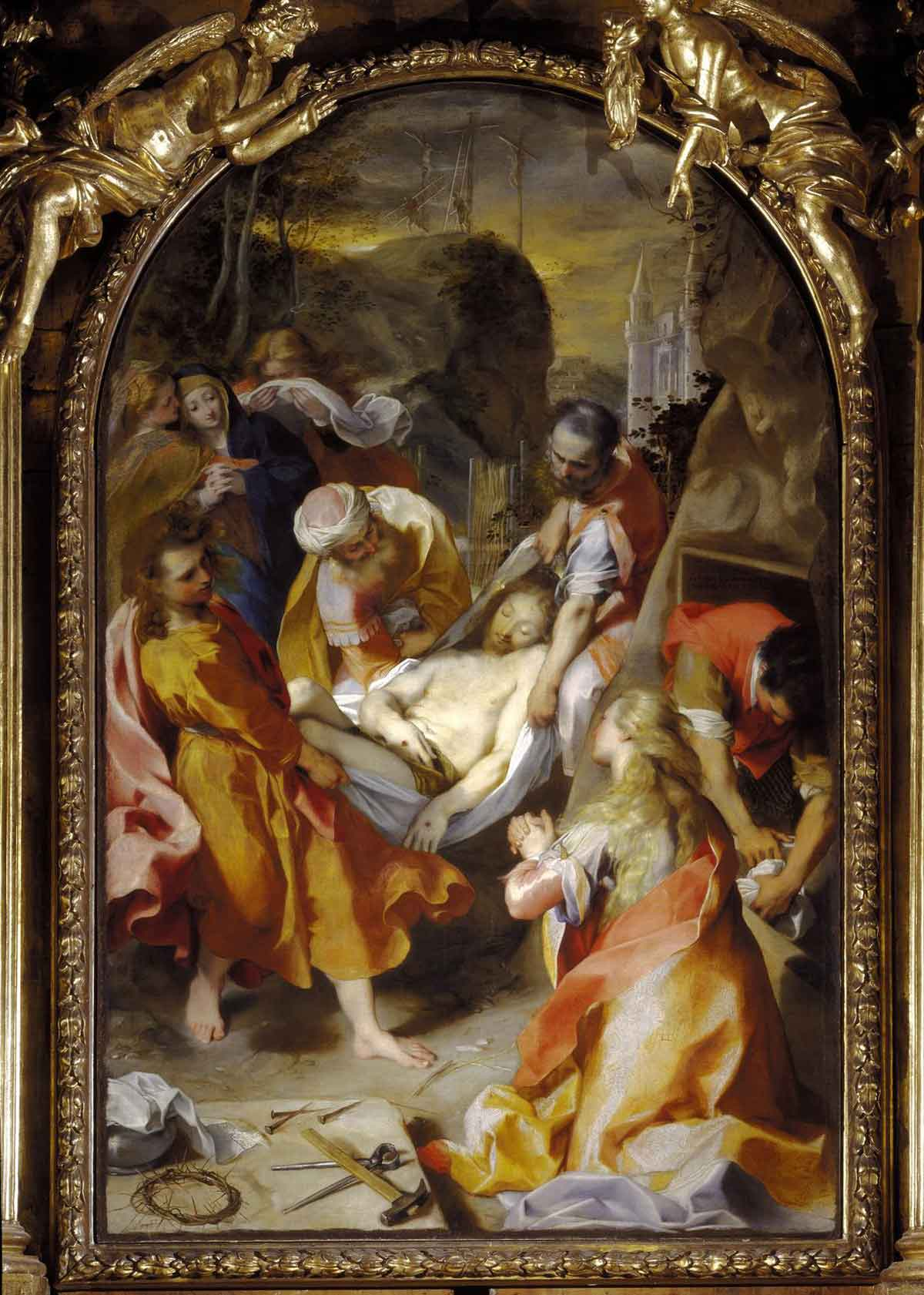
Deposition in Tomb by Barocci

The Confraternity of the Sacrament and della Croce commissioned a design of this church from the architect Muzio Oddi. Construction was complete by 1608. The confraternity was involved in charity. The facade has been attributed to Girolamo Marini.

The interior has six lateral altars. One has an altarpiece depicting Deposition of Christ in Tomb (1592) by Federico Barocci. This canvas has an image of the Ducal Palace of Urbino in the background. The organ was constructed by Pietro Callido in 1792.

The church also has canvases depicting the Nativity and Epiphany by Giovanni Anastasi.
