= Saint Roch Giving Alms =

Painting by Annibale Carracci

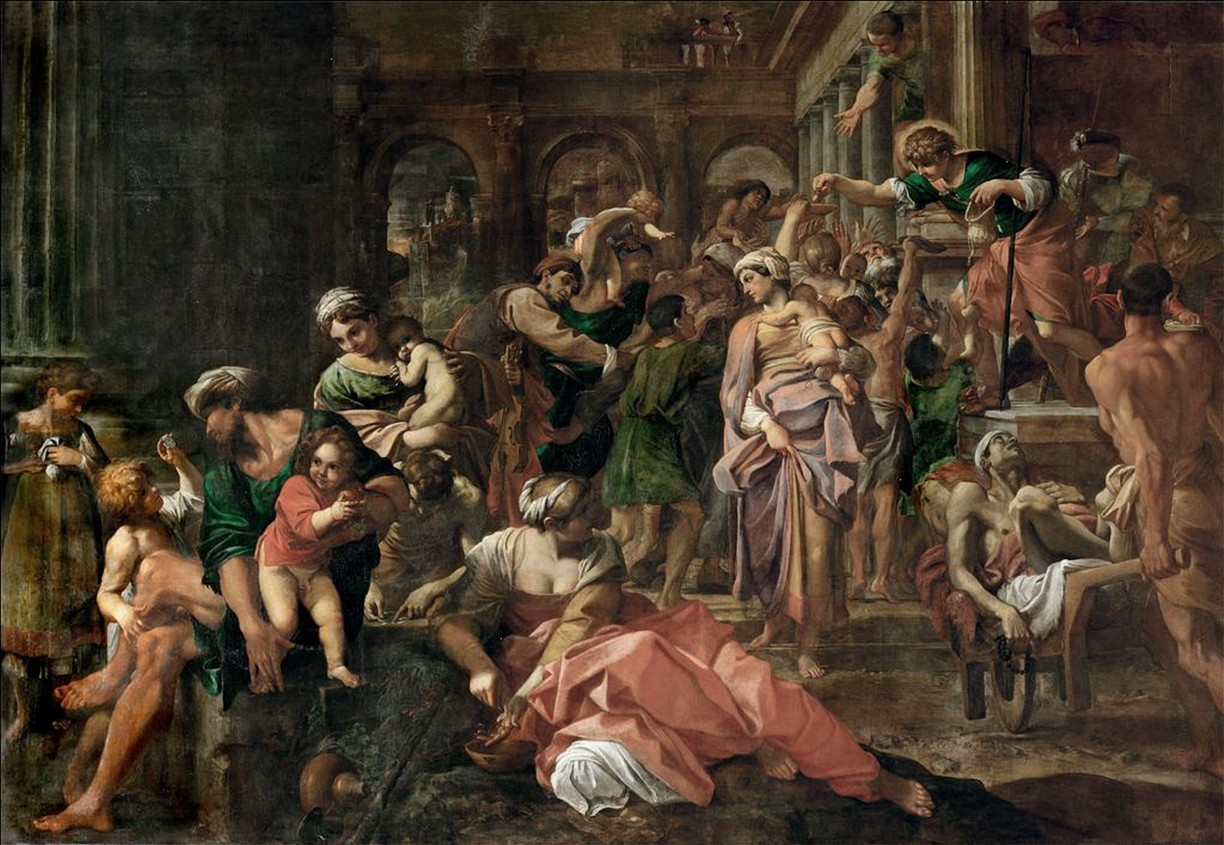
Saint Roch Giving Alms (1587–1595) by Annibale Carracci

Saint Roch Giving Alms is an oil on canvas painting by the Italian Baroque painter Annibale Carraci, commissioned between 1587 and 1588 by the Confraternity of San Rocco in Reggio Emilia, a body for whom he produced several works. His largest work on panel or canvas (as opposed to fresco), it is the crowning achievement of his career before his move to Rome. Only completed in 1595, it is now in the Gemäldegalerie Alte Meister in Dresden, Germany.

== History ==
The commission is dated by an 8 July 1595 letter to the commissioners from the artist stating it had been commissioned "seven years earlier" and came at almost exactly the same time as the commission for an Assumption of the Virgin altarpiece, now also in Dresden. It was intended for one of the long walls of the Confraternity's oratory, now destroyed, facing Saint Roch Healing Plague Victims, a c.1585 painting by Camillo Procaccini in an identical format, destroyed in the bombing of Dresden.

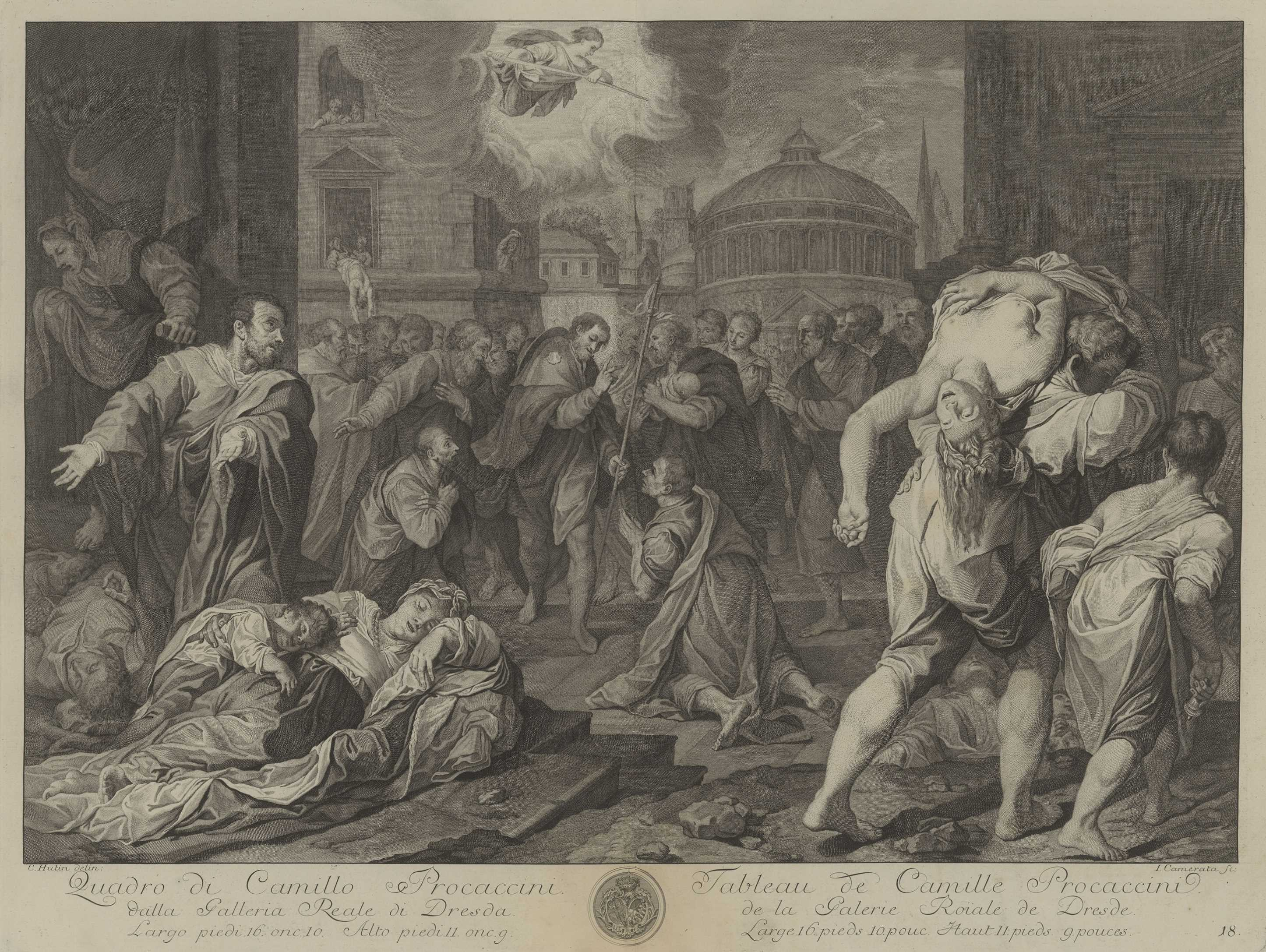
A print of Camillo Procaccini's lost painting

The episode of the "Alms" was also supposed to be painted by Procaccini: it is unclear whether it was he who renounced this second commission or whether it was the members of the Confraternity, appreciating the art of Annibale – by then well-known in Reggio, having already created other works there, in addition to the Assumption for the same oratory of San Rocco – who decided to change painter.

Perhaps because of other commitments, Annibale, who had become one of the most sought-after artists in the Emilian area in those years, significantly delayed the execution of the painting. So much so that, in 1594, when Carracci was about to move to Rome, summoned by Odoardo Farnese, the "Alms" was still unfinished. Eager to begin his new Roman adventure, Annibale attempted to free himself from the commitment by proposing to his patrons that the canvas be completed by his cousin Ludovico.

Faced with the refusal of the members of the Confraternity, Annibale, who had already gone to Rome to finalize the agreements with the Farnese, returned to his homeland and completed the work at the end of 1595, moving in the same year (or at the beginning of the following) permanently to the city of the popes.

It has been hypothesized that upon returning from his first brief stay in Rome the painting was little more than a sketch and that therefore the work was almost entirely completed by Annibale in the few months that separated his temporary return to Emilia from the definitive start of his service for Odoardo Farnese.

In 1661 the painting was purchased by Duke Alfonso IV d'Este and then entered the Este collections in Modena.

In 1746, Saint Roch Giving Alms was included (with various other works by Annibale) in the Vendita di Dresda, the sale en bloc of the one hundred best paintings of the Este collections, decided by Francesco III d'Este, to deal with the substantial bankruptcy of the Este duchy. The purchaser of this extraordinary collection of paintings was the Elector of Saxony Augustus III. The "Alms of Saint Roch" thus landed in Dresden, where it still resides today.

== Analysis ==
The painting depicts the moment when the young Saint Roch, having decided to become a pilgrim (in fact, he is already wearing the habit), disposes of his newly inherited family possessions, donating them to the poor. This is, therefore, the initial episode of the young man's journey to sainthood, which will culminate in his assistance and miraculous healings of plague victims, thanks to which Saint Roch will earn, throughout Europe, heartfelt popular devotion as a protector against the plague, as evidenced by countless works of art.

The lost painting by Procaccini alluded to this subsequent part of the hagiography of Saint Roch. The two large canvases, therefore, were "pendants" on the life of the saintly miracle-worker, whose commission is likely linked to the strengthening of the cult of Saint Roch caused by the recent "Plague of Saint Charles," an epidemic which, although concentrated mainly in the Milanese area, also struck parts of Emilia.

The episode depicted by Annibale takes place in the courtyard of a palace framed by a monumental colonnade, probably the family palace of Saint Roch, who hagiographic sources say was born into a wealthy family from Montpellier. The scene is very crowded (with around thirty figures), scaled on several levels along a diagonal. In the foreground, on the left, is the group of beggars who have already received their alms and are contentedly contemplating what they have received. At the center of this first group, Annibale places, at the bottom, a still life composed of the objects they have received as gifts. In the background is a loggia with arches and imposing quadrangular pillars on which a semi-column rests. This architectural detail recalls the portico by Sangallo in the courtyard of Palazzo Farnese, which was seen by Carracci shortly before completing the work. Between the arches of the loggia, the buildings of a city are visible.

The main event unfolds in the middle level: Saint Roch, on a podium, distributes his alms, while a fervent crowd surrounds him to receive their shares. A blind violinist, supported by a boy, and a sick man, pulled in a wheelbarrow by a muscular young man depicted from behind, also rush to join the group.

In the middle of this group, a woman with a child in her arms stands relatively isolated, her back to the commotion behind her. This figure is the focal point of the painting and the contrast between her standing position and the tangle of bodies all around, suggests that she has been assigned a particular symbolic function within the composition. In fact, the woman has been seen as a personification of the virtue of "Caritas", of which she takes up the consolidated iconographic canon (precisely that of a woman with one or more children in her arms), which underlines and summarises the meaning of the painting.

Even in this figure we can see a hint of the Roman influences on Annibale's painting due to his first stay in the city in 1594. In fact, it has been compared to the similar figure seen in the "Presentation of Mary at the Temple" (ca. 1525) by Baldassare Peruzzi located in the Church of Santa Maria della Pace.

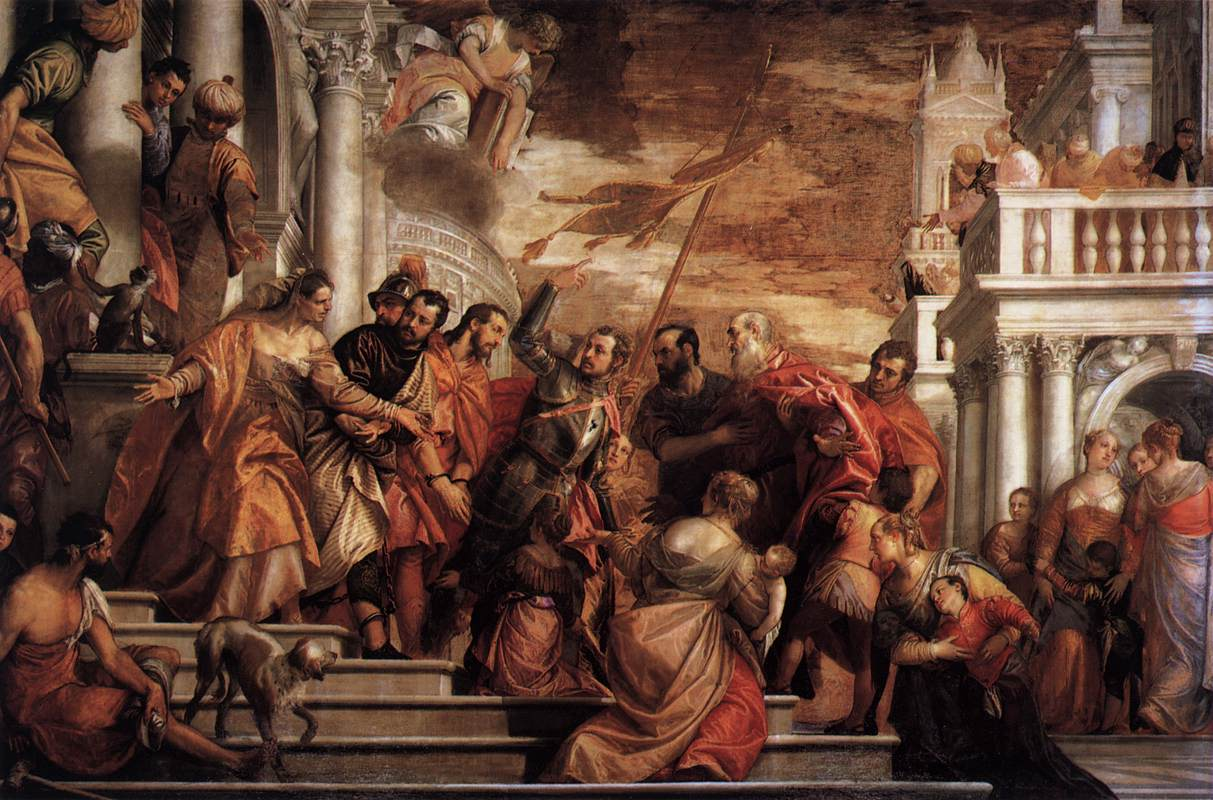
Paolo Veronese, Saints Mark and Marcellinus being Led to Martyrdom, 1565, San Sebastiano, Venice

Despite the very early Central Italian influences that can be seen in the Alms, the work still shows a debt towards Venetian painting. Annibale's painting has been linked to the "Saints Mark and Marcellinus Led to Martyrdom" by Veronese (1565). In this painting, the event takes place on a raised level, framed by a striking architectural backdrop, and the scene is inhabited by a significant number of participants, some of whom, for example the beggar at the bottom left, show similarities with those depicted by Carracci.

This debt, however, is limited only to the compositional structure, while for its strong realism, which is evident in the perceptible verisimilitude of the crowd of destitute people flocking to the distribution of the saint's goods, Annibale's "Saint Roch Giving Alms" is an innovative and original work. It was probably based on drawings taken from life, perhaps inspired by the crowd visible in a market of the time, from which Annibale borrowed the pathetic, but credible, figures of the blind violinist and the cripple on a stretcher and in which, in a composition of great effectiveness, the Bolognese master places a variety of types summarizing all the possible human reactions in front of an act of charity. For these reasons the "Saint Roch Giving Alms" is one of the fundamental opening texts of the nascent Baroque painting.

== Reception ==
Annibale's last pre-Roman masterpiece was immensely popular, as evidenced by the sources closest to him. Among these, particularly significant are the words of Francesco Scannelli, perhaps the only 17th-century biographer of Carracci to have seen the canvas in its original location. For Scannelli, in the painting "everything is so beautiful and every detail of such excellence, and rendered with the easiest and truest manner, that it reveals a concert of the most natural and beautiful that the strength of brushes can at any time represent" (Il microcosmo della pittura, 1657). Unreserved praise is also dedicated to the painting by Giovanni Pietro Bellori who defines it as "perfect action of natural modes" (Vite de' pittori, scultori e architetti moderni, 1672).

The significant number of engravings taken from the work, among which the most famous is attributed alternatively to Guido Reni or to Francesco Brizio, and of known copies (all of which are much smaller in size than the original), also attest to the great appreciation that the painting, executed for the Reggio Emilia Confraternity, received from the very beginning.

The fresco by Domenichino with the Elemosina di Santa Cecilia, executed for the Polet chapel in the church of San Luigi dei Francesi, takes up the composition of Annibale's work. The Seven Works of Mercy by the Flemish Frans Francken II, whose personification of Charity is a literal transposition of the woman with the child in her arms at the center of the Saint Roch Giving Alms, demonstrates the fame that Annibale's work had achieved beyond Italy's borders.

== Gallery ==
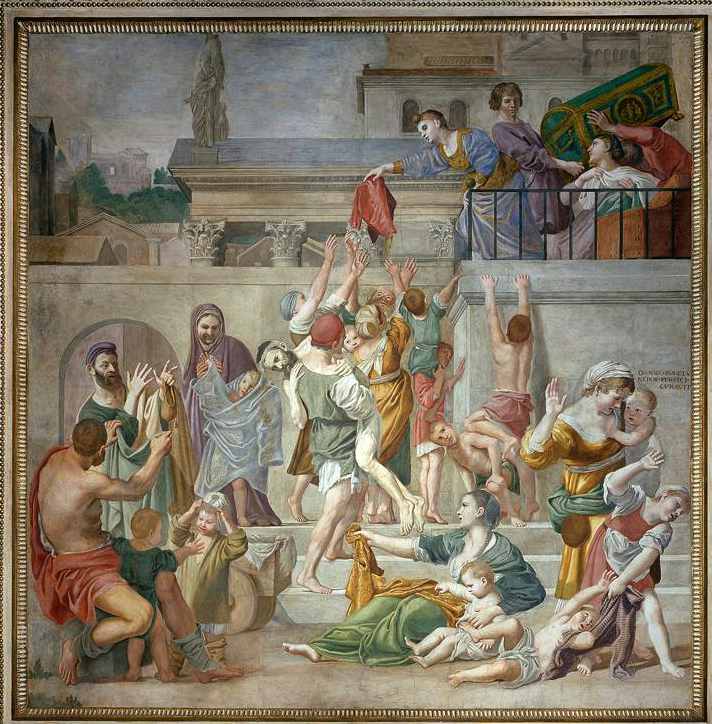
Domenichino, Saint Cecilia Giving Alms, 1612–15, San Luigi dei Francesi, Rome

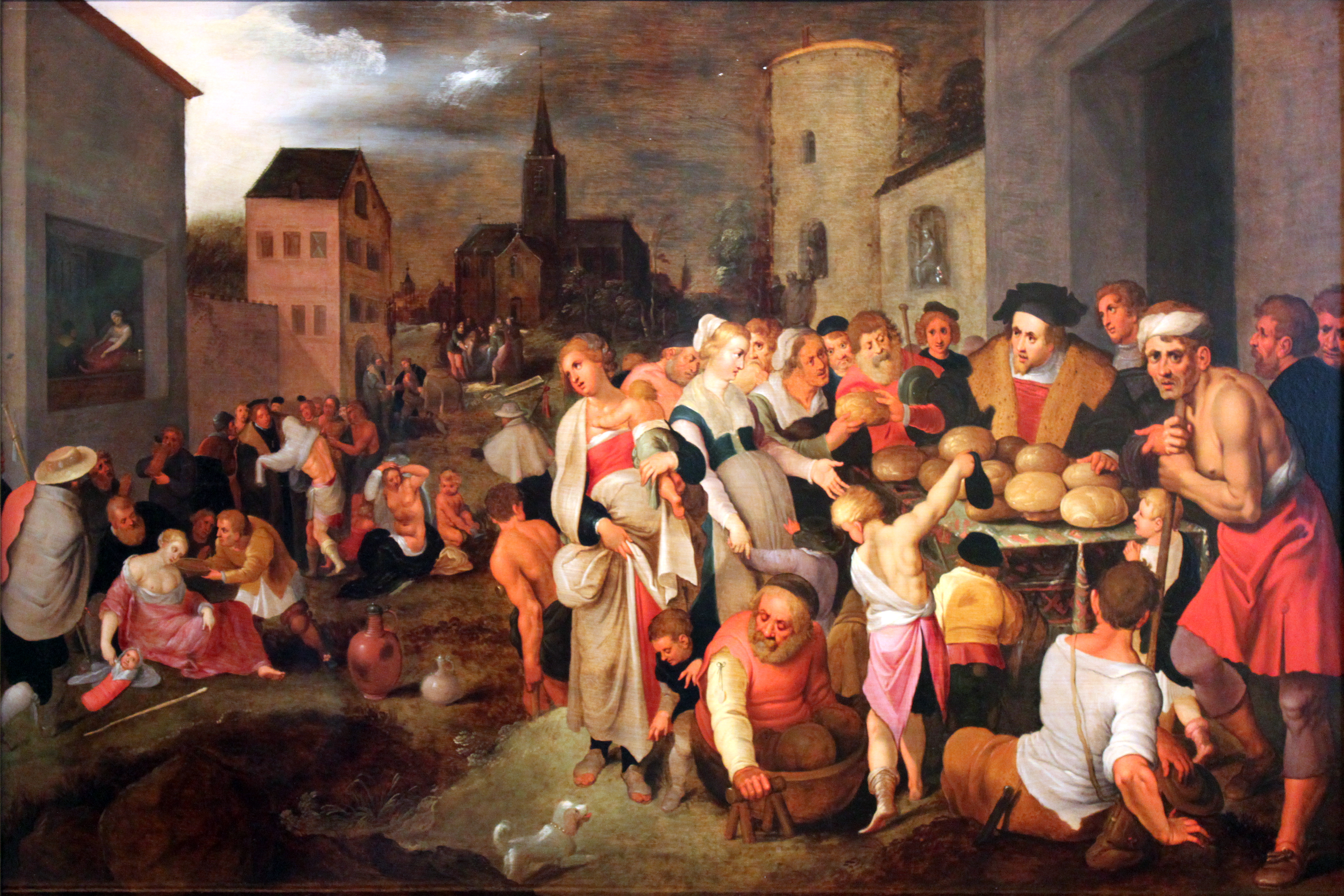
Frans Francken II, Seven Works of Charity, 1605, Deutsches Historisches Museum, Berlin

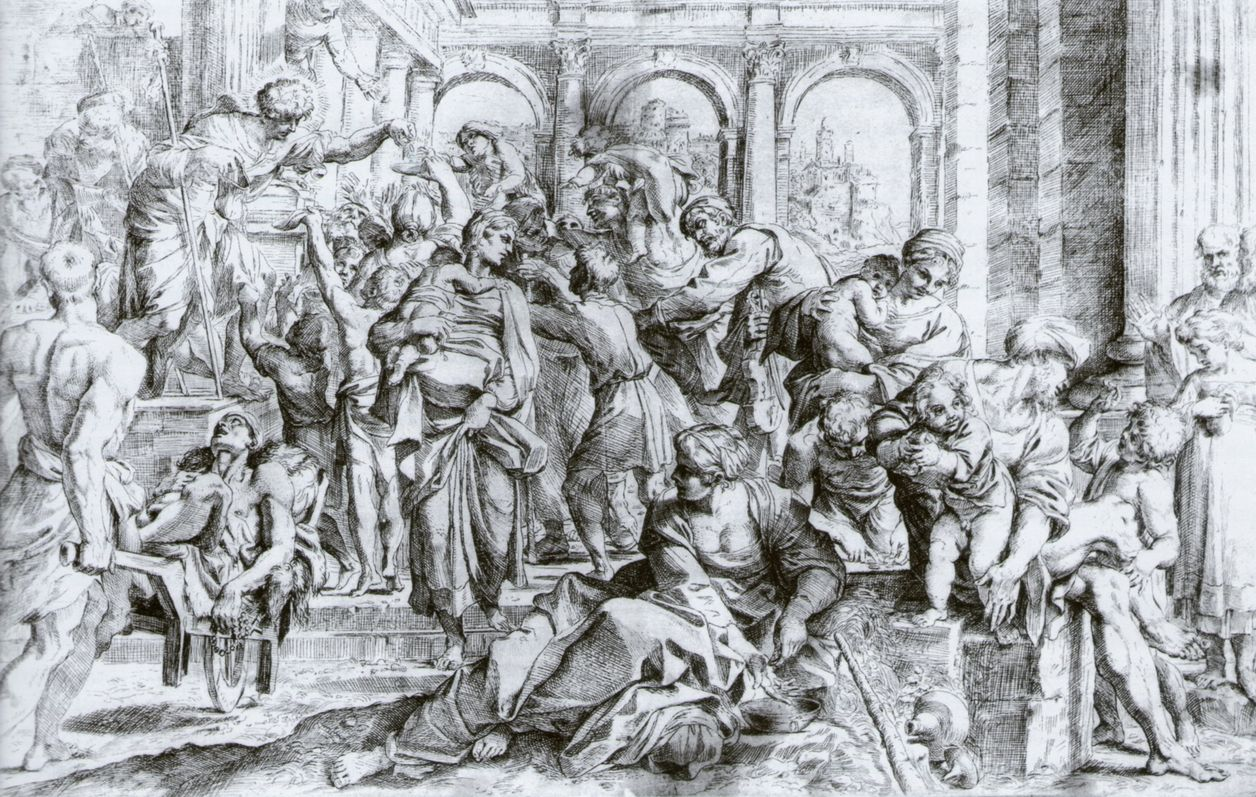
Guido Reni or Francesco Brizio, Saint Roch Giving Alms, print after the painting
