= Entombed =

Entombed may refer to:

- Entombment, a method of final disposition in which a corpse is deposited in a tomb

== Music ==
- Entombed (band), a Swedish death metal band
  - Entombed (album), 1997

== Television ==
- "Entombed", an episode of the TV series Mickey Mouse
- "Entombed" (Star Wars: The Bad Batch)

== Video games ==
- Entombed (Atari 2600), a 1982 video game by U.S. Games
- Entombed (video game), a 1985 video game by Ultimate Play the Game
- Entombed, a 1997 video game by WizardWorks

== Other uses ==
- Entombed, a 2005 novel by Linda Fairstein
