= The Martyrdom of Saint Lawrence (Titian) =

1558 painting by Titian

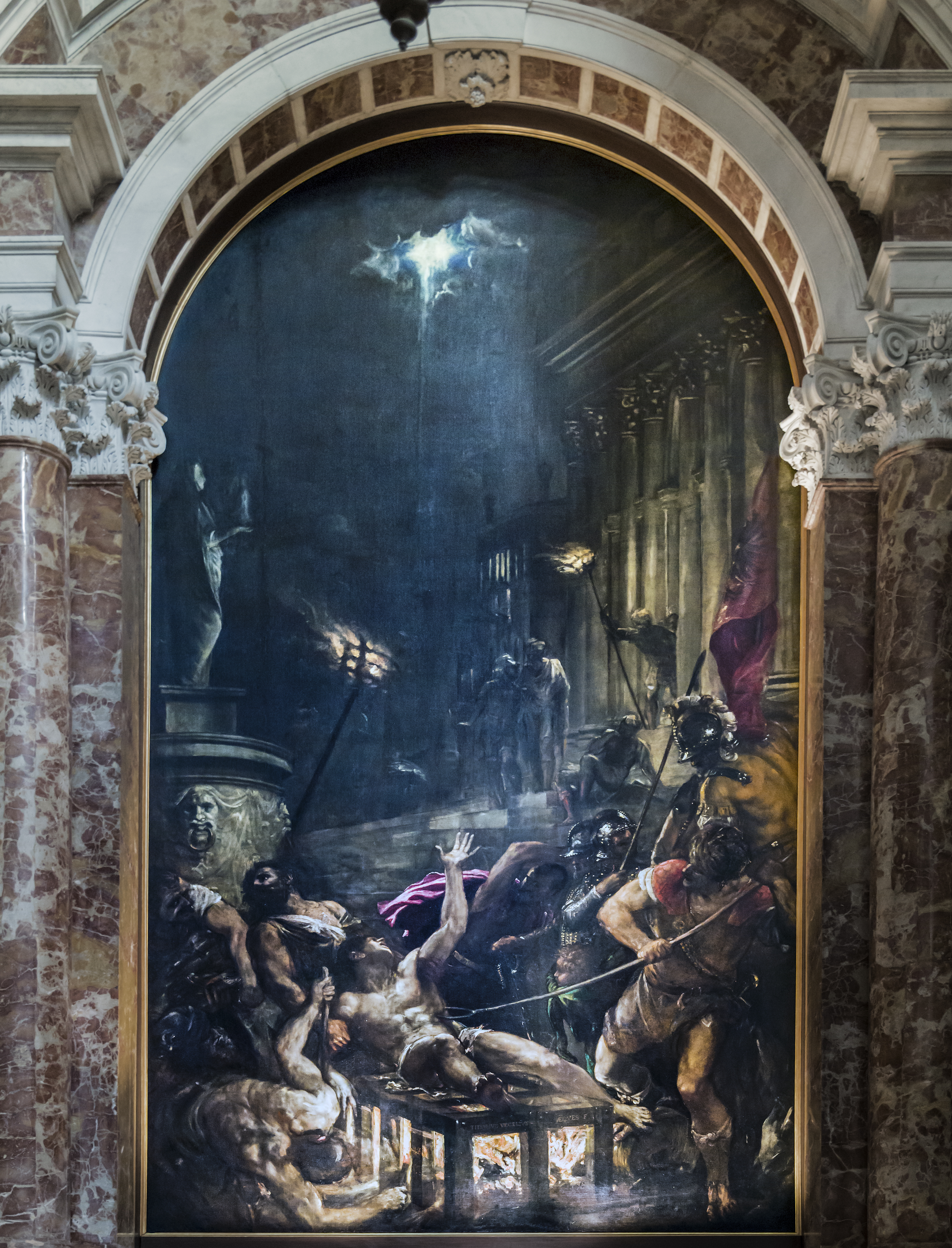
- Artist: Titian
- Year: c. 1558
- Medium: oil on canvas
- Dimensions: 493 cm × 277 cm (194 in × 109 in)
- Location: I Gesuiti; Venice

The Martyrdom of Saint Lawrence is a Renaissance era oil painting by the Venetian artist Titian, dated from 1558. It depicts the Ancient Romans' martyrdom of Saint Lawrence and was originally an altarpiece in the Church of Santa Maria Assunta dei Crociferi, although it is now in the church of I Gesuiti in Venice.

== Subject ==
Prior to Emperor Constantine's Edict of Milan, which decreed tolerance of Christianity in 313, religious persecution of Christians was common in Ancient Rome. Saint Lawrence was appointed archdeacon of Rome in 257 AD by Pope Sixtus II. One year later, in 258 AD, Saint Lawrence, six other deacons, and Pope Sixtus II were martyred in a purge of Christians ordered by Roman Emperor Valerian. According to legend, Saint Lawrence was burned alive on a gridiron which became an influential image through posthumous portrayals of his death.

== History ==
Titian's Martyrdom of Saint Lawrence was commissioned by the well-connected and wealthy Venetian couple Lorenzo Massolo and Elisabetta Querini as an altarpiece for the church of Santa Maria Assunta dei Crociferi. The church was destroyed during a suppression of the order of the Crociferi and the painting was moved to the new church of I Gesuiti in the early 18th century. It so impressed Philip II of Spain that he commissioned a second version in 1567 for the basilica at El Escorial.

== Description ==
The moment of Saint Lawrence's death is depicted in chaotic darkness. The armor and bodies of the figures are shown reflecting the light emanating from the fire at the bottom of the painting and the light shining through the clouds from above. Titian uses the contrast between these two bright spots and the rest of the painting, which is shrouded in darkness, to accentuate Saint Lawrence's mostly naked form and his outstretched arm which is reaching upwards. Titian communicates the confusing mix of tragic violence and sublime sacrifice which accompany martyrdom by surrounding the well lit figure of Saint Lawrence, which appears to be frozen in time reaching towards heaven, with a turbulent mix of darkness.

Titian's source was the Golden Legend whose depiction of Lawrence's death is closely mirrored in Titian's painting. It describes Lawrence being tortured by the Romans. He defies their demands that he renounce Christianity by referring to the holy light that protects him. This is reflected in Lawrence reaching towards the beam of light breaking through the clouds above him.

== Works cited ==
- Rosand, David (1997). Painting in Sixteenth-Century Venice (Revised ed.). Cambridge University Press. p. 56. ISBN 9780521562867.
- Sherman, Allison (2013). "Murder and Martyrdom: Titian's Gesuiti "Saint Lawrence" as a Family Peace Offering". Artibus et Historiae. 34 (68): 39–54. ISSN 0391-9064.
- Jacobus, De Voragine, Approximately, William Caxton, and Lessing J. Rosenwald Collection. Westminster, 20 Nov, 1483. Retrieved from the Library of Congress, https://www.loc.gov/item/48043527/.

== See also ==
- List of works by Titian
