= Palazzo Sampieri frescoes =

Set of paintings by Annibale, Agostino and Ludovico Carracci

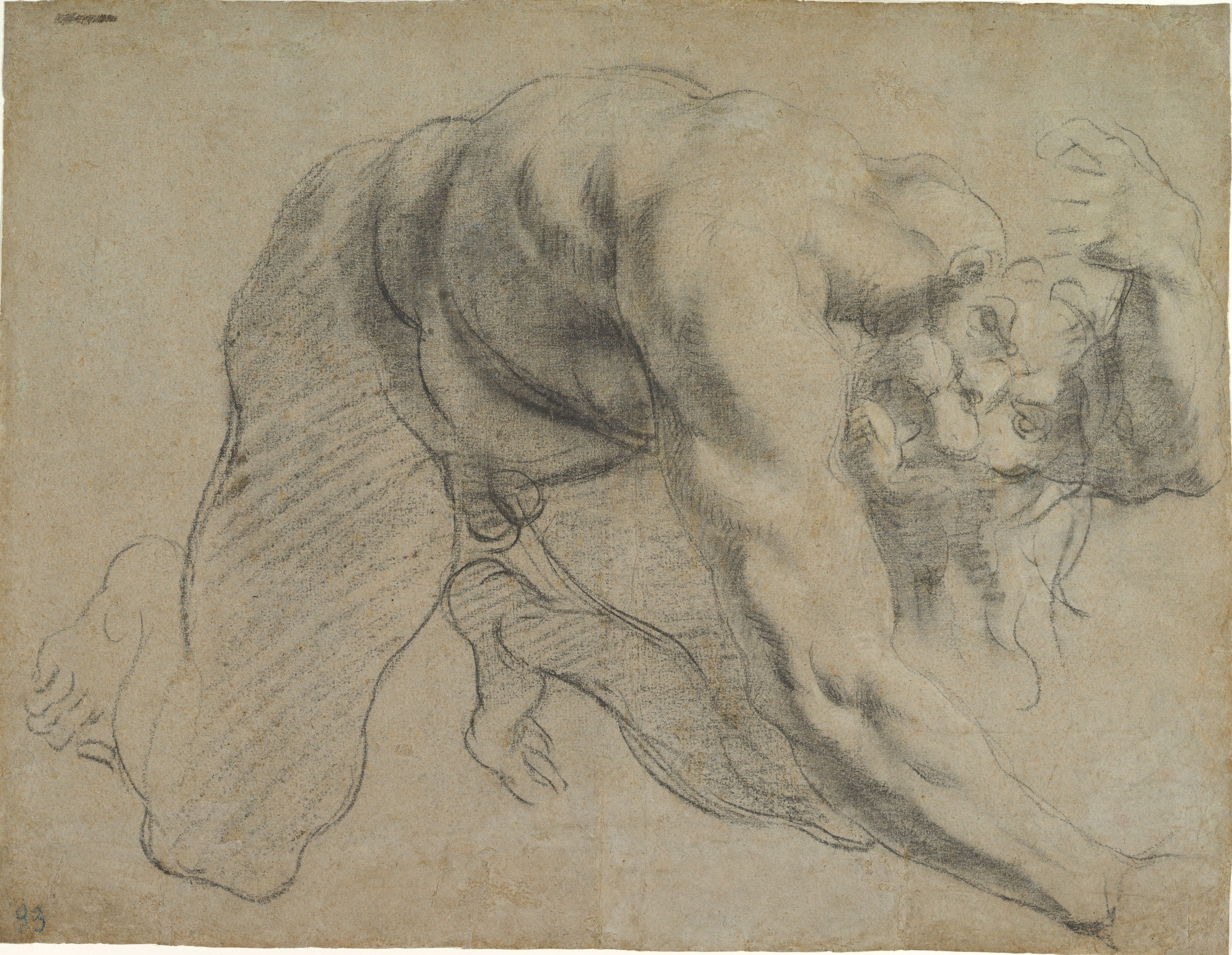
A study by Annibale Carracci for one of the frescoes at the Palazzo Sampieri (Metropolitan Museum, New York).

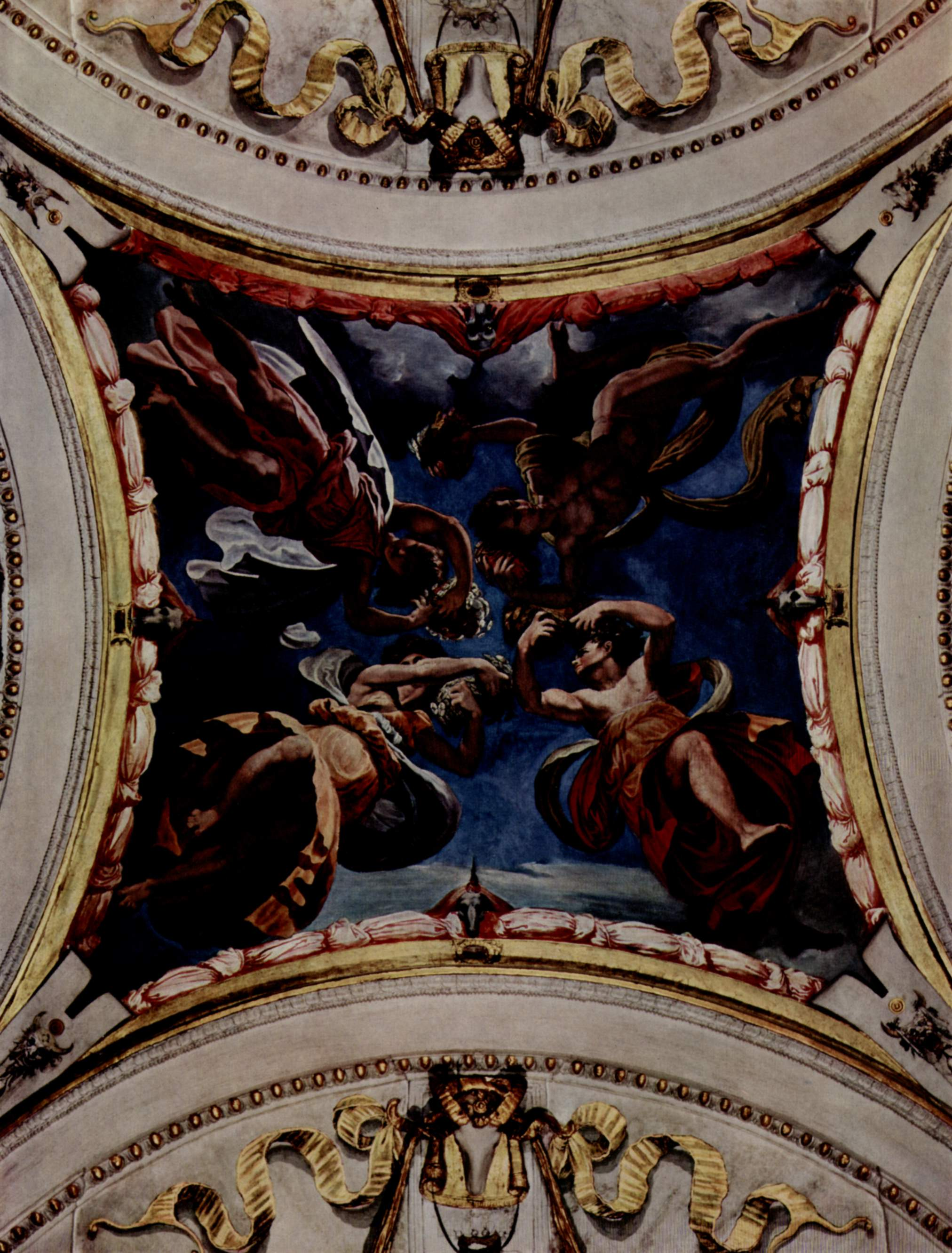
Pellegrino Tibaldi, Dance of the Genii, 1554–1556, Palazzo Poggi, Bologna

The Palazzo Sampieri frescoes are a set of paintings by Annibale, Agostino and Ludovico Carracci in the Palazzo Sampieri in Bologna. They form the last surviving collection of works by the three artists. The scheme was commissioned by Astorre Sampieri and features three large ceiling scenes and three scenes over fireplaces.

== History ==
The scheme was commissioned by Astorre Sampieri, young abbot of Santa Lucia di Roffeno, member of a powerful family which had been promoted to senatorial rank in 1590. He had arrived back in the city shortly before commissioning the work from the three artists, already noted for their Life of Aeneas and Lives of Jason and Medea frescoes at the Palazzo Fava and their Scenes from the Foundation of Rome frescoes at the Palazzo Magnani, both in Bologna. Those schemes were all friezes, but at the Palazzo Sampieri they planned three large ceiling scenes and three large scenes over fireplaces in each room. The reasons for this choice are unknown - Astore Sampieri may have wanted something different from the norm or the low rooms may simply not have lent themselves to friezes.

None of the three artists had previous experience of the "sottinsù" (upside-down) technique the scheme would require, but Annibale and Agostino had frequently seen and admired examples of it in palazzi and churches in Venice by artists such as Veronese and Tintoretto, artists personally known to Agostino. They also drew heavily on Pellegrino Tibaldi's mid 16th-century frescoes at Palazzo Poggi in Bologna, rare if not unique examples of "sottinsù", with his Dance of the Genii in a small room next to his better known Life of Ulysses cycle proving the Carraci's main reference point.

The Palazzo Sampieri frescoes are framed by ornate stucco cornices by the sculptor Gabriele Fiorini, a faithful collaborator who had already worked with the Carracci on other projects, particularly at the Palazzo Magnani. As well as the frescoes, the three painters produced three large over-door canvases, all showing Christ meeting women in the Gospels and all now in the Pinacoteca di Brera in Milan - Christ and the Samaritan Woman by Annibale, Christ and the Canaanite Woman by Ludovico and Christ and the Woman Taken in Adultery by Agostino.

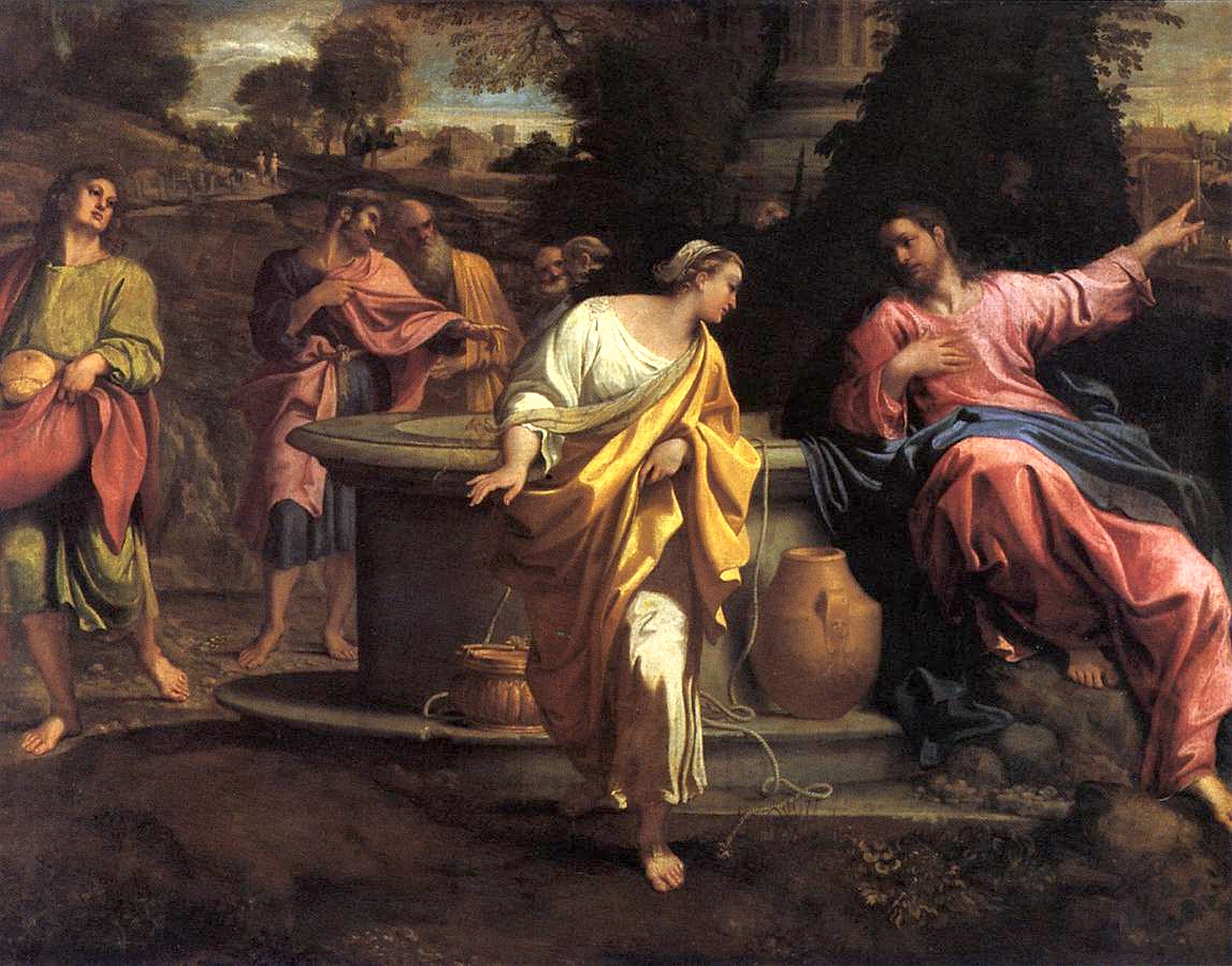
Annibale, Christ and the Samaritan Woman

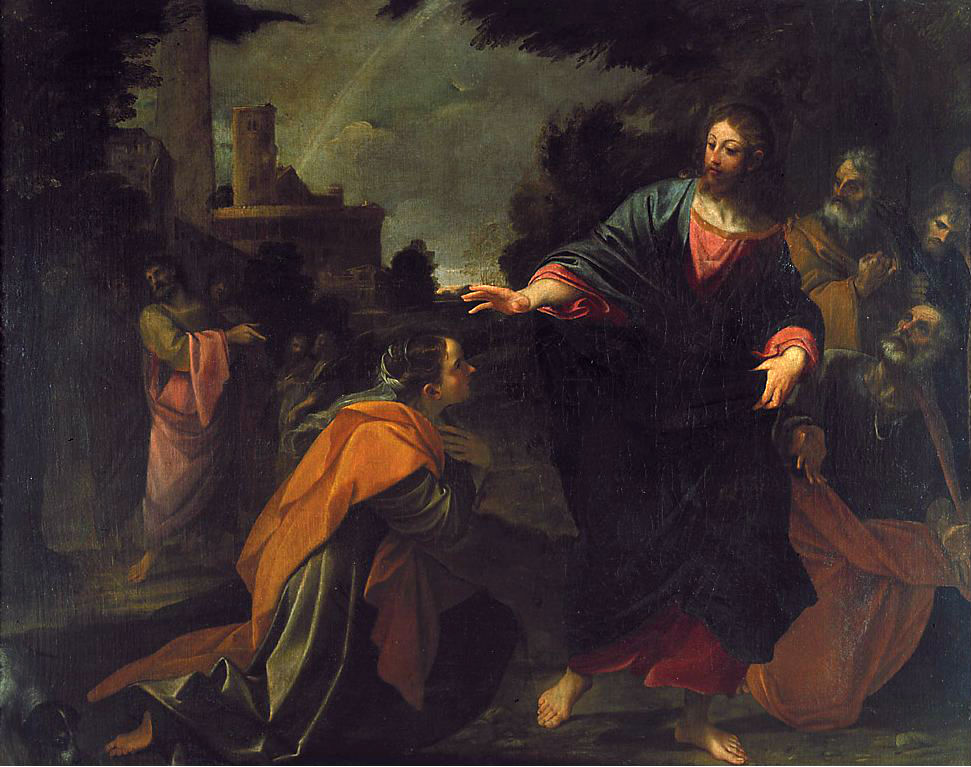
Ludovico, Christ and the Canaanite Woman

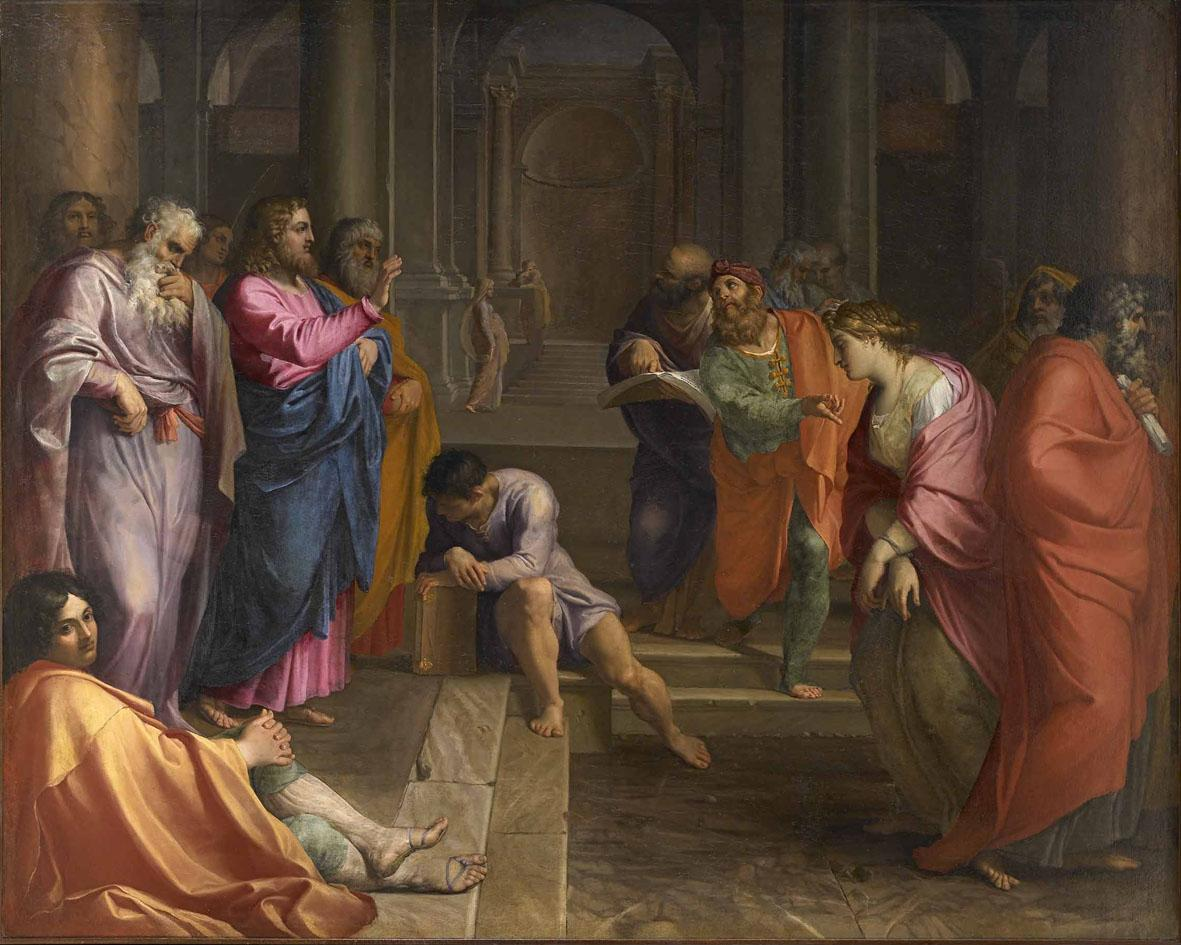
Agostino, Christ and the Woman Taken in Adultery

No sources or documents directly date the frescoes, though a 1595 print of Annibale's Christ and the Samaritan Woman by Francesco Brizio or a very young Guido Reni (British Museum) provides a terminus ante quem. In an early 20th century study the art historian Hans Tietze placed the completion of the whole decorative scheme to 1593–1594, just before the print, a conclusion backed in almost all later studies. This makes it the last surviving ceiling scheme on which the three artists collaborated, with Annibale moving to Rome just afterwards and staying there until his death, Agostino joining him just afterwards before moving to Parma, where he died, and Ludovico staying in Bologna and becoming head of its artistic milieu.

== Description ==
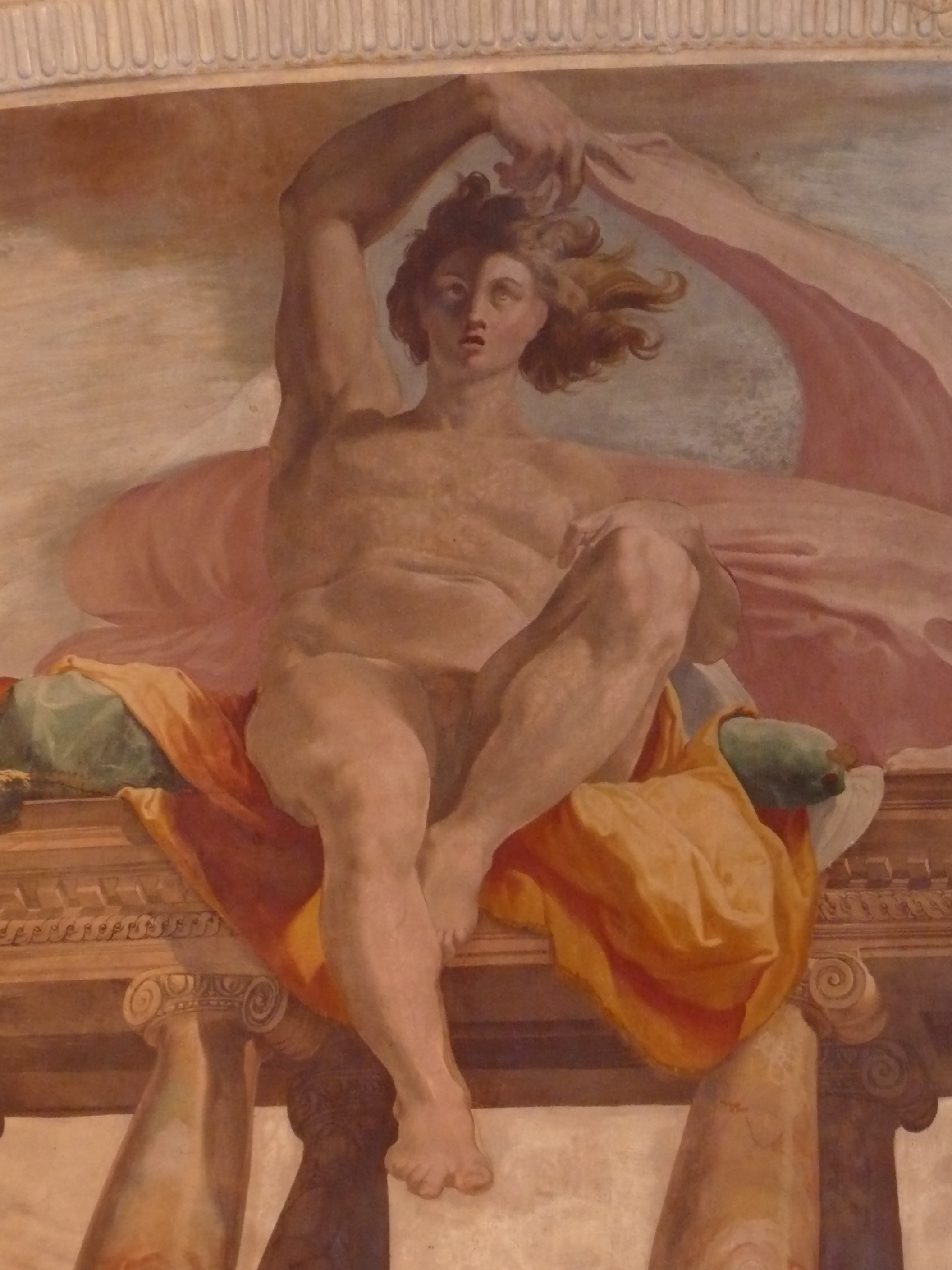
Pellegrino Tibaldi, Ignudo, (detail from Life of Ulysses), circa 1550, Palazzo Poggi, Bologna

=== Room 1 ===
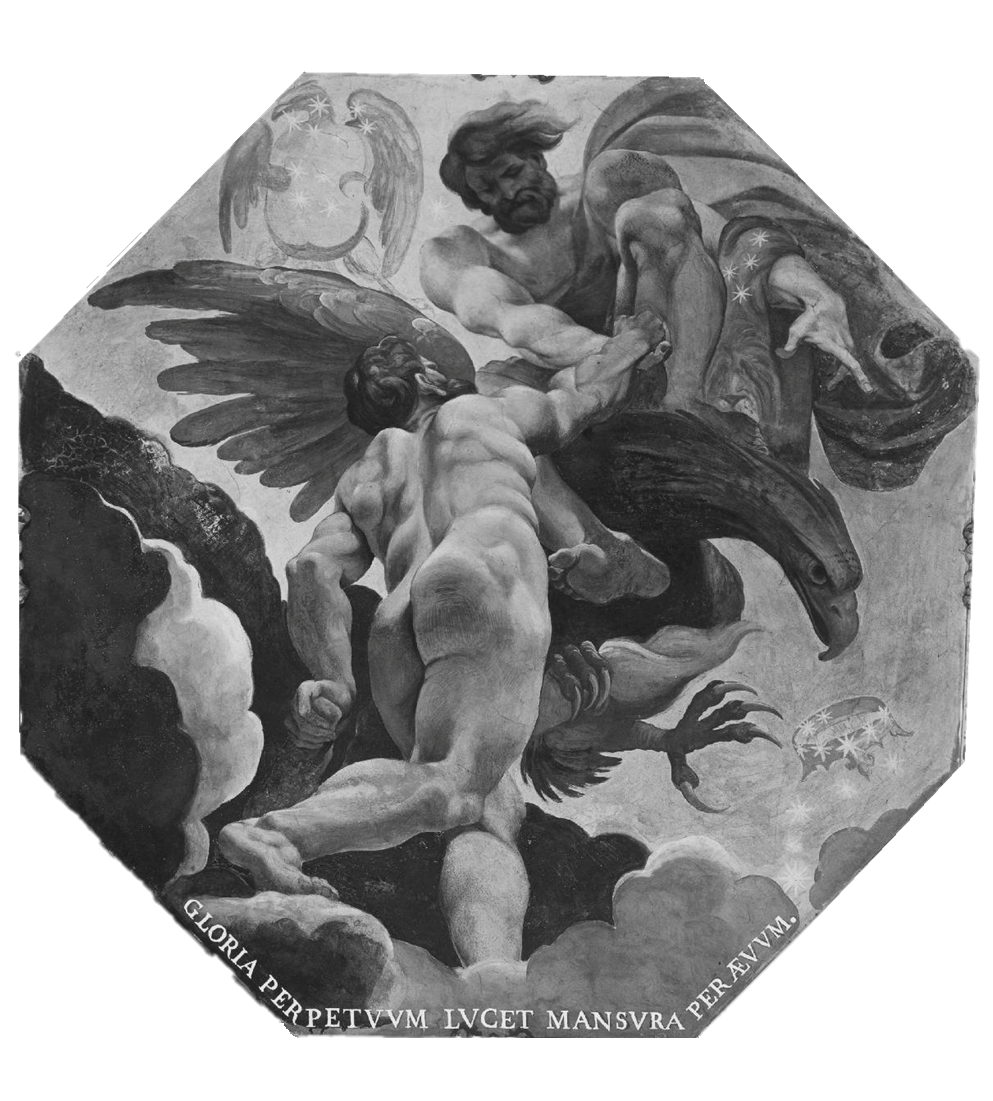
Ludovico Carracci, Jupiter Welcomes Hercules to Olympus (ceiling)

At the bottom is the Latin inscription "GLORIA PERPETUUM LUCET MANSURA PER ÆVUM", referring to the perpetual memory guaranteed by glory and thus to the immortality Hercules earned by his heroic deeds, which gained him entry to Olympus from Jupiter. It is taken almost word-for-word from the Culex, an epyllion in the Appendix Vergiliana.

=== Room 2 ===
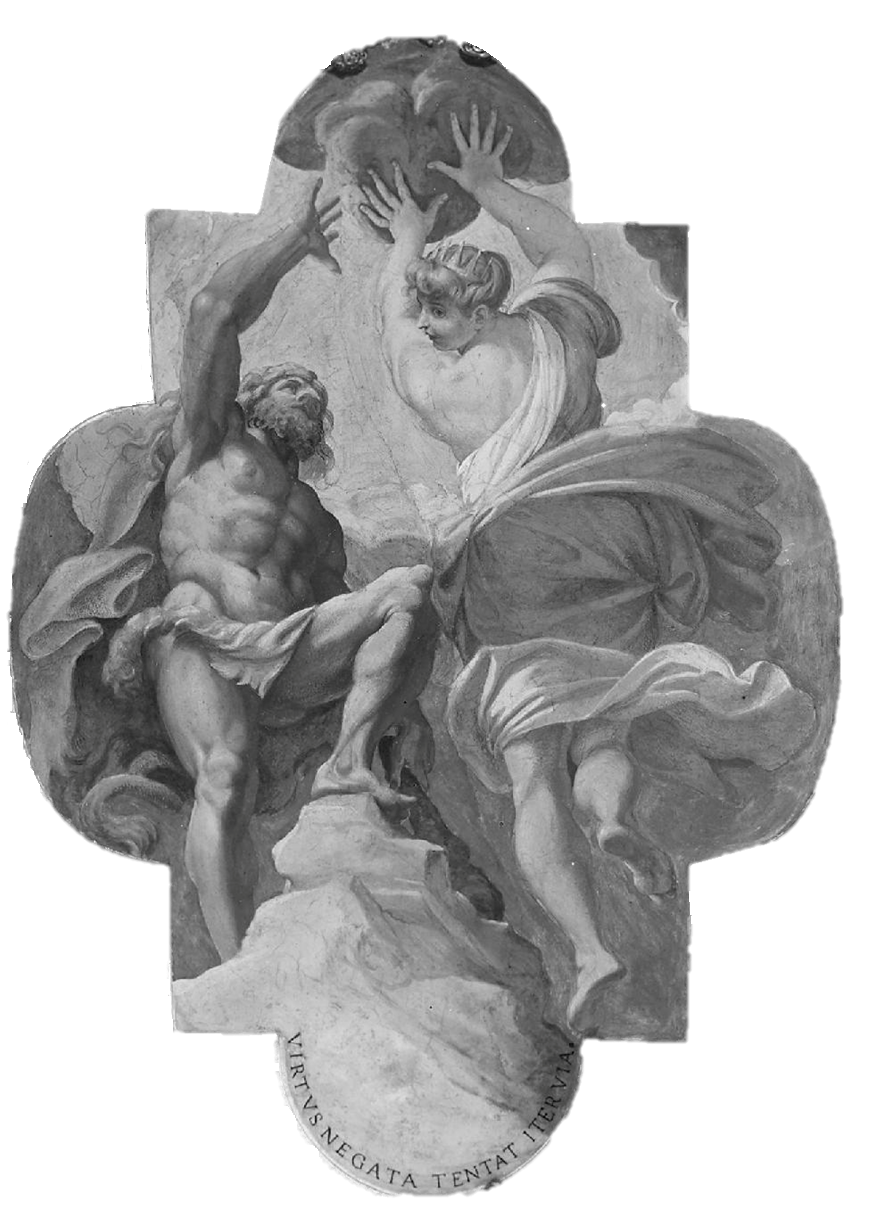
Annibale Carracci, Hercules Guided by Virtue (ceiling)

=== Room 3 ===
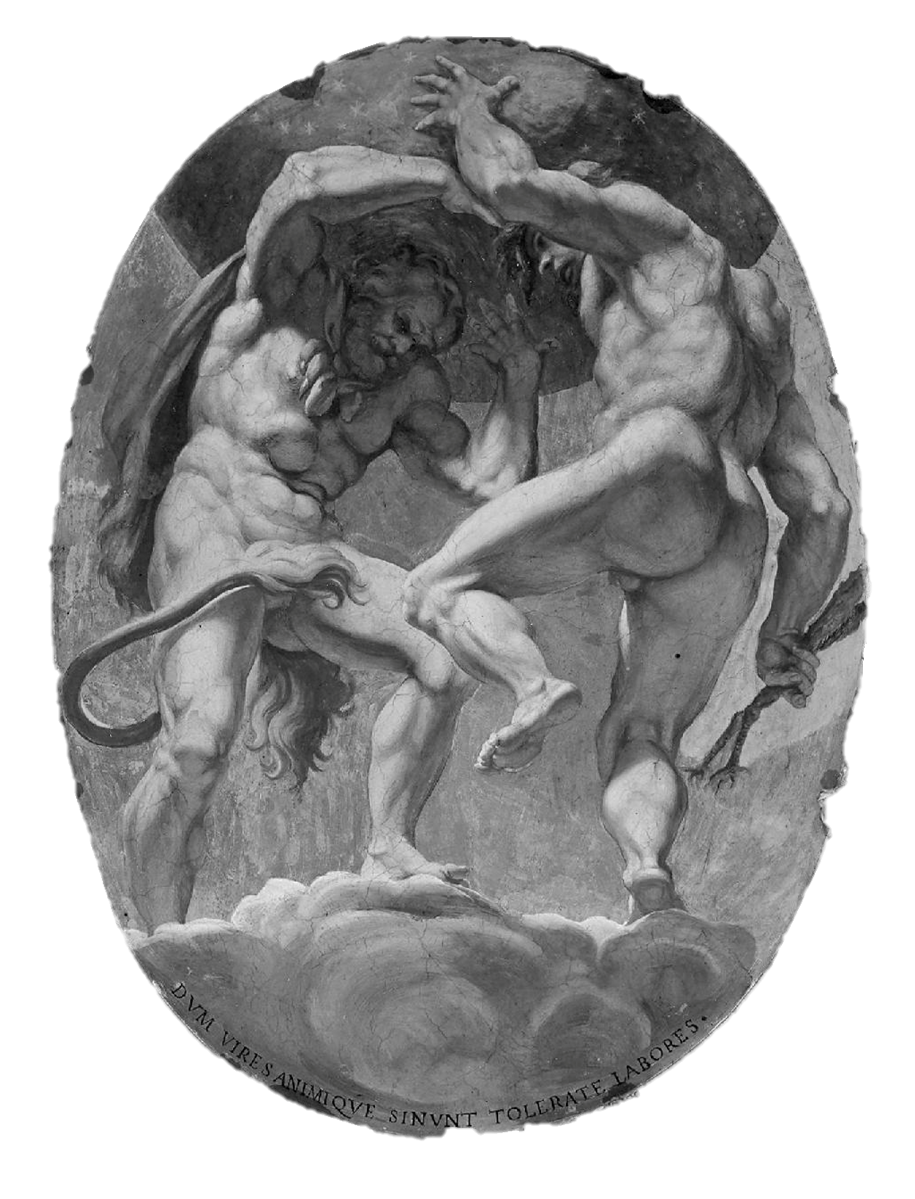
Agostino Carracci, Hercules Helps Atlas Hold Up the Celestial Vault (ceiling)

== Iconography ==
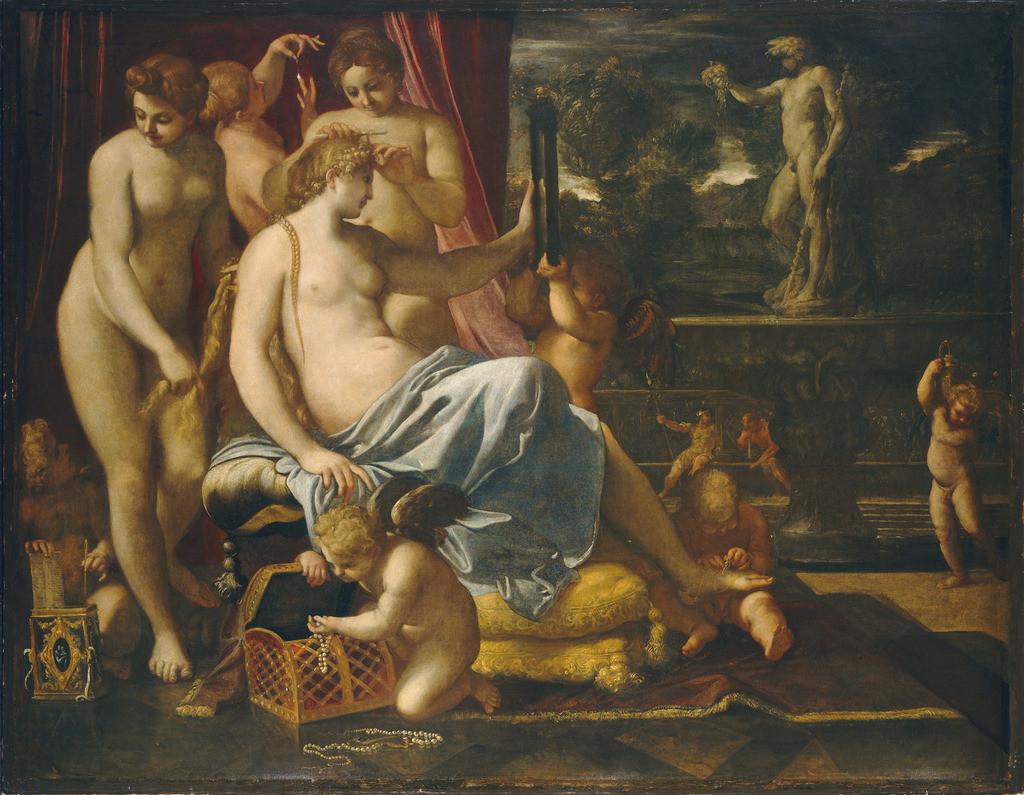
Annibale Carracci, Venus Dressed by the Graces, 1590–95, National Gallery of Art, Washington.

== Additions by Guercino ==
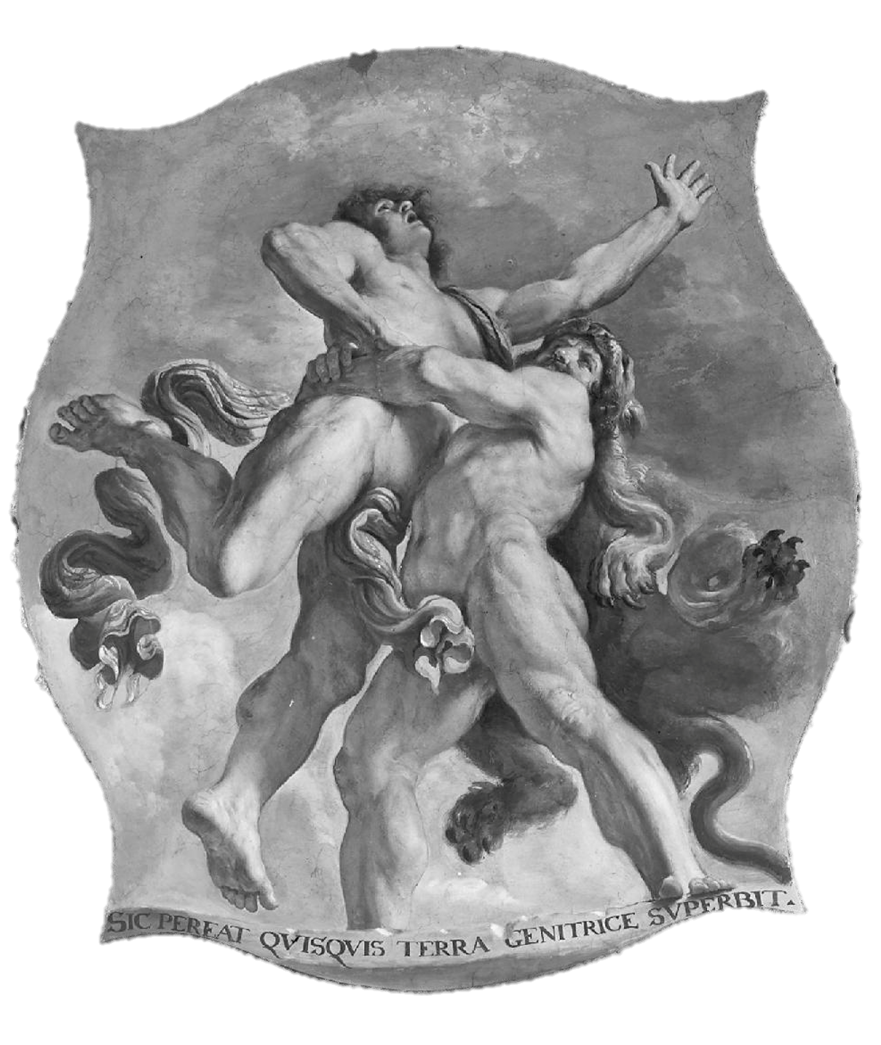
Guercino, Hercules and Antaeus

In 1631 Guercino was summoned to the Palazzo Sampieri to paint the ceilings of its last two rooms with more scenes from the life of Hercules, continuing the Carracci brothers' iconographic scheme with scenes of Hercules fighting Antaeus and Hercules strangling serpents as a baby. The latter scene was destroyed in 1876 during a failed attempt to remove it from the ceiling. Like the Carracci scenes, the works were accompanied by Latin summaries, SIC PEREAT QUISQUIS TERRA GENITRICE SUPERBIT for the Antaeus scene and ITER AD SUPEROS GLORIA PANDET for the lost baby scene.

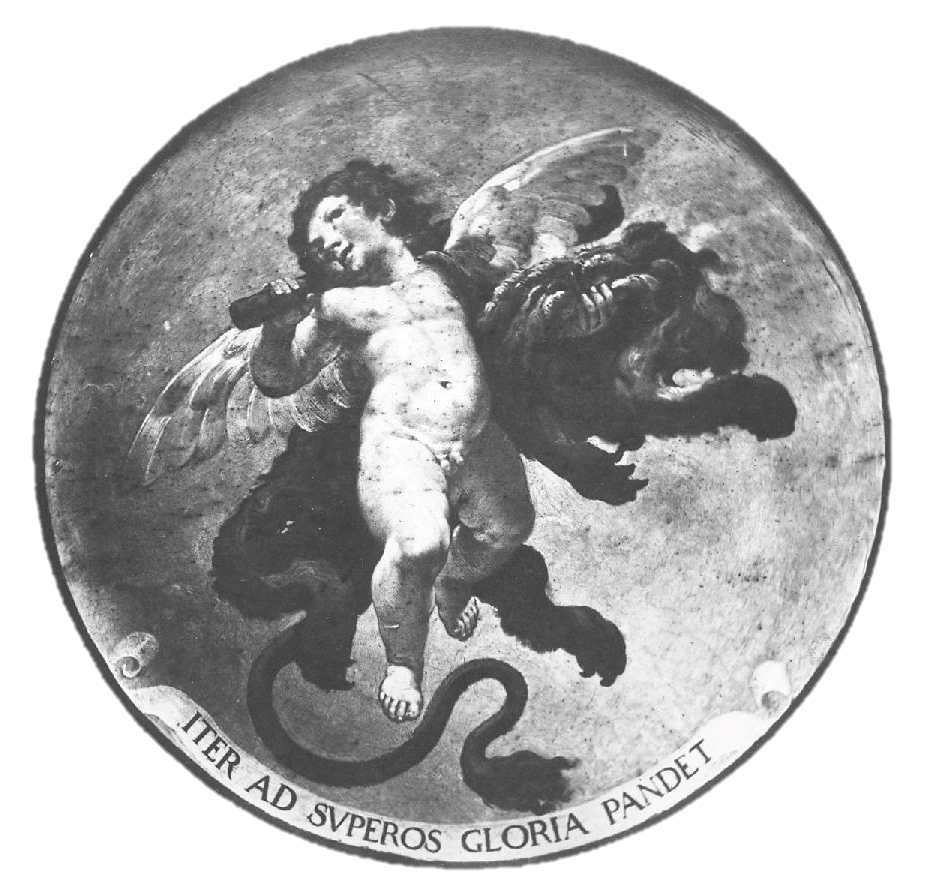
Guercino, Hercules as a Baby (destroyed)

== Bibliography ==
- (in Italian) Valeria Castelli, 'Ercole, Cerere e Proserpina nel ciclo decorativo di palazzo Sampieri-Talon a Bologna', in Figure, II, Bologna, 2014, pp. 33–46.
- (in Italian) Anna Stanzani, 'Annibale frescante a Bologna nei palazzi, Fava, Magnani e Sampieri', in D. Benati and E. Ricomini (ed.s), Annibale Carracci, Catalogo della mostra Bologna e Roma 2006-2007, Electa, Milano, 2006.
- (in Italian) Eugenio Riccomini, L'Ercole trionfante. I tre Carracci a Casa Sampieri, Edizioni Minerva, Bologna, 2006.
- Anton W. A. Boschloo, Annibale Carracci in Bologna: visible reality in art after the Council of Trent, Kunsthistorische studien van het Nederlands Instituut te Rome, L'Aia, 1974.
- Michael Jaffé, 'Some drawings by Annibale and by Agostino Carracci', in Paragone, VII.83, Firenze, 1956, pp. 12–16.
