= The Entombment of Christ (Titian) =

c. 1520 painting by Titian

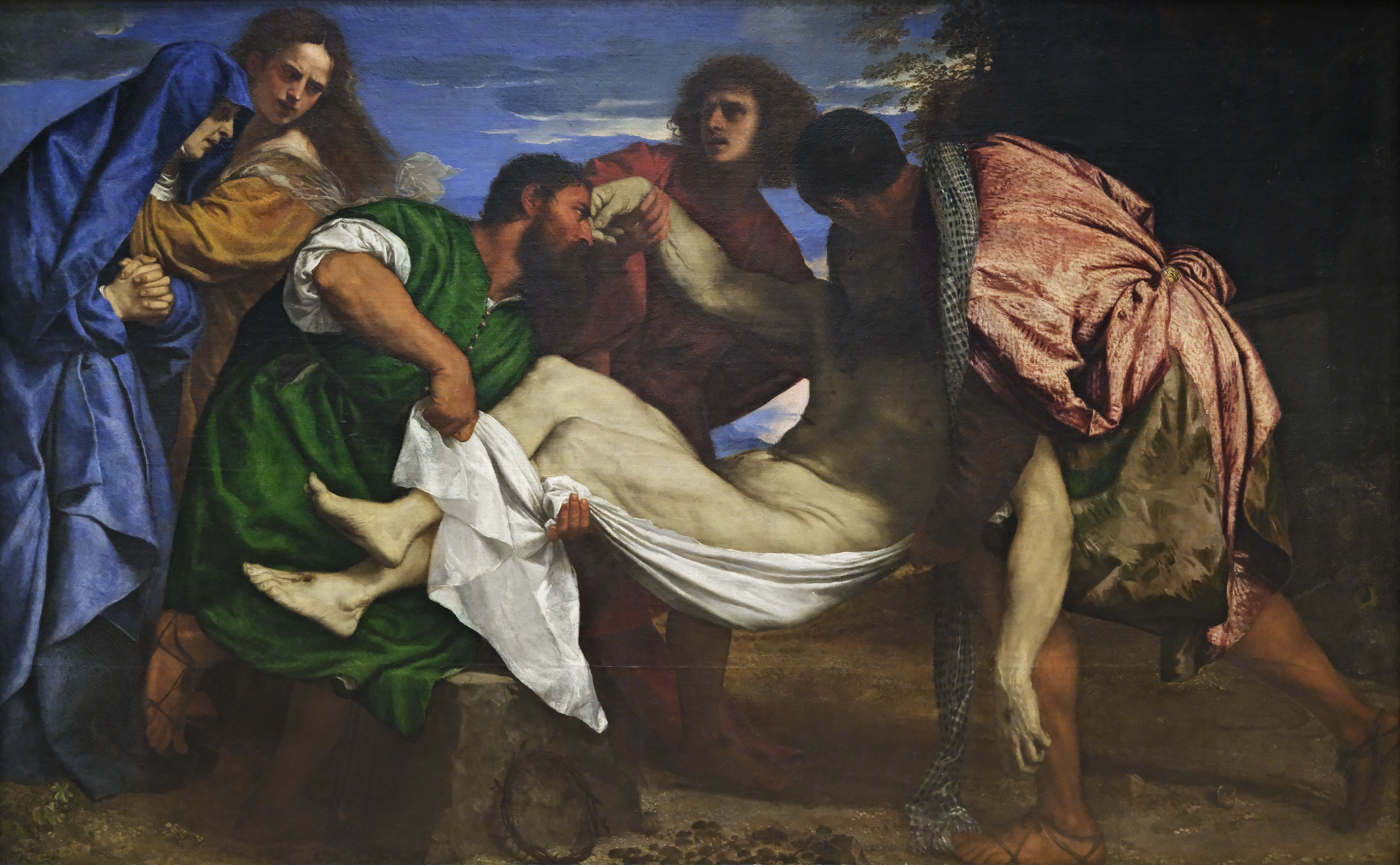
- Artist: Titian
- Year: c. 1520
- Medium: Oil on canvas
- Dimensions: 148 cm × 212 cm (58 in × 83 in)
- Location: Musée du Louvre, Paris

The Entombment of Christ is a c. 1520 painting by Titian, now in the Musée du Louvre, in Paris.

== History ==
The work was once in the collection of the Gonzaga family, before it was bought in 1627 by Charles I of England. When Charles died, his art was put up for auction by Oliver Cromwell. The Entombment, in particular, was bought by the Parisian banker Jabach and subsequently by Louis XIV in 1662.

Critics have traditionally dated the work to around 1525, since it isn't mentioned in any documents before that time. Assuming it was commissioned by the Gonzagas, the canvas is not mentioned in their letters so it's not traceable to either Isabella d'Este or Federico II Gonzaga. It is believed to be one of the first works commissioned by the Gonzagas from Titian. On February 2, 1523, Federico II wrote to his uncle Alfonso I d'Este to free Titian from any artistic assignments in Ferrara.

There is a copy of The Entombment produced afterwards, perhaps signed by Titian, in the Torrigiani family collection.

== Description and style ==
The dead Christ is carried to his tomb by three men. Nicodemus holds his shoulders, Joseph of Arimathea his legs, and John the Apostle his arms. Behind them at left, the Virgin Mary is also present, grieving and supported by Mary Magdalene.

The work has a triangular composition that emphasizes the weight of the dead body. Titian also used the direction of light to show the dynamic movement of the body being carried to the right. The contrast of lights and darks concentrates on the body of Christ, the fulcrum of the composition. The viewer's eyes are drawn by the stained light of his legs and shroud and then towards his upper body, which lies in shadow. The shadows anticipate the darkness of the tomb and serve as a symbol for the painting's theme of death.

Despite the tragedy it depicts, The Entombment demonstrates the spontaneity and fluidity of classic bas-reliefs. For this quality, the painting can also be compared to the works on this theme by the painters Pontormo and Rosso Fiorentino, who also emphasized the classical features of Titian's painting.

== See also ==
- List of works by Titian

== Bibliography ==
- Valcanover, Francesco (1969). L'opera completa di Tiziano (in Italian). Milan: Rizzoli.
- Zuffi, Stefano (2008). Tiziano (in Italian) (Nuova ed.). Milano: Mondadori arte. ISBN 978-88-370-6436-5.
- Kaminski, Marion (2000). Tiziano: 1488/1490-1576 (in German). Köln: Könemann. ISBN 3-8290-4553-0.
