= A Blonde Woman =

C. 1520 oil painting by Palma Vecchio

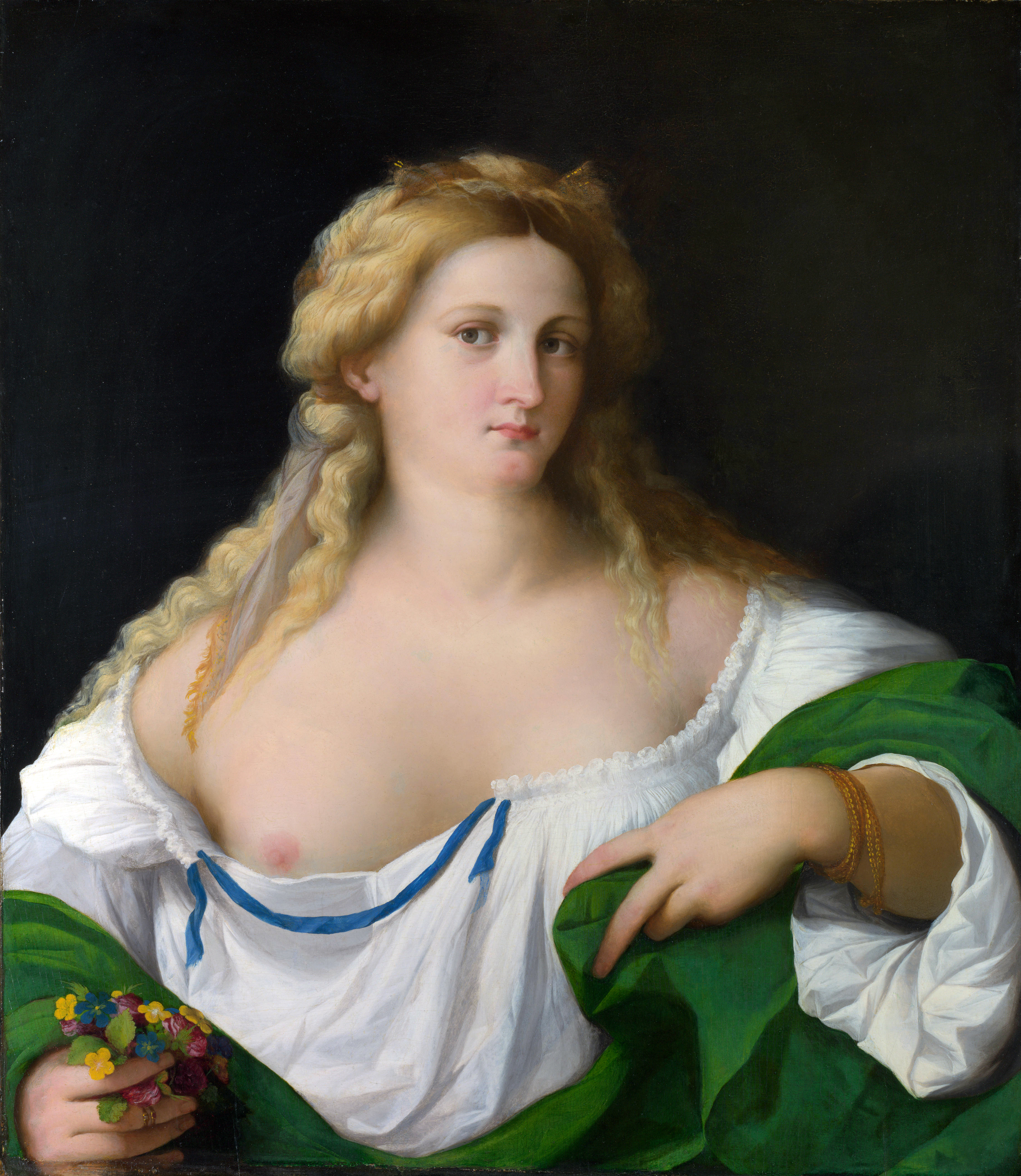
A Blonde Woman (Flora)

A Blonde Woman, also called Flora, is an oil painting by Palma Vecchio, dated today to around 1520, but undocumented before 1870, in the collection of the National Gallery, London.

This half-length depiction of a woman in loosened white chemise with a dark green mantle, holding some flowers, has been interpreted as an idealised representation of female beauty (sometimes in connection with the Roman goddess Flora), and as an actual portrait of either a gentlewoman or a courtesan.

== Description ==
The picture was painted in oils on a wood panel measuring 77.5 cm by 64.1 cm (2 ft 6½ in by 2 ft 3¾ in); a strip 2.54 cm (1 in) high has been added along the top of the panel, lengthening it. It is in very good condition, with most of the repainting concentrated in the side of the face and hair which is cast in shadow.

The subject is a young woman with fair skin and blonde carefully tended silken hair sweeping about her shoulders, who shows much décolletée; her white chemise or camicia is unfastened and slipping off her shoulder, baring her right breast and nipple, and there is a little piece of narrow blue ribbon, designed to fasten the chemise. In her right hand is a small bunch of colourful spring flowers.

== Date ==
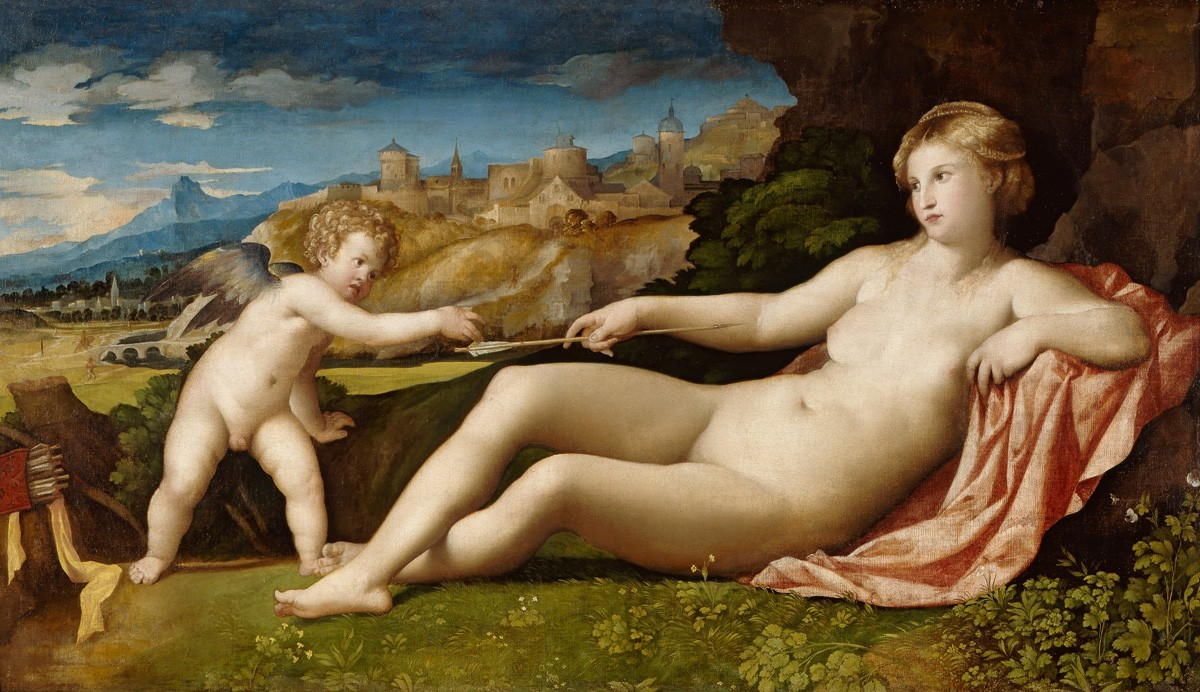
Venus and Cupid in a Landscape, c. 1522–3

By comparing Palma's treatment of the girl's coiffure with similar styles in pictures by contemporary Venetian artists, such as Lorenzo Lotto, the picture has been dated to about 1520. Richter (1910) thinks the picture representative of Palma's work during the previous decade, from 1510 to 1520, and allied in composition with the "beautiful series of portraits" now preserved in the Gallery of Vienna. The work has been compared to Palma's Sibyl, which is also dated to the 1520s. In Palma's Venus and Cupid in a Landscape, dated by the Fitzwilliam Museum to about 1523 or 1524, Venus has the same dimpled chin, and other facial features, as the girl in this painting.

== Analysis ==
Palma Vecchio is known mainly for religious scenes and portraits of women, and Gould (1975) thinks this example of the latter group characteristic of his style. The subject is a young woman of that "opulent voluptuous type" which was much admired in Venice at the beginning of the sixteenth century, and was represented in works by Titian, Palma, Lorenzo Lotto, Bonifazio Veronese, Paris Bordone, and others. The character of these works is disputed, as to whether the women represented are simply ideals of female beauty created by the artist, or portraits of actually existing beauties, and, if portraits, of whom.

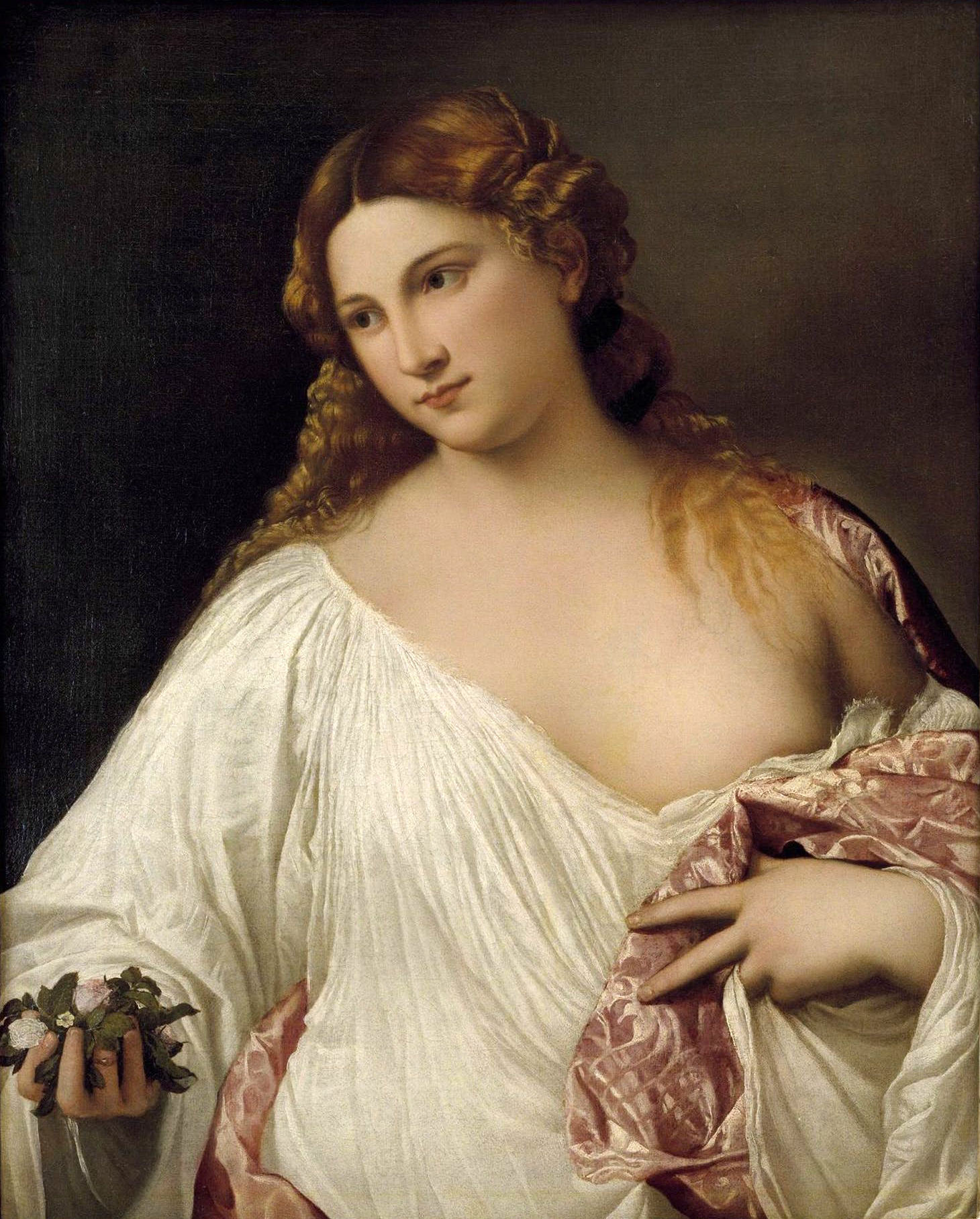
Titian's Flora, c. 1515 (Uffizi)

In the National Gallery catalogues, this picture was formerly titled Flora, after the ancient Roman goddess of spring and flowers. Certain particularities of the composition, such as the small posy of forget-me-nots, buttercups (or wall-flowers) and primroses held in the subject's right hand, and the erotic suggestion of the loosened chemise, have drawn comparison with Titian's earlier painting of the same name. Richter writes of the "cold whiteness" of the chemise which has fallen away from the shoulders, "like the discarded sheath of an opening flower". Gould thinks the influence of Titian likely, though unprovable given the dearth of primary sources for the picture.

The identity of the sitter is unknown, and according to Gould impossible to determine given the "summary treatment of the features". Richter, conversely, describes Palma's "carefully individualised heads" of women as portraits. Palma painted a number of similar half-lengths of (real or ideal) beauties, and the type became one of his specialities. Such eroticised images, never intended for public exhibition, were for a clientele of wealthy male collectors and hung in private apartments. There is also evidence that some successful courtesans and mistresses bought and owned alluring portraits of themselves to advertise their charms. Portraits of such well-known women were ordered by their lovers and admirers, who were sometimes even pictured with them. (Note: Compare, for example, Laura Dianti, the Woman with a Mirror, by Titian, in the Louvre, and similar pictures by Paris Bordone in the Brera and elsewhere.)

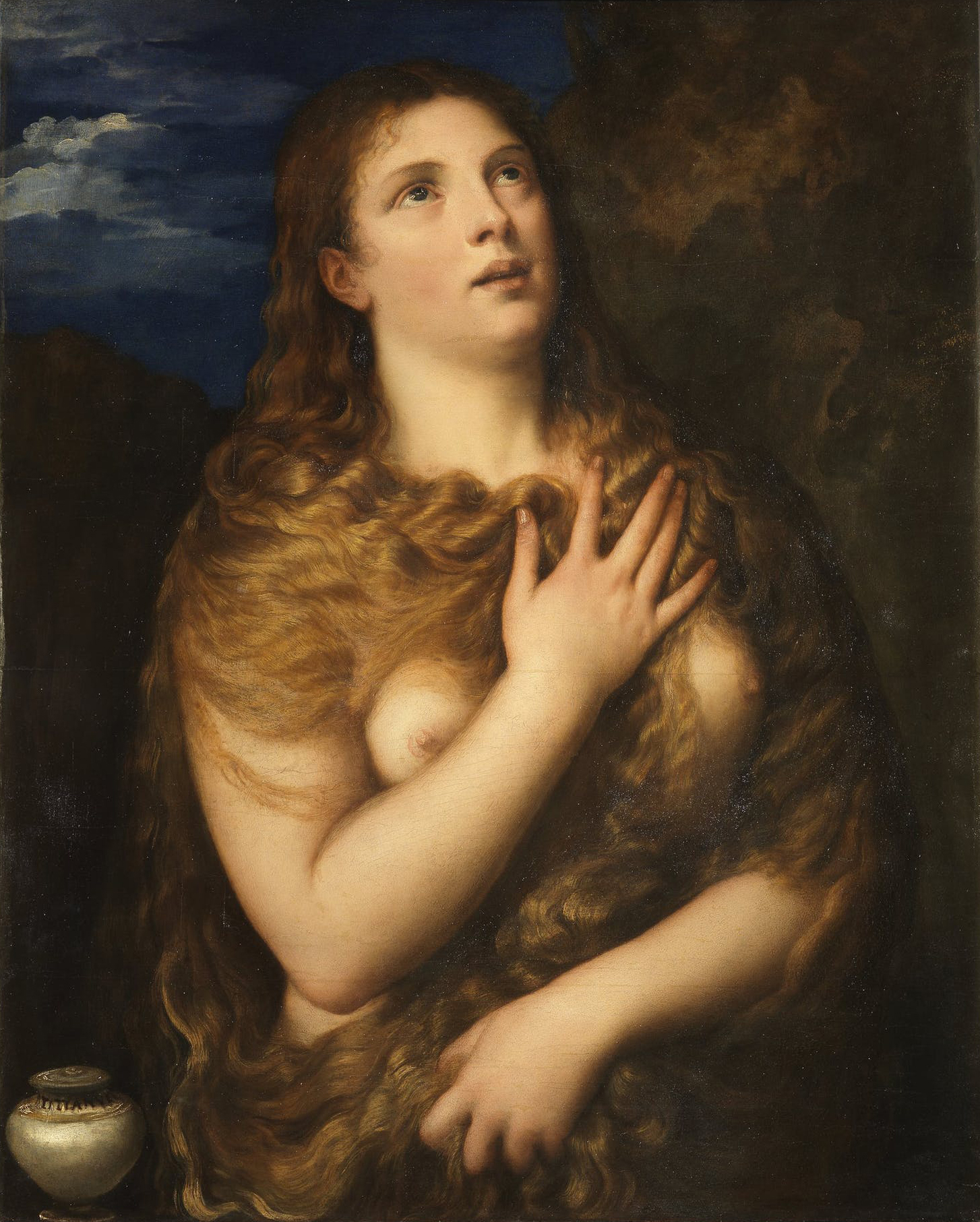
Titian's Penitent Magdalene, c. 1531 (Palazzo Pitti)

Phillips (1897) writes of "the exquisite, golden blond courtezans—or, if you will, models—who constantly appear and reappear in this period of Venetian art". The connection to prostitution extends to the name Flora, which was an alias of prostitutes in Italy from Roman times. Collier-Frick (1987) thinks the girl's long, loose and flowing tresses, typical of this type of picture, an allusion to the iconography of Mary Magdalene, patron saint of prostitutes, whose promiscuous past was symbolised by her luxurious hair; while Mellencamp (1969) sees a classical reference to the hair-down nymphs.

Richter argues that some of Palma's pictures of young women may depict courtesans, but that they may equally often be portraits of great ladies, gentlewomen, and young brides whose husbands were simply proud of their beauty. (Note: Richter therefore titles this picture Portrait of a Lady.) Burckhardt (1859) had earlier conjectured that Titian's Flora is shown in her "engagement" gown, but Mellencamp disputes this idea, citing the camicia (a blousy undergarment) and uncovered breast as improbable elements in a Renaissance marriage portrait.

== Provenance ==
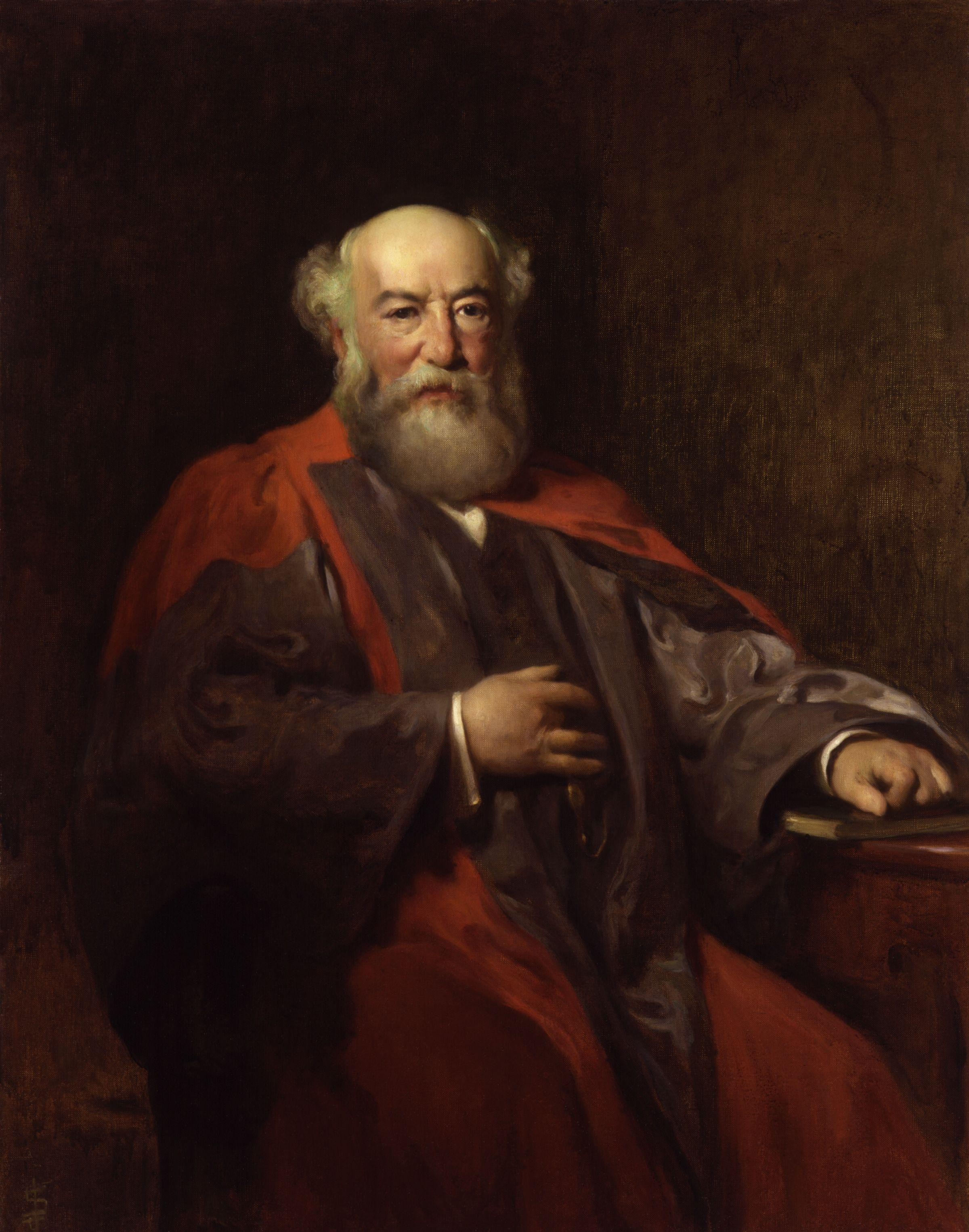
Dr Ludwig Mond, who bequeathed the picture to the British nation in 1909

Palma never signed or dated any of his canvases, and although this one is to-day attributed to him based on the style and handling of the composition, the documentation of the picture is completely lacking before 1870. On 30 April 1870 it was auctioned by Christie's as lot 53 of the William Delafield sale, with an attribution to Paris Bordone. The picture was bought from a Dr Becci in Florence, who had acquired it some time before in England, and was firmly convinced that it was by Leonardo da Vinci. It had previously belonged to a Mr Delafield. It was acquired by Ludwig Mond in 1889, who, just before his death in 1909, bequeathed it, along with the most of his collection of Old Master pictures, to the National Gallery, pending the death of his widow, Frida Mond, who lived until 1923. In 1924, after settling a legal dispute with the family, the National Gallery acquired the picture (accession number NG3939) through the Mond bequest.

Three copies or versions of the composition have between recorded:

1. Formerly in the collection of the Duke of Northumberland at Syon House, auctioned by Sotheby's on 26 March 1952 as lot 109.
2. From an anonymous sale, auctioned by Sotheby's on 12 December 1954 as lot 62.
3. Sold at Cologne in 1904. The sitter is described as wearing pearls.

== Allusions ==
- In his 1969 novel Ada or Ardor: A Family Chronicle, Vladimir Nabokov refers to this picture ("a Venetian blonde") and the painter ("a drunken Palma Vecchio").

== Related works ==
Titian: Woman with a Mirror, c. 1515

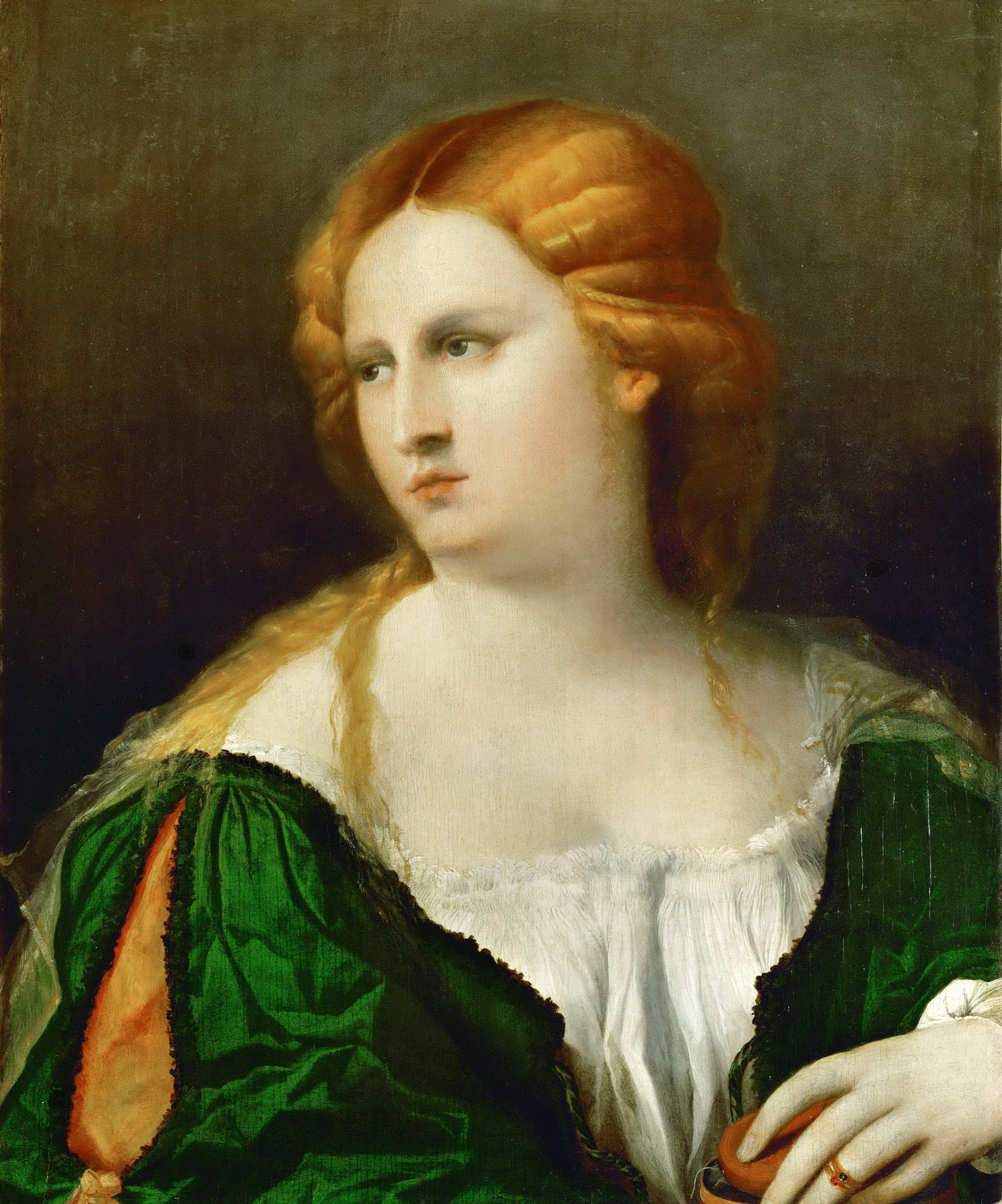
Palma: Young Woman in a Green Dress, c. 1512–1514

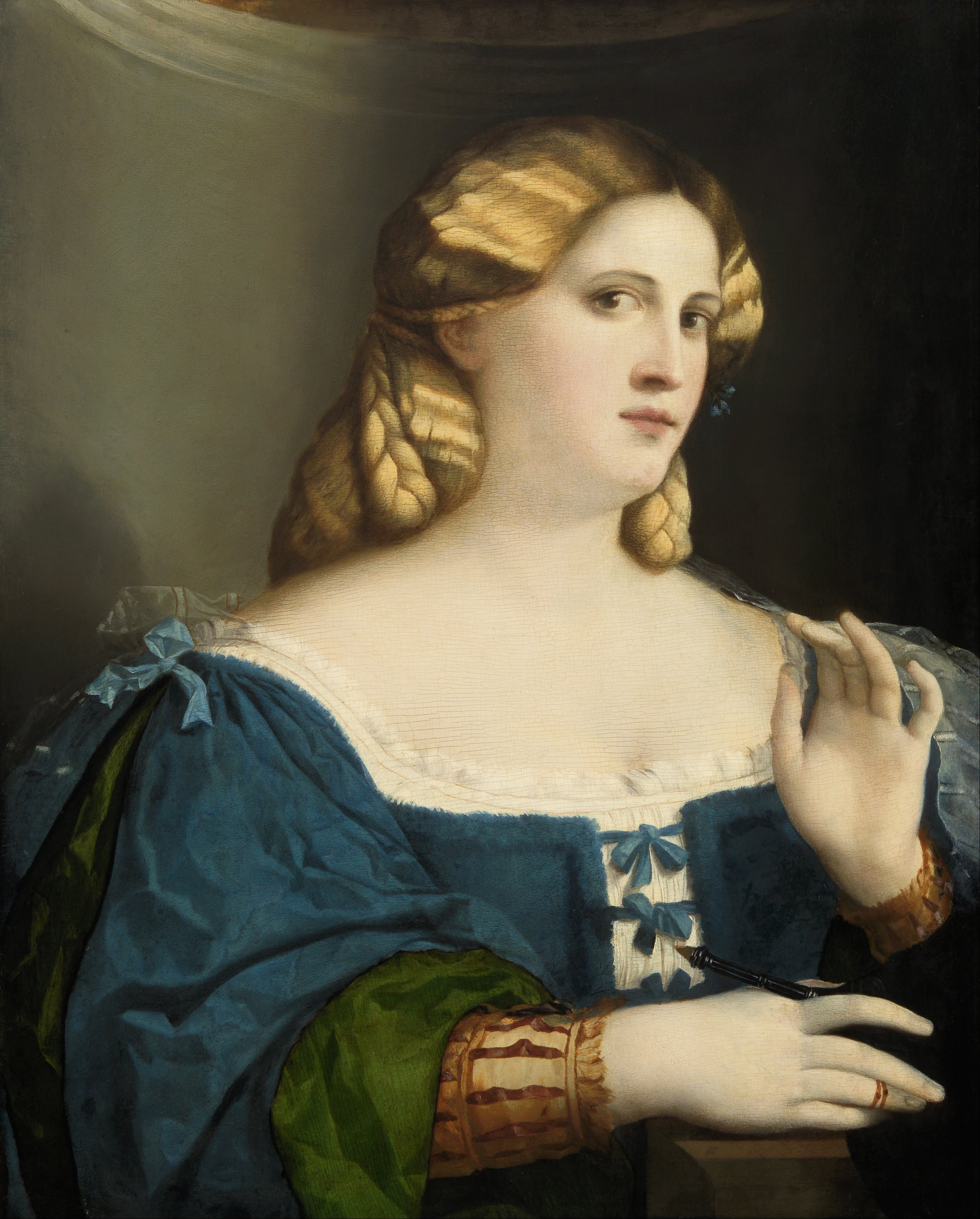
Palma: Young Woman in a Blue Dress, with Fan, c. 1512–1514

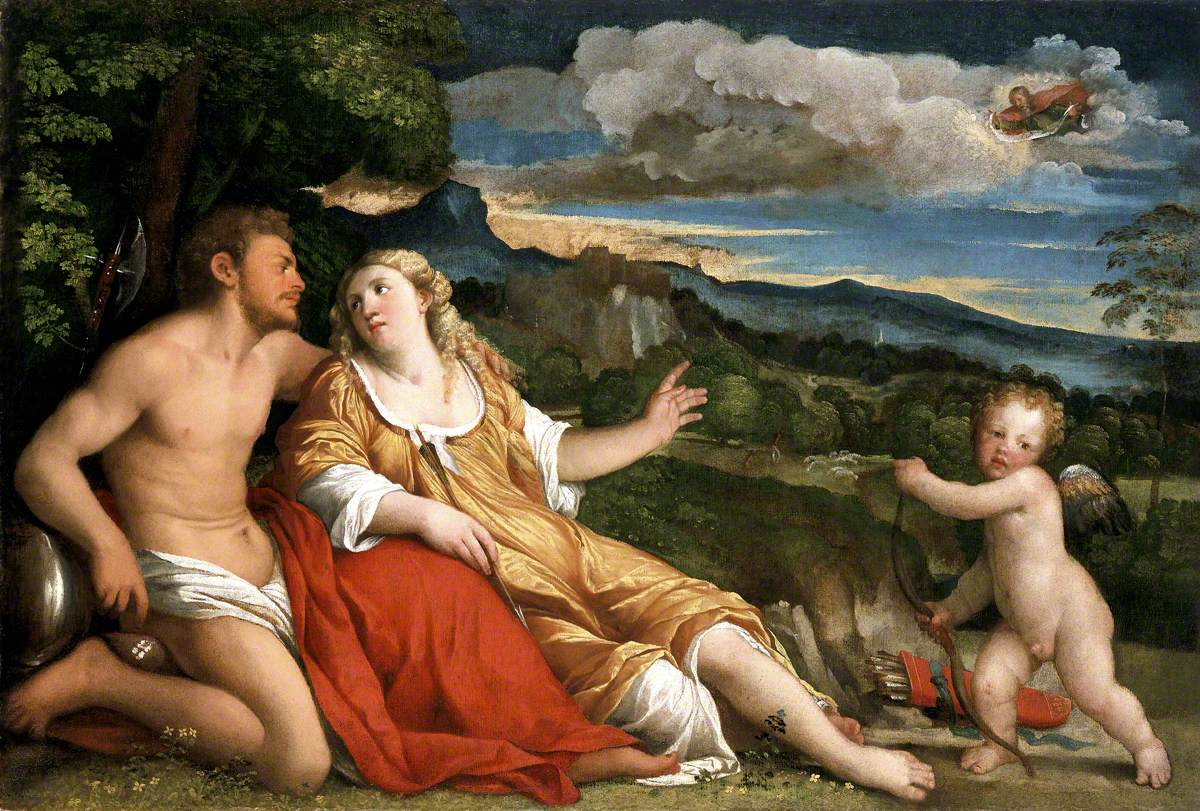
Palma: Mars, Venus and Cupid, c. 1520

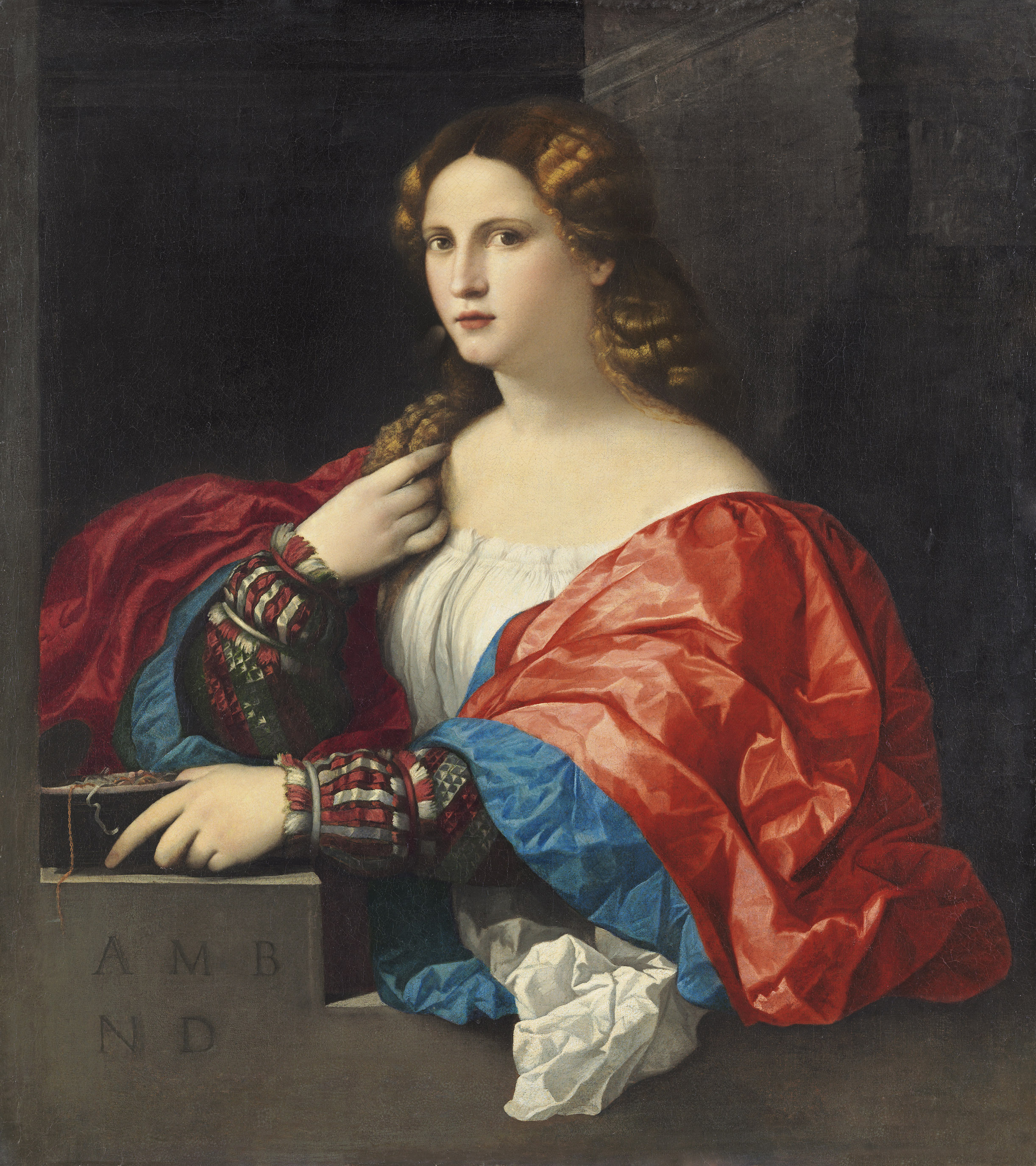
Palma: "La Bella", c. 1518–1520

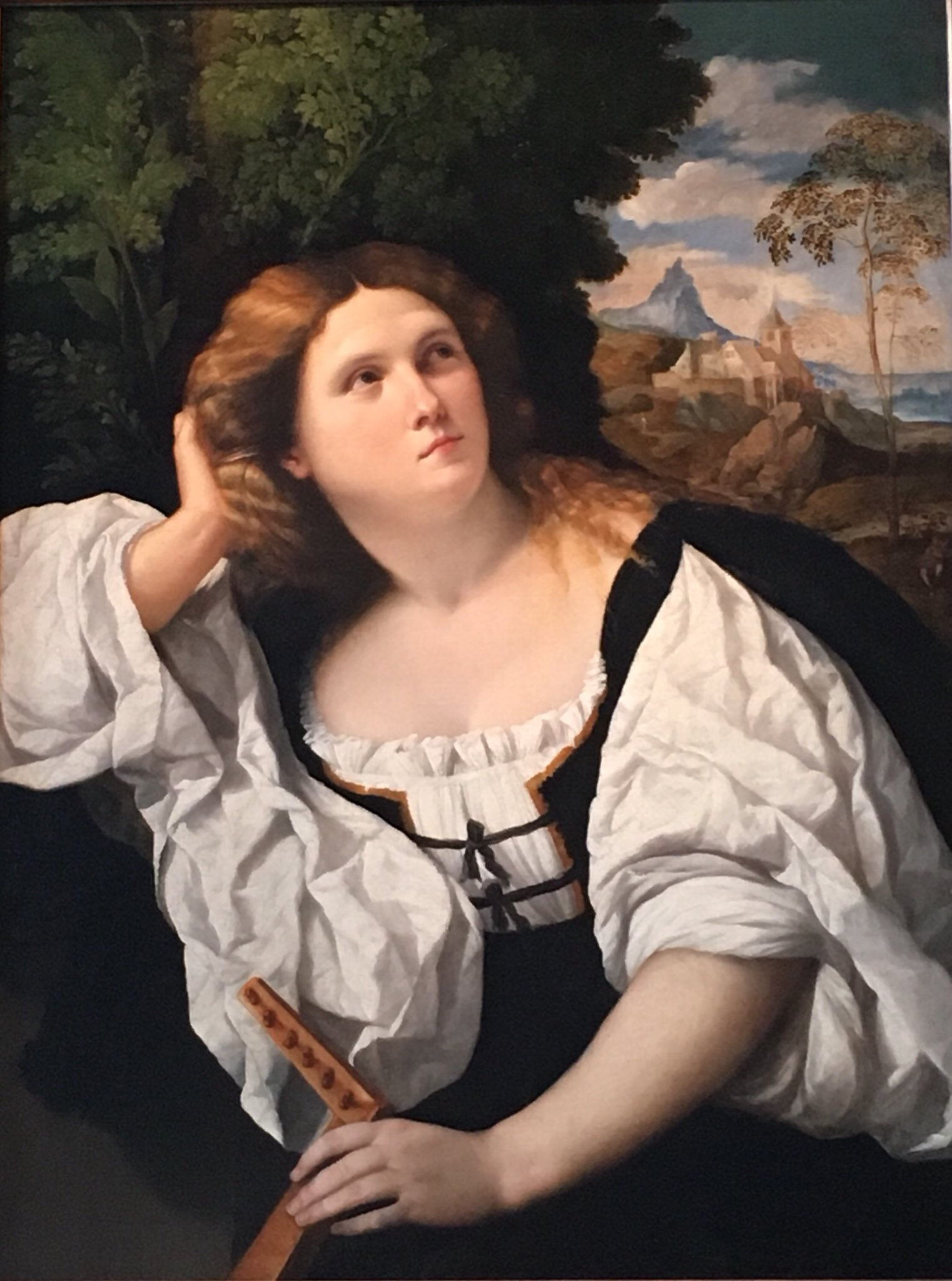
Palma: Lady with a Lute, c. 1520

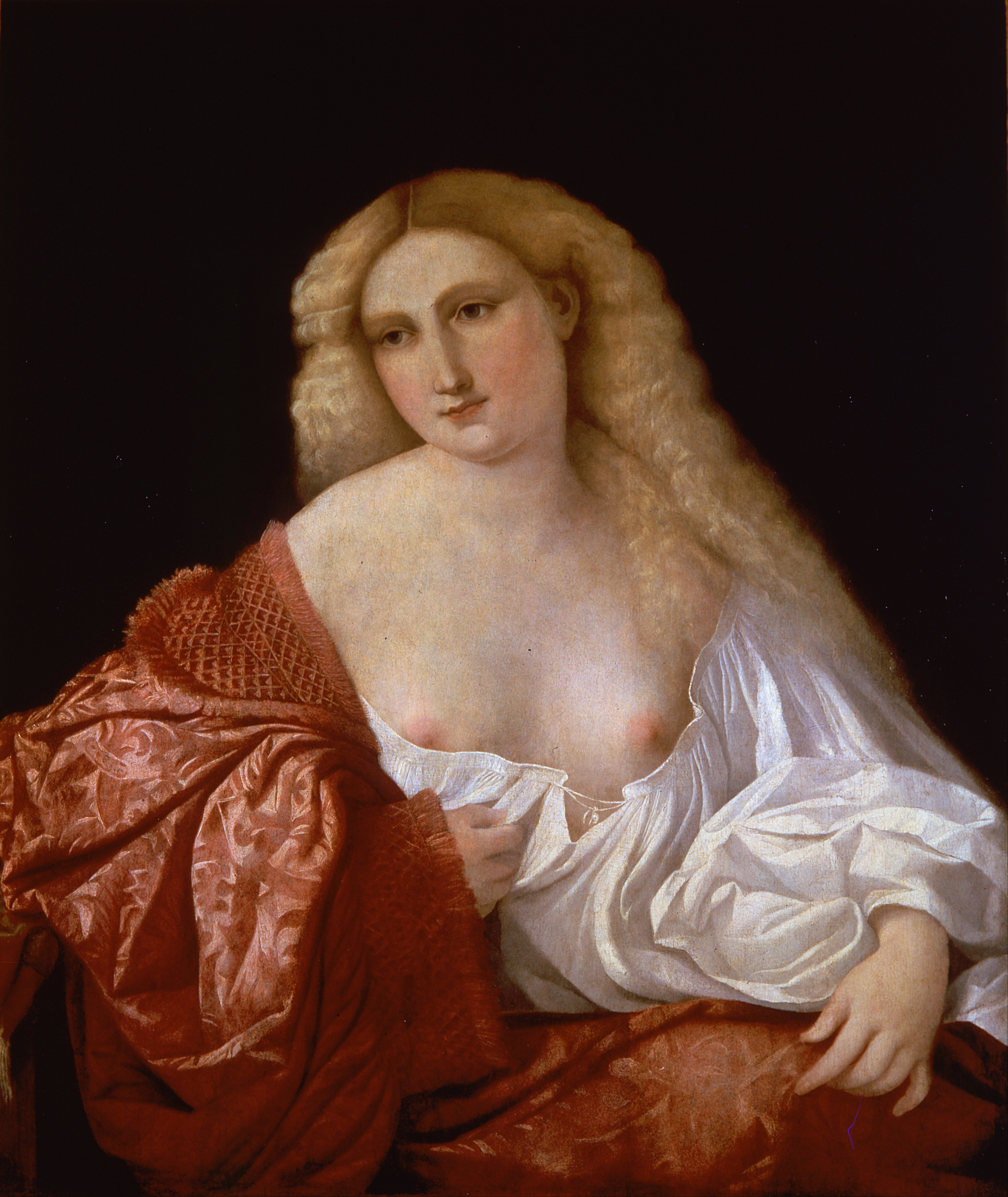
Palma: A Courtesan, c. 1520

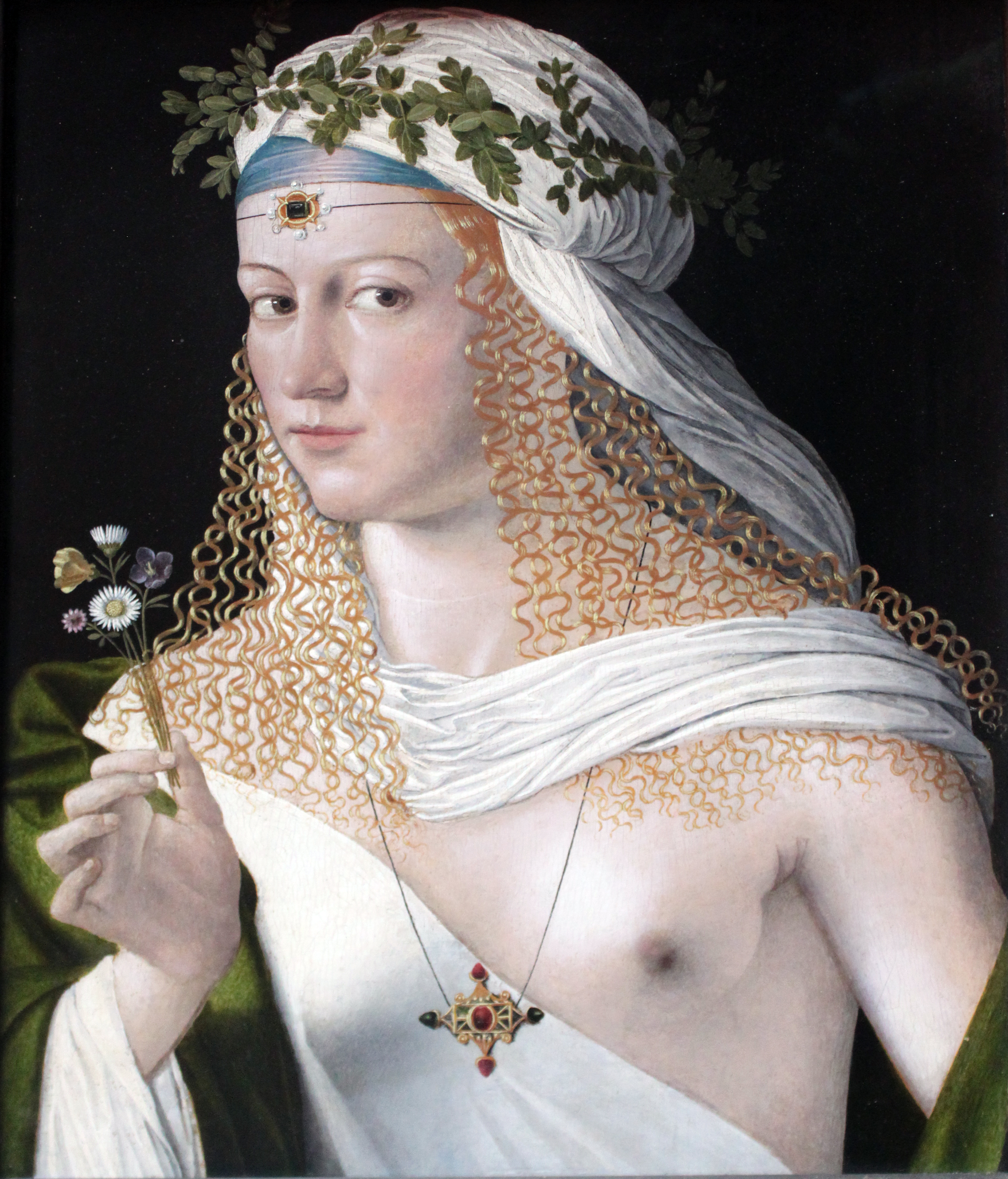
Bartolomeo Veneto: Young Lady as Flora, c. 1520

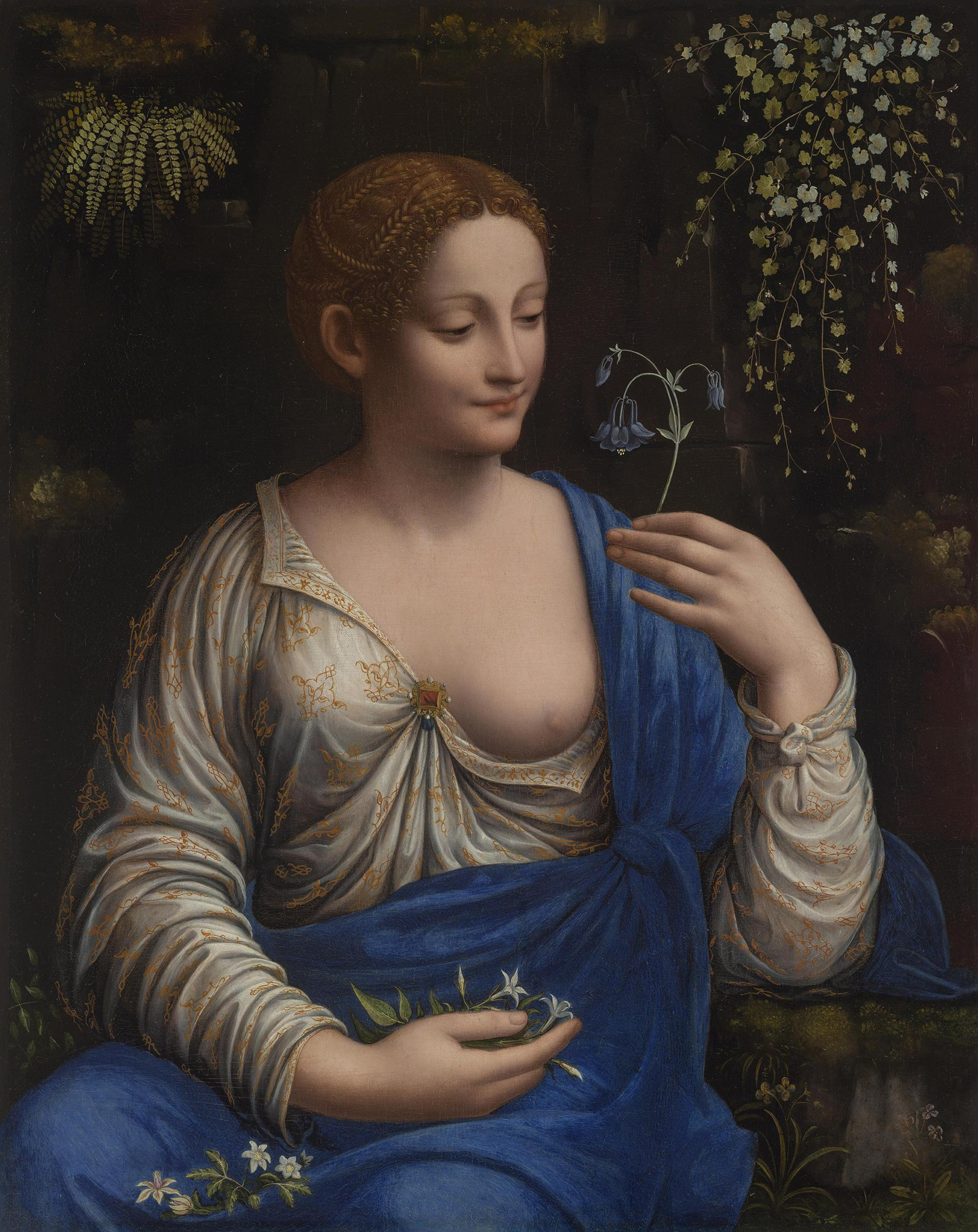
Melzi: Flora, c. 1520

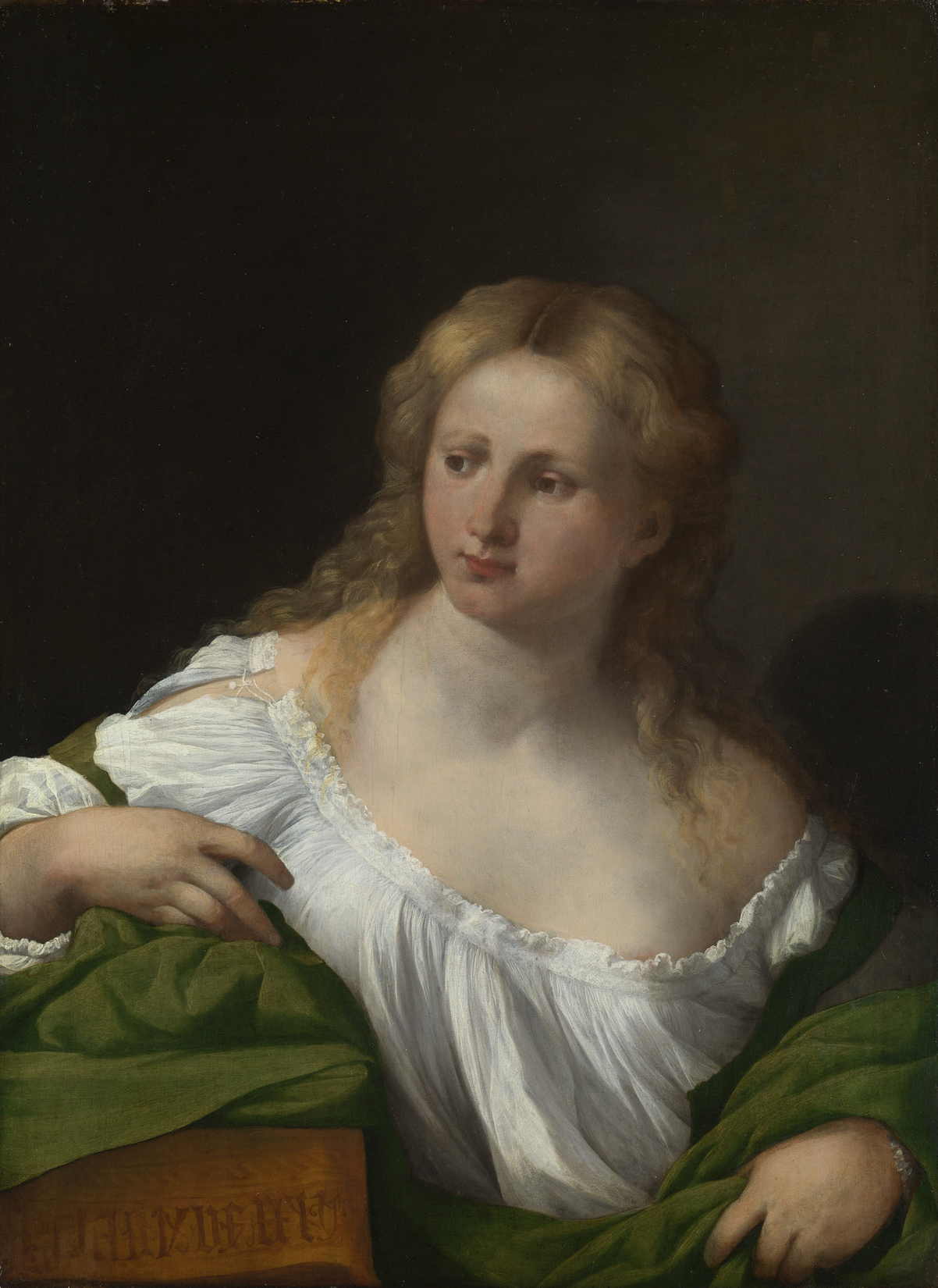
Palma: A Sibyl, c. 1522–1524

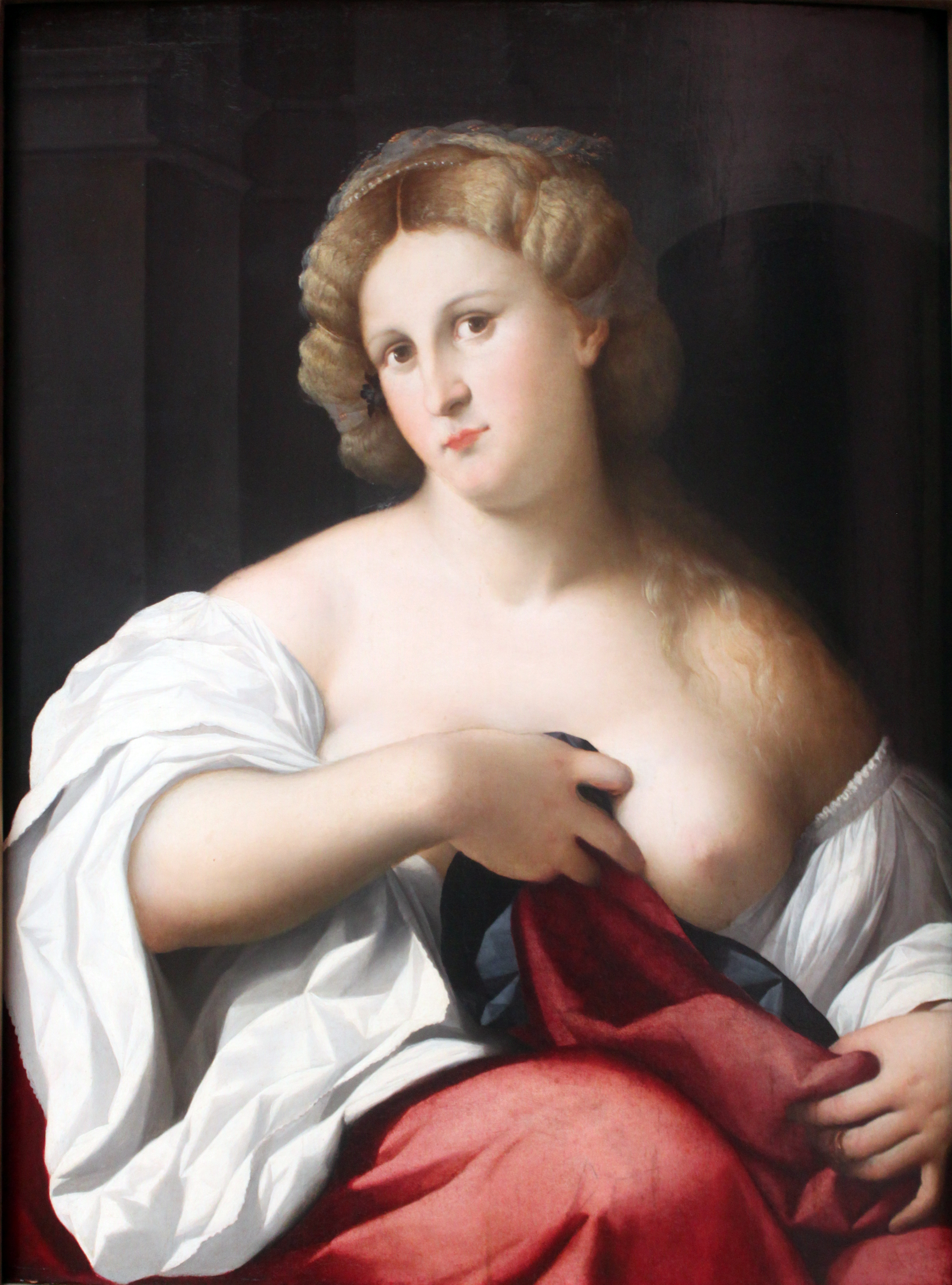
Palma: Young Woman with Bare Breast, c. 1525

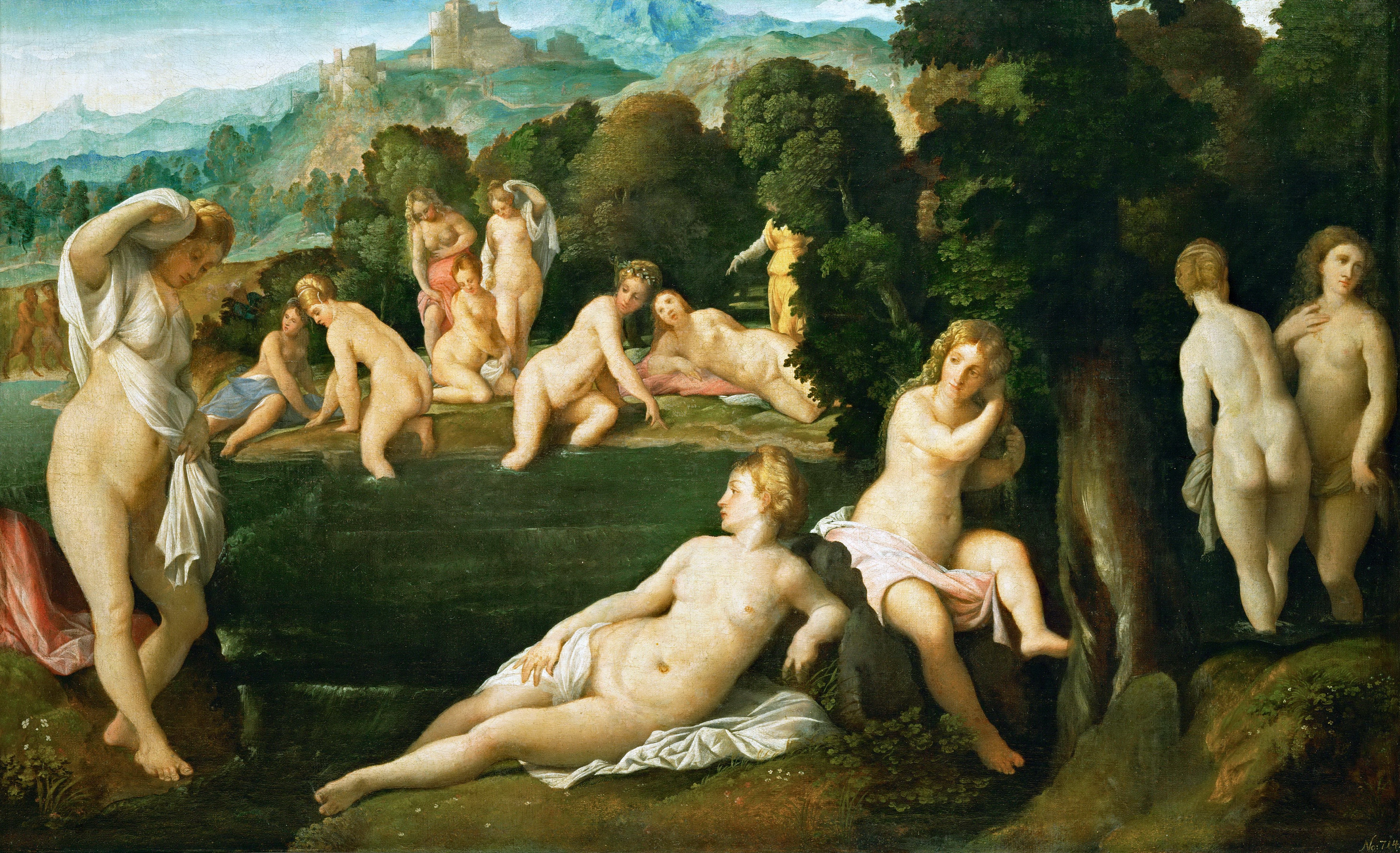
Palma: Bathing Nymphs, c. 1525–1528

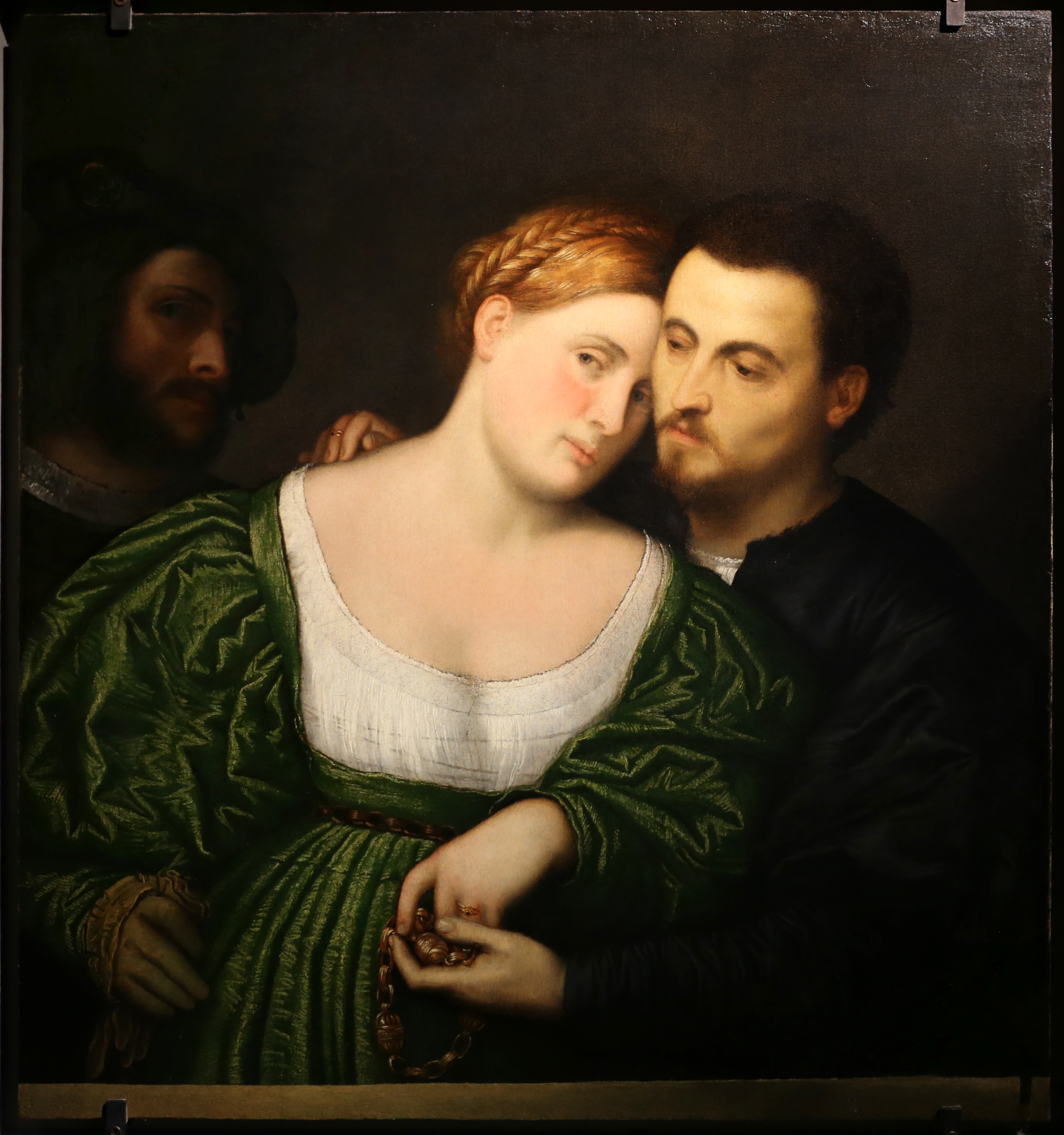
Paris Bordone: Venetian Lovers, c. 1525–1530

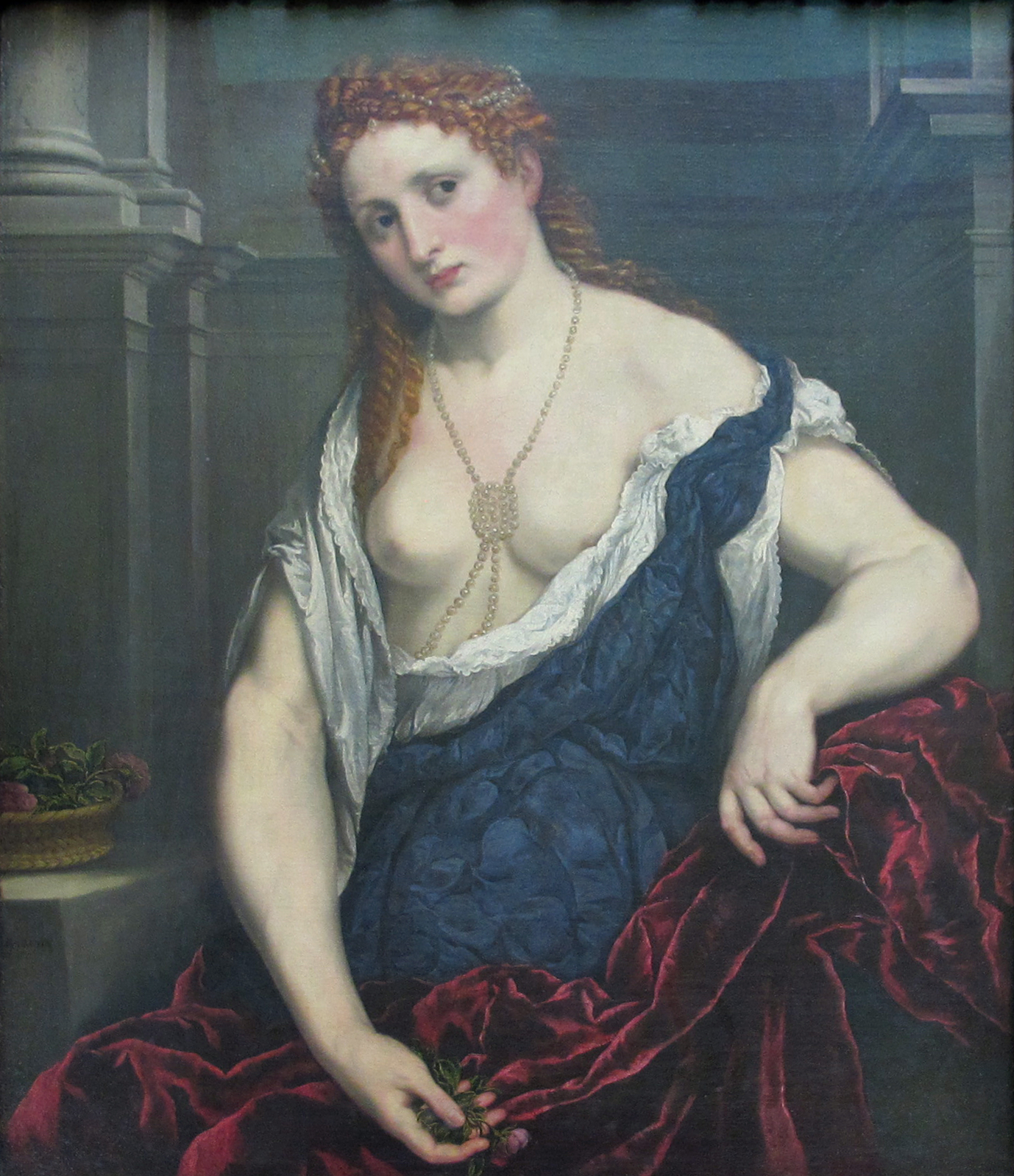
Paris Bordone: Woman with a Rose, c. 1540

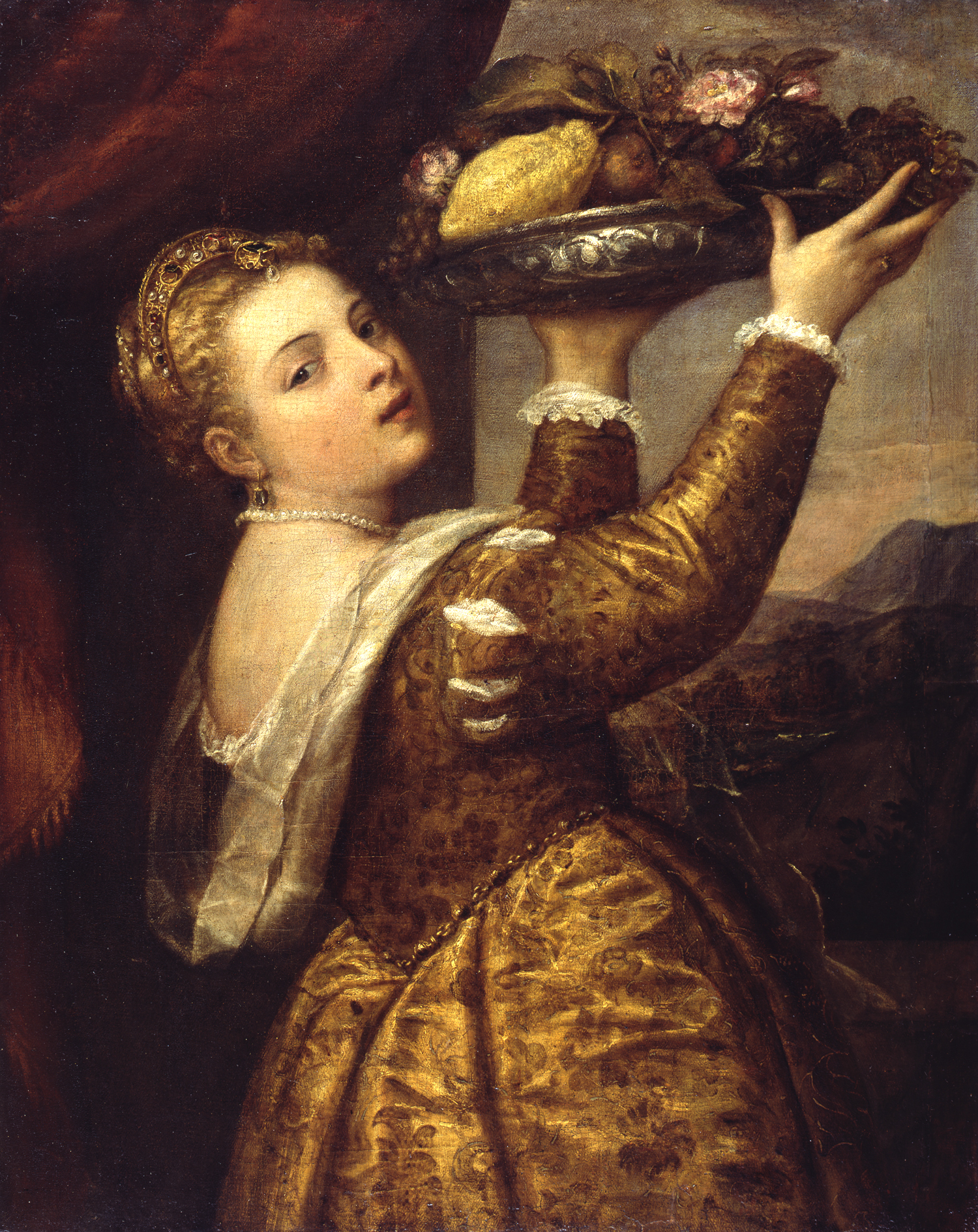
Titian: Lavinia as Flora, c. 1550s

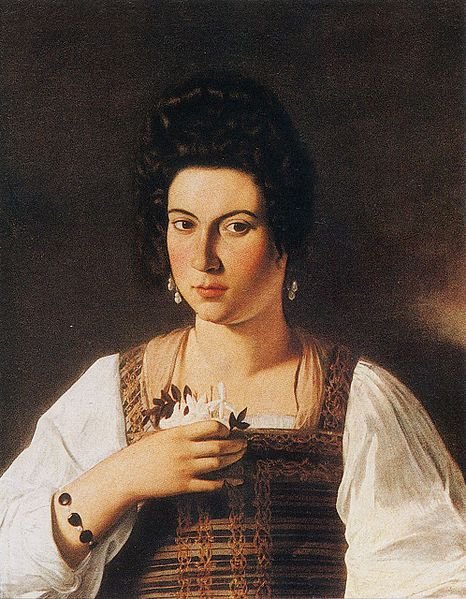
Caravaggio: A Courtesan, c. 1597

== Sources ==
- Burckhardt, Jacob (1955) [1859]. Gesammelte Werke. Vol. 3 (5th ed.). Basel: Benno Schwabe & Co. p. 249, note 3.
- Collier-Frick, Carole (1987). "Dal giardino dei bei fiori" [Translated from the Italian] (PDF). Carte Italiane. 1 (8): 37–52. doi:10.5070/C918011256.
- Gould, Cecil (1987) [1975]. The Sixteenth-Century Italian Schools. National Gallery Catalogues. London: William Clowes Ltd. pp. 184–5, 187–8.
- Held, Julius S. (1961). "17. Flora: Goddess and Courtesan". In Meiss, Millard (ed.). Essays in Honor of Erwin Panofsky. Vol. 1. New York: New York University Press. pp. 201–18.
- Humfrey, Peter (1995). Painting in Renaissance Venice. New Haven and London: Yale University Press. pp. 162–8.
- Jones, Jonathan (4 April 2012). "Flora in the flesh: Palma Vecchio's A Blonde Woman". The Guardian (online ed.).
- Kren, Thomas; Burke, Jill; Campbell, Stephen J., eds. (2018). The Renaissance Nude. J. Paul Getty Museum. pp. 346–7. ISBN 978-1-60606-584-6.
- Mellenchamp, Emma H. (June 1969). "A Note on the Costume of Titian's Flora". The Art Bulletin. 51 (2): 174–7. doi:10.2307/3048611. JSTOR 3048611.
- Nabokov, Vladimir (1969). Ada or Ardor: A Family Chronicle. New York: McGraw Hill International, Inc. p. 141. (Ada Online).
- Phillips, Claude (1897). The Earlier Work of Titian. London: Seeley & Co., Limited. pp. 18, 52.
- Philipps, Adolf (February 1905). "Die Kunst der Renaissance in Italien" [Abridged from the German]. Masters in Art. Palma Vecchio. Venetian School. Vol. 6, Part 62. Boston MA: Bates & Guild Co. pp. 26–7.
- Richter, Jean Paul (1910). The Mond Collection, an Appreciation. Vol. 1. London: John Murray. pp. 129–36.
- Santore, Cathy (2008). "Like a Nymph". Source: Notes in the History of Art. 27 (4): 20–1. doi:10.1086/sou.27.4.23207904. JSTOR 23207904. S2CID 192992924.
- Shapiro, Gavriel (2014). The Tender Friendship and the Charm of Perfect Accord: Nabokov and His Father. Ann Arbor: University of Michigan Press. p. 156. ISBN 978-0-472-11918-9.
- Spahn, Annemarie (1932). Palma Vecchio (in German). Leipzig: Karl W. Hiersemann. p. 126.
- Wardleworth, Dennis (2003). "The 'friendly' battle for the Mond Bequest". The British Art Journal. 4 (3): 87–93. JSTOR 41614493.
- "Palma Vecchio | A Blonde Woman | NG3939". National Gallery. Retrieved 28 November 2022.
- "RCIN 405763 – A Sibyl". Royal Collection Trust. Retrieved 14 January 2023.
- "Venus and Cupid: 109". The Fitzwilliam Museum. Retrieved 17 January 2023.
- "Palma Vecchio | A Blonde Woman | NG3939". National Gallery.
- "RCIN 405763 – A Sibyl". Royal Collection Trust.
- "Venus and Cupid: 109". The Fitzwilliam Museum.
