= Blonde woman =

Blonde or blond woman may refer to:

- Blonde stereotype, a stereotype of blonde women as more desirable but less intelligent than brunettes
- Blonde joke, a joke cycle based on the dumb blonde stereotype
- A Blonde Woman, a c. 1520s painting by Palma Vecchio
