= Salome (Titian, Madrid) =

Painting by Titian in Madrid

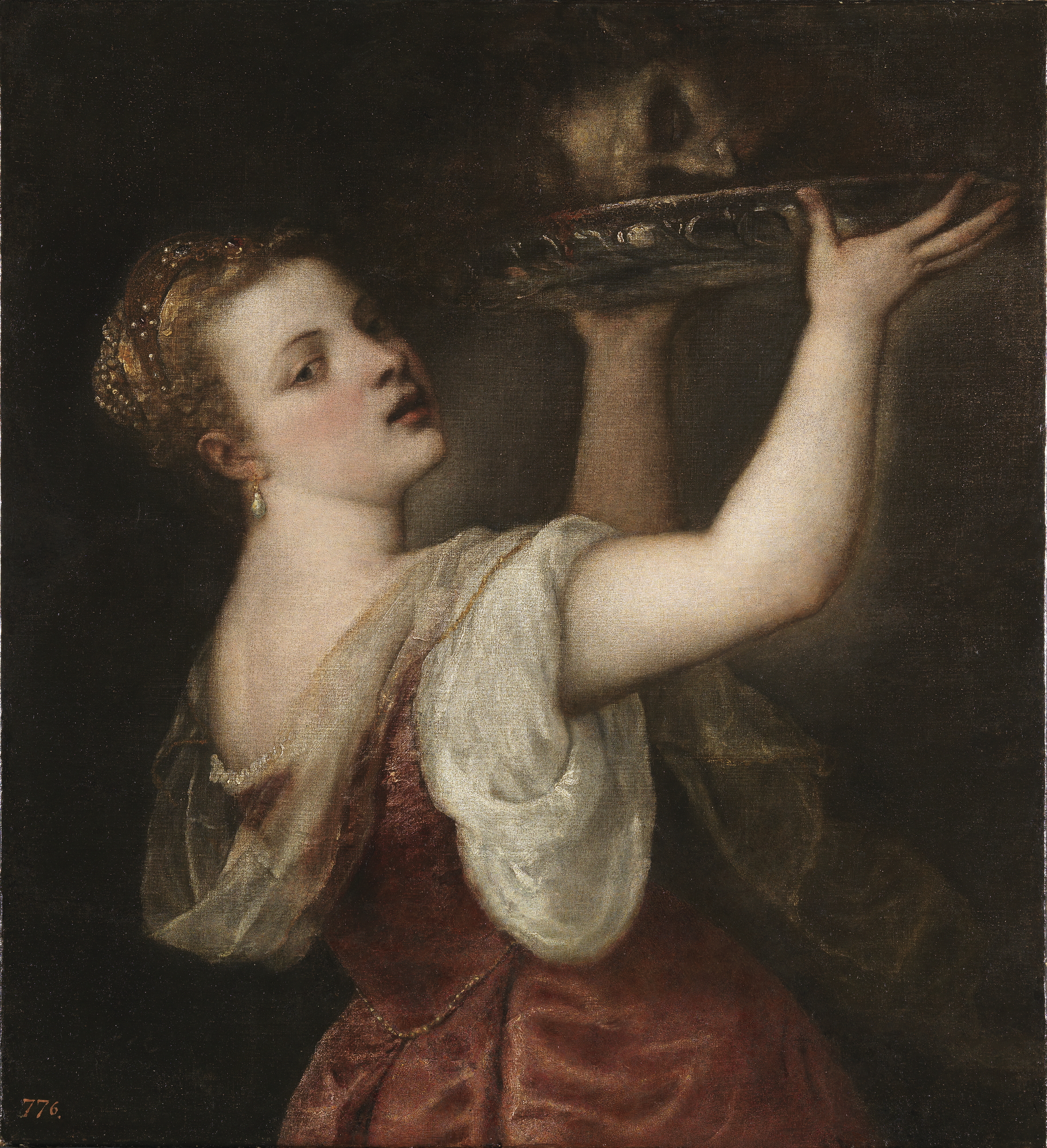
- Artist: Titian
- Year: c. 1550
- Medium: Oil on canvas
- Dimensions: 87 cm × 80 cm (34 in × 31 in)
- Location: Museo del Prado, Madrid

Salome, also known as Salome with the Head of John the Baptist, is an oil on canvas painting by the Venetian painter Titian, made c. 1550. It is held in the collection of the Museo del Prado, in Madrid. It is not to be confused with other compositions of Salome and Judith by Titian.

== Subject ==
Salome, in Jewish history, was the name borne by three women of the Herod dynasty. Titian depicts the daughter of Herodias by her first husband Herod Philip. She was the wife successively of Philip the Tetrarch and Aristobulus, son of Herod of Chalcis. This Salome is the only one of the three who is mentioned in the New Testament, and only in connection with the execution of John the Baptist. Herod Antipas, pleased by her dancing, offered her a reward "unto the half of my kingdom"; instructed by Herodias, she asked for John the Baptist's "head in a charger".

== History ==
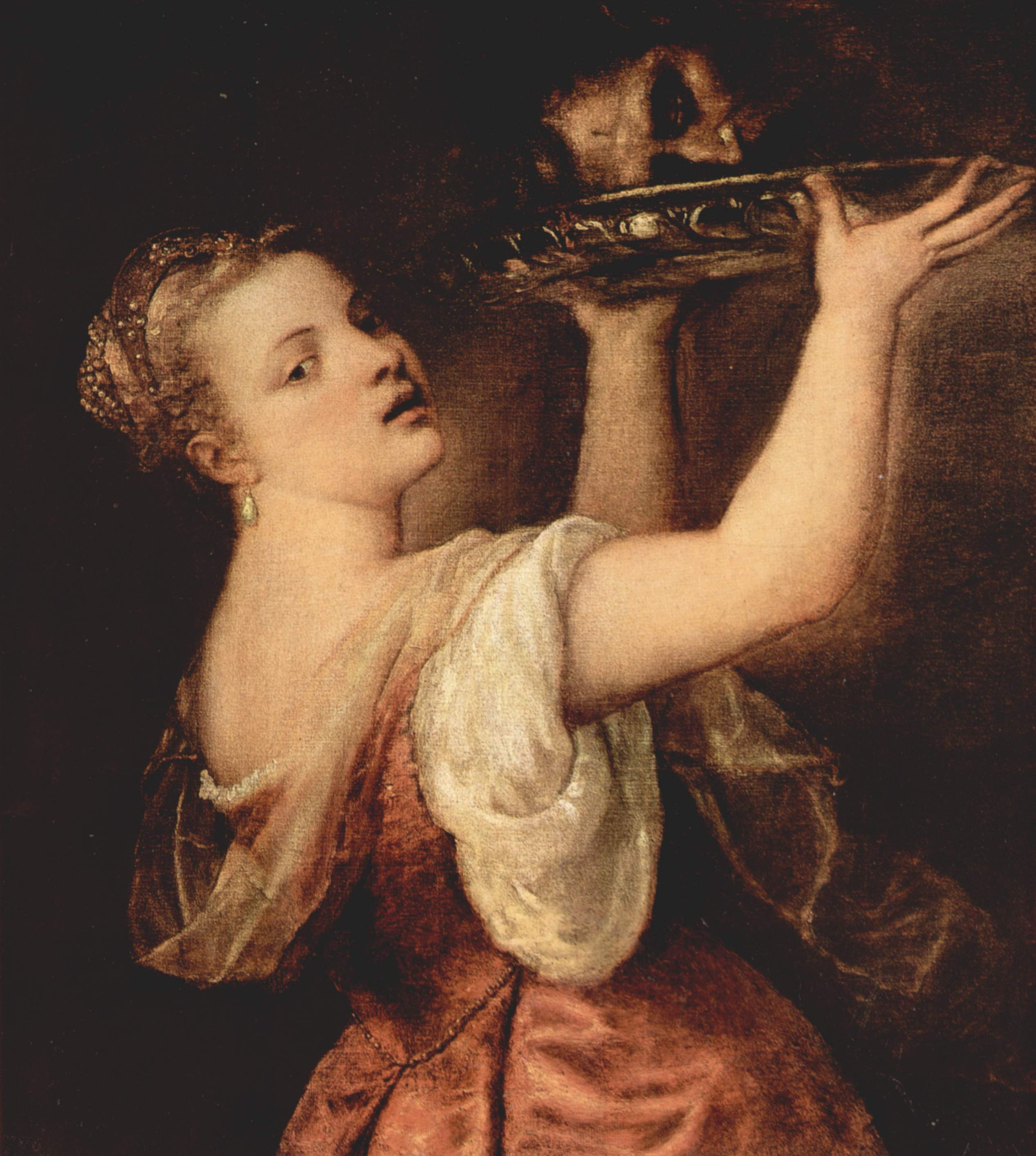
Salomé (c. 1550)

The picture was painted about 1550. It was possibly once in the collection of Charles I of England, and later entered the collection of Charles II of Spain. Crowe and Cavalcaselle called it "evidently [the] work of an imitator". Charles Ricketts ascribed to the later 1560s supposed retouches by Titian upon the Salome of the Prado, which he considered "otherwise a poor studio variant" of the Lavinia with the Charger, painted in the 1550s. Walter Gronau, with others, have thought it an original work by Titian.

== Analysis ==
The composition of the painting is similar to the portrait of Lavinia at Berlin. According to Georg Gronau, "The colouring is more brilliant, deeper, in the Madrid picture."

== Provenance ==
- Collection of the 1st Marquess of Leganés, 1652–1655;
- Spanish Royal Collection (purchased from the estate of the Marquess of Leganés, 1652–1655;
- Royal Alcázar of Madrid, 1666;
- New Royal Palace of Madrid, "secretaría de Estado" ["Secretary of State"], 1814–1818, no. 659?).

== Gallery ==
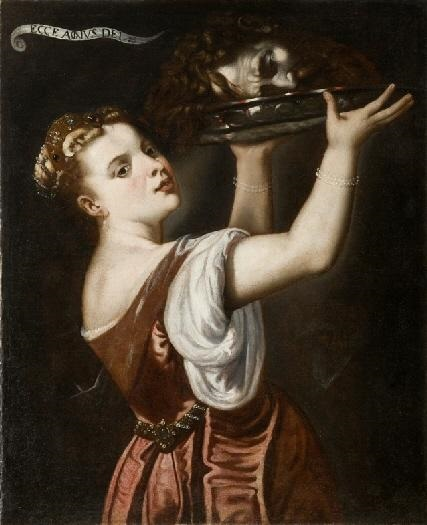
Anonymous copy of the Venetian School (c. 1550–1559)

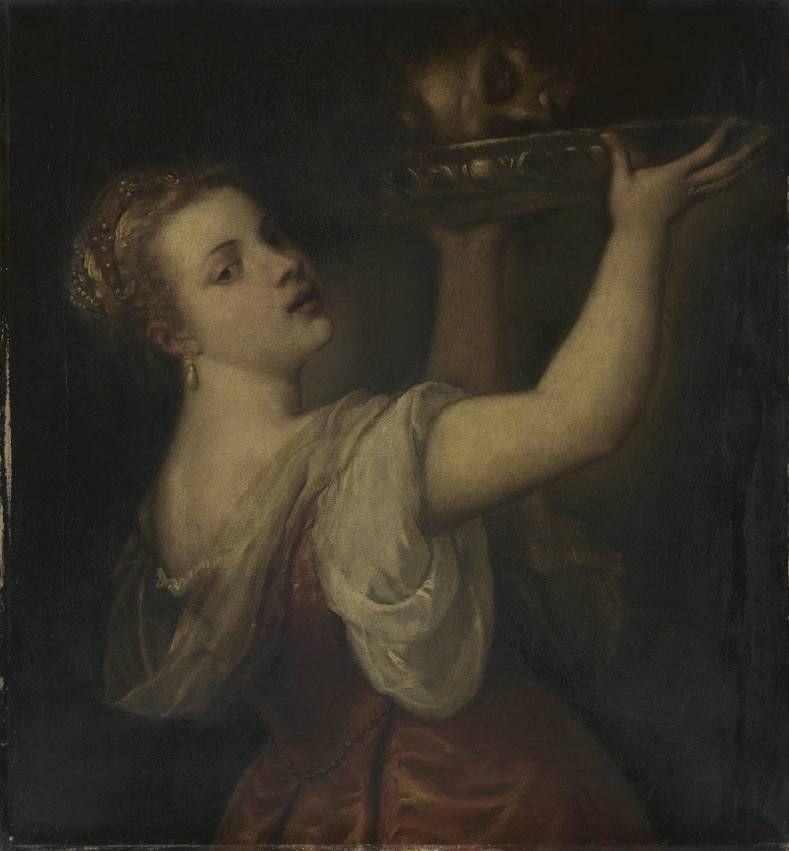
Copy by Franz von Lenbach (1868)

== See also ==
- List of works by Titian

== Sources ==
- Chisholm, Hugh, ed. (1911). "Salome". Encyclopædia Britannica. Vol. 24 (11th ed.). Cambridge University Press. p. 85.
- Falomir Faus, Miguel (2014). "Salome". Museo Nacionel del Prado. Retrieved 10 August 2022.
- Gronau, Georg (1904). Titian. London: Duckworth and Co; New York: Charles Scribner's Sons. p. 304.
- Lefort, Paul (1896). Les Musées de Madrid: Le Prado, San Fernando, L'Armeria. Paris: Bureaux de la Gazette des Beaux-Arts. p. 16.
- Neginsky, Rosina (2014). Salome: The Image of a Woman Who Never Was. Cambridge Scholars Publishing. pp. 95–100, 120.
- Ricketts, Charles (1910). Titian. London: Methuen & Co. Ltd. pp. 147, 188.
