= Penitent Magdalene (Titian, 1531) =

Painting by Titian

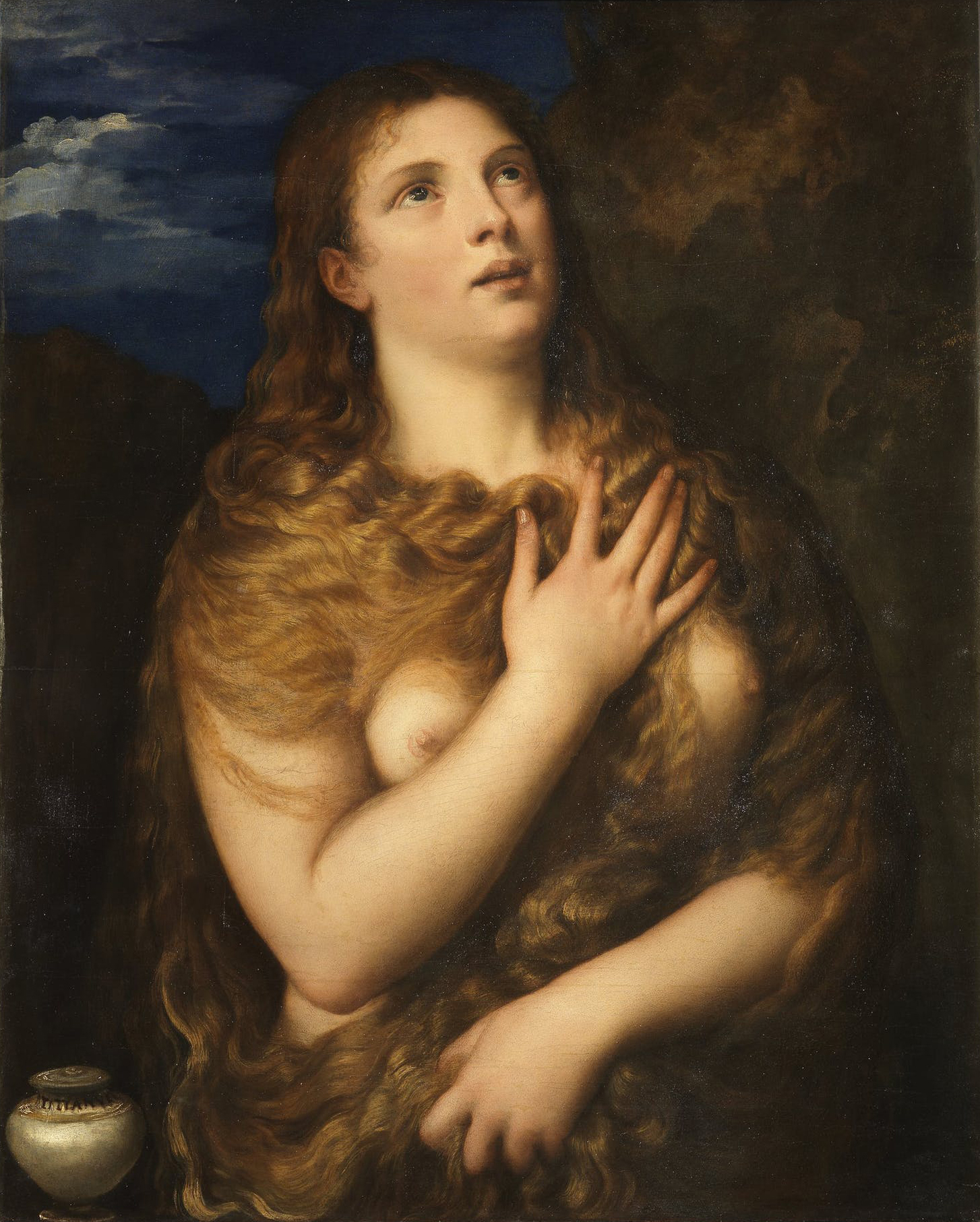
- Artist: Titian
- Year: c. 1531
- Medium: oil on canvas
- Dimensions: 85 cm × 68 cm (33 in × 27 in)
- Location: Palazzo Pitti; Florence

The Penitent Magdalene is a painting of saint Mary Magdalene by Titian dating to around 1531, signed 'TITIANUS' on the ointment jar to the left. It is now in the Sala di Apollo of the Palazzo Pitti in Florence, Italy.

== History ==
It was commissioned by the Duke of Mantua, Federico Gonzaga, to be a devotional image for the famous poet Vittoria Colonna (1490–1547). However, it is universally believed that Vittoria gave the Magdalen away to Eleonora Gonzaga, as it was found in her son the Duke of Urbino's collection in 1631. Colonna, a learned and devout woman, was greatly inspired by Titian's image of the Magdalen, even though the Magdalen is very sensuously portrayed in Titian's depiction. The Magdalen's radiant appearance before a dark background, as if her light comes from within, caused Colonna to believe that the Magdalen was "aglow with her burning passion for Christ."

== Analysis ==
The subject of the Magdalen as a sinner and fallen woman returned to the path of virtue by Jesus was very popular in the 16th century, allowing artists to combine eroticism and religion without courting scandal. Titian's version of the subject shows her at a moment of elation and deep repentance, with tears in her eyes (referring to her washing Jesus' feet and drying them with her hair) and her gaze raised heavenwards. Erotic though it is, as Vasari notes, her nudity refers to the medieval legend that her clothes fell apart during the thirty years she spent repenting in the desert after the Ascension of Jesus. Indeed, most of the many depictions of the subject in art showed the Magdalen with no clothing at all, or just a loose wrap, as in Titian's later treatment. According to popular works such as the Golden Legend, she spent her last years naked and alone in a hermitage in the mountains of Provence, fed only by the singing angels who visited her daily. Thus her lack of clothing symbolises her abandonment of jewels, gold and worldly goods to her faith in Christ. Additionally, the Magdalen's golden hair, fleshy body, and full lips correspond with the Renaissance beauty standards at the time.

At the end of the Middle Ages a tradition grew up that she had grown a "suit" of hair all over her body except for her face, hands and feet. This is thought to have originated in liturgical drama and is often depicted in South German art. Titian's depiction achieves a similar effect and may well recall the German treatments.

== See also ==
- List of works by Titian

== Sources ==
- (in Polish) Wielkie muzea. Palazzo Pitti, wyd. HPS, Warszawa 2007, ISBN 978-83-60688-42-7
- (in Polish) J. Szapiro Ermitraż (translated Maria Dolińska), Wydawnictwo Progress, Moskwa, 1976.
- Goffen, Rona. Titian's Women. Yale UP, 1997.
