= Portrait of a Young Woman Known as "La Bella" =

Painting by Palma Vecchio

Young Woman ("La Bella")
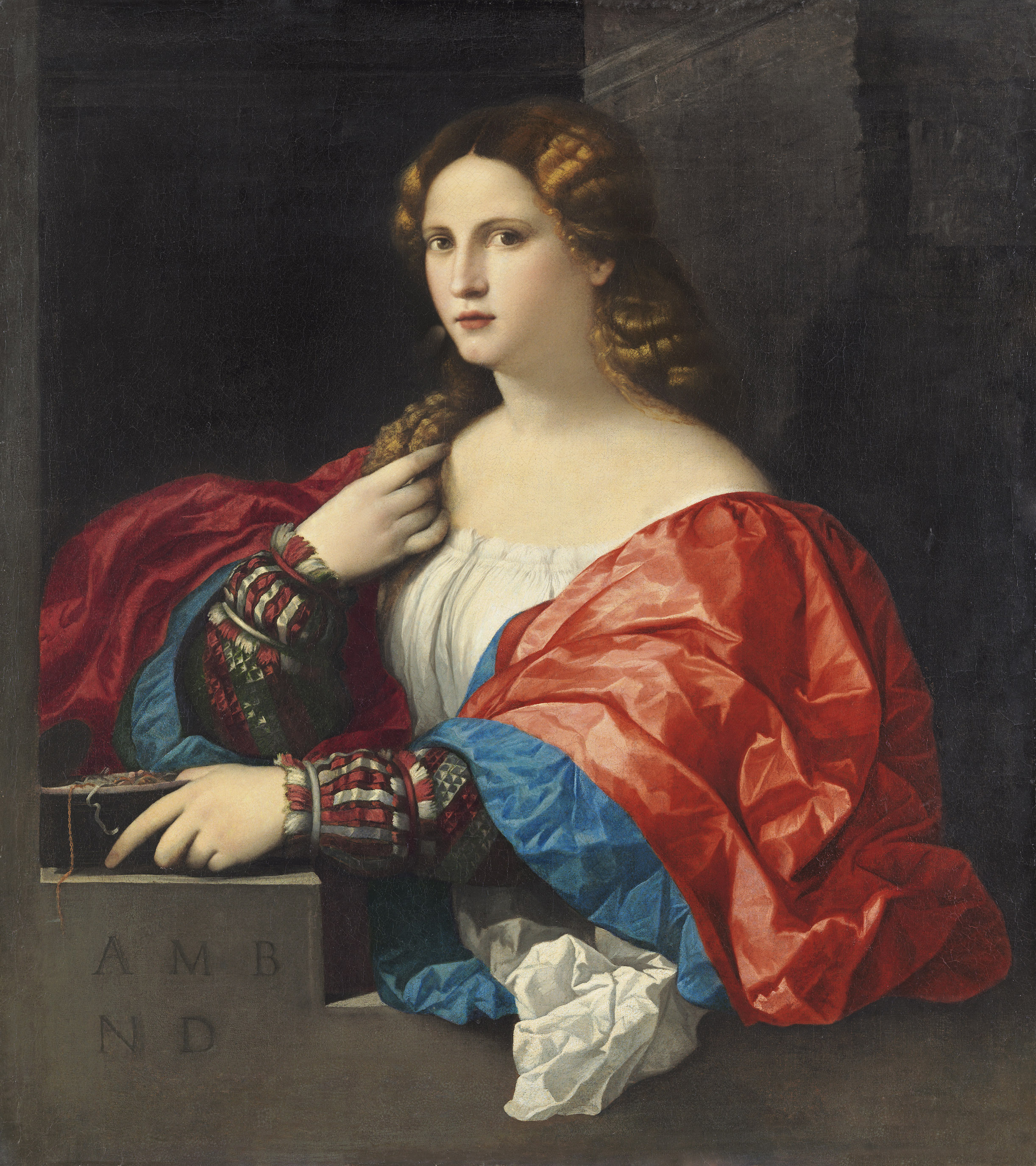
- Artist: Palma Vecchio (attribution)
- Year: c. 1518–1520
- Medium: Oil on canvas
- Dimensions: 90 cm × 80 cm (35 in × 31 in)
- Location: Thyssen-Bornemisza Museum, Madrid
- Accession: 310 (1959.2)

Portrait of a Young Woman Known as "La Bella" (Spanish: Retrato de una mujer joven llamada "La Bella") is an oil painting attributed to Palma Vecchio, and dated to around 1518 to 1520, in the collection of the Thyssen-Bornemisza Museum in Madrid. It was formerly attributed to Titian.

== Description ==
The sitter, shown half-length, has been said to possess a "high and aristocratic air" in her red mantle, holding a jewel-case in her left hand, and her face, with its finely chiselled features, is turned to the spectator. "One hand", write Crowe and Cavalcaselle, "plays with the locks of hair which fall luxuriantly over the shoulder, the other holds a box of ornaments on a marble pedestal. The snow-white bosom is chastely veiled by a fine web of white drawn together in the closest and most delicate plaits. Over this comes a parti-colored mantilla of stiff tissue in gay shades of red and ruby, cut into numerous angular sections, lined with bright ultramarine diversified with the snowy texture of a muslin handkerchief. From wrist to elbow the arm is lightly decked with a lace sleeve braced at intervals with ribbons of red and green, and striped with colors of the same. It is impossible to conceive anything more indicative of quality than this figure, and though we notice a certain want of balance in the mass of the draperies, and a lack of nature in the kaleidoscopic mode of setting them, the harmony of all the bits thus put together is so grateful and bright, the touch is so delicate in grain, that we wonder and admire."

== Analysis ==
This picture was formerly believed to be the work of Titian, and is still often spoken of by the title which it long bore, La Bella di Tiziano (lit. 'Titian's Beauty'). It is now, however, believed to be by Palma Vecchio, and is regarded as one of that painter's finest portrayals, perhaps of one of the famous beauties of the day in Venice — "as noble in her calm repose", says Hippolyte Taine, "as a Greek statue." The Thyssen-Bornemisza Museum calls it "one of [Palma's] most beautiful and successful figure compositions."

== Provenance ==
For many years this picture hung in the Sciarra-Colonna Palace in Rome, by whom it was attributed to Titian. It was later owned by Alphonse de Rothschild in Paris, Baron Edmond de Rothschild, who displayed it in the Château de Ferrières, and other members of the Rothschild family, until it was sold by Baron Guy de Rothschild in 1958 to Baron Hans Heinrich Thyssen-Bornemisza for his Villa Favorita.

== Related works ==
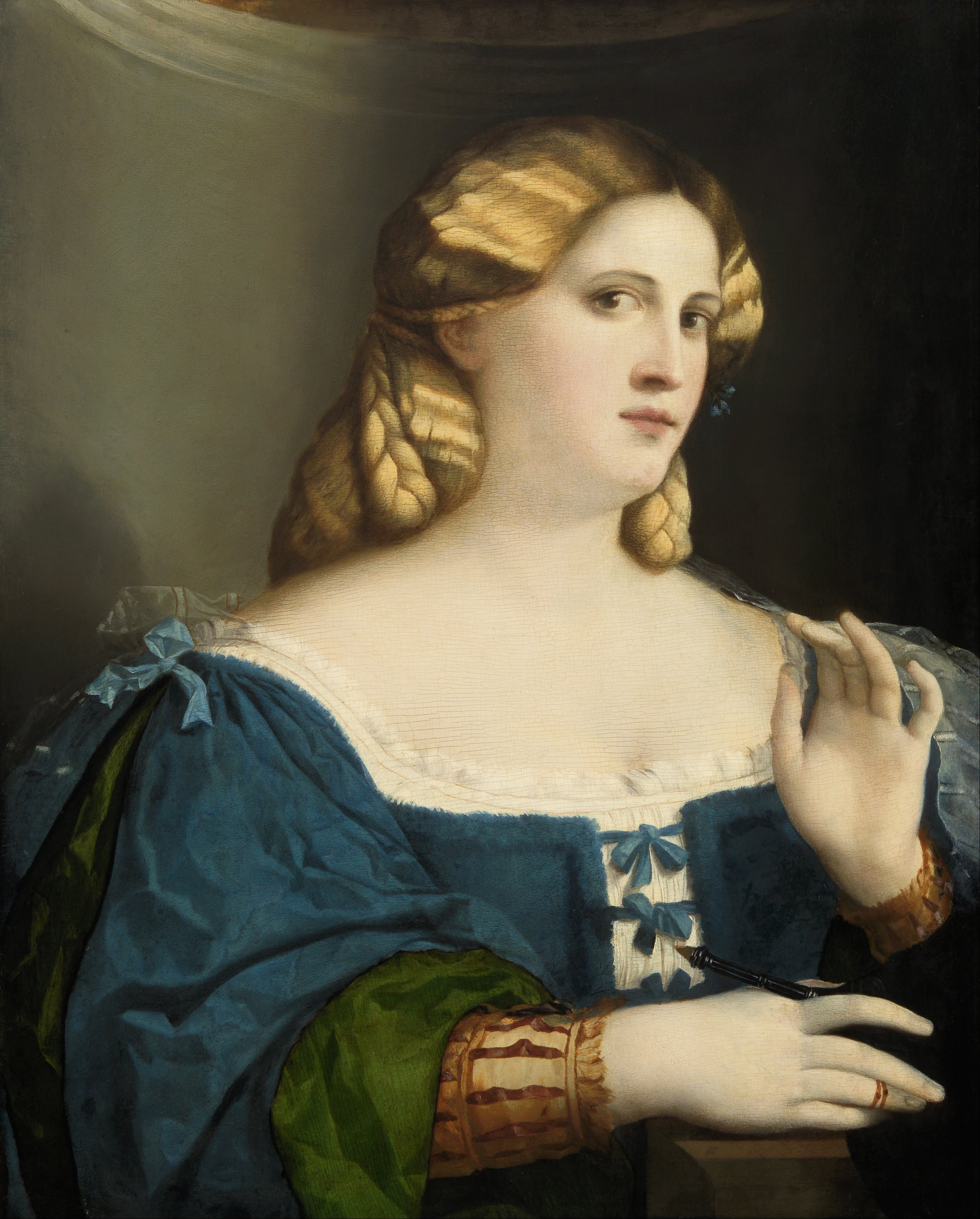
Palma: Young Woman in a Blue Dress, with Fan, c. 1512–1514

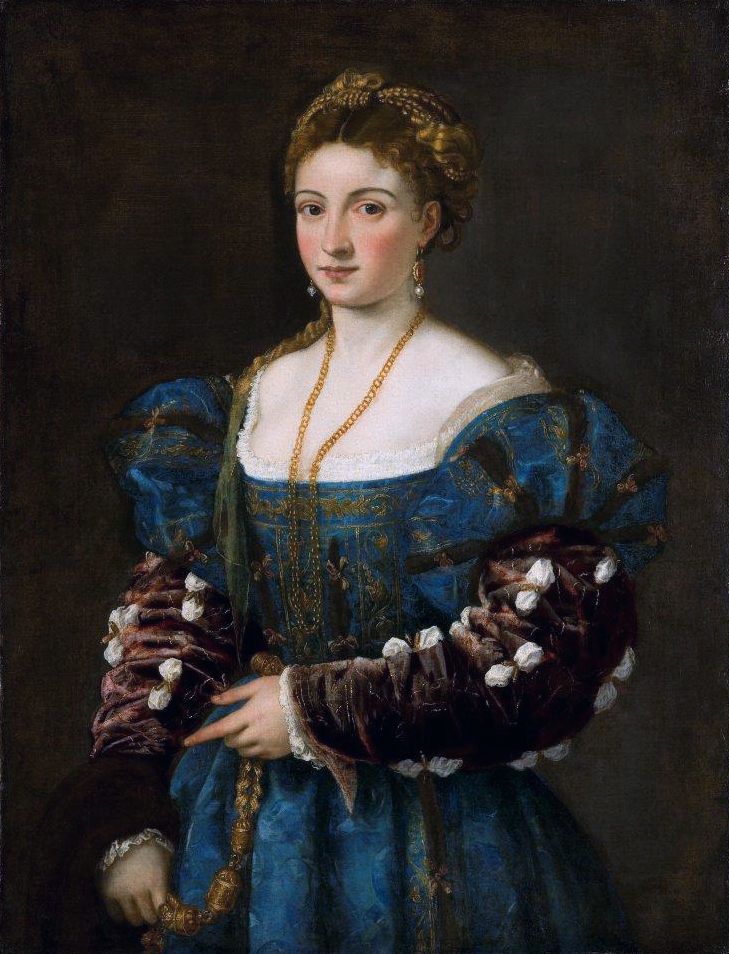
Titian: La Bella, 1536

== Sources ==
- "Portrait of a Lady". Masters in Art, Vol. 6, Part 62 (Palma Vecchio). Boston: Bates & Guild Co., February 1905. p. 39, plate viii.
- "Portrait of a Young Woman Known as "La Bella"" (English). Thyssen-Bornemisza Museum. Retrieved 28 November 2022.
- "Retrato de una mujer joven llamada "La Bella"" (Spanish). Museo Nacional Thyssen-Bornemisza. Retrieved 28 November 2022.
