= Idealised Portrait of a Young Woman as Flora =

Painting by Bartolomeo Veneto

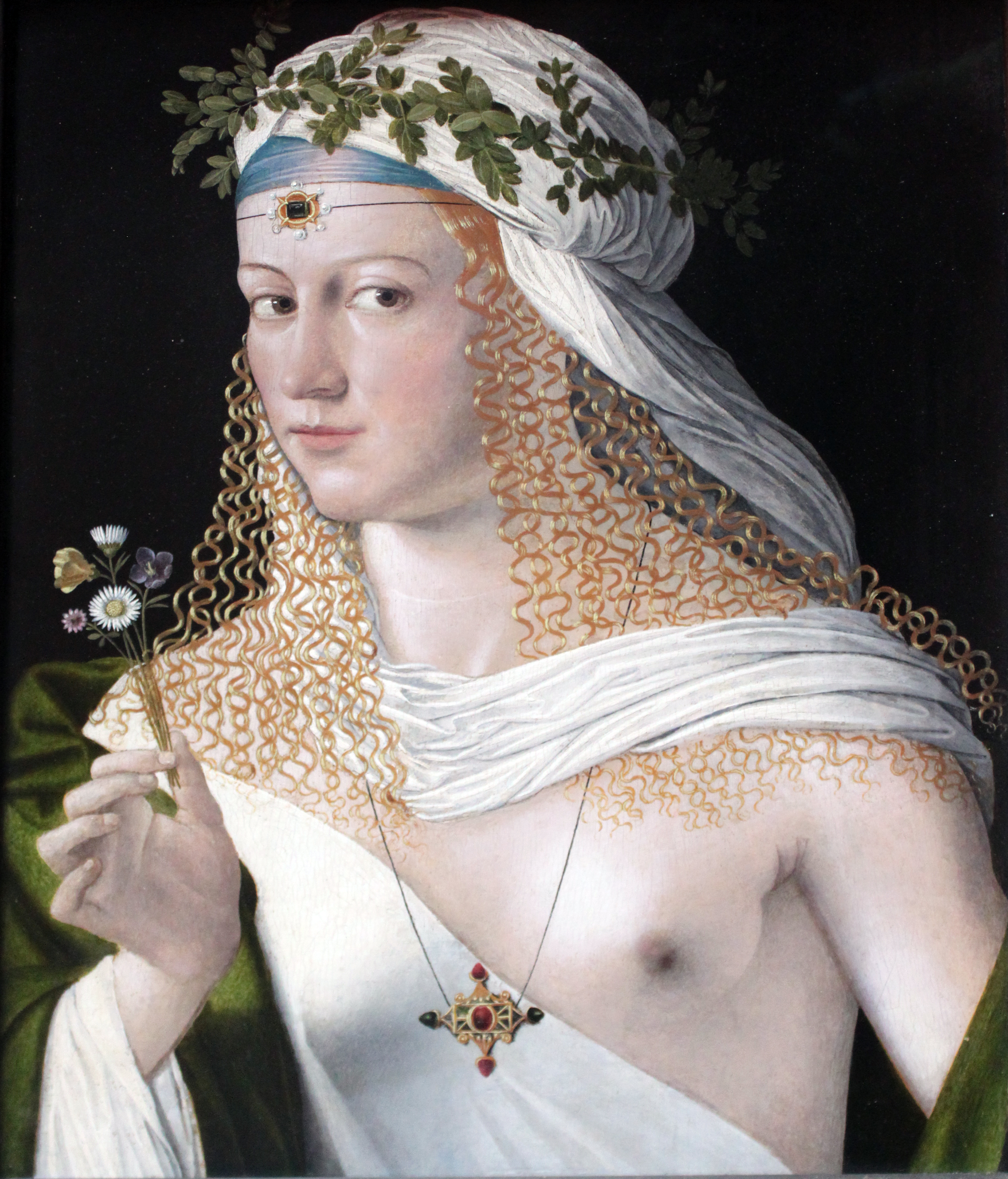
Idealised Portrait of a Young Woman as Flora, c. 1520

Idealised Portrait of a Young Woman as Flora (German: Idealbildnis einer jungen Dame als Flora) is an oil painting by Bartolomeo Veneto, dated to about 1520, in the collection of the Städel, Frankfurt.

== Description ==
The picture was painted in tempera and oil on a poplar wood panel measuring 43.6 cm by 34.6 cm (17.1 in by 13.6 in).

The picture was, on the basis of a tradition, formerly believed to be a portrait of Lucretia Borgia, the notorious daughter of Rodrigo Borgia, better known as Pope Alexander VI. However, the Städel now describes the subject only as an "unknown lady", who is dressed and styled as Flora, the Roman goddess of spring and flowers.

== Provenance ==
The picture was owned by Friedrich Jakob Gsell (1812–1871) and was listed as part of his estate in 1871. It was sold by Georg Plach to Louis Kohlbacher (for the Frankfurter Kunstverein) on 14 March 1872 (no. 153). It was sold as a work of the "Florentine School" to the Städel on 11 April 1872 (accession number 1077).

== Sources ==
- "Idealbildnis einer jungen Dame als Flora, ca. 1520". Städel Museum (Digital Collection). Retrieved 28 January 2023.
- Alexandre Vico Martori, « Lucrècia Borja: l'alteració d'una identitat i l'errònia atribució de la pintura de Flora de Bartolomeo Veneto », Scripta, Revista internacional de literatura i cultura medieval i moderna, n^{o} 9, juin 2017, p. 286-311
