= Girl with a Platter of Fruit =

Painting by Titian

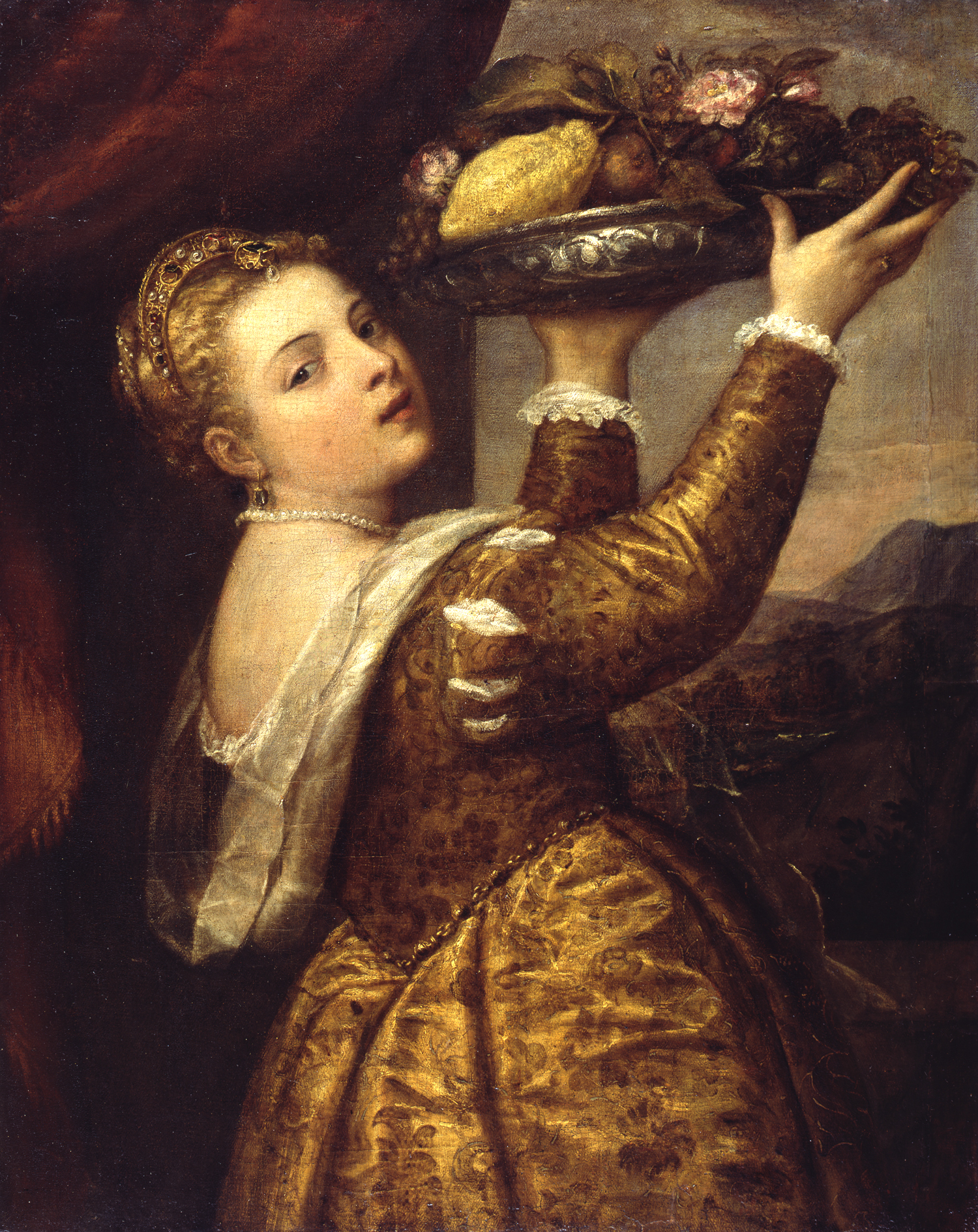
- Artist: Titian
- Year: c. 1555–1558
- Medium: oil on canvas
- Dimensions: 102 cm × 82 cm (40 in × 32 in)
- Location: Gemäldegalerie; Berlin

Girl with a Platter of Fruit (German: Mädchen mit Fruchtschale), also known as Lavinia Holding a Charger Filled with Fruit, Lavinia as Flora, and Pomona, is an oil painting by the Venetian painter Titian, made around 1555–1558, currently residing in the collection of the Gemäldegalerie in Berlin.

== Description ==
The young woman, who is the subject of the painting, shows the back of her copper-colored dress to the viewer as she turns to gaze over her shoulder. She holds a shallow bowl of fruit over her head.

== History ==
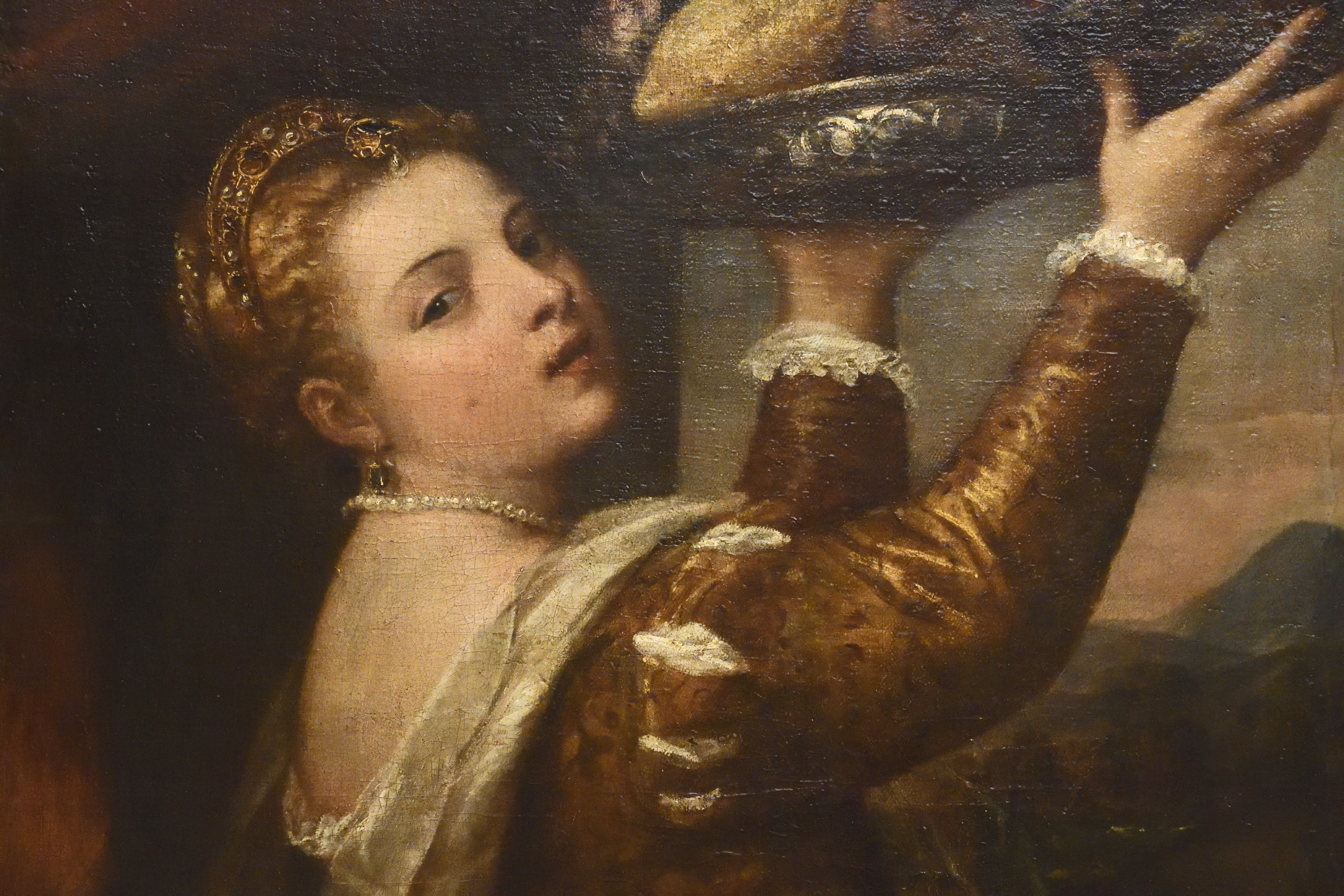
Lavinia with a Platter of Fruit (detail)

The picture was painted about 1555–1558. It was bought in 1832 at Florence from |Abbate Celotti. A similar picture is mentioned in the collection of Emperor Rodolphe II at Prague.

Gronau mentions a "fine replica, done probably in the artist's workshop", which entered the collection of the Earl of Malmesbury.

== Gallery ==
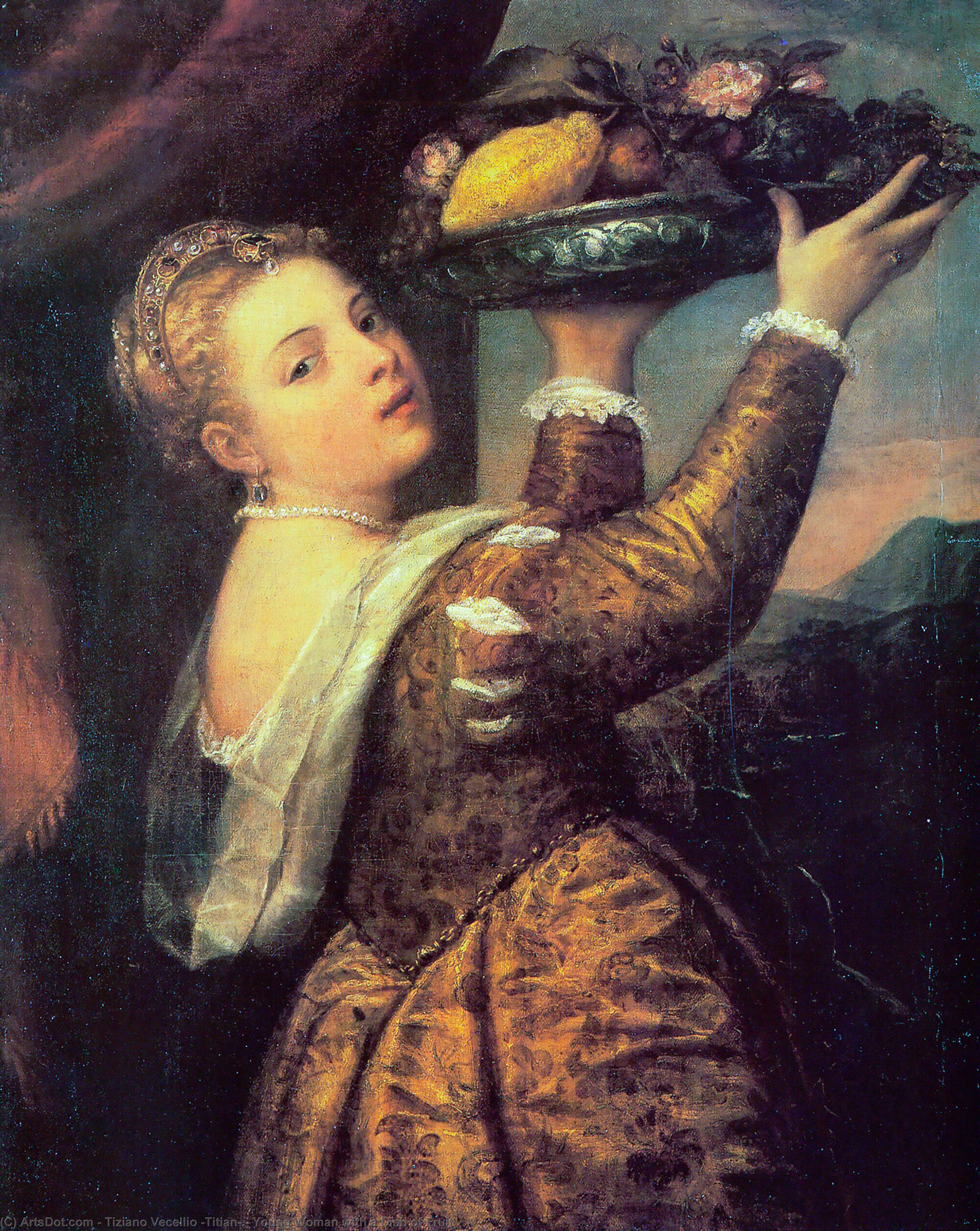
Young Woman with a Dish of Fruit by Titian, c. 1555–58

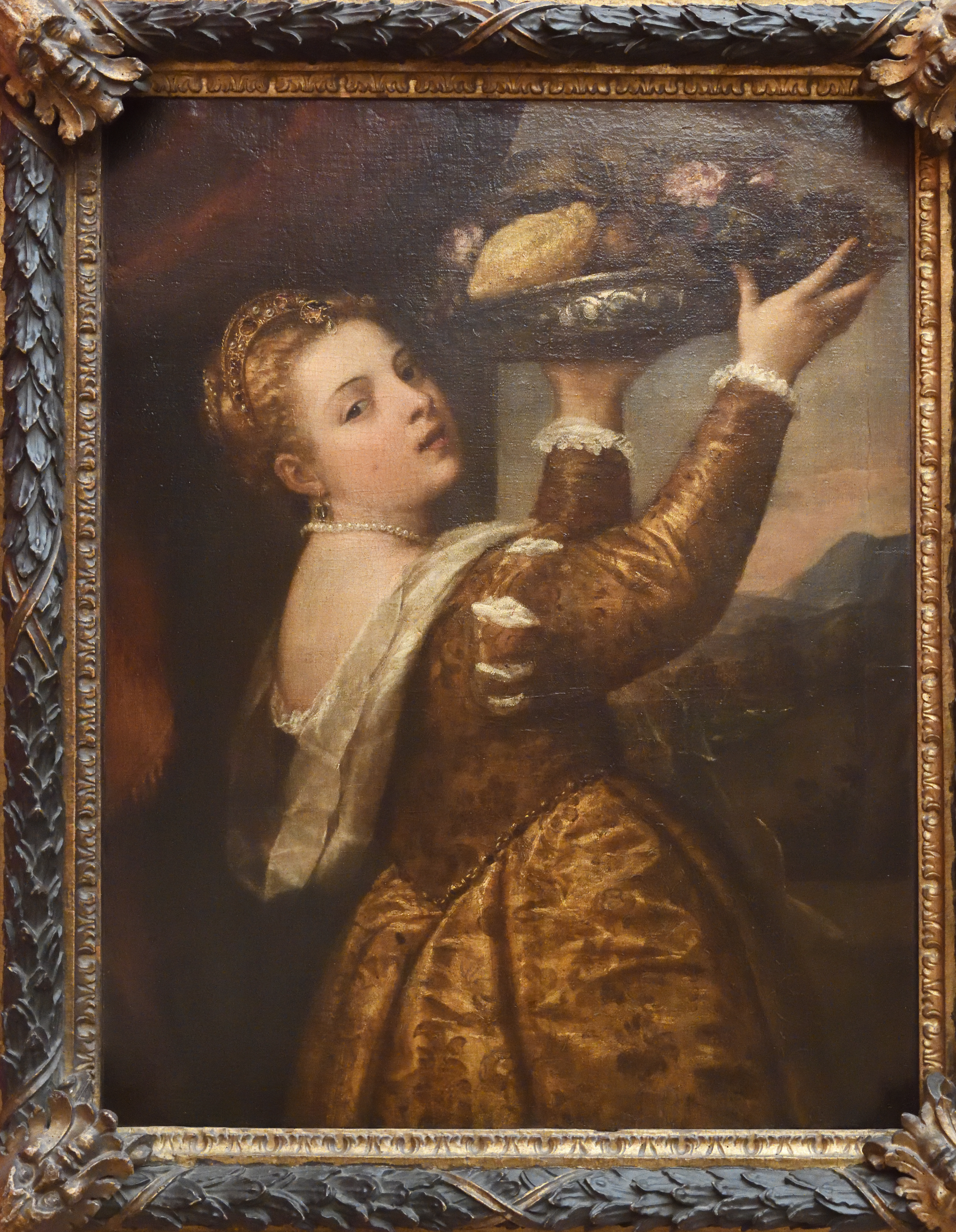
Young Woman with a Dish of Fruit in its frame

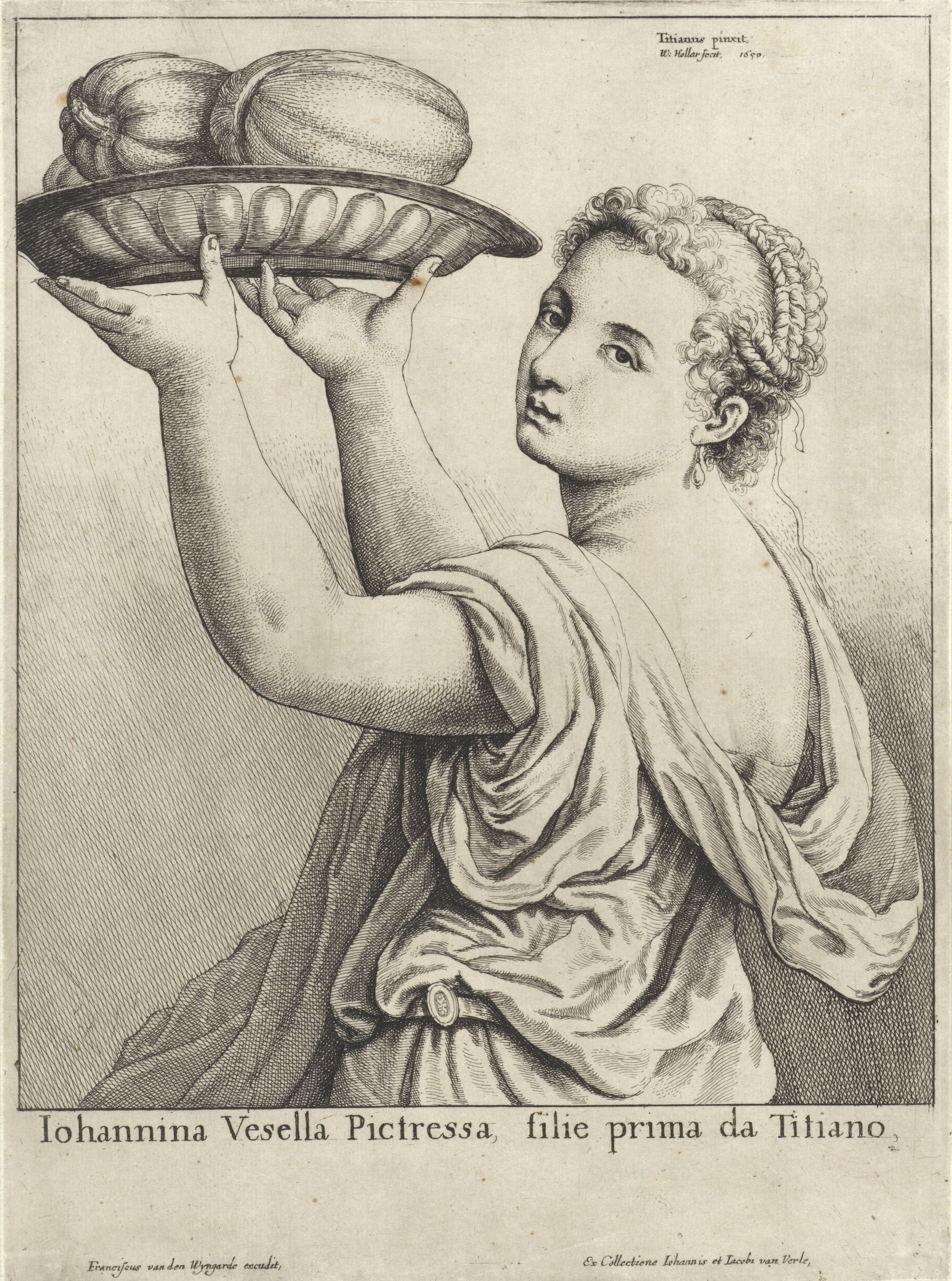
Print by Wenceslaus Hollar, 1649–51

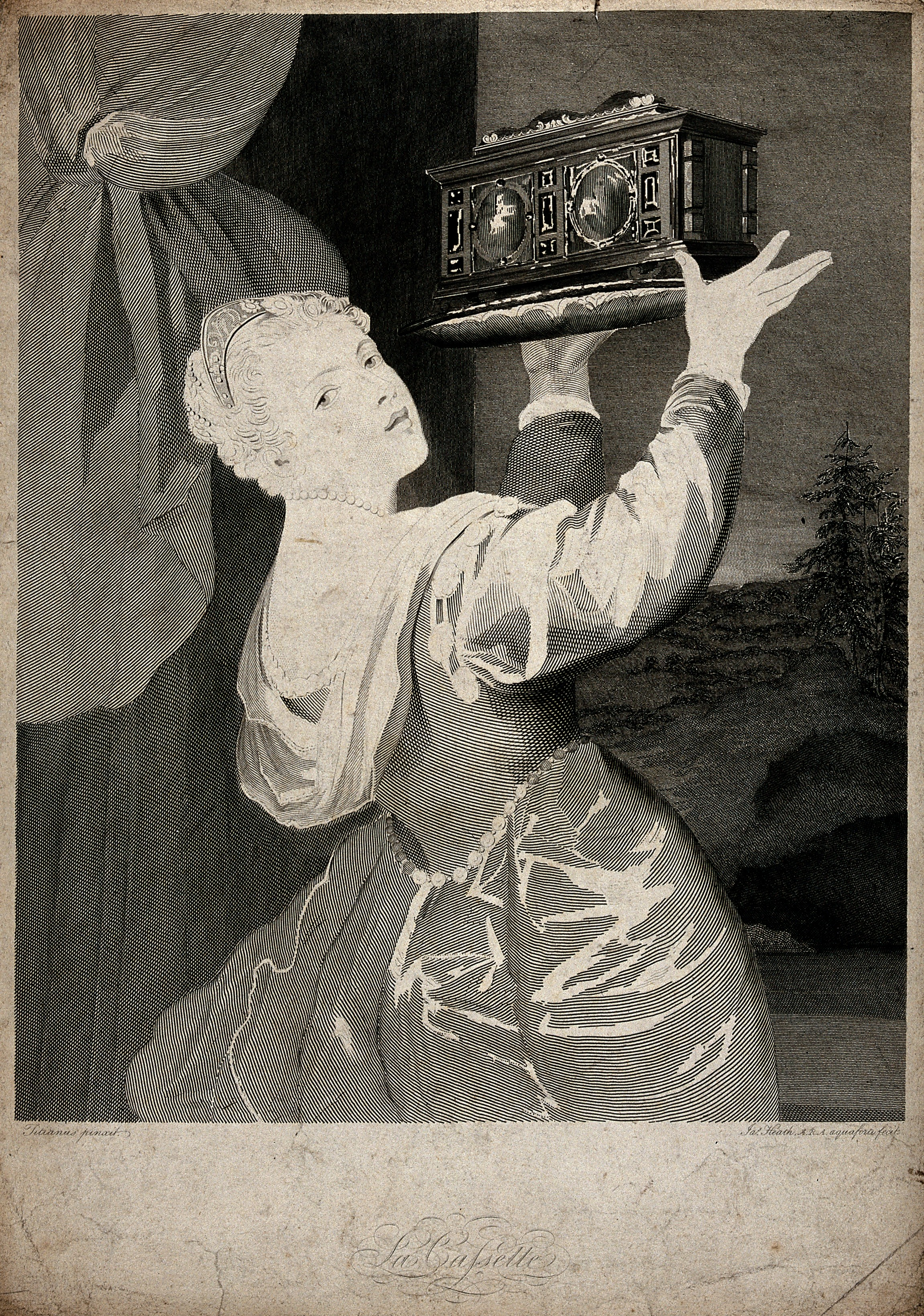
Unfinished etching by James Heath, 1815

== See also ==
- List of works by Titian
- Portrait of Lavinia Vecellio
- Salome (Titian, Madrid)
- Pomona (mythology)

== Sources ==
- Gronau, Georg (1904). Titian. London: Duckworth and Co; New York: Charles Scribner's Sons. pp. 285, 304.
- Ricketts, Christopher (1910). Titian. London: Methuen & Co. Ltd. pp. 147, 179, plate CXXXII.
- "Mädchen mit Fruchtschale". Staatliche Museen zu Berlin. Preußischer Kulturbesitz. Retrieved 11 August 2022.
