= Tityus =

Tityus may refer to:

- A giant from Greek mythology (see Tityos)
- A genus of scorpions (see Tityus (genus))

== Art ==
- The Punishment of Tityus (Michelangelo)
- Tityus (Titian)
- Tityos (Ribera)
