= Ixion (Ribera) =

Painting by Jusepe de Ribera

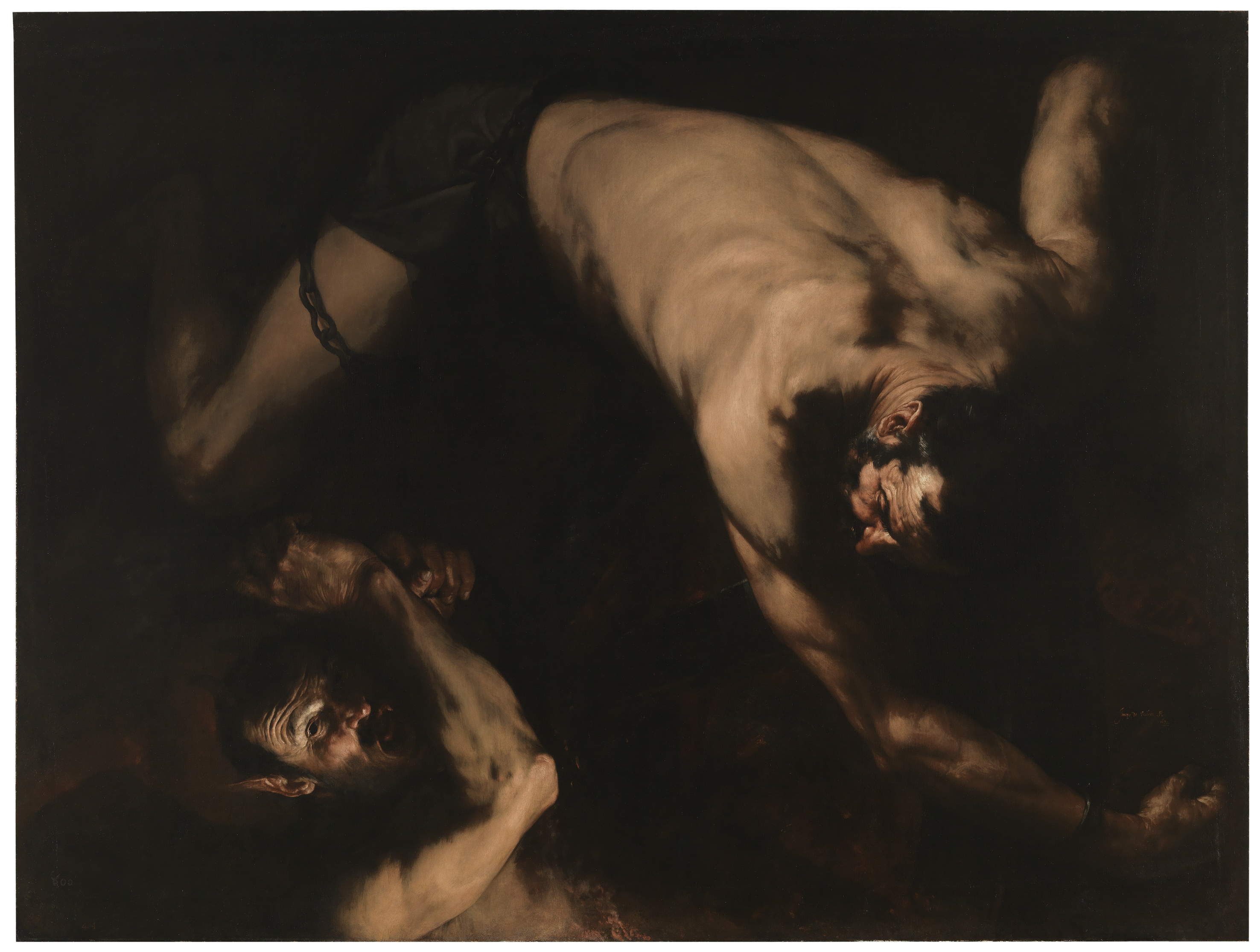
Jusepe de Ribera, Ixion, 1632, Museo del Prado, Madrid

Ixion is a 1632 oil painting, signed and dated by Jusepe de Ribera. It shows a scene from Classical mythology, of Ixion being tortured as the eternal punishment meted out by Zeus. It is one of a series of four paintings by Ribera of the four "Furies" or "Condemned" from Greek mythology. It is held by the Museo del Prado in Madrid, along with Ribera's painting of Tityos; the other two, of Sisyphus and Tantalus, are lost.

== Background ==
Ixion was king of the Lapiths and later father of the Centaurs. He was outlawed after murdering his father-in-law Deioneus. Pardoned by Zeus, he was welcomed to Mount Olympus, but betrayed Zeus's hospitality by trying to seduce his host's wife Hera. As punishment, Zeus sentenced Ixion to be tied to a perpetually turning wheel of fire in Tartaros.

Titian made a similar series of four paintings in 1548–1549 for Binche Palace, the residence of Mary of Hungary in the Habsburg Netherlands, where Mary was Governor for 24 years. On her death in 1558, the series was inherited by Philip II of Spain, and displayed at the Royal Alcázar of Madrid, where they may have influenced Ribera's similar series. Titian's Ixion and Tantalus were lost in the catastrophic fire at the Royal Alcázar in 1734, but the Prado holds Titian's Sisyphus and Tityus (although the Tityus is believed to be a later version by Titian dated to c. 1565, and not the 1540s original). The composition of Titian's lost painting of Tantalus is known from engravings by Giulio Sanuto.

Joachim Sandrart wrote in 1675 that Ribera had painted an earlier series of four paintings of the Furies, similar to Titian's series, for Lucas van Uffelen, which Van Uffelen rejected because his wife found them unsettling. The original versions by Ribera are lost, but the series is known from later copies in the Museo del Prado.

== Description ==
In the painting, the condemned man is depicted face down, his agony expressed by his contorted position and strained muscles, with the dramatic tension accentuated by the lighting. Ixion's large body emerges from a black background and seems to be toppling onto the viewer, whose attention is also drawn by the executioner's fierce gesture to the lower left. His tormentor is a male figure with horns and pointed ears, possibly a satyr. This character is an invention of the artist; in classical mythology, the torments of Hades were administered by the Furies, who were all female, Alecto, Megaera and Tisiphone. The painter may have been inspired in this by an epic poem L'Adone (Adonis) by Giambattista Marino, published in 1632, in which a character with donkey's ears represents greed and ignorance. A second devilish figure appears in the shadows to the lower right.

This work measures 220 cm × 301 cm (87 in × 119 in). It was part of a series of four paintings known as Las Furias (Spanish: "the Furies", also known as "the Condemned"): the other three showed the tortures of Sisyphus, Tantalus and Tityos. Only two of Ribera's series – this painting of Ixion and the painting of Tityos – still survive, both now in the Museo del Prado.

== Reception ==
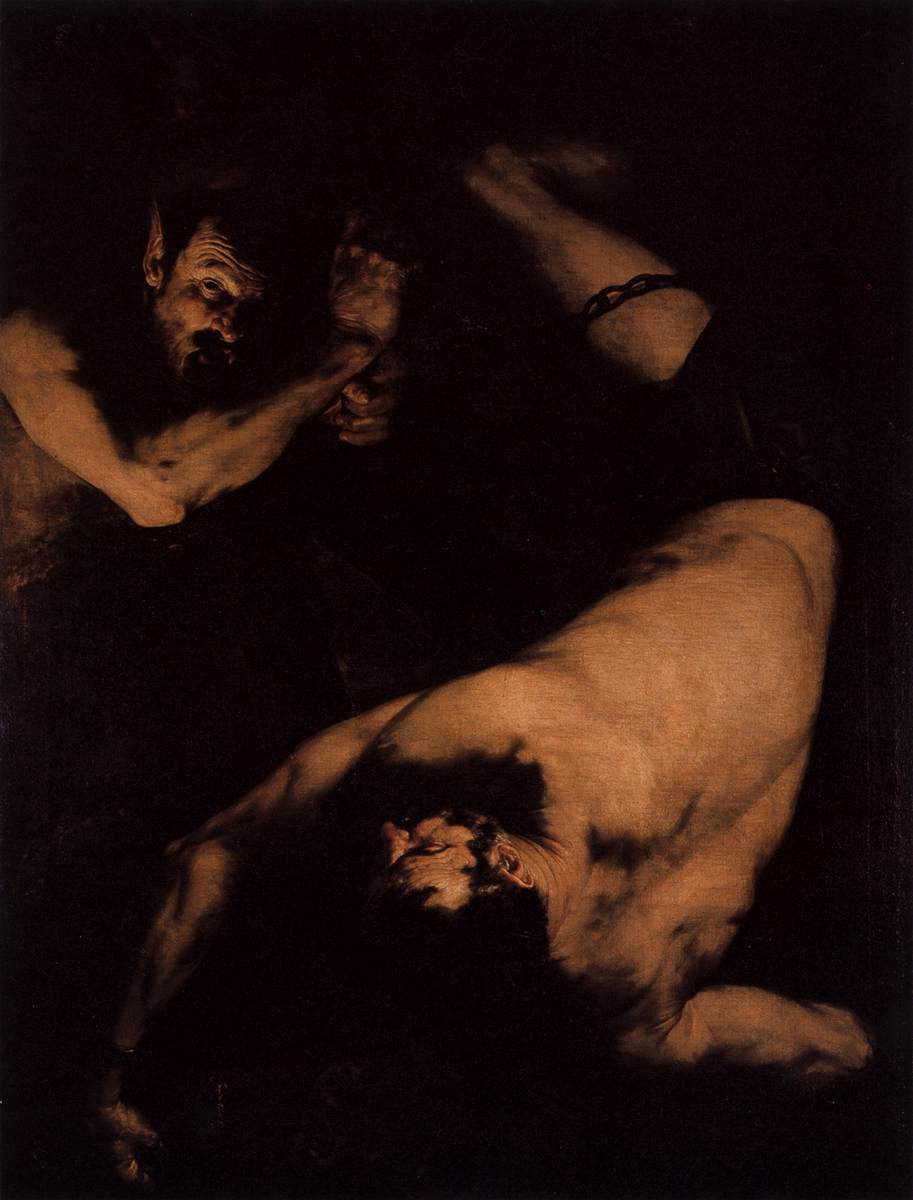
Ribera's Ixion in a vertical orientation

It is not known who commissioned Ribera's series of the "Furies", though its large format and theme of torture inflicted on rebels against just authority suggest a royal commission. All four paintings were sold in 1634 by the Marquesa de Charela (mother of Maria de Charela, who was a mistress of Philip IV of Spain and mother of his short-lived illegitimate son Fernando Francisco Isidro de Austria), and bought by Jerónimo de Villanueva, protonotary of the Council of Aragon, for the Spanish royal collection. They were displayed at the Royal Alcázar of Madrid, and Ixion and Tityus were moved the Buen Retiro Palace, where they remained until they were transferred to the Prado after it was founded in 1819. Ribera's paintings of Sisyphus and Tantalus are lost, possibly among the 500 works destroyed in the 1734 fire at the Royal Alcázar.

The art historian Jonathan Brown has suggested that the painting of Ixion was intended to be displayed in a vertical format, so the satyr appears in a more normal upright position and the composition appears more balanced, but the placement of the signature implies a horizontal format.

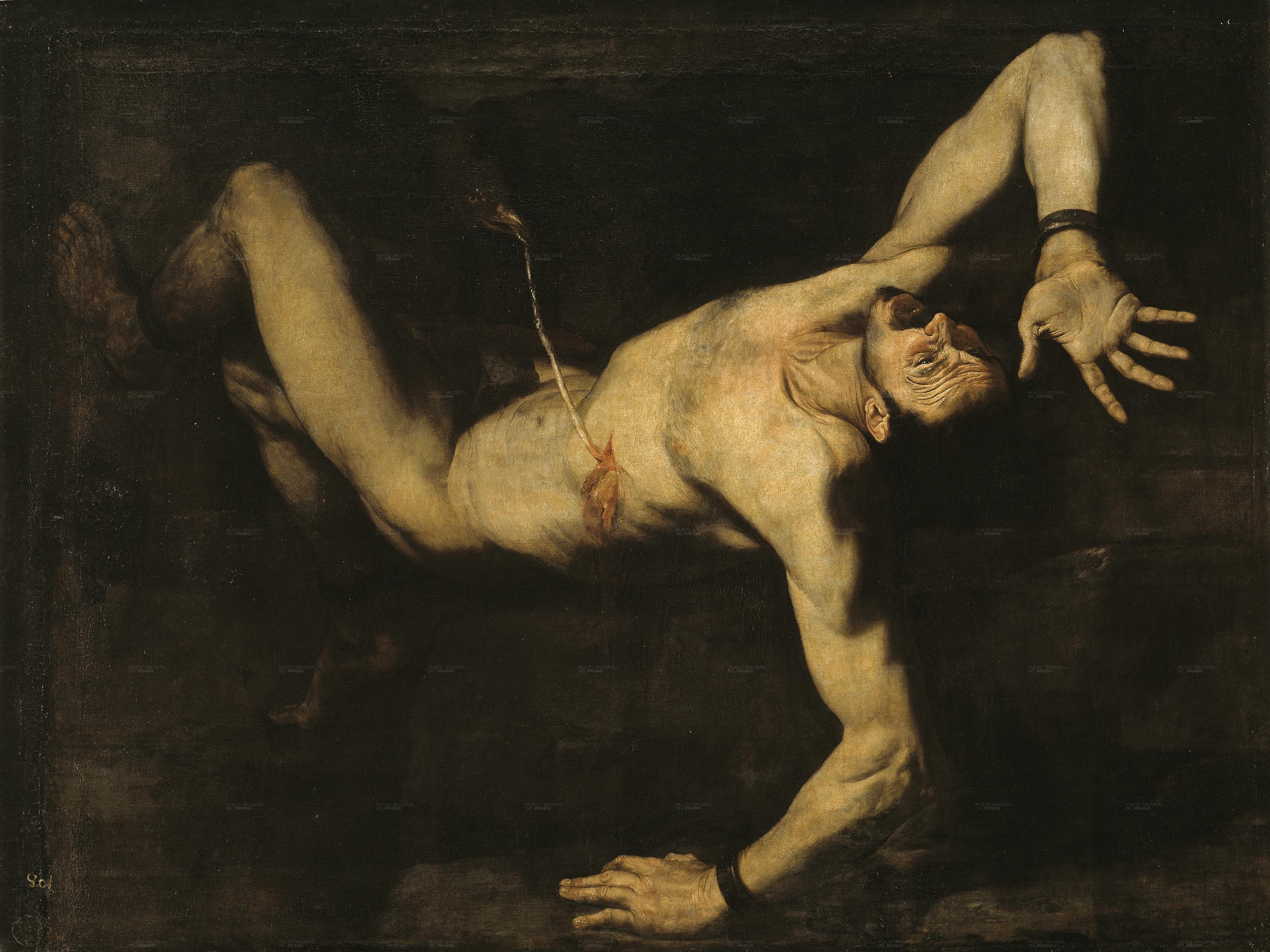
Ribera, Tityos, 1632, Prado

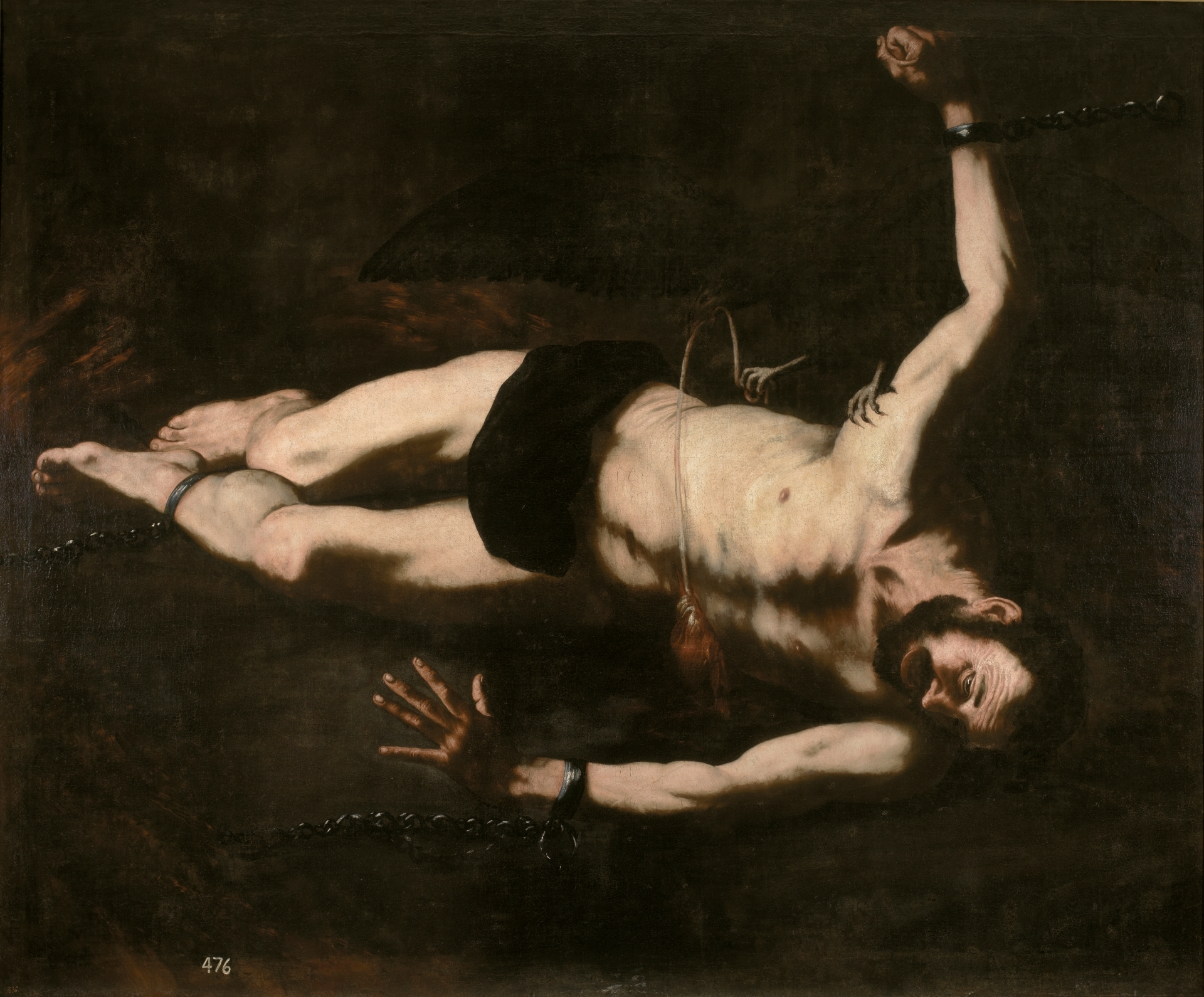
Later copy of the earlier version of Ribera's Tityus

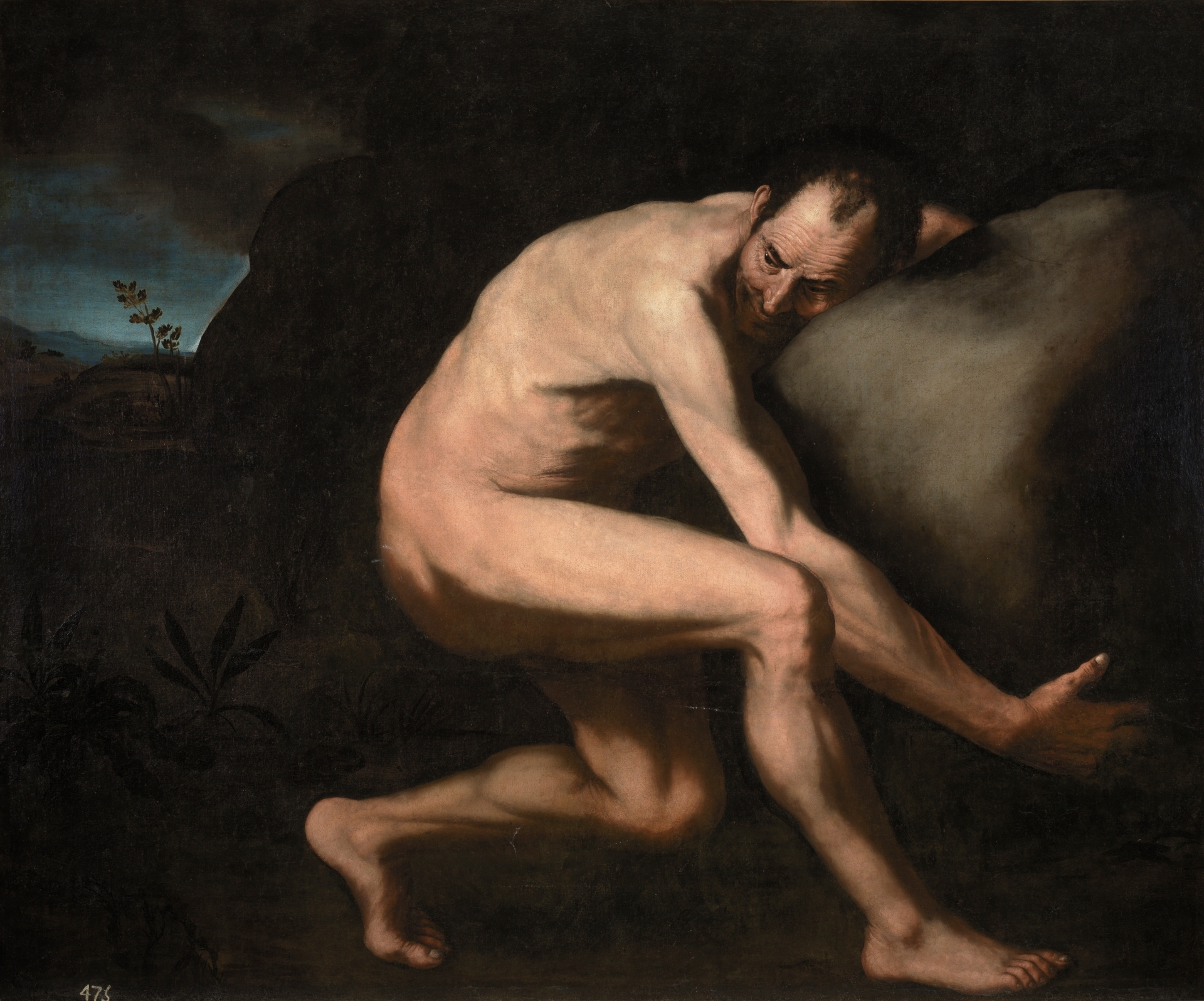
Later copy of the earlier version of Ribera's Sisyphus
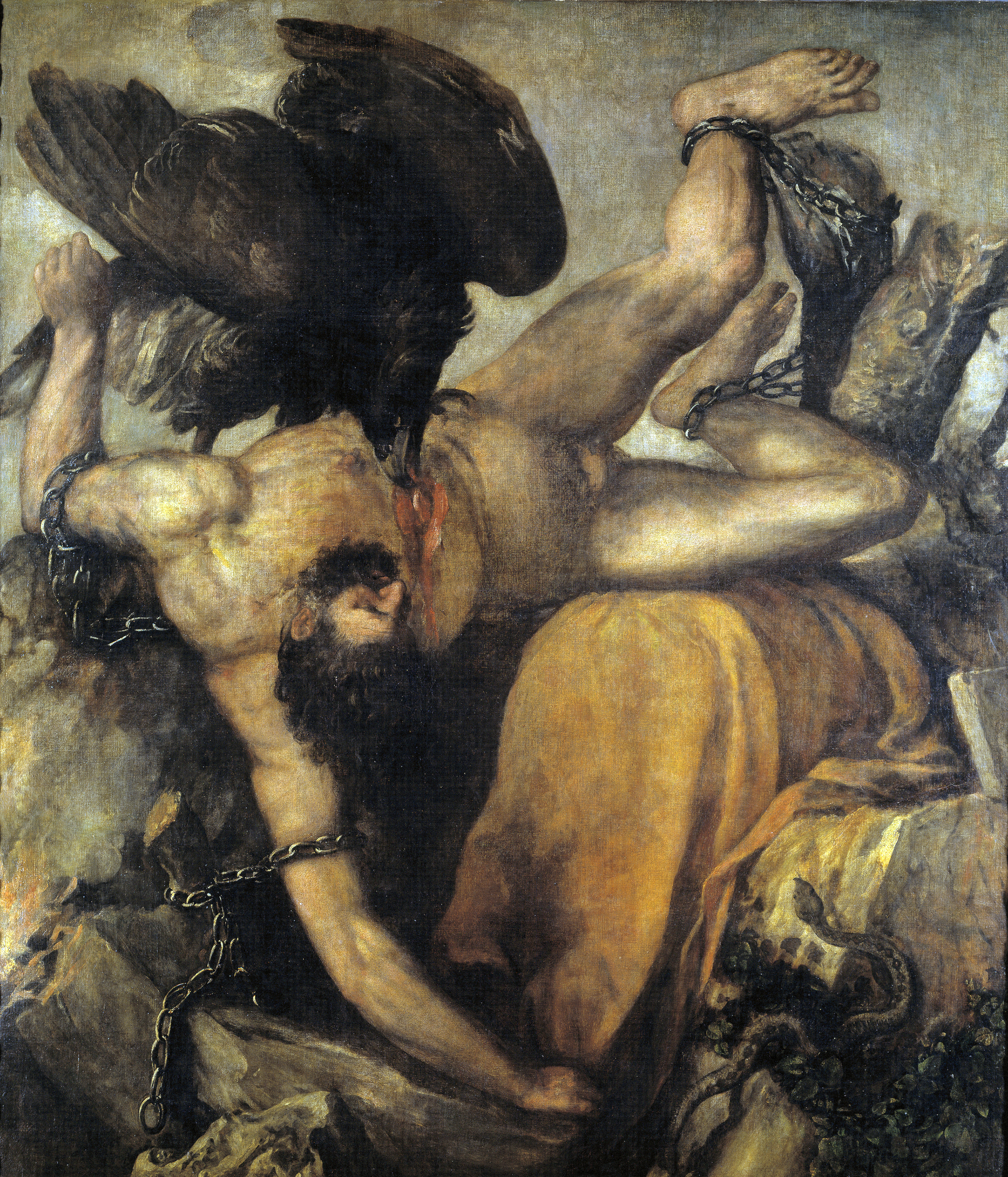
Titian, Tityus, 1565, Prado

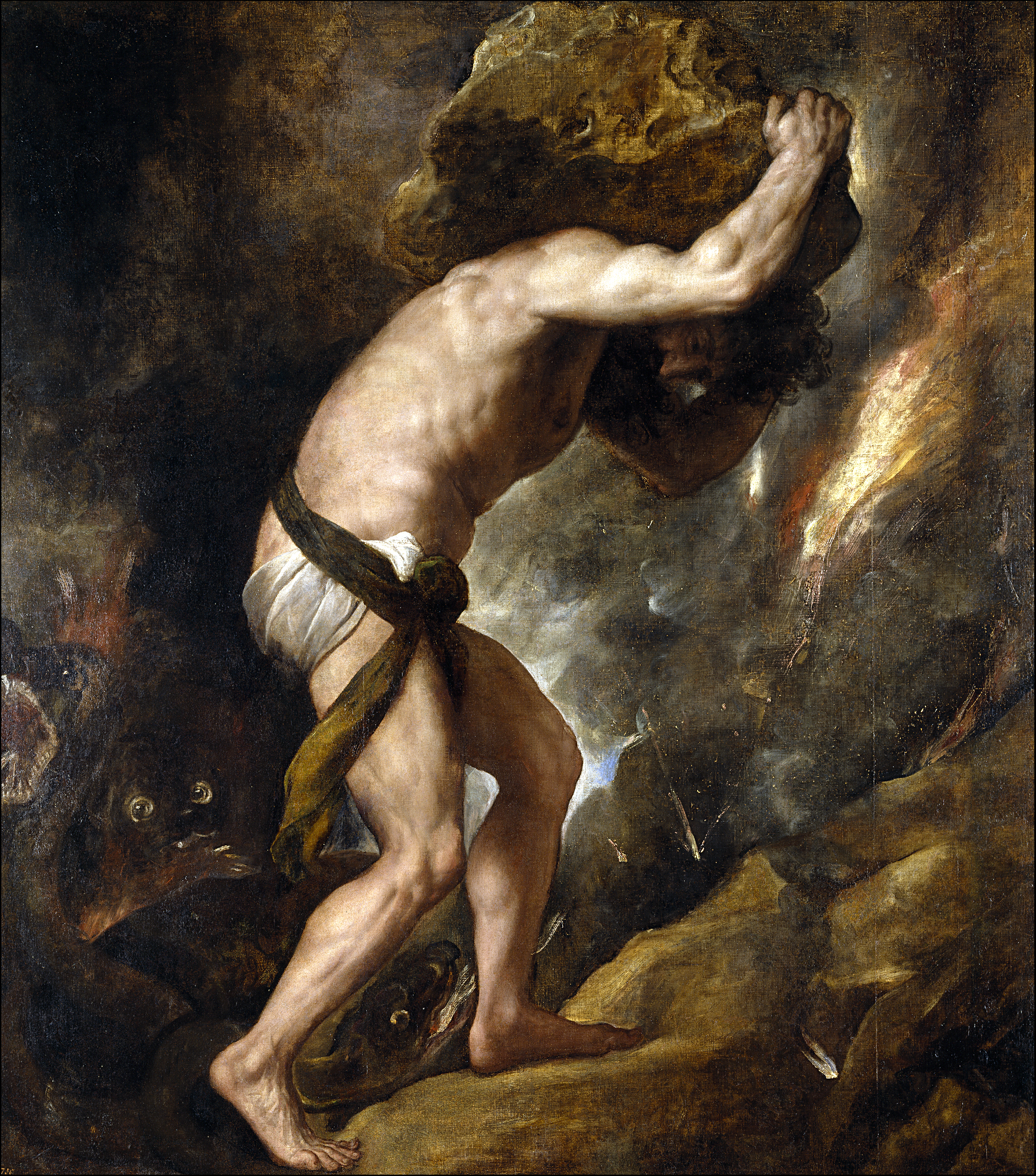
Titian, Sisyphus, 1548–1549, Prado

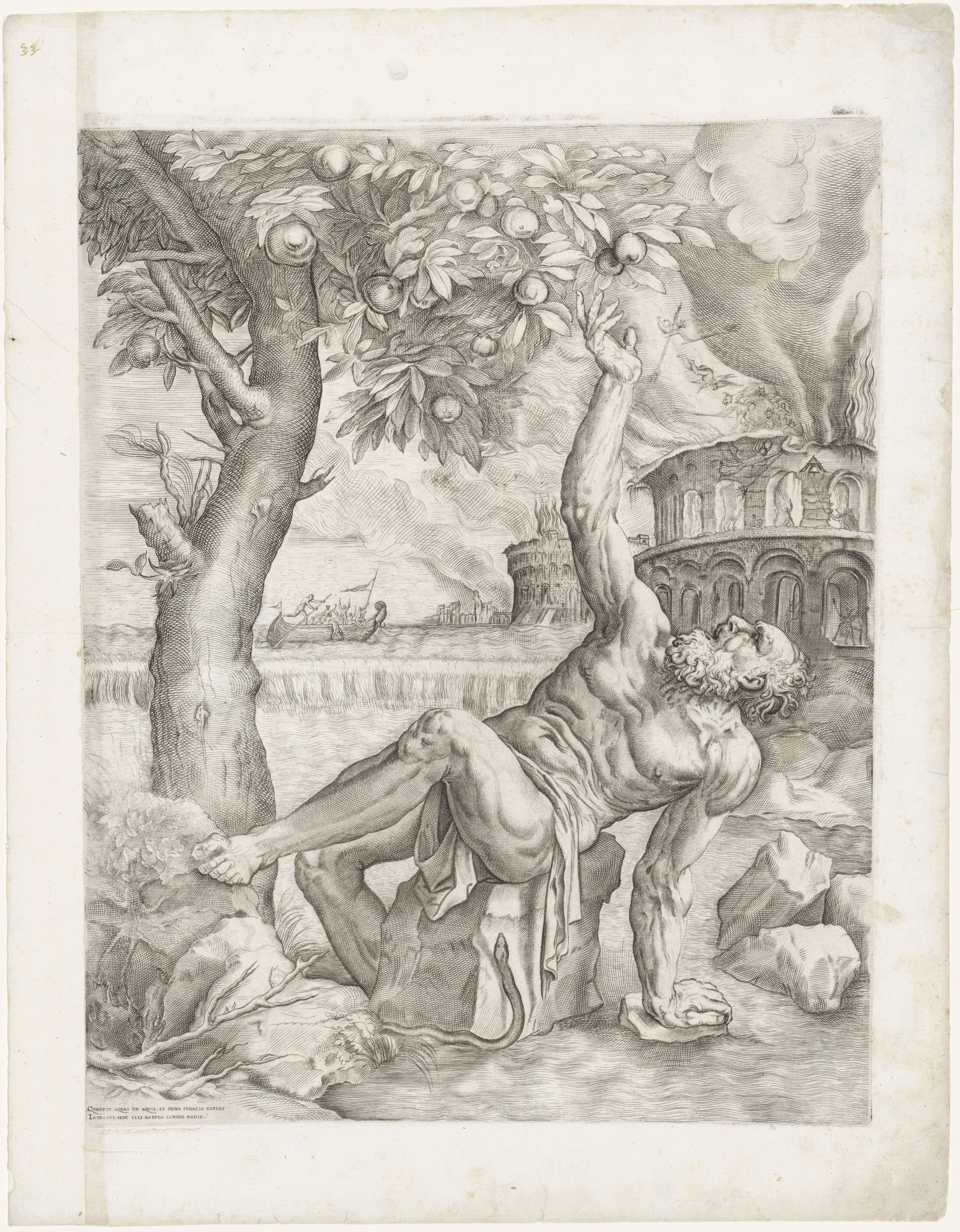
Engraving of Titian's Tantalus, by Giulio Sanuto, c.1565
