= Sisyphus (Titian) =

Painting by Titian

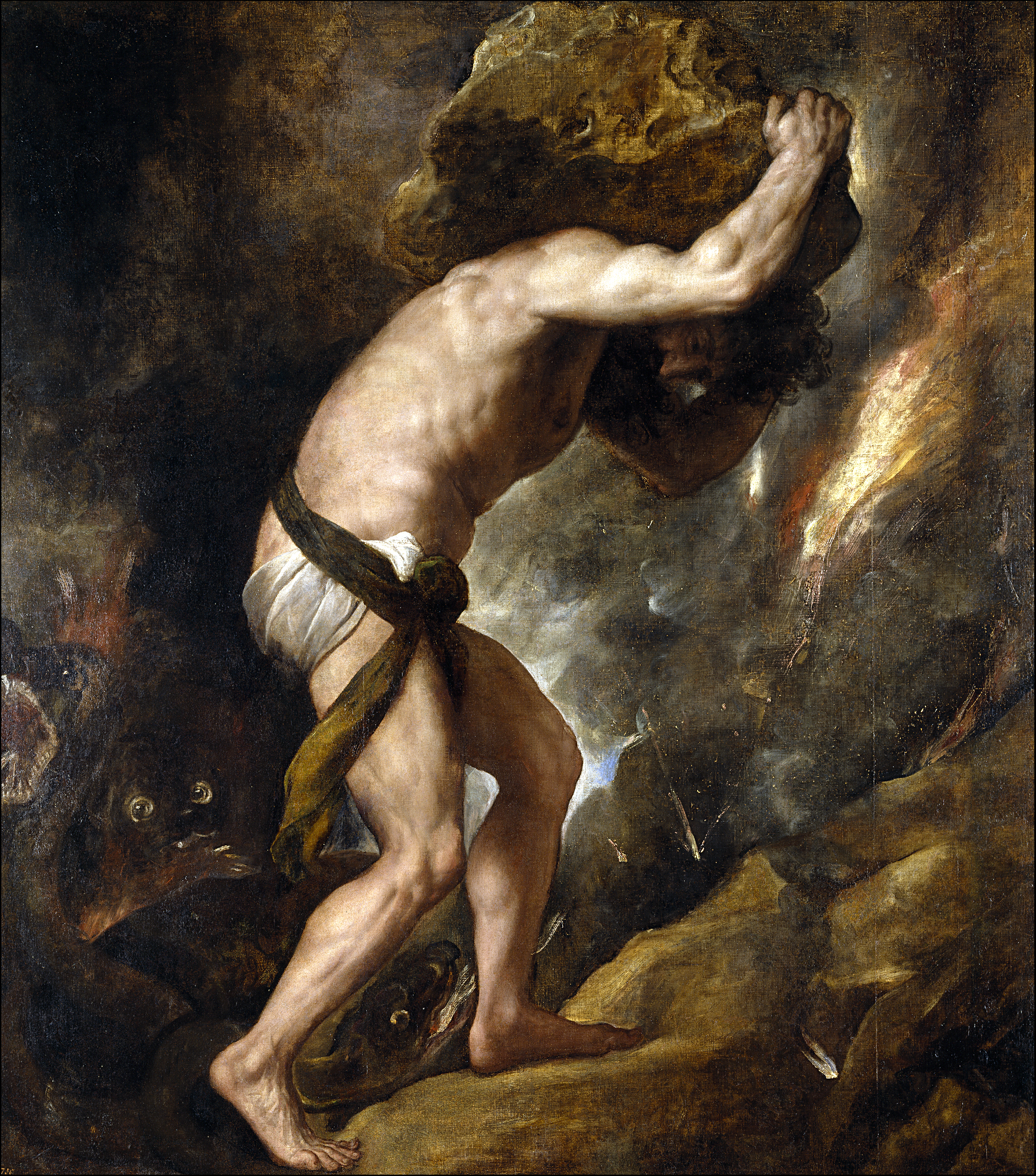
- Artist: Titian
- Year: 1548–1549
- Medium: Oil on canvas
- Dimensions: 237 cm × 216 cm (93 in × 85 in)
- Location: Museo del Prado; Madrid

Sisyphus (Spanish: Sísifo) is an oil on canvas painting by the Venetian master Titian, made in 1548-1549. It is in the collection of the Museo del Prado, in Madrid.

== Subject ==
From Homer onwards Sisyphus was famed as the craftiest of men. In the underworld Sisyphus was compelled to roll a big stone up a steep hill; but before it reached the top of the hill the stone always rolled down, and Sisyphus had to begin all over again. The subject was a commonplace of ancient writers, and Titian's source was a passage in Ovid's Metamorphoses, which recounts the eternal sufferings of several personages in the underworld:

Thither, leaving her abode in heaven, Saturnian Juno endured to go; so much did she grant to her hate and wrath. When she made entrance there, and the threshold groaned beneath the weight of her sacred form, Cerberus reared up his threefold head and uttered his threefold baying. The goddess summoned the Furies, sisters born of Night, divinities deadly and implacable. Before hell's closed gates of adamant they sat, combing the while black snakes from their hair. When they recognized Juno approaching through the thick gloom, the goddesses arose. This place is called the Accursed Place. Here Tityos offered his vitals to be torn, lying stretched out over nine broad acres. Thy lips can catch no water, Tantalus, and the tree that overhangs ever eludes thee. Thou, Sisyphus, dost either push or chase the rock that must always be rolling down the hill again. There whirls Ixion on his wheel, both following himself and fleeing, all in one; and the Belides, for daring to work destruction on their cousin-husbands, with unremitting toil seek again and again the waters, only to lose them.

== History ==
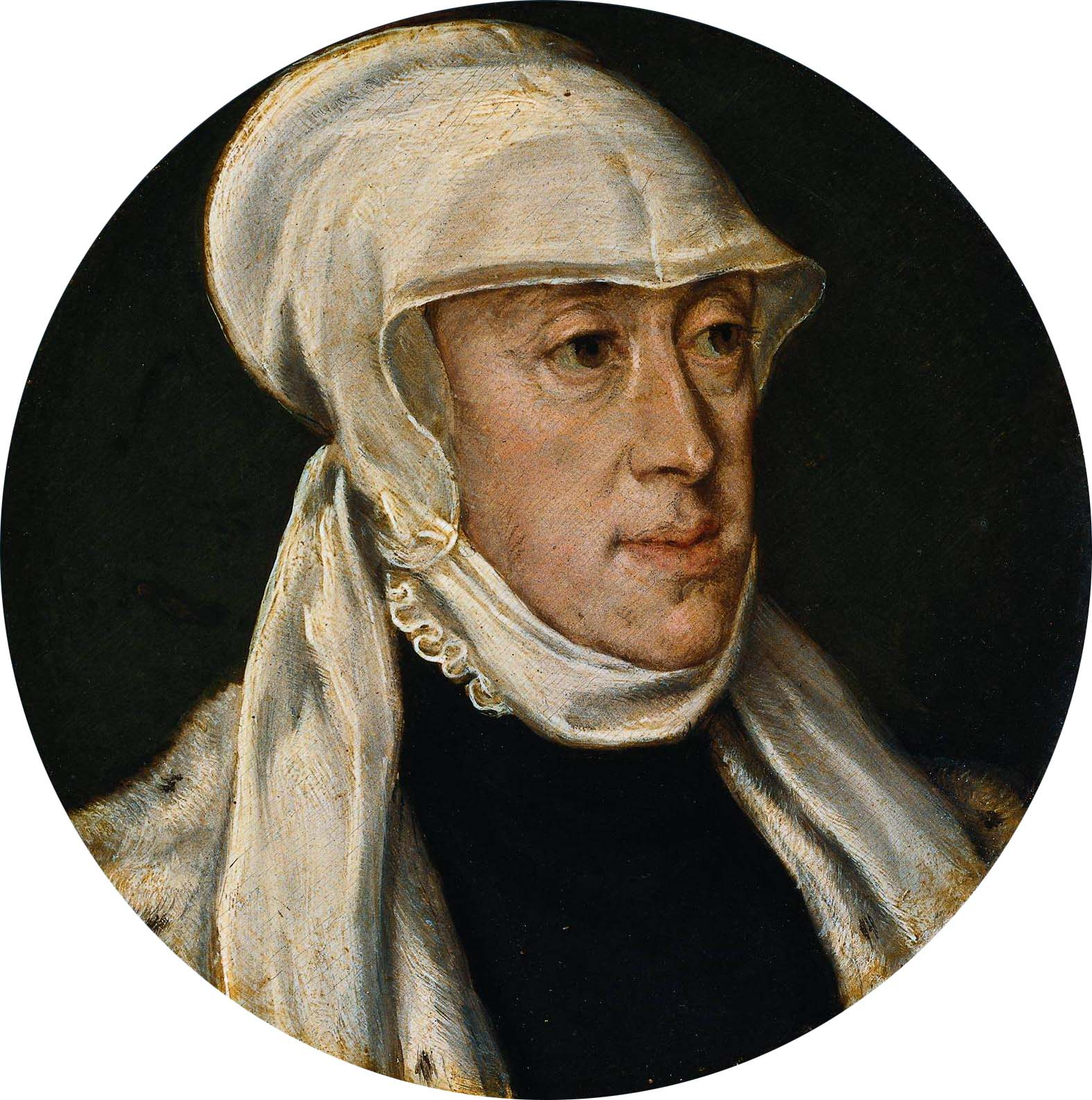
Netherlandish copy of Titian's lost portrait of Mary of Hungary (c. 1550)

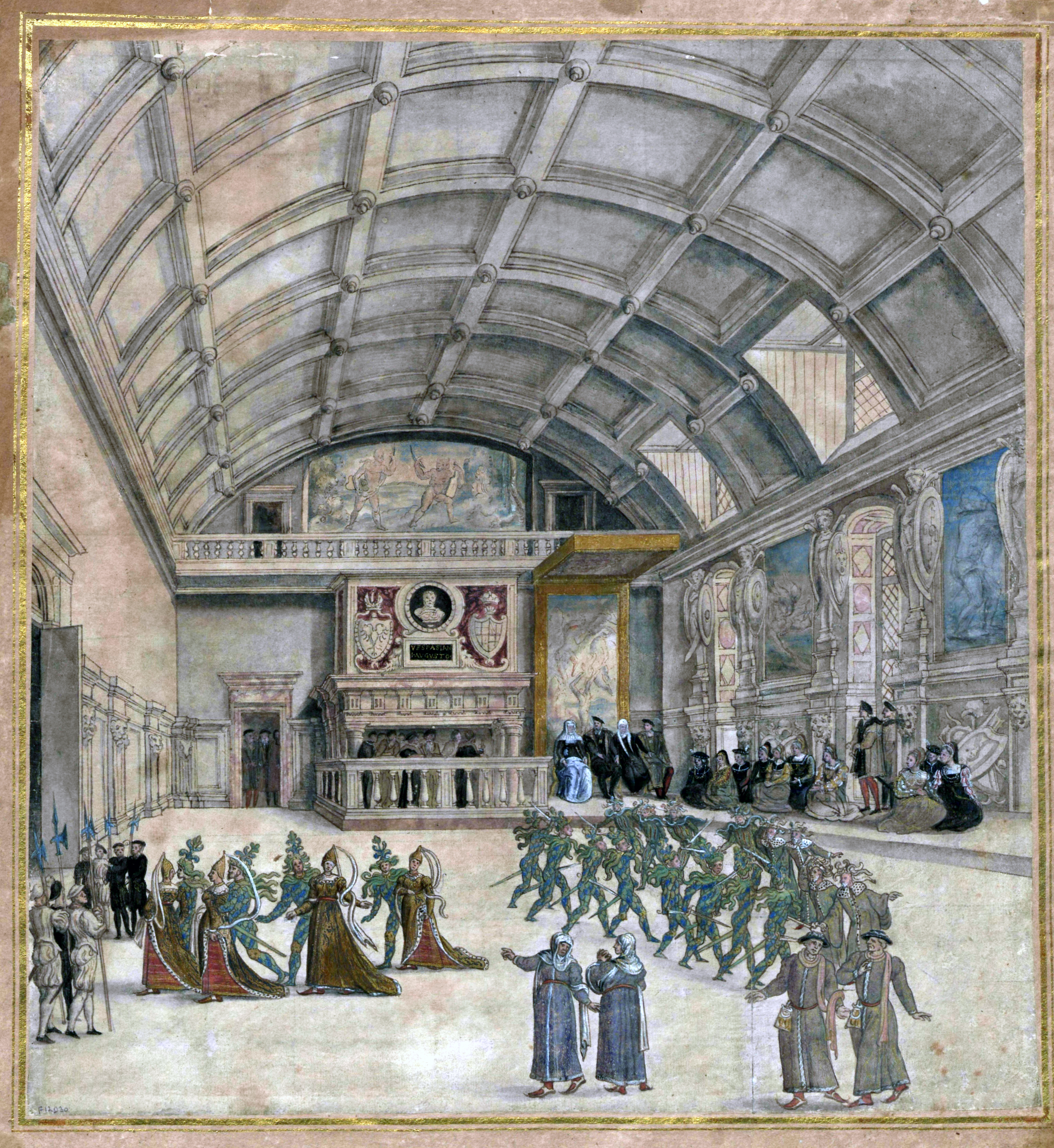
Mary of Austria receiving Charles V in the large hall of Binche Palace, constructed between 1546 and 1548. Drawing by an unknown Flemish artist (c. 1550)

On his first visit to Augsburg Titian received a new commission from Charles V's sister, Queen Mary of Hungary. Titian had to execute two or three large pictures, which should represent Tantalus, (Note: According to the Prado the Tantalus was by Coxcie.) Sisyphus and Tityus. (Note: Gronau and Ricketts mention another picture by Titian, the Prometheus, which is sometimes confused with the Tityus.) Two of them were painted in the first half of 1549; for they already adorned the Great Hall of the Summer Palace of Binche, for which the Queen evidently had destined them, in the August of the same year when Philip was her guest in the Low Countries. However, the last picture of this series, the Tityus, was not executed till much later, in about 1553.

The Queen took the collection of pictures (some by Titian and some by other hands) with her to Spain; in the sixteenth century they hung in the Alcázar at Madrid, and gave to the room its name, Pieza de las Furias, which may be translated "the room of the Forces". In course of time the Tantalus was lost, and the Tityus and Sisyphus, still remaining in the Prado, were once supposed, on the strength of ancient testimony, (Note: In the seventeenth century the Sisyphus and Prometheus are mentioned as copies by Sánchez Coello; in later inventories they reappear as original works.) to be copies by the hand of Sánchez Coello. Georg Gronau writes, "If so Coello must have worked with the highest skill in imitation of Titian's style. The two pictures really display all the bold design, the touch, and the colouring of Titian, and should be reckoned among his finest original creations." Charles Ricketts says they are very properly ascribed to Titian instead of being described as copies by the "cold, bad colourist", Sánchez Coello.

== Analysis ==
Georg Gronau imagines the Pieza de las Furias as it must once have been:

We can still imagine the general effect of the room when the pictures adorned it. Four colossal single figures (each picture measures more than two metres square), superhuman in form, struggling in torment, with a grand gloomy background suited to their dark-coloured bodies. Sisyphus is trying to push his rock up the mountain height; cliffs encircle him, and a whirlwind blows the flames of the underworld up around him. Prometheus (Note: Tityus.) lies stretched out over masses of mountain rock, of which he seems to have almost become a part; one arm hangs down over the cliff, his body is shrinking and writhing. It is as if Titian in these human forms would symbolise the struggles of the forces of nature. In drawing the masses of rock the remembrance of the mountains of his early home no doubt assisted him.

Charles Ricketts describes the two surviving pictures by Titian:

In these Titian reverts to the bold foreshortening of his Santo Spirito Ceilings. Both have been darkened by the smoke of one of those countless fires which have devastated the collections of the Spanish house, the colour-scheme of the 'Prometheus' now suggesting the rust of iron. This superb work anticipates the more broken and febrile handling of the following decade, and without documentary evidence I should have been inclined to ascribe it to a later period.

== Provenance ==
- 1700—Royal Collection (Royal Alcázar, Madrid), no. 3;
- 1747–1818—New Royal Palace, Madrid, no. 32;
- 1819–present—Museo del Prado, Madrid, no. P000426.

== Gallery ==
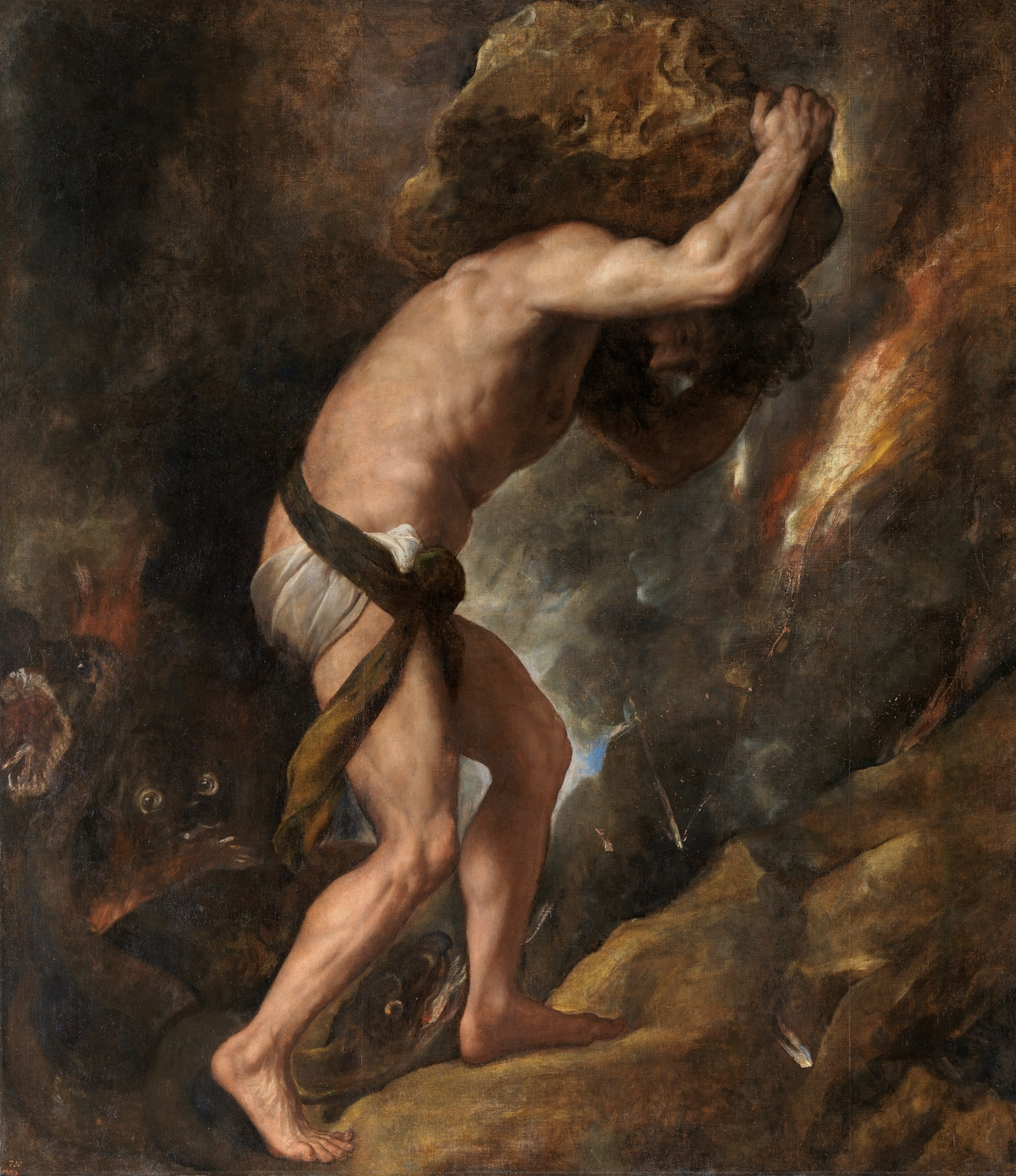
Titian: Sisyphus (1549)

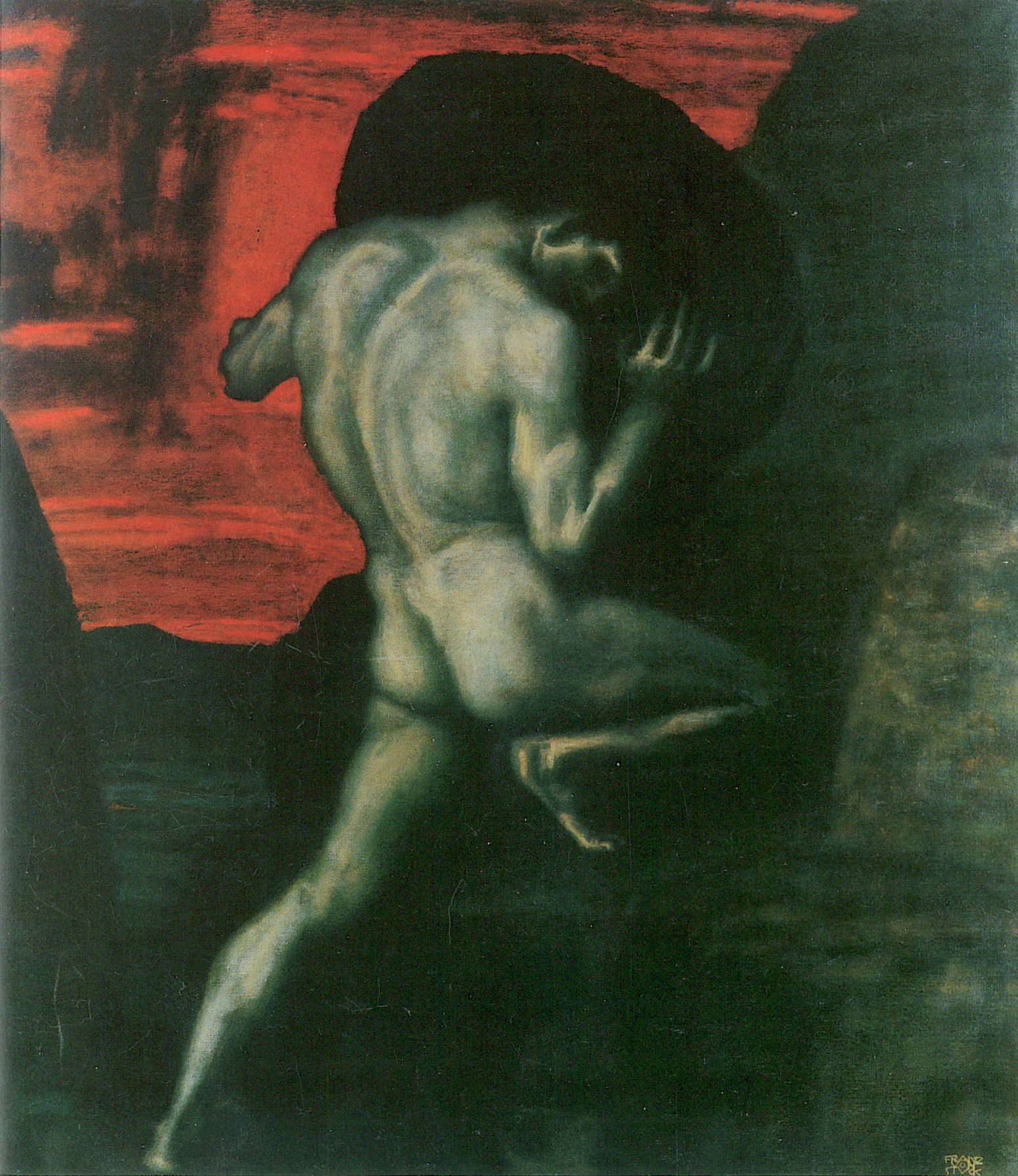
Franz Stuck: Sisyphus (1920)

== See also ==
- List of works by Titian
- The Myth of Sisyphus

== Sources ==
- Falomir Faus, Miguel (2003). "Sisyphus". Museo Nacionel del Prado. Retrieved 21 August 2022.

Attribution:
