= The Punishment of Tityus (Michelangelo) =

Drawing by Michelangelo

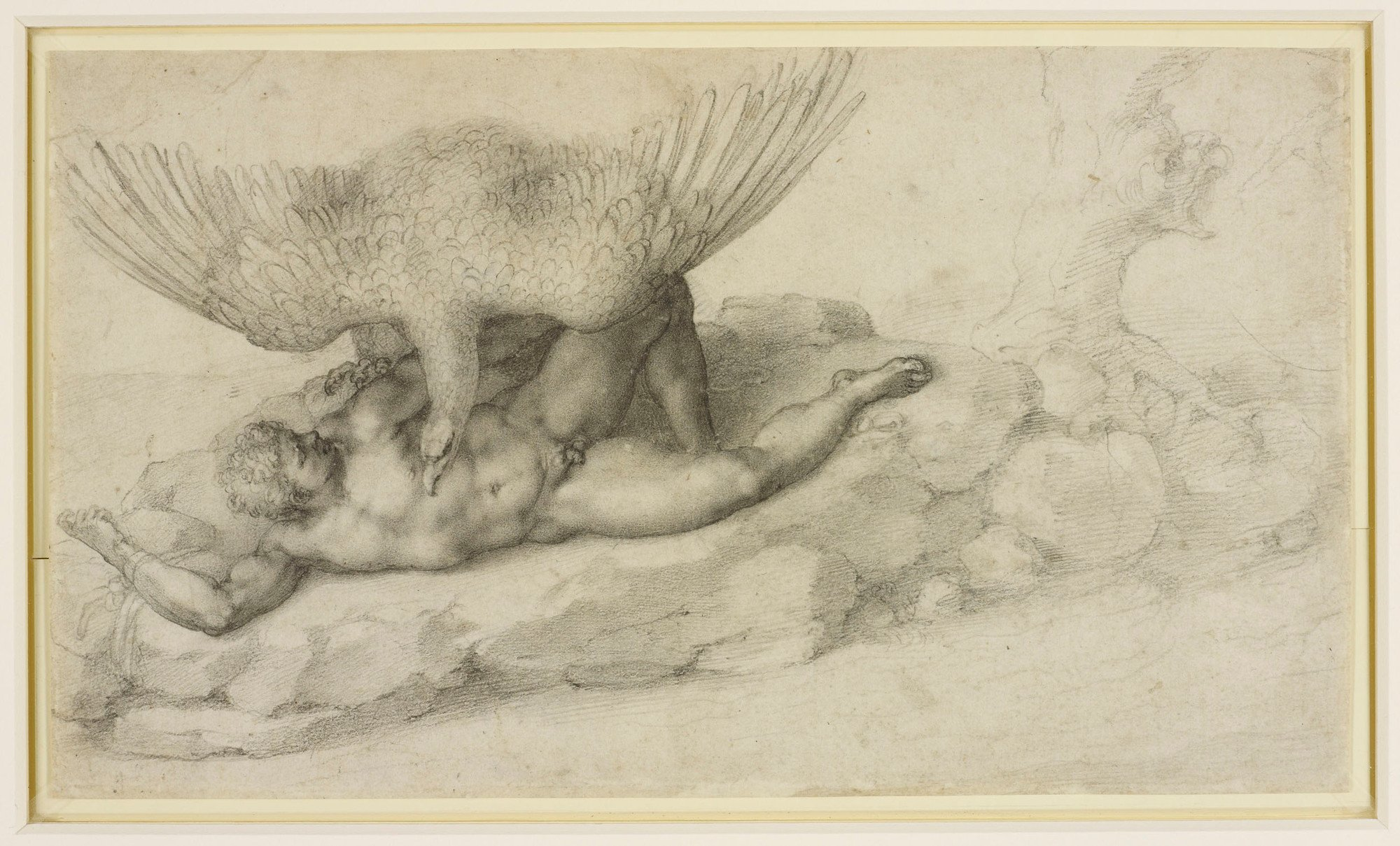
- Artist: Michelangelo
- Year: 1532
- Medium: Black chalk; charcoal on the verso
- Dimensions: 19 cm × 33.0 cm (7.5 in × 13.0 in)
- Location: Royal Collection
- Accession: RCIN 912771

The Punishment of Tityus is a drawing by the Italian Renaissance artist Michelangelo.

== Description ==
The drawing shows the mythical giant Tityus tied down on a large rock; on the top of the rock seems to be some kind of plant or tree trunk with roots. The trunk appears to have a human face in profile its his mouth fully open as if in a scream. The rock is the only indication of a location as the foreground and background remain blank except for a horizon line. The body of Tityus is twisted with his head back while his right arm is tied above his head and his left arm is assumed to be tied by his hip because the actual hand is not visible; Tityus's right leg lies flat while his left leg is up in a right-degree angle. Above Tityus is a vulture that is the about the size of a human. The vulture leans over the twisted body of Tityus with its wing almost fully extended on both sides and its head inching closer to the midsection of Tityus. According to myth, vultures torture Tityus by eating his liver every day; it regenerates every night.

== Tommaso dei Cavalieri ==
The Tityus drawing is one of several presentation drawings that Michelangelo gave to Tommaso dei Cavalieri. Cavalieri was a young Roman noble who became a very close friend to Michelangelo from 1532 up until Michelangelo's death in 1564.

The relationship between the two men has been scrutinized by scholars because of the large volume of correspondence between them. Michelangelo wrote many letters to Cavalieri along with poetry and the previously mentioned drawings. In the many sonnets he wrote to Cavalieri, Michelangelo referred to the "immeasurable love" that he carried for young nobleman; he even used Cavalieri's name in a pun to describe his affections stating, "I am held prisoner by an armed Cavalier".

== Possible homoeroticism ==
The drawings Michelangelo created for Cavalieri were complete and finished works of art. Michelangelo gave him the first set of drawings in 1532. This grouping is made up of the drawings Tityus and Ganymede. Scholars have interpreted the two drawings in this grouping to have homoerotic undertones. For example, the character of Tityus from mythology tried to rape Leto, Apollo's mother. For his punishment, Tityus was chained to a rock in Hades so that two vultures could eternally peck out his liver. In this framework, the drawing could be interpreted as a representation of pining and a love that will never be realized. Since the liver is continuously pecked out only to grow back again for all of eternity and the liver is often referred to as the "seat of the passions", the scene could refer to Michelangelo's unrequited love for Cavalieri.

A similar homoerotic interpretation could be made for the Ganymede drawing. In mythology, Ganymede was a cupbearer for Zeus. Zeus fell into such lust for the young cupbearer that he took on the form of an eagle to sweep Ganymede off to Mount Olympus to be with him. In this context, Ganymede could represent the young Cavalieri and the eagle could represent the mature and overpowering Michelangelo. The scene could be a visual representation of Michelangelo's physical desire for Cavalieri.

It would make sense that Michelangelo would use such drawings, sonnets and letters to profess his affections because of the social stigma attached to homosexuality. Even though Florence did have a prevalent homosexual community, Michelangelo's faith would not allow him to be open about his feeling for the young nobleman. Also, Michelangelo had been accused numerous times of having affairs with other young men. The homoerotic drawings could have been a way for Michelangelo to express his feelings out of the public eye and away from gossip.

== Possible drawing aids ==
Another interpretation of this group of drawings is that they were didactic and created for the purposes of teaching Cavalieri how to draw. This interpretation stems from a comment from Vasari that Cavalieri was given these works "because he was learning to draw". Also, on the back of the Tityus drawing, the figure of Tityus has been redrawn into a representation of the Risen Christ. It was originally thought that Michelangelo had done the tracing on the back but some scholars now think that the Risen Christ was completed by Cavalieri as a drawing exercise. Cavalieri's hand has been more readily identifiable due to the discovery of several drawing by him including a copy of the Fall of Phaeton, which was another presentation drawing given to him by Michelangelo.

Another aspect of the drawings suggesting they were teaching tools is that all four of the presentation drawings given to Cavalieri (Tityus, Ganymede, The Fall of Phaeton, and The Dreamer) all have the main figure facing different directions. For example, Tityus has the figure with his head downward facing the left while the figure from The Dreamer has his head up and to the right. Also, the figure in Ganymede is ascending vertically while the figure from The Fall of Phaeton is falling upside down. These four drawings as a group show the body facing all four cardinal directions and could have served to show Cavalieri how to depict the nude male form in different basic positions.

== Conclusions ==
Michelangelo's presentation drawings for Cavalieri have been a topic of interest among scholars because of their highly finished nature and because of the implications that they might have about Michelangelo's sexuality. The drawings have been argued to be expressions of homoeroticism and also teaching tools for the purpose of instructing Cavalieri on how to draw. Also, Tityus has become of special interest among this grouping because of the depiction of the Risen Christ on the back; the purpose of this figure on the back and who drew it is not known.

== See also ==
- List of works by Michelangelo
