= Tityus (Titian) =

1549 painting by Titian

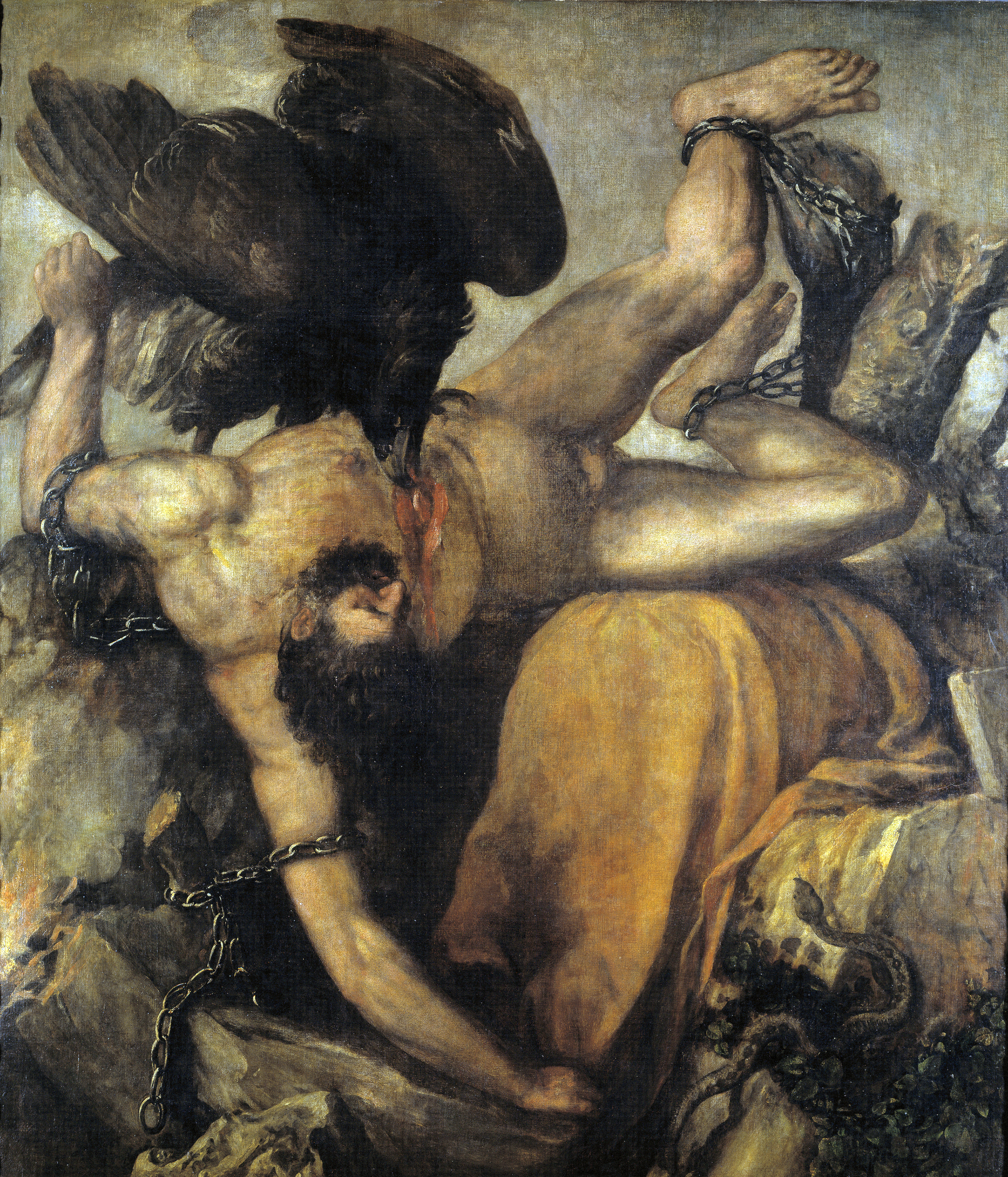
- Artist: Titian
- Year: 1549
- Medium: oil on canvas
- Dimensions: 253 cm × 217 cm (100 in × 85 in)
- Location: Museo del Prado; Madrid

Tityus is a mythological painting by Titian dating to 1549. It is held in the Museo del Prado, in Madrid. It shows the punishment of the giant Tityos from Greek mythology.

== Description ==
The painting narrates a Greek mythological episode involving Zeus' son by Elara, the giant Tityos. He had been sent, by Zeus' wife, the scorned goddess Hera, to rape Zeus' inamorata Leto, but was instead slain by Leto's children, Apollo and Artemis. Zeus punished his own son by condemning him to Hell, where he would suffer the eternal punishment described in the painting (in other versions there are two vultures torturing the giant). Since Tityos was immortal, the sentence is eternal.

In the painting, Titian paints the giant chained to the trunks of a tree, writhing while a vulture devours his liver (or intestines), which regenerate immediately afterwards, extending his suffering without end. In the lower part, a snake is depicted as a symbol of evil, a reflection of the sin committed by Tityos.

The painting shows the Mannerist style that is typical of Titian for this time. One of the characteristics of this style, the use of foreshortening, enhances the drama and violence of the episode, which is less usual in Titian, reinforcing its effect. There is a veiled comparison between Zeus and Charles V, and the effects of rebelling against the established power are highlighted.

The theme is recurrent in the history of art. The Renaissance art historian Giorgio Vasari cites Michelangelo as having made, among other subjects, a drawing of Tityos being eaten by an eagle as a gift to his friend Tommaso dei Cavalieri. This drawing belongs to the Royal Collection, in the United Kingdom, and is kept at Windsor Castle.
