= Elara (mythology) =

Daughter of Orchomenos and lover of Zeus

In Greek mythology, Elara /ˈɛlərə/, Elare or Alera (Ancient Greek: Ἐλάρα, Ἐλάραη or Ἀλέρα) was the daughter of King Orchomenus and mother of the giant Tityos by Zeus. In some accounts, she was described as the daughter of Minyas or Minos

== Myth ==
Zeus fell in love with Elara and hid her from his wife Hera's jealous rage by placing her deep beneath the Earth. This was where she gave birth to Tityos, a giant who is sometimes said to be the son of Gaia, the Earth goddess, for the reason being an earth-born (γηγενής gigenis "native") and brought up under the earth. It is further added that Elara died in labour because of the enormous size of her baby.

The cave through which Tityos was believed to have come to the surface of Earth was located on Euboea and referred to as Elarion.

== Eponymy ==
One moon of Jupiter is named Elara.

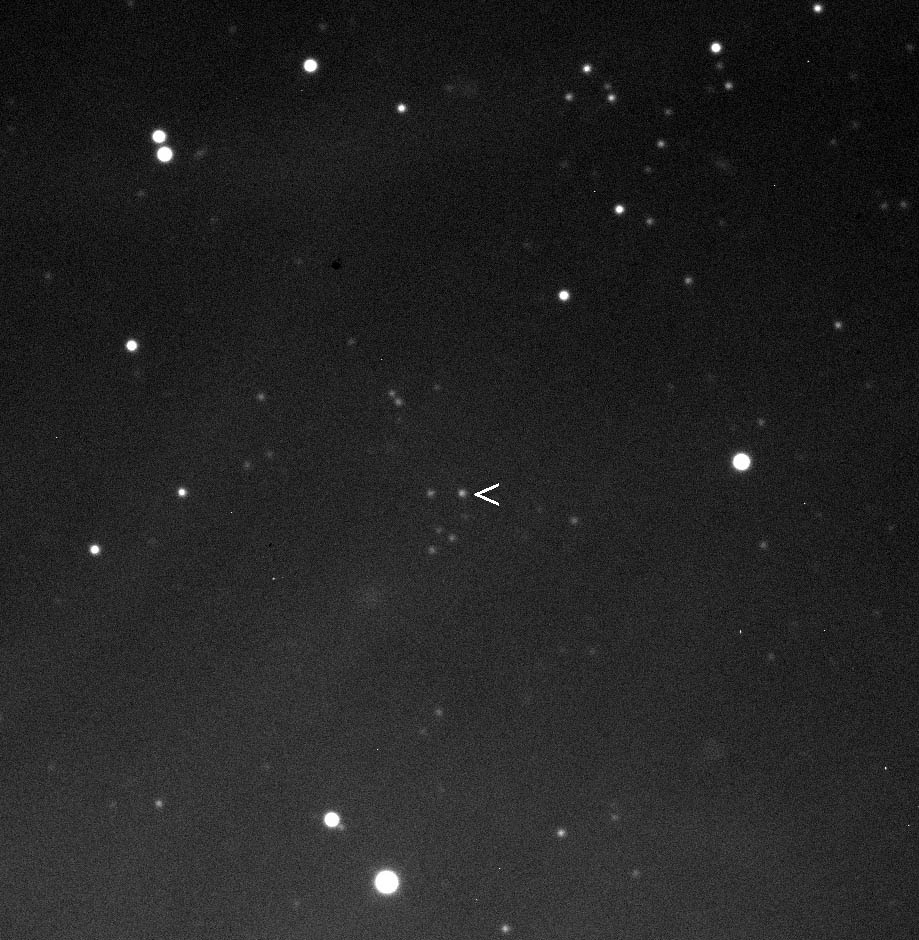
Moon Elara
