= The Fall of Phaeton (Michelangelo) =

Drawing by Michelangelo

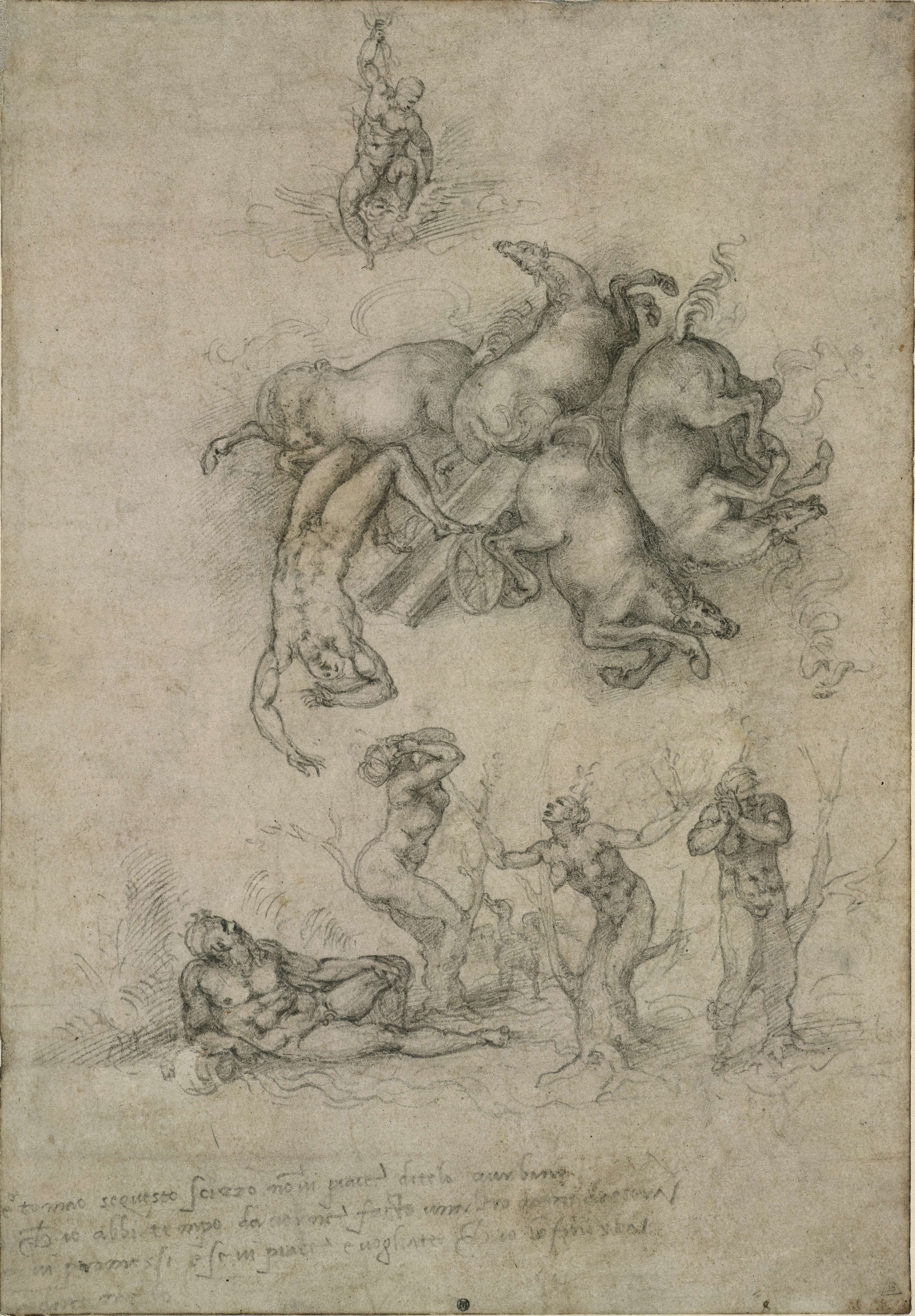

The Fall of Phaeton is a c.1533 charcoal on paper drawing of Apollo's son Phaeton from Ovid's Metamorphoses by Michelangelo, now in the British Museum in London.

== History ==
It was made for Tommaso dei Cavalieri, who the artist had met in 1532, with a dedication at the bottom calling it an unfinished presentation drawing and stating that (if dei Cavalieri did not like it) Michelangelo would finish it for him or make another the following evening. At the top is Jupiter hurling a thunderbolt. At the base is a thicket with two Heliades (who, looking at the sky, despair at their brother's fate and are transformed into poplars), Cycnus hiding his face in his hands, and the reclining river god Eridanos.

A second sheet on the same subject by the artist (now in the Royal Collection at Windsor Castle) was also produced for dei Cavalieri, for whom he drew a Rape of Ganymede and other subjects. On this sheet Cycnos' transformation into a swan is more explicit than that of the Heliades.
