= Tommaso dei Cavalieri =

Italian nobleman (d. 1587)

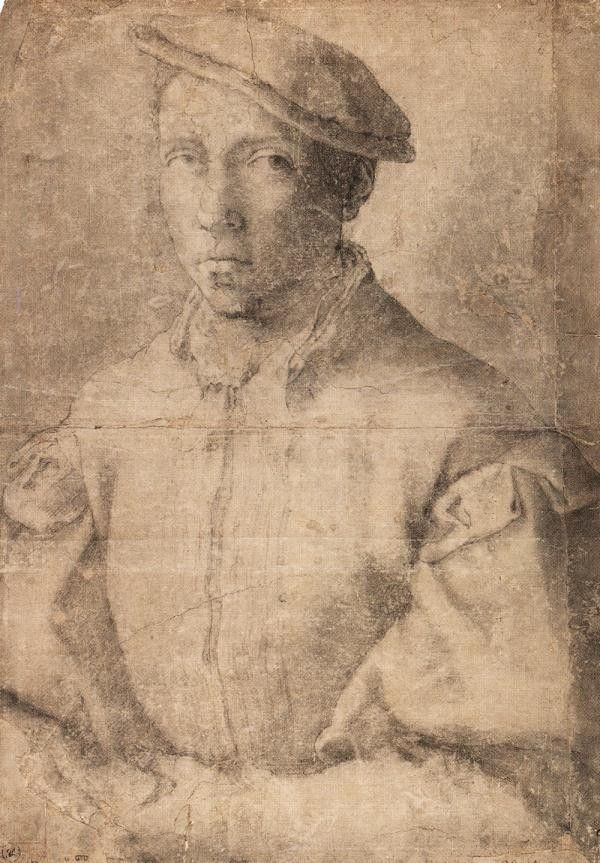
- Possible drawing of dei Cavalieri might be by Michelangelo
- Born: c. 1509–1519
- Died: 1587 (aged c. 72)
- Known for: Being the object of the greatest expression of Michelangelo's love
- Spouse: Lavinia della Valle (m. 1544; died 1553)
- Children: 2 (incl. Emilio)

Tommaso dei Cavalieri (c. 1509 – 1587) was an Italian nobleman, who was the object of the greatest expression of Michelangelo's love. Michelangelo was 57 years old when he met Cavalieri in 1532. The young noble was exceptionally handsome, and his appearance seems to have fit the artist's notions of ideal masculine beauty, for Michelangelo described him as "light of our century, paragon of all the world". The two men remained close to each other throughout their lives, and Cavalieri was present at the artist's death.

== Biography ==
Tommaso dei Cavalieri was the son of Cassandra Bonaventura and Mario de' Cavalieri. Cavalieri was born around 1509, but the exact date of his birth is unknown. In an official document translated by Gerda Panofsky-Soergel, mention is made that Cavalieri paid the stipend for the Mass in the memory of his brother Emilio on 6 September 1536. This is the only document that mentions the age of Cavalieri, and her translation states "he is older than 16, but younger than 25". Warren Kirkendale, in his book Emilio de' Cavalieri "Gentiluomo Romano", corrects Panofsky-Soergel's reading of the document and instead translates it to read that Cavalieri was "no more than 16", putting his birth likely in 1520 and meaning he was "but a boy of twelve" when he met Michelangelo.

Cavalieri's parents married in November 1509, and before Tommaso was born, they had one son, Emilio. After the deaths of his father in 1524 and his older brother, Emilio, in 1536, Tommaso became the official head of the Cavalieri household. His first position in Roman government was caporione of his neighbourhood of Sant'Eustachio, which he took in 1539. It was noted that compared to his peers, Cavalieri did not participate in civic government extensively, although he would serve in this position five times (in 1539, 1542, 1546, 1558, and 1562). Twice (in 1564 and 1571), he occupied the post of Conservatore, the highest-ranking office a Roman citizen could occupy.

Cavalieri married Lavinia della Valle in 1544 in Rome. Lavinia had been born sometime between 1527 and 1530. She was a daughter of Giulia Caffarelli and Lorenzo Stefano della Valle, and she was a cousin of Cardinal Andrea della Valle. The marriage of Tommaso and Lavinia was the continuation of a longstanding tradition of marriages between Cavalieri and della Valle family members. They had been related by marriage at least since the fifteenth century. The close connection of the families was shown during the Sack of Rome in 1527 when Tommaso dei Cavalieri had sought shelter in the palace of Cardinal Andrea della Valle, where Lavinia's mother also found refuge with three of her children (most likely Lavinia's older sisters, Orinzia, Polimnia, and Porzia).

The marriage of della Valle and Cavalieri produced two sons, Mario, probably born in 1548, and Emilio, born by 1552. Emilio would go on to become a renowned composer. The marriage lasted nine years, ending with della Valle's death in early November 1553. She was buried in the church of Santa Maria in Aracoeli, where both the Cavalieri and della Valle families had chapels.

Cavalieri was made one of the Convervatori in 1554, taking the position responsible for supervising construction at the Campidoglio that Michelangelo had begun restoration in 1538. Work on this complex project, involving the renovation of the existing Palazzo dei Conservatori and Palazzo Senatorio, as well as the construction of a third building, the Palazzo Nuovo, did not begin until 1542 and would not be fully realised until 1662. Cavalieri was co-director for construction from 1554 to 1575 and supervised the project through its most productive phase of development. Despite his sharing responsibility for the construction with Prospero Boccapaduli, Cavalieri is mentioned to have been primarily responsible for the realization of Michelangelo's designs, while Boccapaduli managed the financial and administrative tasks.

== Relationship with Michelangelo ==
Michelangelo Buonarroti met the young Tommaso dei Cavalieri during a stay in Rome in 1532. Although his contemporaries commented on his good looks and cultivated nature, no definite image of Michelangelo's Cavalieri has survived. Benedetto Varchi wrote that Cavalieri was of "incomparable beauty with graceful manners", and was "charming [in] demeanour".

Michelangelo became infatuated with the young Roman patrician. Vasari noted that "Infinitely more than any other friend, Michelangelo loved the young Tommaso", who became the object of Michelangelo's passion, his muse, and the inspiration for letters, numerous poems, and works of visual art. The pair would remain devoted to each other until Michelangelo's death in 1564.

The earliest surviving letter from Cavalieri to Michelangelo is dated to 1 January 1533. The letter gives clues to their budding relationship through a conversation about art. According to Cavalieri, they were united by a mutual love for art, and the letter refers to "Those works of mine that you have seen with your own eyes, and which have caused you to show me no small affection". According to Gayford (2013), "Whatever the strength of his feelings, Michelangelo’s relationship with Tommaso de'Cavalieri is unlikely to have been a physical, sexual affair. For one thing, it was acted out through poems and images that were far from secret. Even if we do not choose to believe Michelangelo’s protestations of the chastity of his behaviour, Tommaso’s high social position and the relatively public nature of their relationship make it improbable that it was not platonic".

=== Novel finished drawings ===
Michelangelo sent Cavalieri four highly-finished drawings, termed by Johannes Wilde presentation drawings. These were a new kind of drawing, completed works meant as presents, rather than sketches or studies. They, too, were greatly appreciated by Cavalieri, who was very sorry to have lent some of them to members of the papal curia. Giorgio Vasari stood on their great originality. The meaning of the drawings is not fully understood, although it is common for scholars to relate them to moralising themes or ideas about Neoplatonic love.

==== Gallery ====
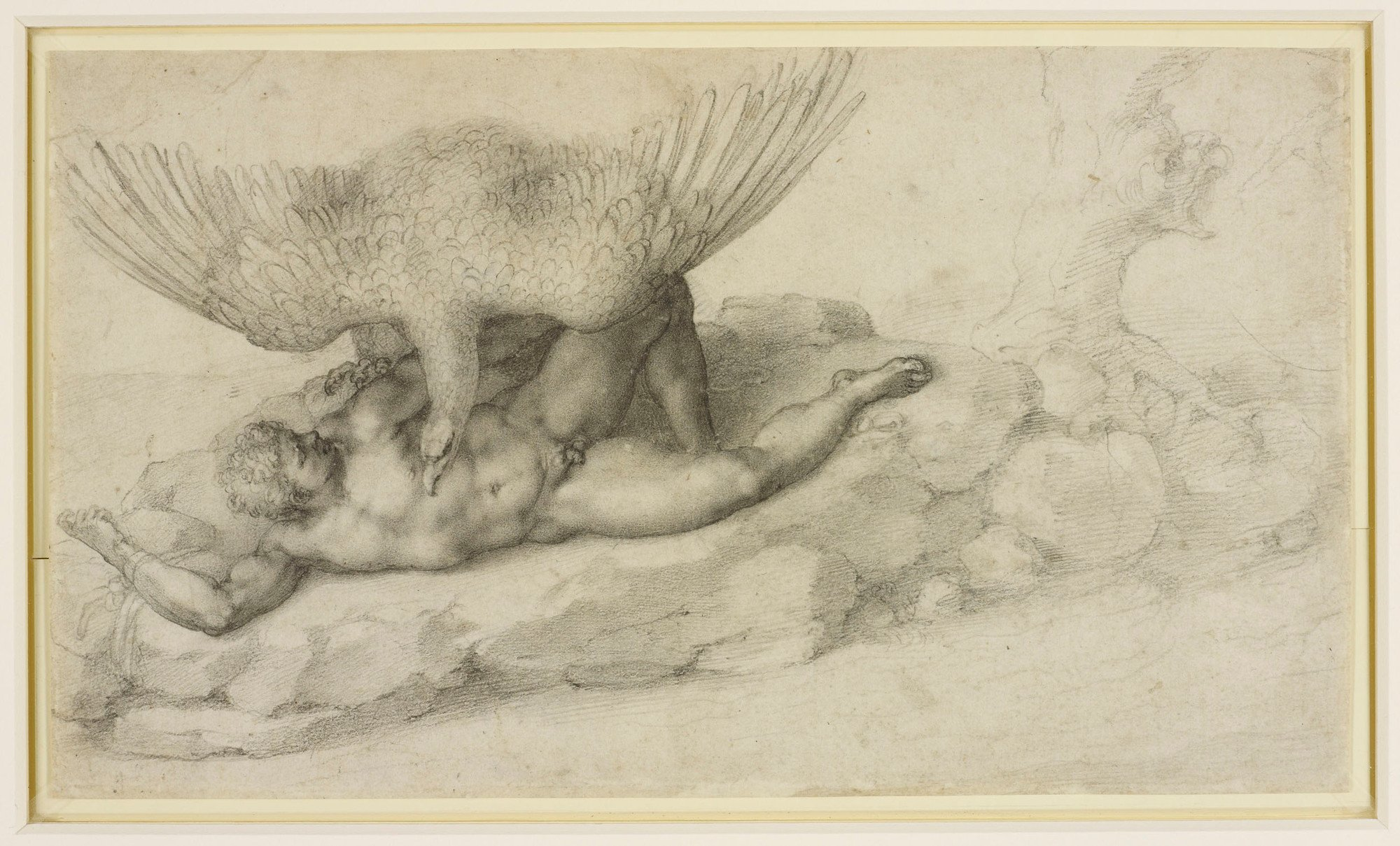
Michelangelo, Punishment of Tityus, c. 1532

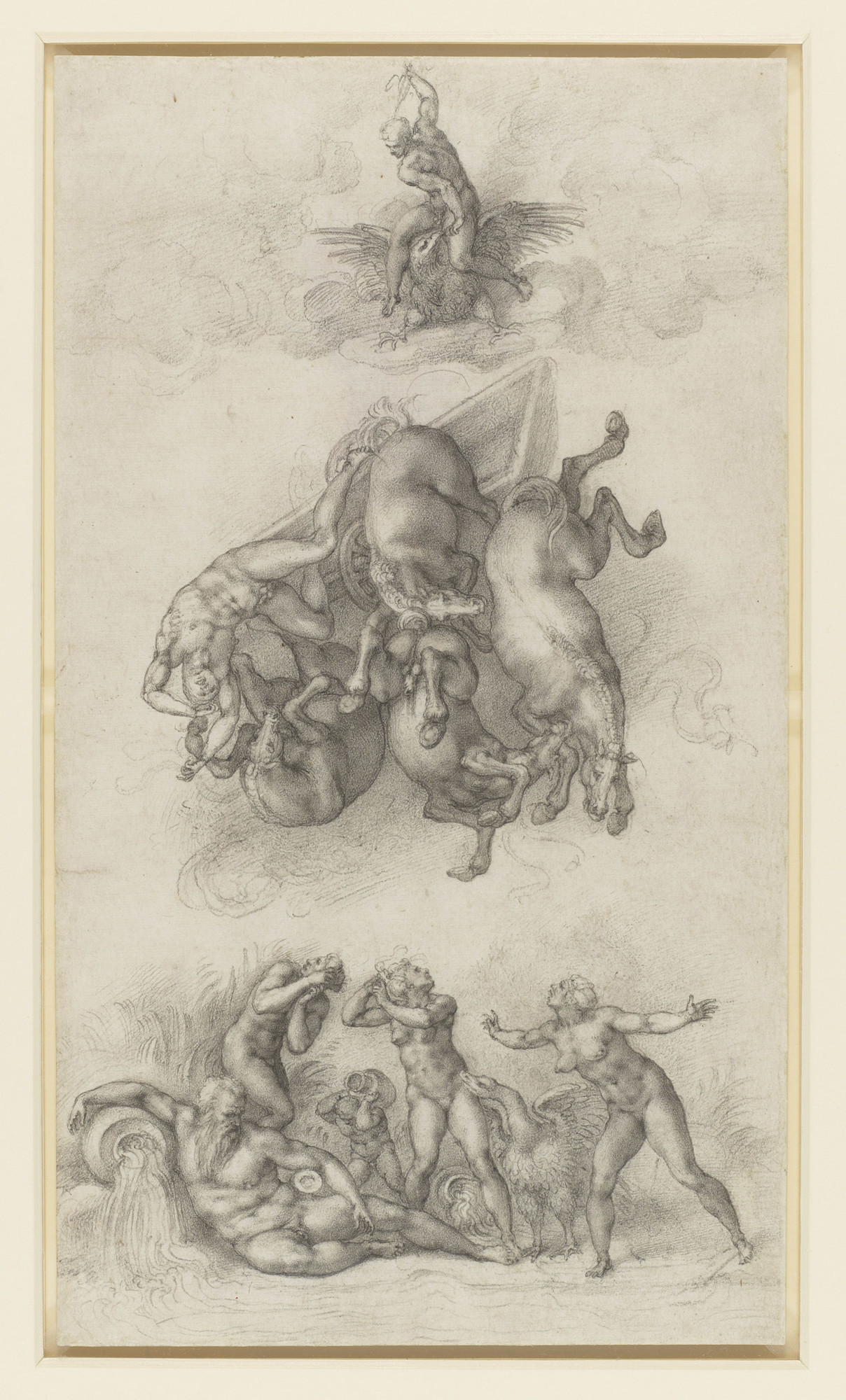
Michelangelo, The Fall of Phaeton, c. 1533

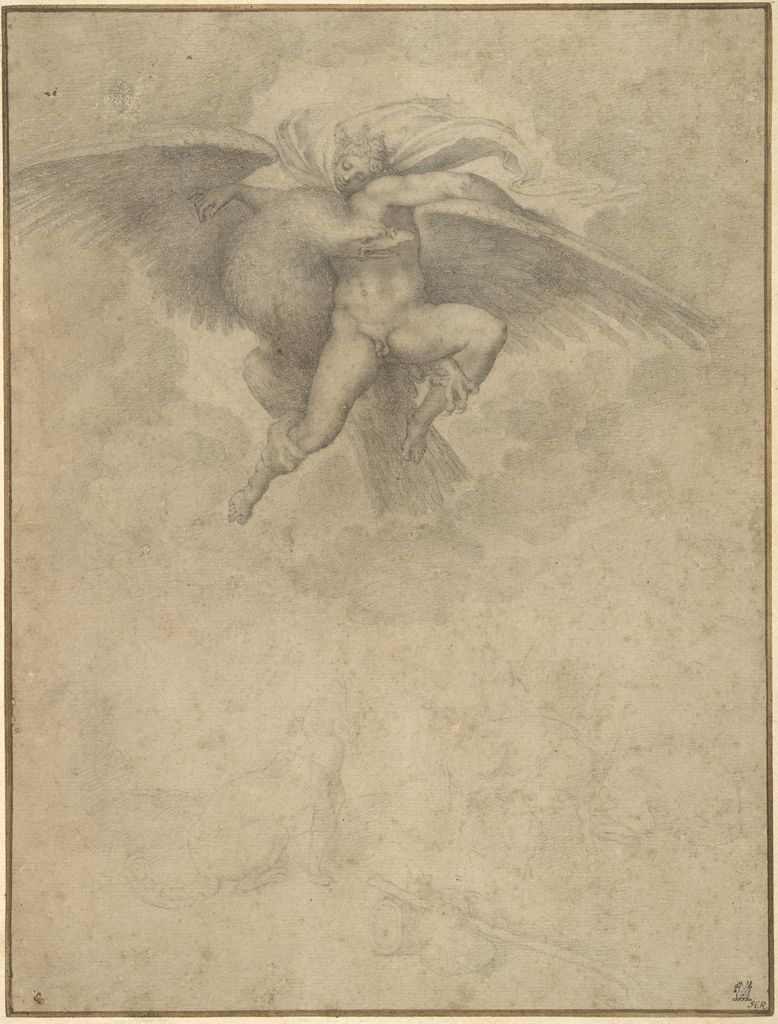
Copy derived from Michelangelo's lost Rape of Ganymede, c. 1532

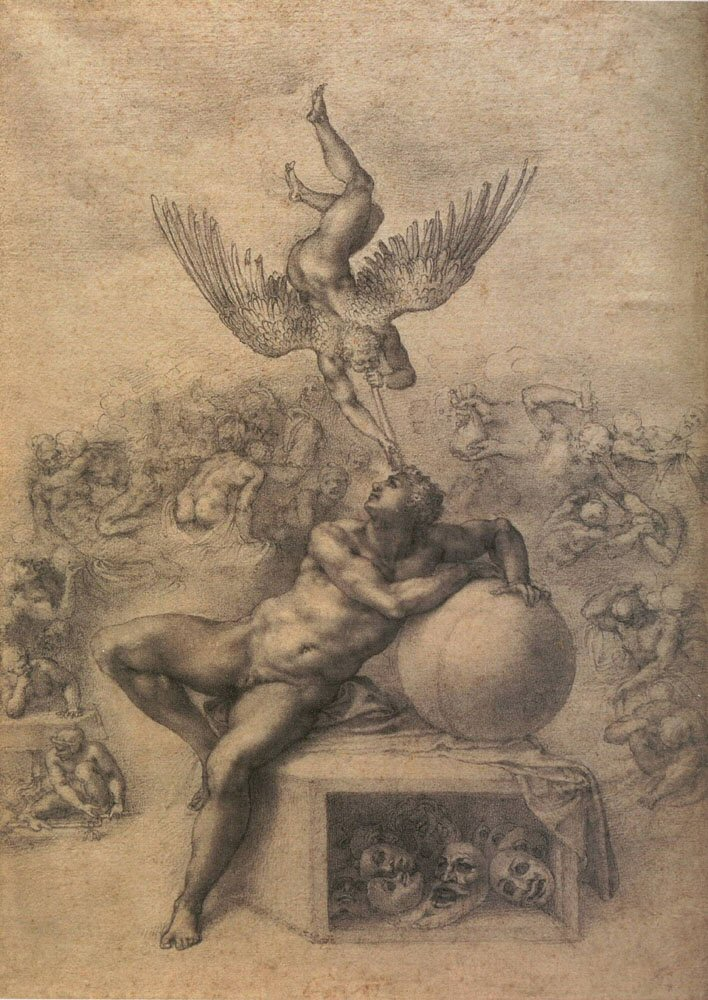
Michelangelo, The Dream, c. 1533

The two drawings at left both represent a muscular male attacked by an eagle. Tityus was the son of a human princess and the god Zeus. He attempted to rape a goddess and was killed by two of the deities, but his punishment did not end with death; for eternity, he was chained to a rock in Hades while two vultures ate his liver, which was considered the seat of the passions.

Zeus lusted after Ganymede, the most beautiful of all humans, and turned himself into an eagle to abduct him to serve the god at Mount Olympus, or to rape him. The original drawing by Michelangelo of the rape of Ganymede, the first image presented here, is lost and is known today only from copies.

One drawing represents the myth of Phaeton, a son of Apollo who nagged his father into letting him drive the chariot of the sun that his father drove daily. Phaeton lost control of the fiery horses, and to keep the runaway chariot from destroying the earth, Zeus had to destroy the chariot with a thunderbolt, thereby killing Phaeton. Zeus is riding an eagle as he casts the thunderbolt that overturns the chariot. The three women depicted below the falling chariot represent Phaeton's grieving sisters.

Three versions of this drawing by Michelangelo survive; this is perhaps the final version that was given to Cavalieri by September 6, 1533, the date of a letter to the artist telling him the drawing had been much admired by illustrious visitors (including the Pope and Cardinal Ippolito de' Medici).

On another version of the composition, today in the British Museum, Michelangelo wrote a note to Cavalieri: "Master Tommaso, if this sketch does not please you, tell Urbino so that I have time to do another by tomorrow evening, as I promised you. And if you like it and want me to finish it, send it back to me."

The Dream (at right) is a drawing that is not directly linked to Cavalieri, but its resemblance to those drawings has suggested to some scholars that it was related to them. Unlike some of the other drawings, the iconography does not derive from Greek mythology, and its uncertain subject is interpreted as linked with beauty.

=== Poems ===
Michelangelo dedicated approximately 30 of his total 300 poems to Cavalieri, which made them the artist's largest sequence of poems. Most were sonnets, although there were also madrigals and quatrains. The central theme of all of them was the artist's love for the young nobleman. Some modern commentators assert that the relationship was merely a platonic affection, even suggesting that Michelangelo was seeking a surrogate son. (Note: One source goes so far as to claim, "These have naturally been interpreted as indications that Michelangelo was a homosexual, but such a reaction according to the artist's own statement would be that of the ignorant".) Contemporaries of Michelangelo's grand-nephew, Michelangelo the Younger, suggested a homoerotic nature of the poems that prompted him to publish an edition of the poetry in 1623 with the gender of pronouns changed. In 1893, an early British homosexual activist, John Addington Symonds, wrote a two-volume biography of the artist, and he undid this change in his translation into English of the original sonnets.

The sonnets by Michelangelo are the first large sequence of poems in any modern tongue known to be addressed by one man to another, predating Shakespeare's sonnets to his young friend by a good 50 years. Examples include the sonnet G.260. Michelangelo reiterates his Neoplatonic love for Cavalieri in the first line of the sonnet, where he states, "Love is not always a harsh and deadly sin".

In the sonnet G.41 Michelangelo states that Cavalieri is all that can be, and represents pity, love, and piety. This is seen in the third stanza:

l'amor mi prende e la beltà mi lega;
la pietà, la mercè con dolci sguardi
ferma speranz' al cor par che ne doni.

Love takes me captive; beauty binds my soul;
Pity and mercy with their gentle eyes
Wake in my heart a hope that cannot cheat

One of the most famous of Michelangelo's poems is G.94, which is also called the "Silkworm". In the sonnet, Michelangelo expresses a desire to be garments that clothe the body of Cavalieri.
