= Tityos (Ribera) =

Painting by Jusepe de Ribera

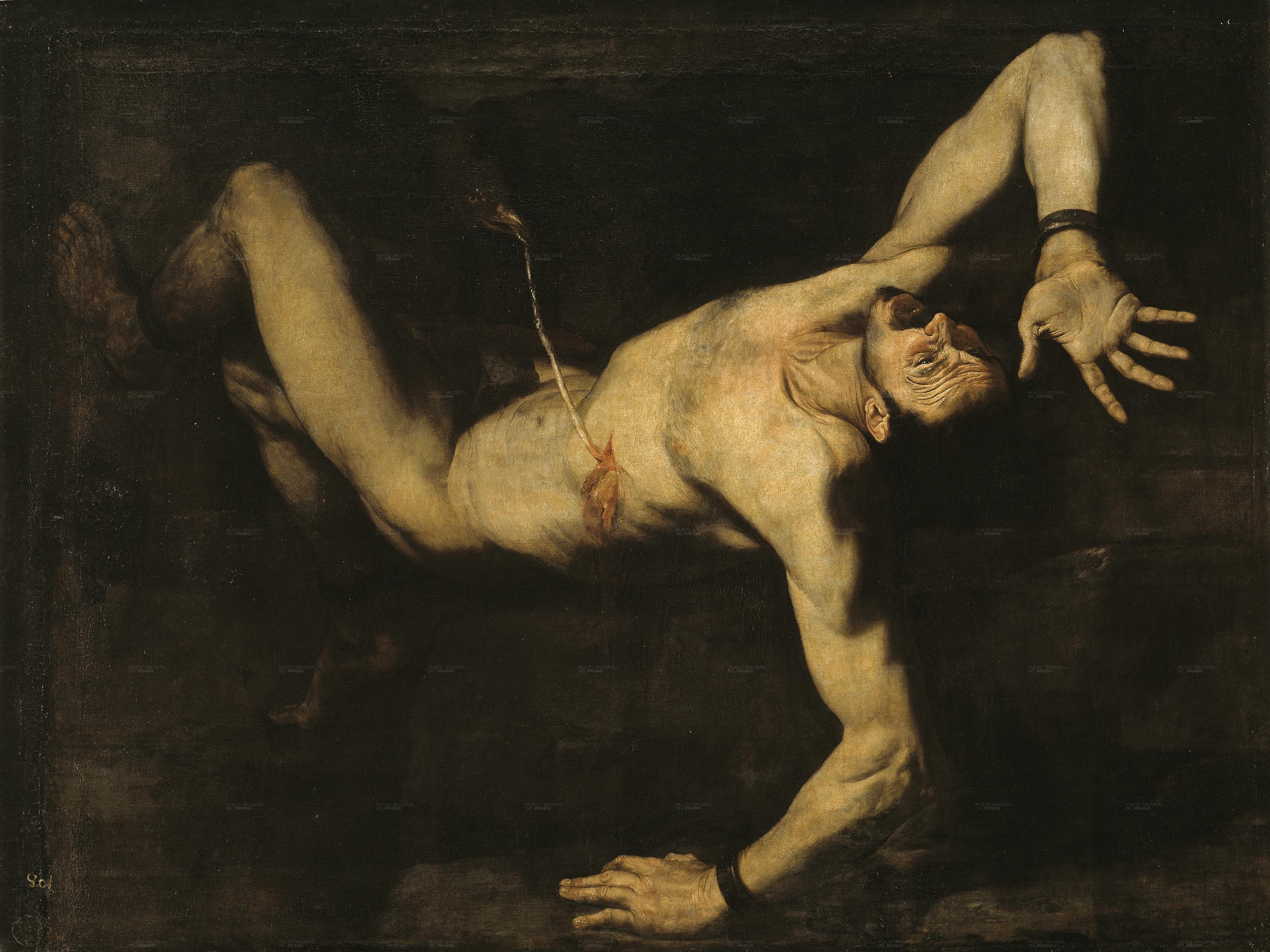
Tityos (1632) by Jusepe de Ribera

Tityos is a 1632 painting, signed and dated by Jusepe de Ribera and showing the torture inflicted on the giant Tityos. It was part of a series of four paintings - the other three showed the tortures of Sisyphus, Tantalus and Ixion, but only those of Tityos and Ixion still survive, both now in the Prado Museum in Madrid.

It is unknown who commissioned the series, though its large format and theme of torture inflicted on rebels against just authority suggests a royal commission. The set of four was bought in 1634 from the Marquise de Charela by Jerónimo de Villanueva, Pronotario de Aragón, for the Buen Retiro Palace. They remained there until the 18th century.

== Sources ==
- https://www.museodelprado.es/coleccion/galeria-on-line/galeria-on-line/obra/ticio-1//?no_cache=1
