= Tityos =

Greek mythological giant

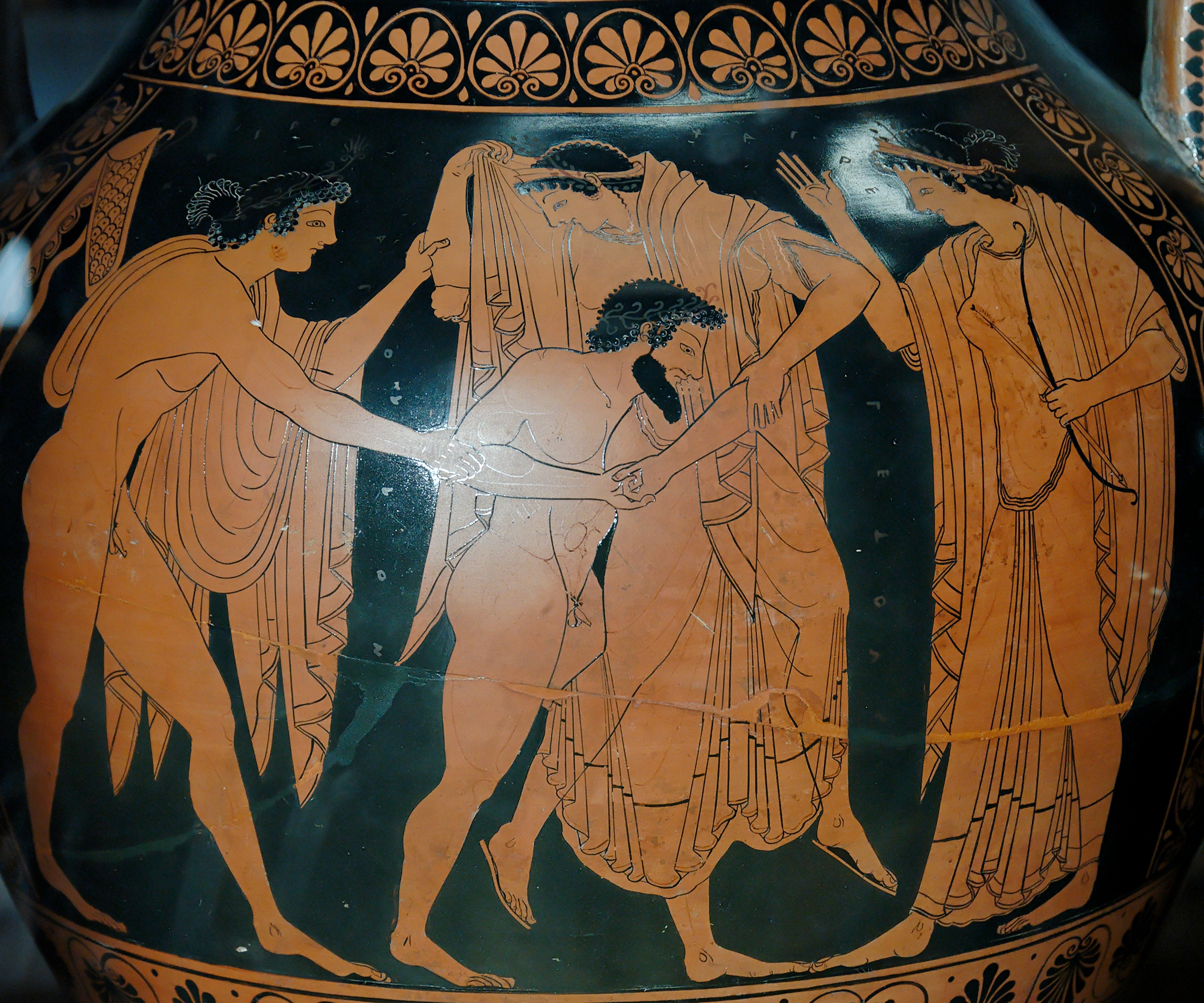
Tityos attempts to rape Leto and is stopped by Apollo and Artemis on an Attic red-figure amphora from Vulci, c. 510–520 BCE, by the Phintias Painter. Louvre, Paris.

Tityos or Tityus (Ancient Greek: Τιτυός, romanized: Tituós) is a giant from Greek mythology. The son of Zeus and the mortal Elara, Tityos tried to rape the goddess Leto, a former lover of Zeus and the mother of the twin gods Artemis and Apollo. The twins rescued their mother and punished Tityos with eternal torture in the Underworld.

== Family ==
Tityos was the son of the mortal princess Elara and the god Zeus. He had a daughter named Europa who coupled with Poseidon and gave birth to Euphemus, one of the Argonauts.

Tityos' family tree

Elara	Zeus
Tityos
Europa	Poseidon
Euphemus

== Mythology ==
Zeus slept with Elara, but afterwards he hid her from his wife, Hera, by placing her deep beneath the earth, afraid of Hera's reaction. Tityos grew so large that he split his mother's womb, and he was carried to term by Gaia, the Earth. Once grown, Tityos attempted to rape Leto at the behest of Hera. He was slain by Leto's protective children Artemis and Apollo. In some accounts, Tityus was instead slain by the thunderbolt of his father Zeus. As punishment, he was stretched out in Tartarus and tortured by two vultures who fed on his liver, which grew back every night. This punishment is comparable to that of the Titan Prometheus.

Jane Ellen Harrison noted that "to the orthodox worshiper of the Olympians he was the vilest of criminals; as such Homer knew him":

I saw Tityus too,
son of the mighty Goddess Earth—sprawling there
on the ground, spread over nine acres—two vultures
hunched on either side of him, digging into his liver,
beaking deep in the blood-sac, and he with his frantic hands
could never beat them off, for he had once dragged off
the famous consort of Zeus in all her glory,
Leto, threading her way toward Pytho's ridge
over the lovely dancing-rings of Panopeus".

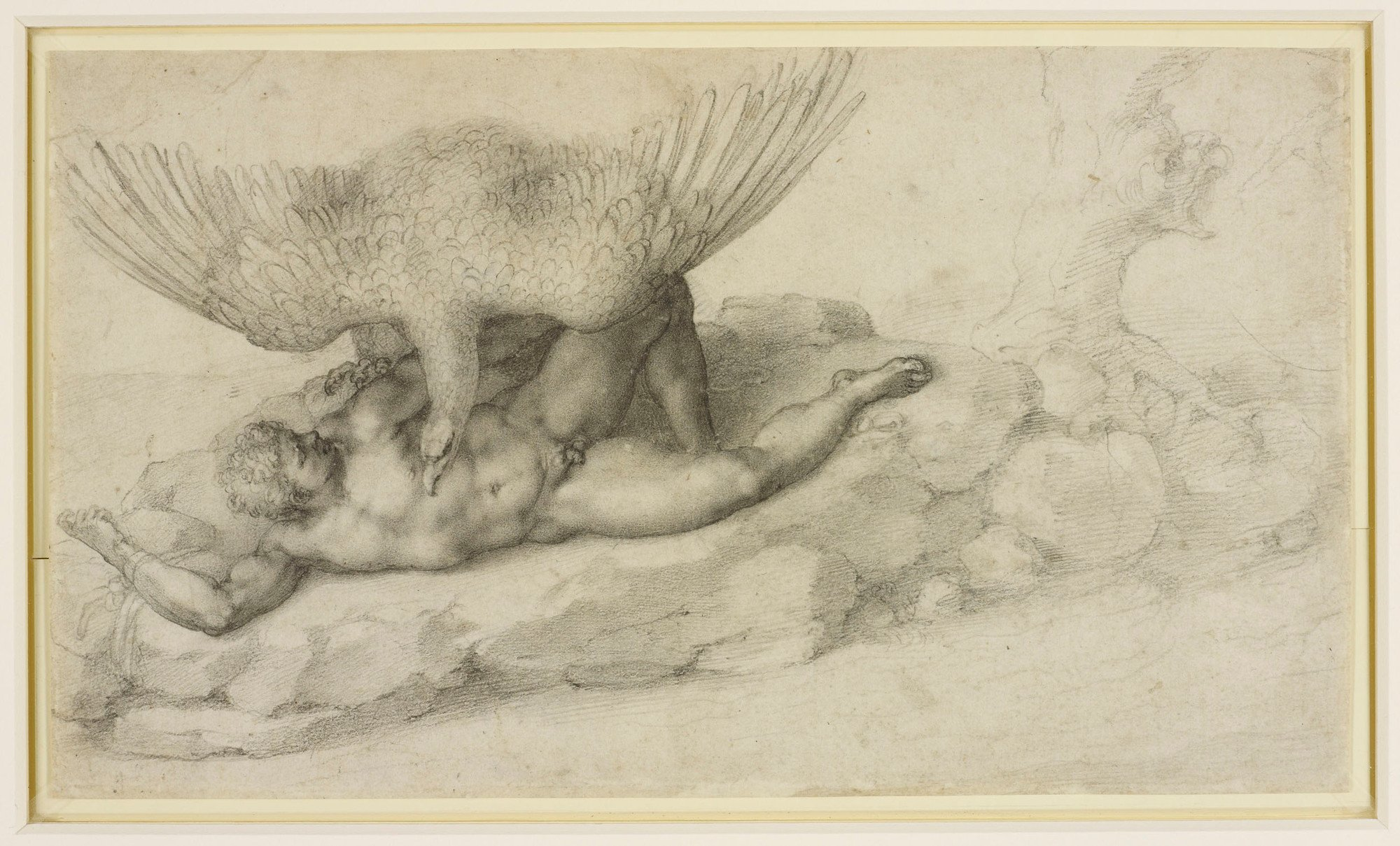
Michelangelo, The Punishment of Tityus, c. 1532

In the early first century, when the geographer Strabo visited Panopeus, he was reminded by the local people that it was the abode of Tityos and recalled the fact that the Phaeacians had carried Rhadamanthus in their boats to visit Tityos, according to Homer. There on Euboea at the time of Strabo they were still showing a "cave called Elarion from Elara who was mother to Tityos, and a hero-shrine of Tityos, and some kind of honours are mentioned which are paid him." It is clear that the local hero-cult had been superseded by the cult of the Olympian gods, an Olympian father provided, and the hero demonized. A comparable giant chthonic pre-Olympian of a Titan-like order is Orion.

The poet Lucretius, in De rerum natura (Book III, lines 978–998), provides a demythologized Tityos who is "the prototypical anguished lover," eternally punished not in the underworld, but here and now, by a plague not of vultures but of cupids.

Virgil briefly depicts Tityos' torments in Book VI of his Aeneid. Hamilton (1993) suggests that Virgil's description of Tityos' agony and unrest contains a "verbal echo" of the lovesick Dido's unrest in Book IV, indicating that Virgil's Tityos, while "remythologized," remains indebted to Lucretius's.

Virgil is the first to depict Tityos tormented by a single vulture instead of Homer's two, "perhaps due to contamination with the story of Prometheus." Among Roman writers, Horace and Claudian follow Virgil in depicting a singular vulture; Ovid and Seneca vary from work to work; Propertius and Statius depict more than one vulture.

The traveler Pausanias (2nd century A.D.) reports seeing a painting by Polygnotus at Delphi that depicts Tityos among other figures being tormented in Hades for sacrilege: "Tityos too is in the picture; he is no longer being punished, but has been reduced to nothing by continuous torture, an indistinct and mutilated phantom."

== Postclassical references ==
Tityos is mentioned in Dante Alighieri's Inferno as among the biblical and mythological giants frozen onto the rings outside of Hell's Circle of Treachery. Dante and Virgil threaten to go to Tityos and Typhon if Antaeus doesn't lower them into the Circle of Treachery.

Jusepe de Ribera's painting Tityos (1632) depicts a vulture feeding on the left side of Tityos' body (despite that the human liver is located on the right side of the body).

== General and cited references ==
- Brill's New Pauly: Encyclopaedia of the Ancient World. Antiquity, Volume 14, Sym–Tub, editors: Hubert Cancik, Helmuth Schneider, Brill, 2009. ISBN 978-90-04-14219-0. Online version at Brill.
- Harrison, Jane Ellen. Prolegomena to the Study of Greek Religion. (1903), 1922, p. 336f.
- Hard, Robin, The Routledge Handbook of Greek Mythology: Based on H. J. Rose's "Handbook of Greek Mythology", Psychology Press, 2004. ISBN 978-0-415-18636-0. Google Books.
- Homer, The Odyssey with an English Translation by A. T. Murray, Ph.D. in two volumes. Cambridge, MA., Harvard University Press; London, William Heinemann, Ltd. 1919. ISBN 978-0674995611. Online version at the Perseus Digital Library. Greek text available from the same website.
- Hyginus, Fabulae from The Myths of Hyginus translated and edited by Mary Grant. University of Kansas Publications in Humanistic Studies. Online version at the Topos Text Project.
- Pausanias, Description of Greece with an English Translation by W. H. S. Jones, Litt.D., and H. A. Ormerod, M.A., in 4 Volumes. Cambridge, MA, Harvard University Press; London, William Heinemann Ltd. 1918. ISBN 0-674-99328-4. Online version at the Perseus Digital Library.
- Pausanias, Graeciae Descriptio. 3 vols. Leipzig, Teubner. 1903. Greek text available at the Perseus Digital Library.
- Smith, William. Dictionary of Greek and Roman Biography and Mythology, London (1873). "Ti'tyus" .
