= Johannes Popels =

Painter of the Southern Netherlands

- Born: 1590
- Died: 1663 (aged 72–73); Tournai

Jan or Johannes Popels (1590 – 1663) was a painter of the Southern Netherlands.

Popels became a member of the Antwerp Guild of Saint Luke from 1622 until 1663. He engraved religious subjects, and Vienna's Albertina has his Group of Three Naked Children. He worked for the catalog of Italian painters in the gallery of the Archduke Leopold Wilhelm of Austria, making copies of paintings and modelli in collaboration with David Teniers the Younger.

He died in Tournai.

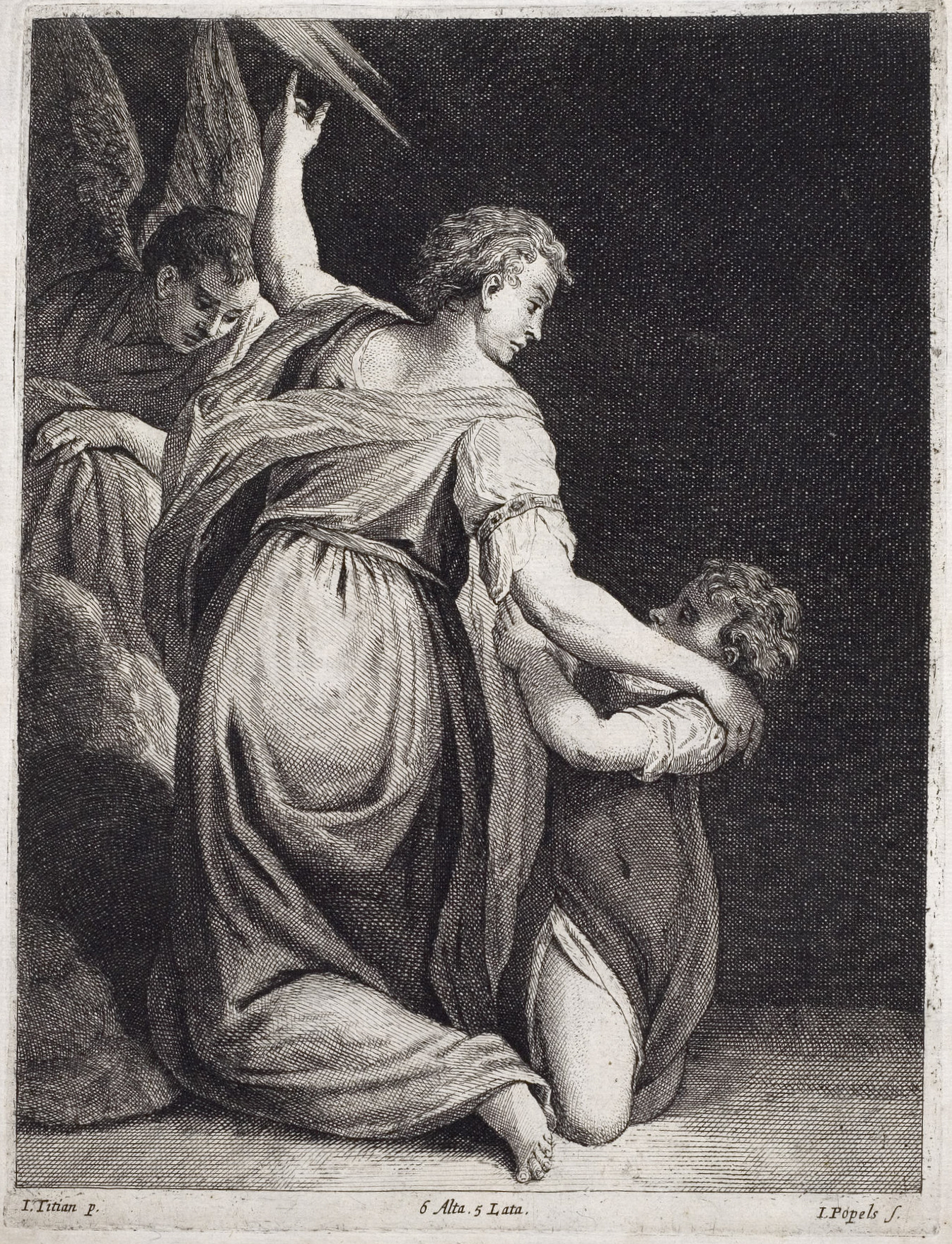
After Titian for the Theatrum Pictorium

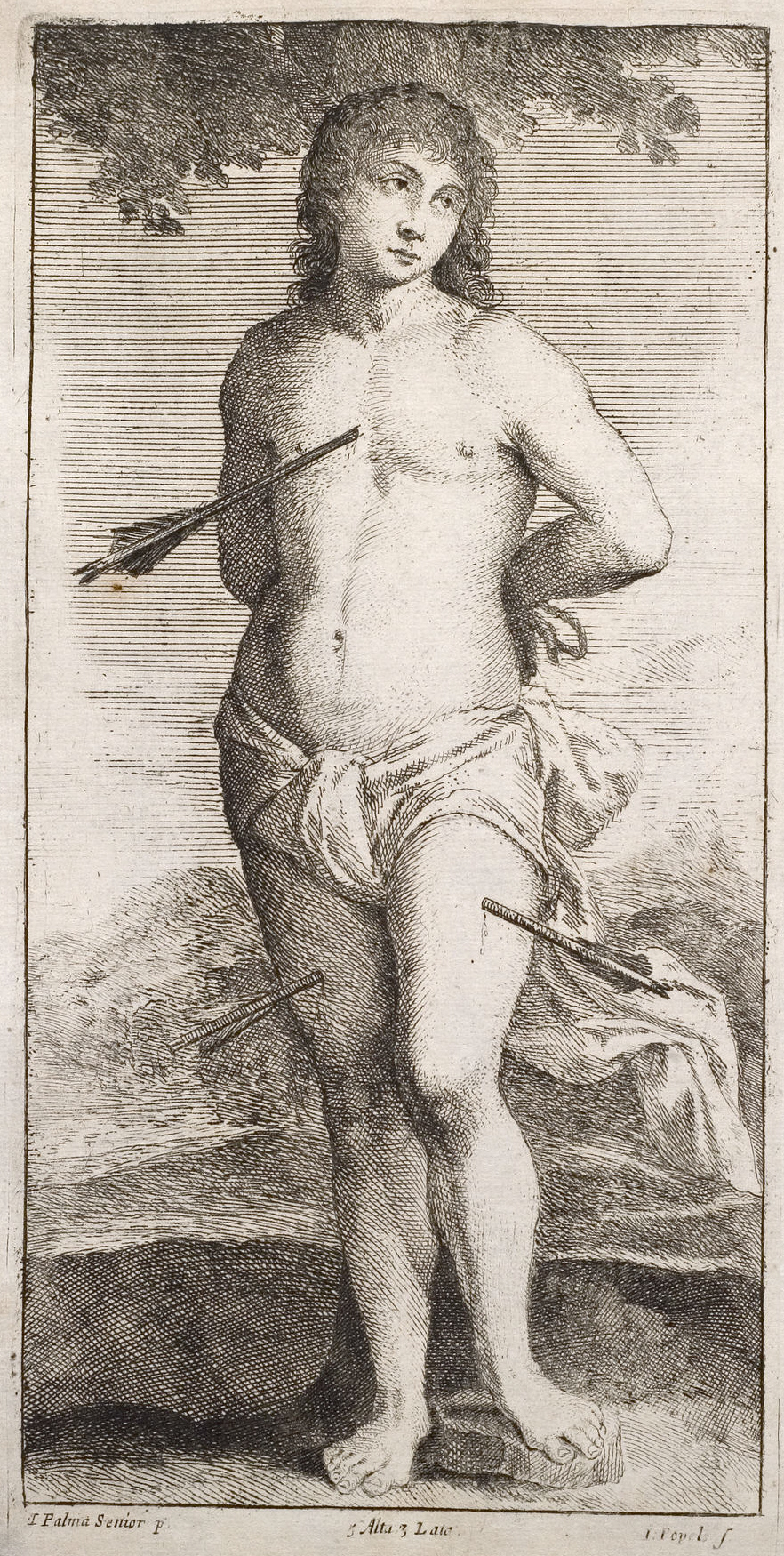
After Palma Vecchio for the Theatrum Pictorium
