= Francesco Lupicini =

Italian painter

Francisco Lupicini
- Born: 1590; Florence
- Died: 1656 (aged 65–66); Zaragoza

Francesco Lupicini (1590 – 1656) was an Italian painter active in Zaragoza.

Lupicini was born in Florence and was a cousin or brother of Gian Battista Lupicini, who has often been listed as the painter of his works. His painting of Mary Magdalene being admonished by her sister Martha has been in the collection of the Kunsthistorisches Museum since it was purchased by Archduke Leopold Wilhelm, who had it engraved for his Theatrum Pictorium.

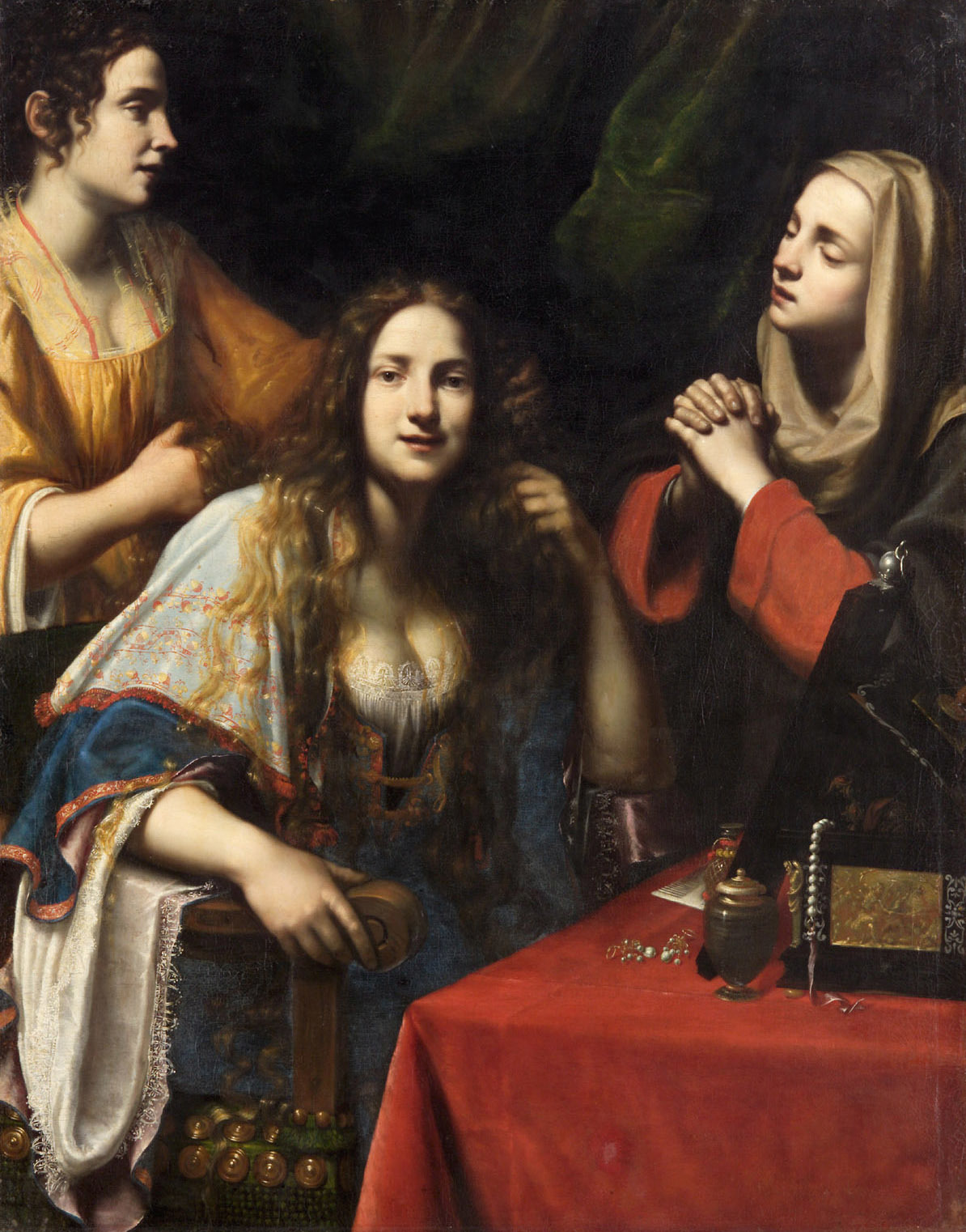

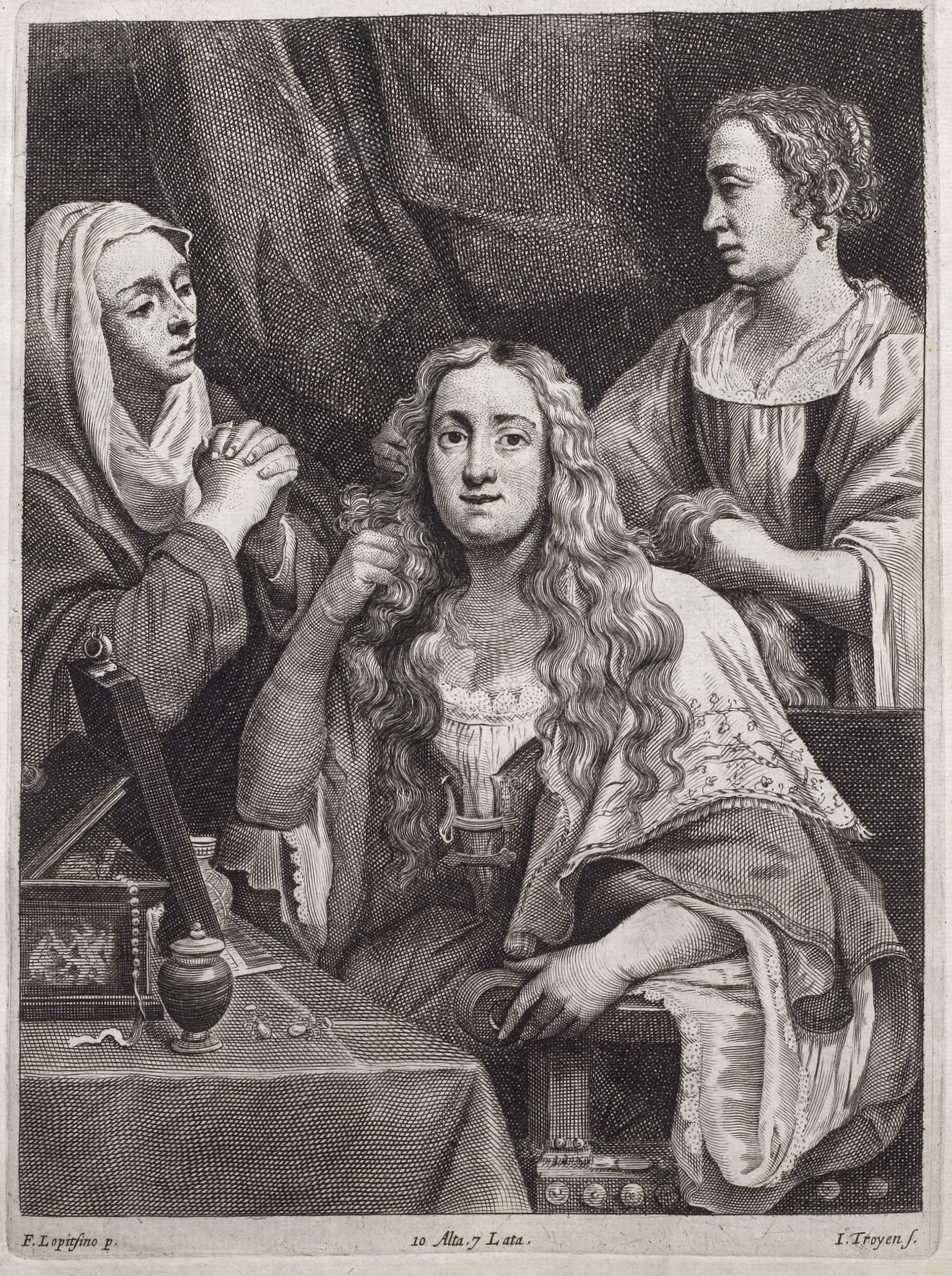

Lupicini died in Zaragoza.
