= Remoldus Eynhoudt =

- Born: 1 October 1613; Antwerp
- Died: 1680 (aged 66–67); Antwerp

Remoldus Eynhoudt and Remoldus Eynhouedt (1613 – 1680) was a Flemish printmaker who is mainly known for his reproductions after works by Antwerp masters.

== Life ==
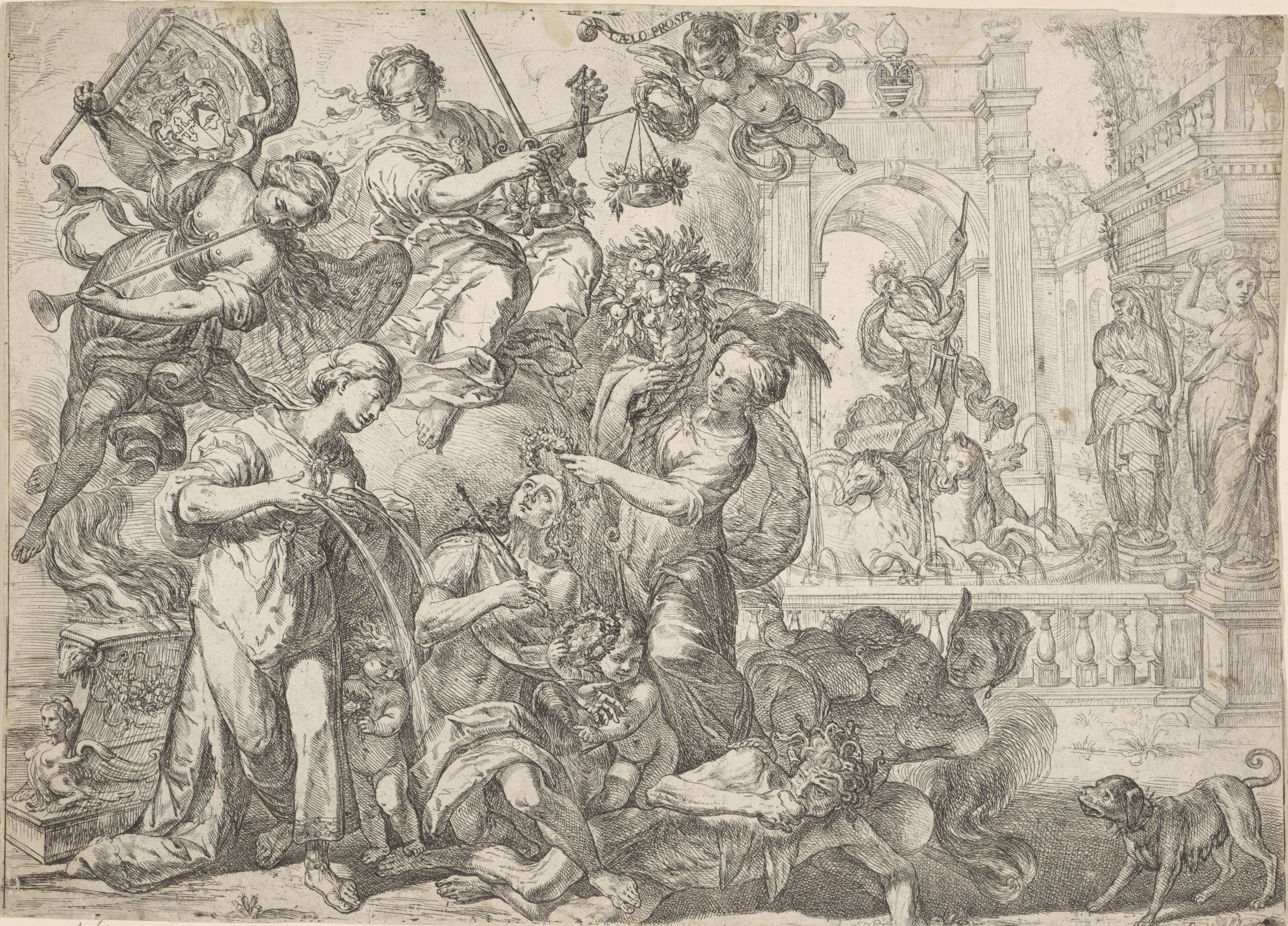
Allegory of Peace, after Rubens

Eynhoudt was born in Antwerp and became a pupil of the painter Adam van Noort, who was also the master of Rubens and Jacob Jordaens. He became a master in the Antwerp Guild of Saint Luke in 1636.

There are a number of spelling variants of his first name including Remoldus, Romuldus and Rombout and of his last name Eynhoudts, Eynhouedts, Eynhouedt, Eynhouts and Eÿnhouedts.

Eynhoudt died in Antwerp.

== Work ==
He is known for engravings after old masters, most notably for David Teniers the Younger's Theatrum Pictorium, but also for engravings after Rubens, Cornelis Schut, and Jacob Jordaens. A number of prints executed in 1652 formerly attributed to Jordaens, have now been tentatively attributed to him.

His style is characterised by his rigid handling of the etching needle and the stiff depictions of drapery. The outlines of the figures appear unsteady. His crosshatching is irregular and rather crude. He uses a schematic way to etch faces the hands of figures are often too small and with pointy fingers.
