= Theatrum Pictorium =

Paintings catalog by David Teniers the Younger

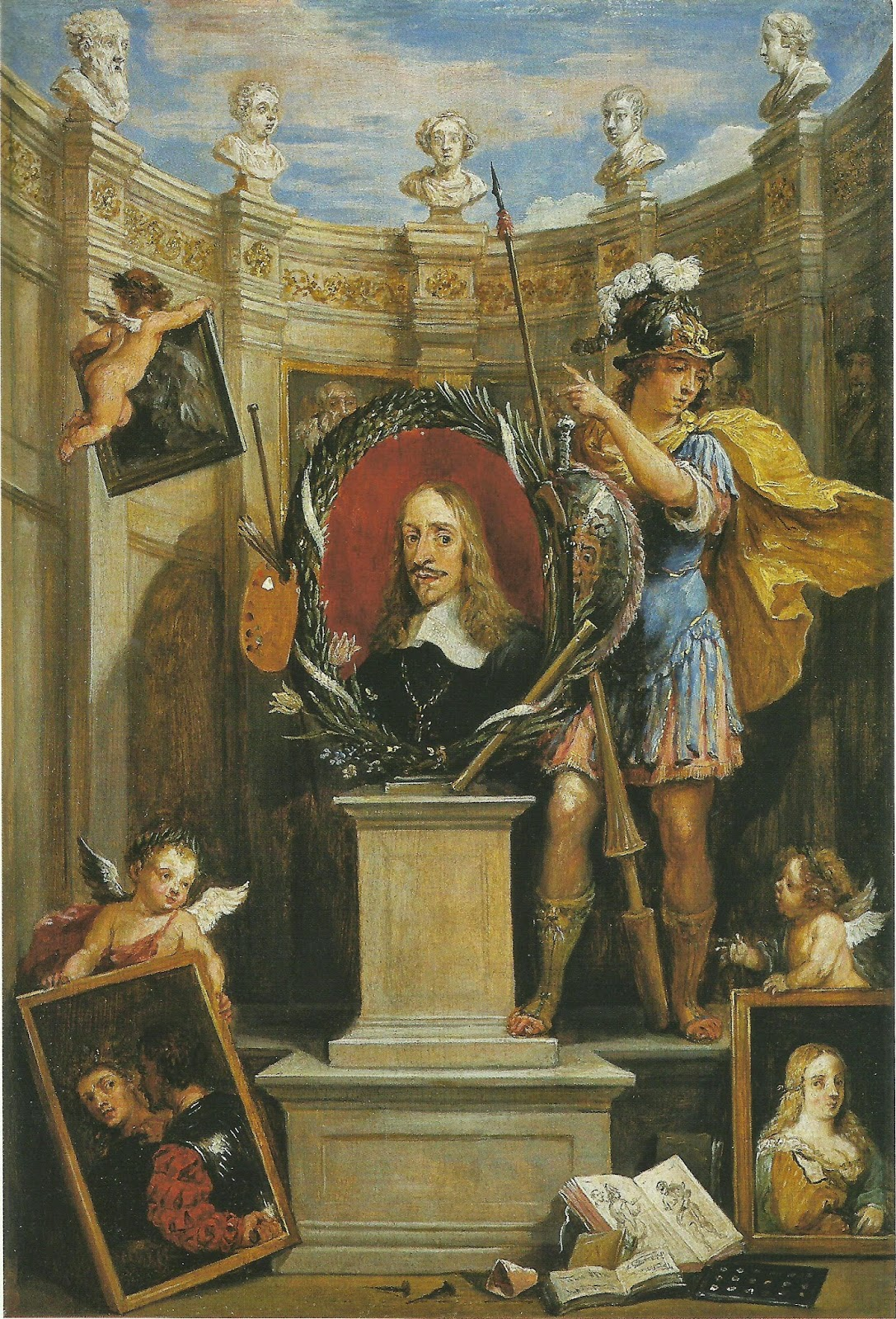
Modello for the frontispiece for the Theatrum Pictorium, by Teniers

Theatrum Pictorium, or Theatre of Painting, is a short-hand name of a book published in 1660 in Brussels by David Teniers the Younger for his employer, the Archduke Leopold Wilhelm of Austria. It catalogs 243 Italian paintings in the Archduke's collection of over 1300 paintings. The paintings are reproduced by engravings made by various engravers after reduced-size copies (modelli) created by Teniers. David Teniers' brother Abraham Teniers was involved in organizing the publication of the work. A second edition with page numbers was published in 1673.

== Background ==
During the years 1646-1656 when he was stationed in Brussels as governor of the Habsburg Netherlands, Archduke Leopold Wilhelm assembled one of the greatest art collections of his age. Teniers effectively became its curator after Jan van den Hoecke, a court painter and curator of the collection in Brussels died in 1651. The collection included works by Hans Holbein the Elder, Pieter Bruegel the Elder, Jan van Eyck, Raphael, Giorgione, Paolo Veronese and more than 15 works by Titian.

Before moving back to Vienna in 1656, Archduke Leopold Wilhelm kept his art collection in his palace in Brussels. Teniers depicted the galleries in which the collection was displayed in various compositions which are now spread across various collections.

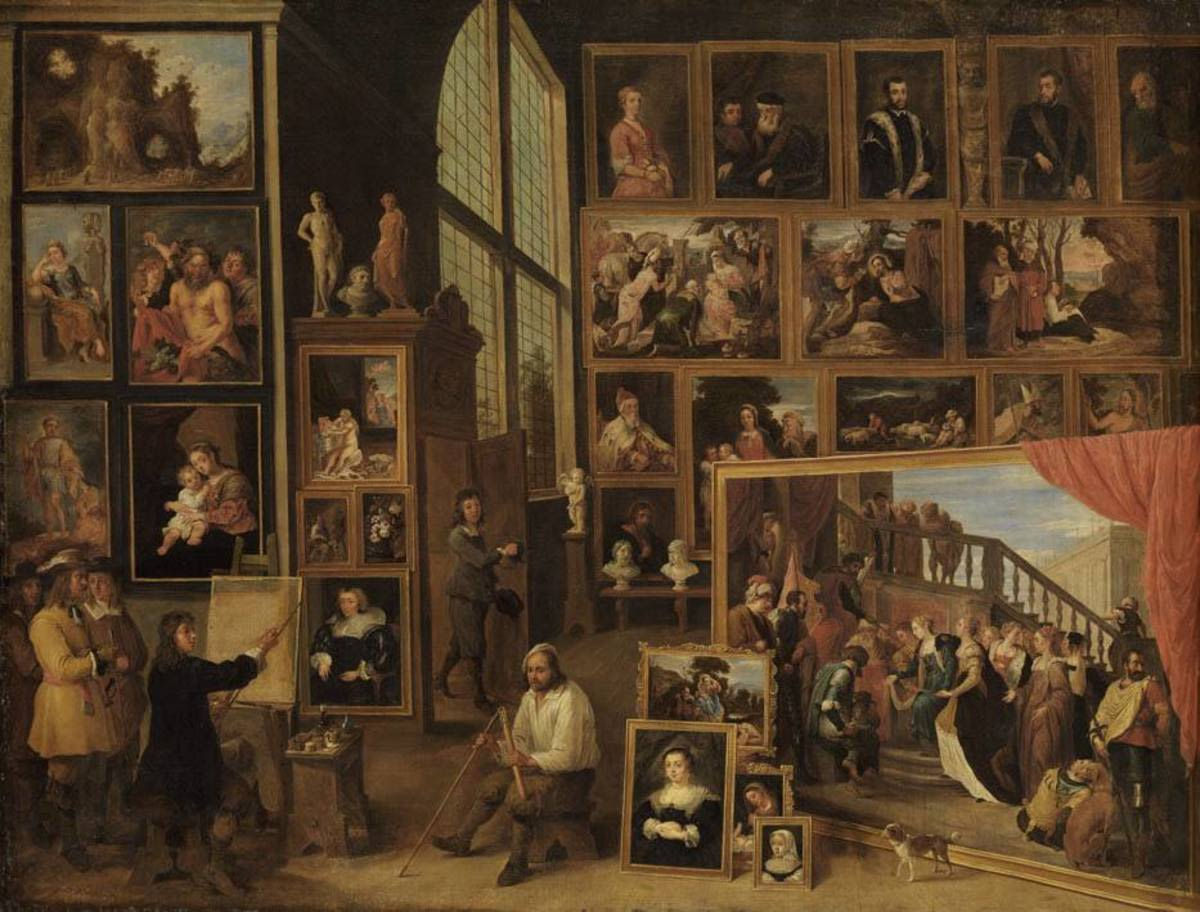
Gallery of Archduke Leopold Wilhelm in Brussels (I)

At the end of his governorship in 1656, the Archduke and his collection relocated to the Stallburg. This archducal collection now forms the heart of Vienna's Kunsthistorisches Museum.

== Scope of the project ==
During his tenure as keeper of Archduke Leopold Wilhelm's collection, Teniers undertook the preparation and publication of the first ever illustrated catalog of old master paintings. His brother Abraham Teniers was involved in organizing the publication of the work. The first official publication of the work in bound book format was published by Hendrick Aertssens in Brussels in 1660 (although the frontispiece page states the date as 1658). The frontispiece of the Theatrum pictorium shows a bust portrait of the Archduke with a dedication to the Archduke.

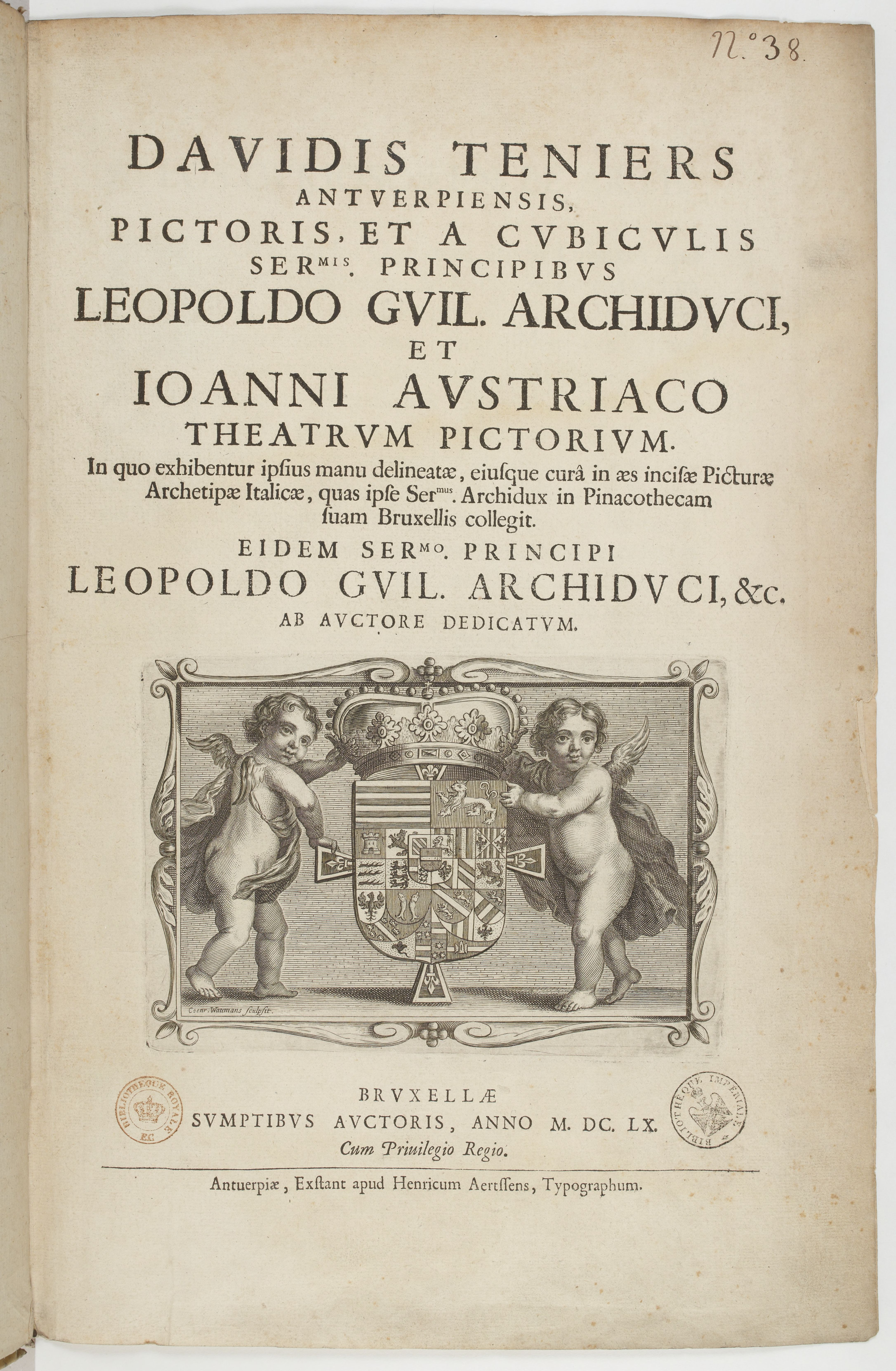
1660 title page for Theatrum pictorium engraved by Coenraet Waumans

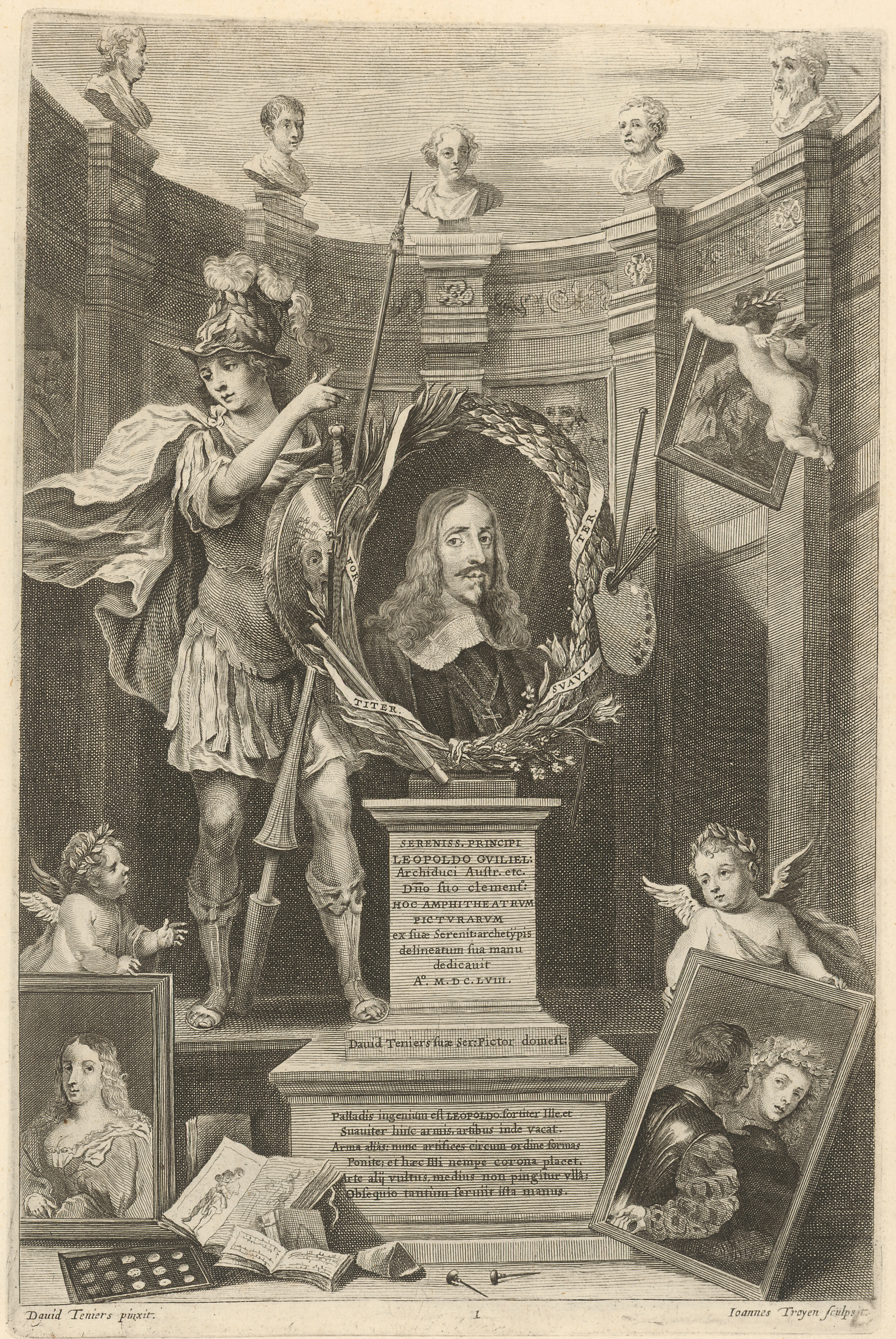
1660 frontispiece engraved by Jan van Troyen after Teniers for Hoc Amphiteatrum Picturarum after Teniers

Though the frontispiece of the book designed by Teniers refers to it as 'Hoc Amphiteatrum Picturarum' ('This amphitheatre of pictures'),,the publication is now often referred to in the short form used on the title page as Theatrum pictorium ('Theatre of Paintings'). The publication includes four pages of introduction in Latin, French, Spanish and Dutch.

Spanish introduction from a copy in the collection of the French National Library:

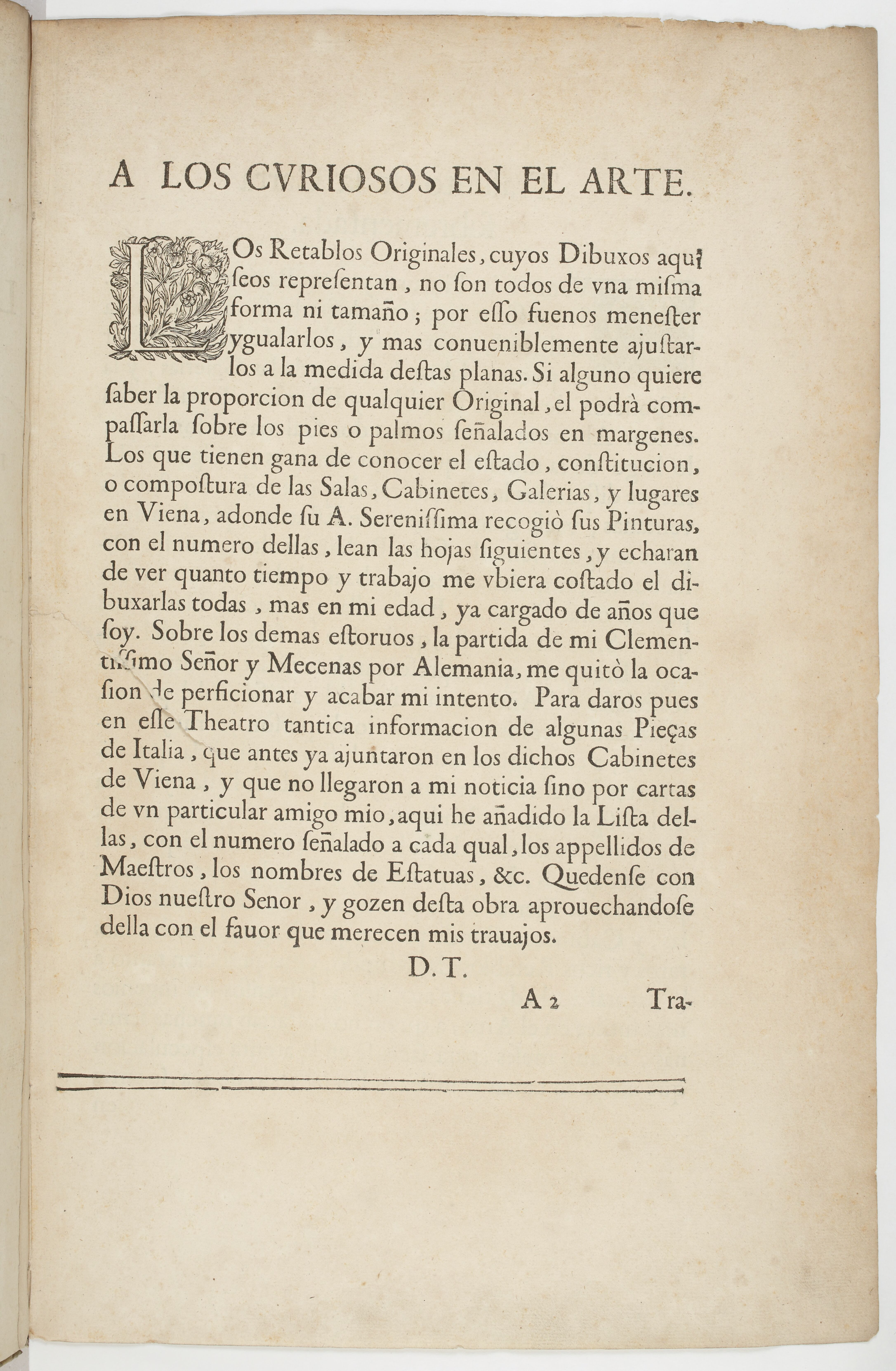

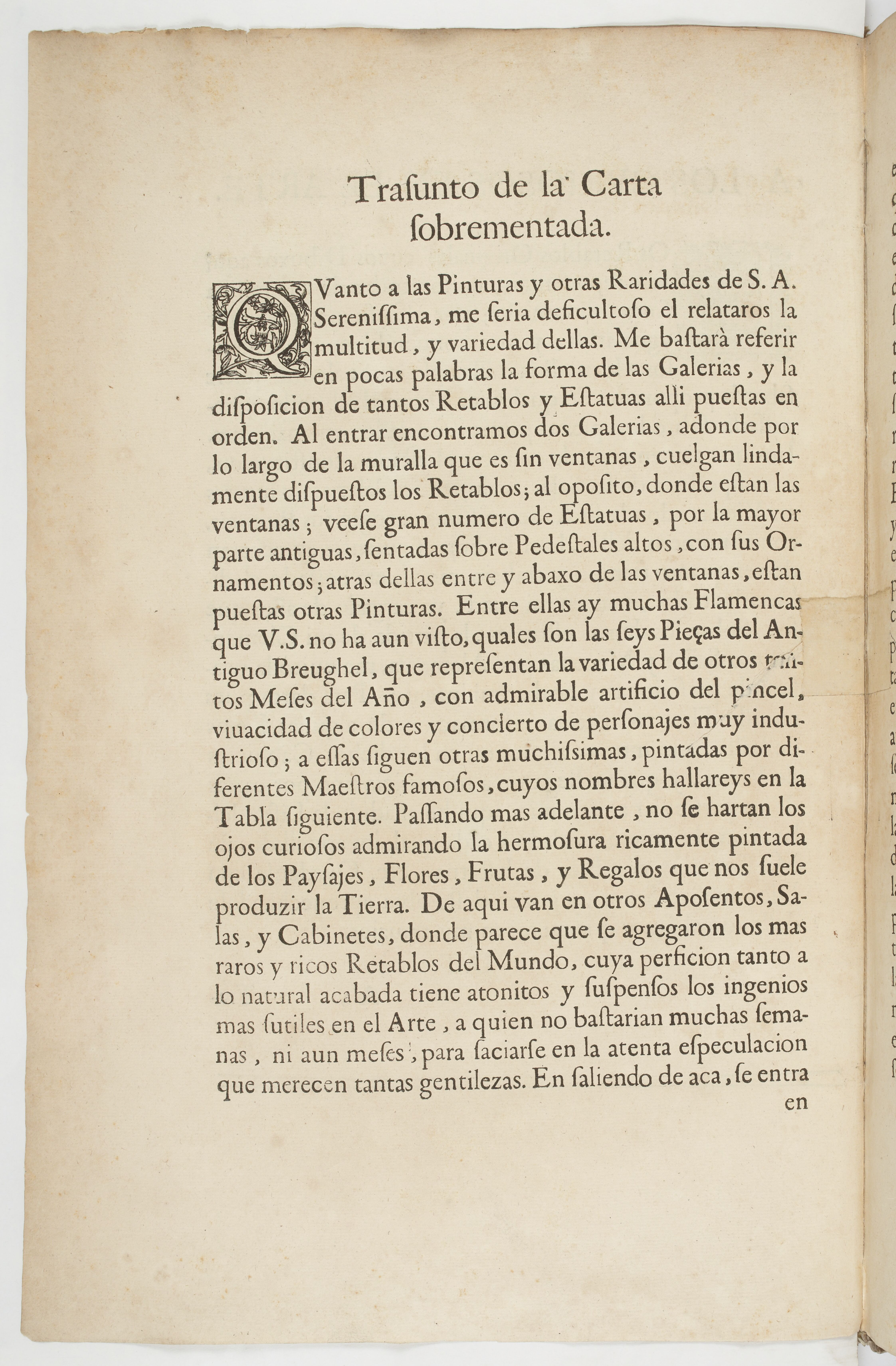

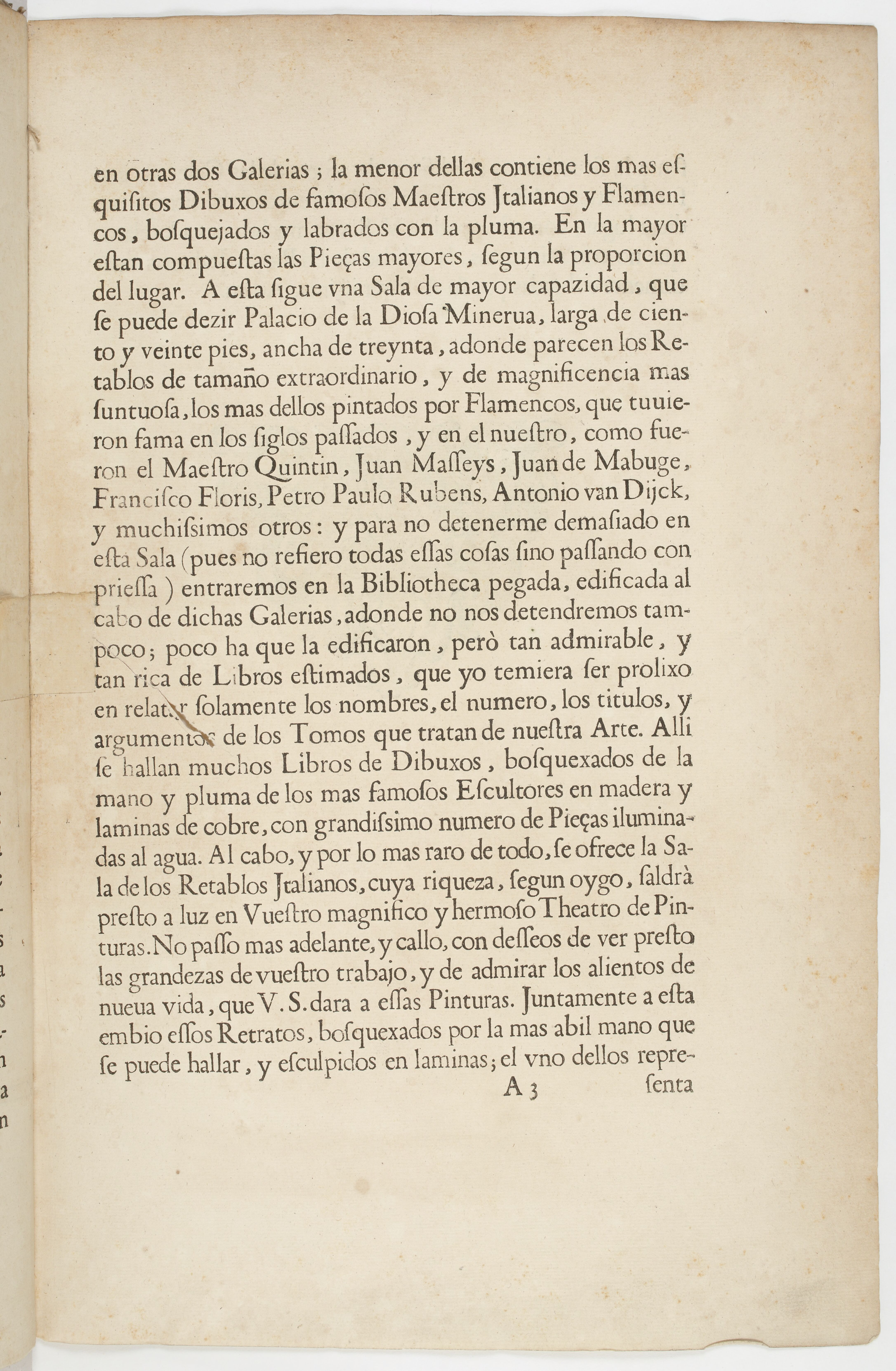

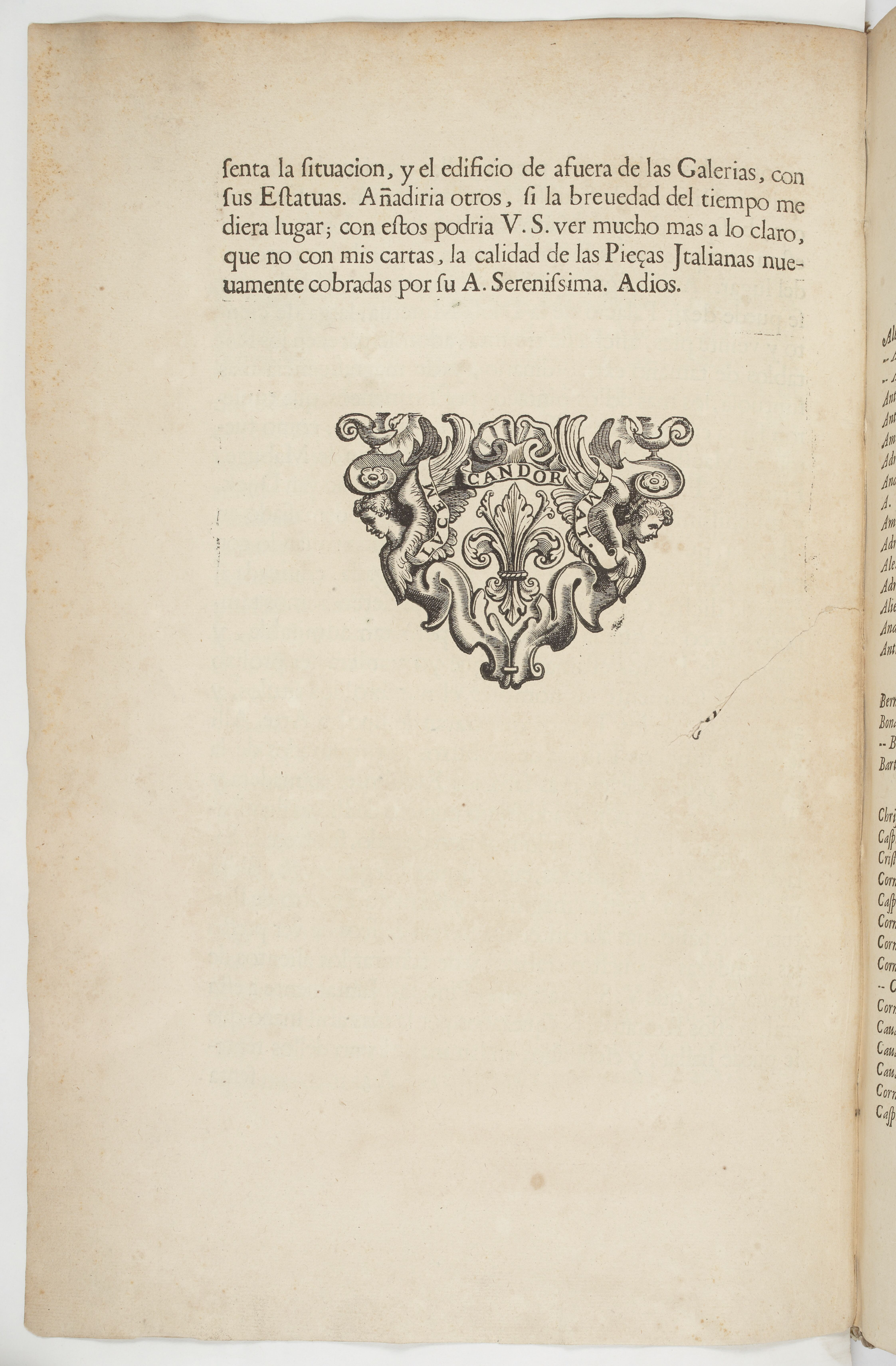

Dutch introduction from a copy in the collection of the Getty Research Institute:

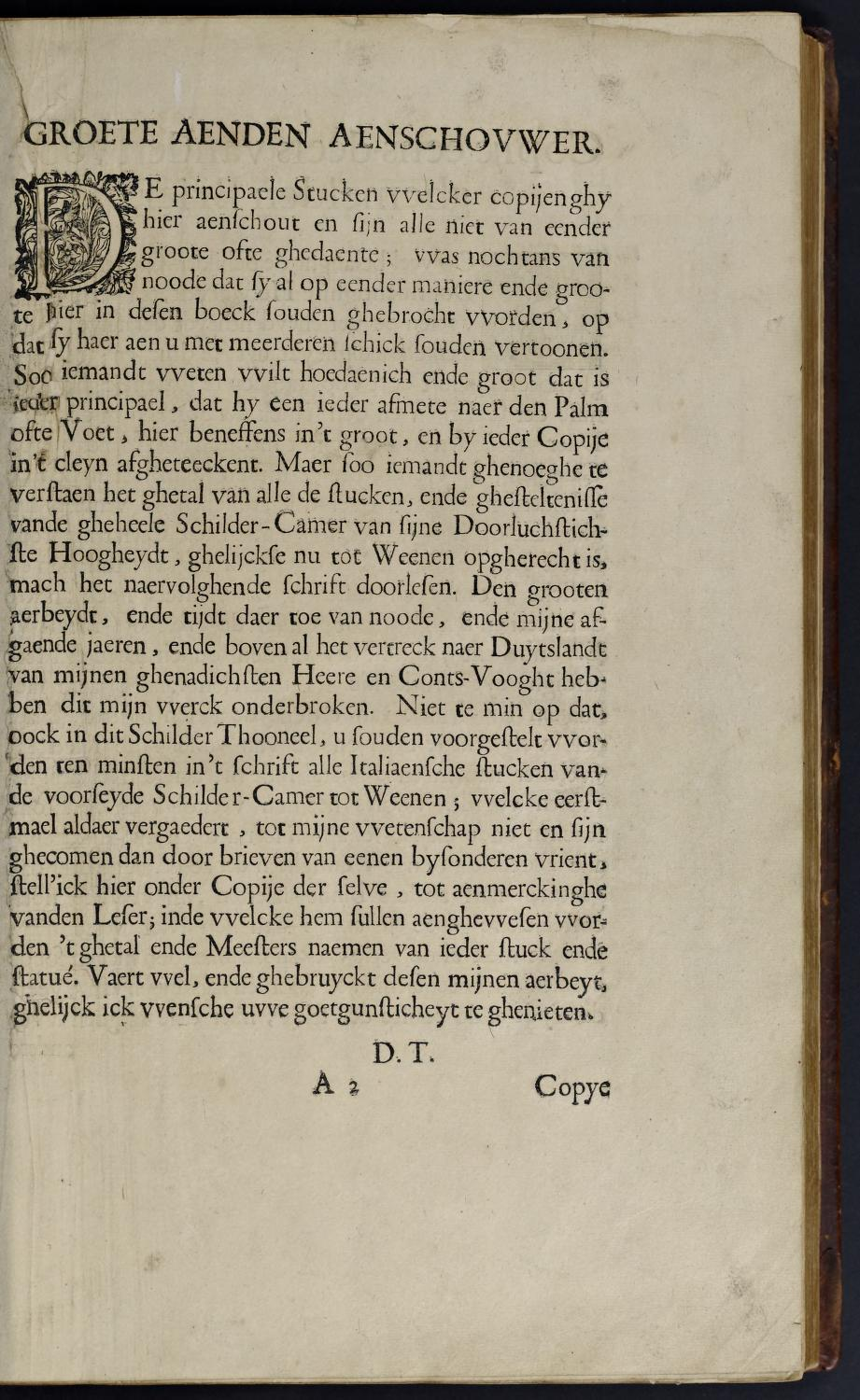

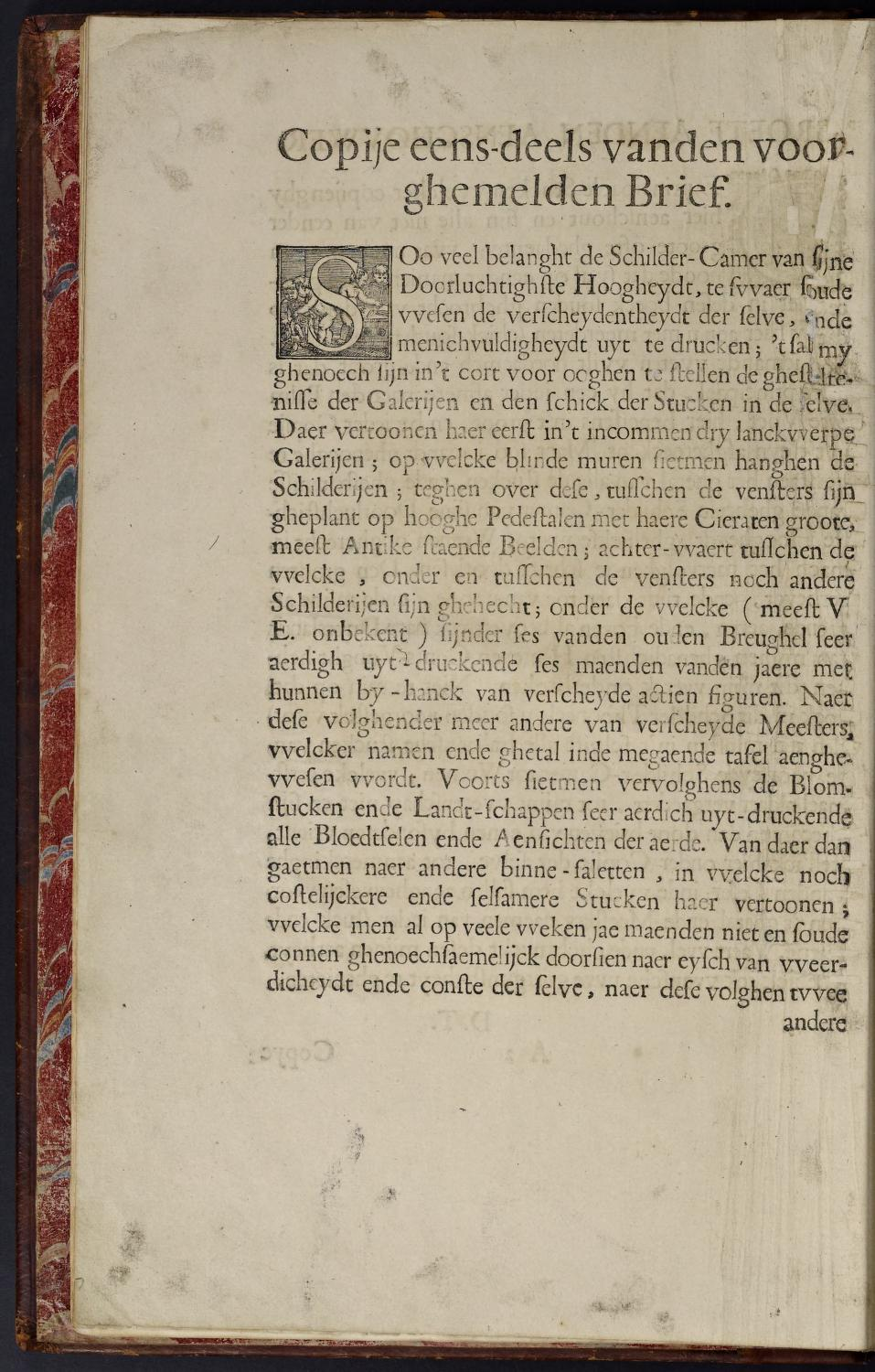

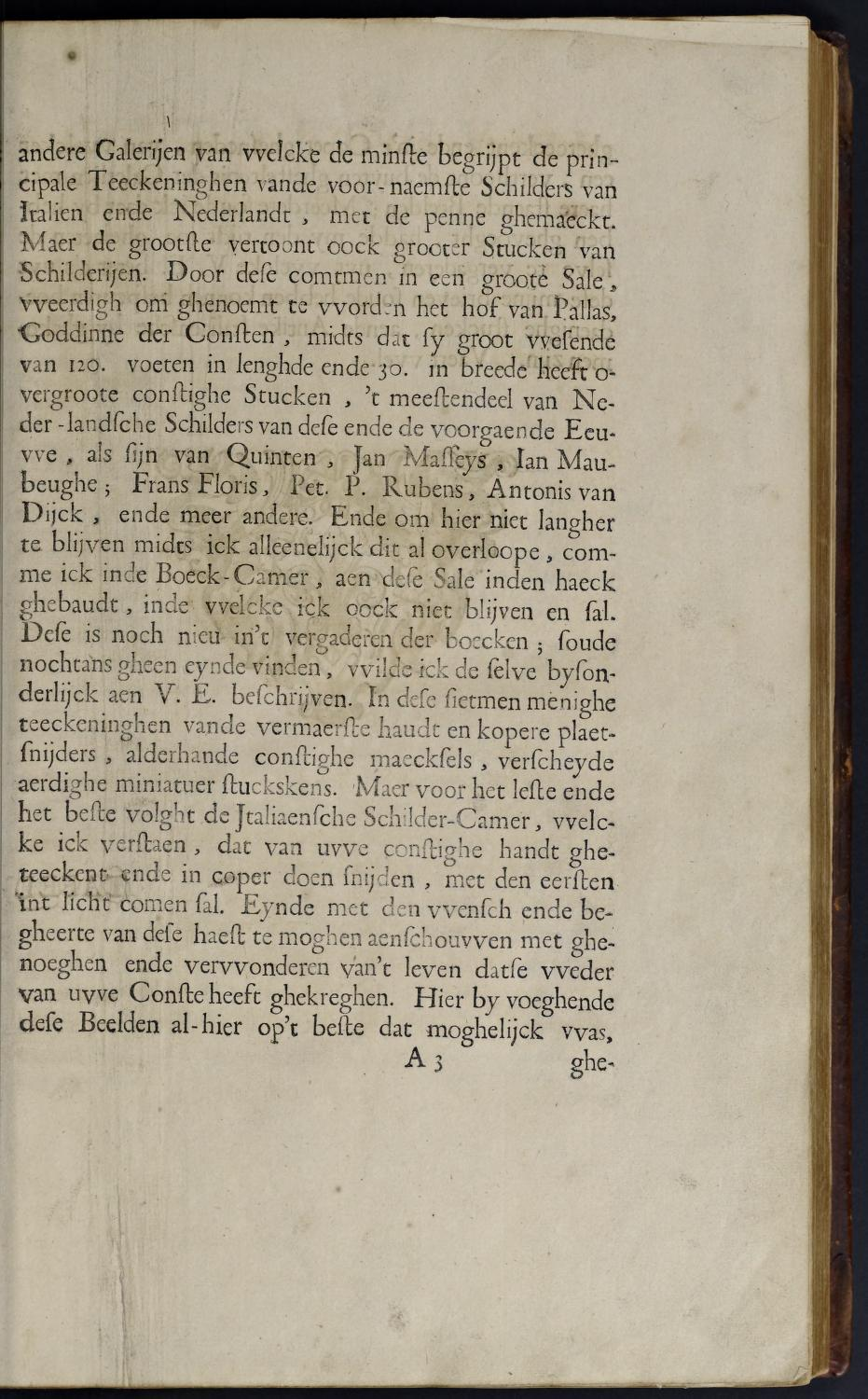

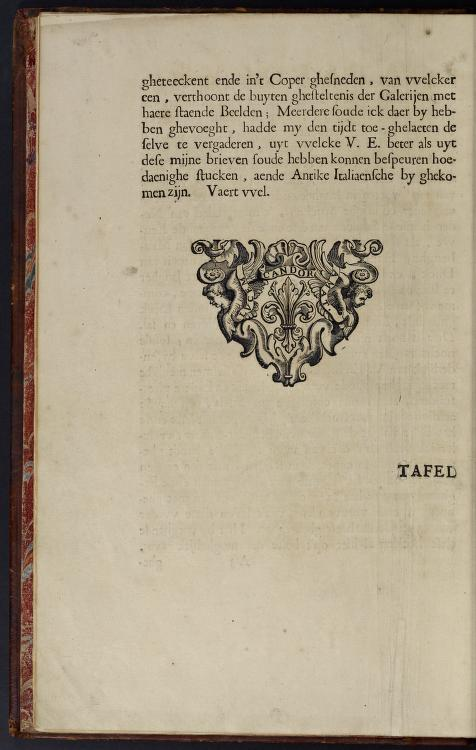

The latin text page clarifies that Teniers funded the publication project out of his own pocket. The Theatrum pictorium was published in four languages (Latin, French, Dutch, and Spanish) and further editions appeared in 1673 and 1688 and in the 18th century. The last edition was published in 1755.

== Execution of the modelli and associated engravings ==
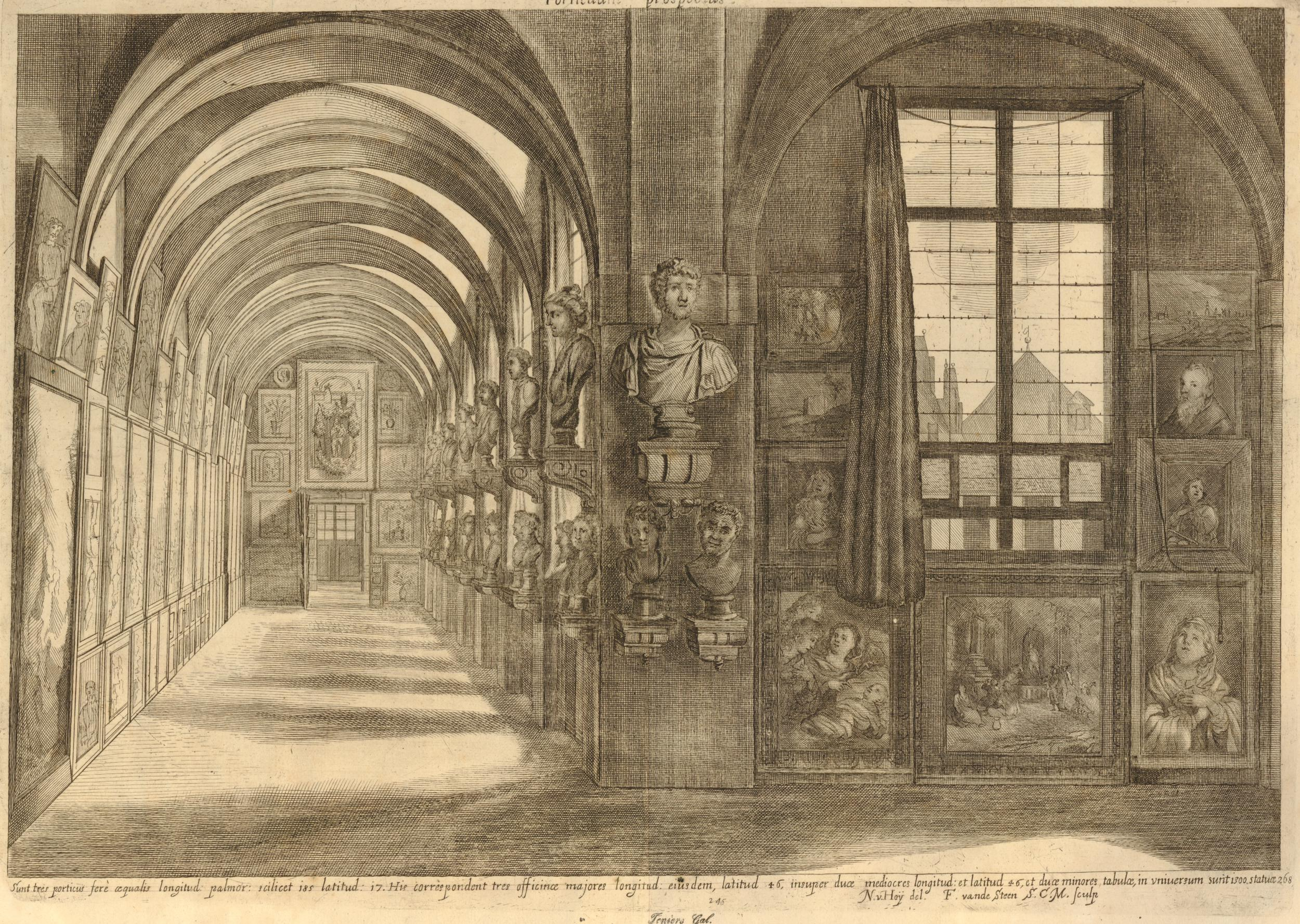
View into the Stallburg picture gallery of the Archduke Leopold in Vienna, 1656-1660, by Nikolaus van Hoy from Theatrum Pictorium, 1656–1660

In the preparation of this project, Teniers selected 245 paintings from the Archduke's large collection and made reduced modelli after the original works on panels of roughly 17 by 25 cm in dimensions. Most of these works were by Italian painters. Of the surviving modelli, 120 were auctioned off as part of the estate of John Spencer-Churchill, 7th Duke of Marlborough in 1886. The modelli are now spread among various collections. The Courtauld Institute of Art Gallery holds 14 of these works, the largest group in any public collection. These were then engraved on the same scale by a pool of 12 engravers. The principal engravers were: Jan van Troyen, Lucas Vorsterman II, Pieter van Lisebetten, Coryn Boel, Theodor van Kessel. Other engravers included Jan van Ossenbeeck, Franciscus van der Steen, Nikolaus van Hoy, Remoldus Eynhoudt, Coenraad Lauwers, Dominicus Claessens and Jan Popels.

== Modelli in use on large gallery paintings from 1651 ==
Teniers used full colour in the modelli, rather than grisaille. He used these to create his large gallery paintings with views of the most prized possessions of the Archduke's Brussels gallery, though some of these may have been created after the fact in Vienna and not Brussels. He painted several of these in various compositions which are now spread among various collections: Since several of these large views predate the published book of engravings, it is assumed that the miniatures visible on them and which are missing from the book or list of extant modelli were gifts from Teniers or the Archduke or commissioned especially by the recipient of the view.

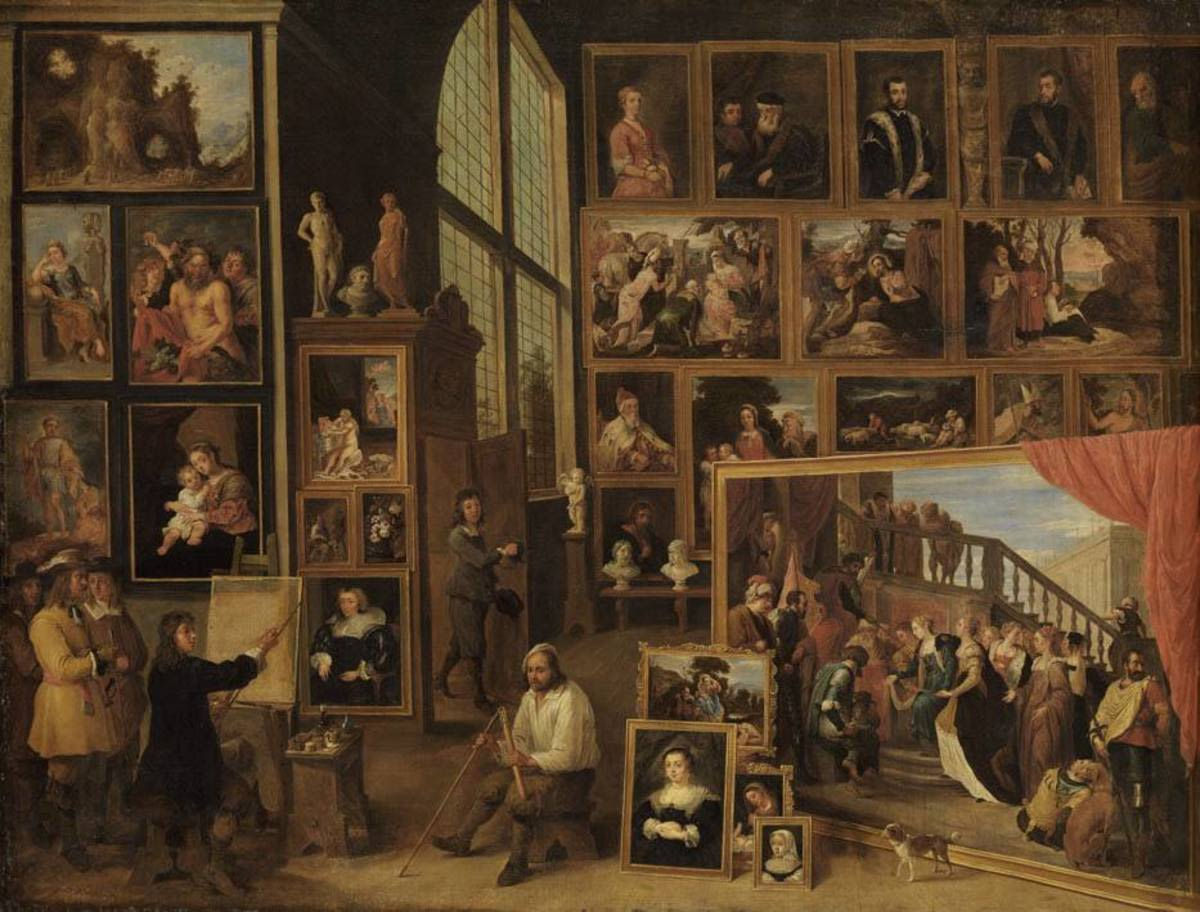
Gallery of Archduke Leopold Wilhelm in Brussels (I) Staatsgalerie im Neuen Schloss, Schleißheim

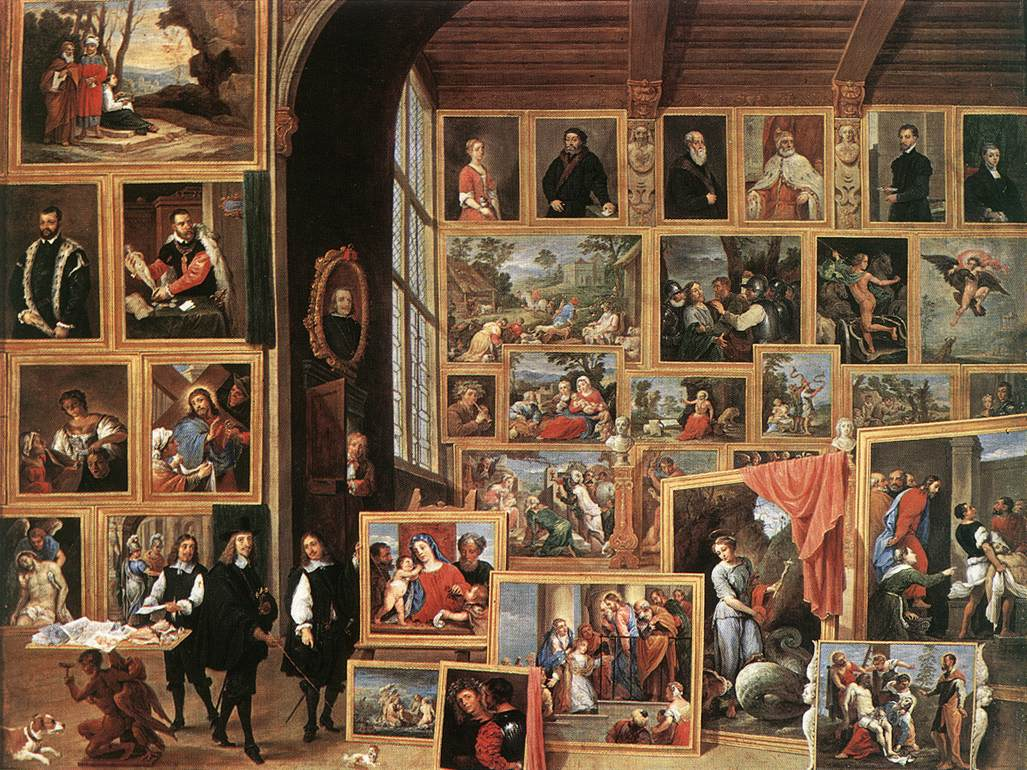
Gallery of Archduke Leopold Wilhelm in Brussels (Schleissheim), Staatsgalerie im Neuen Schloss, Schleißheim

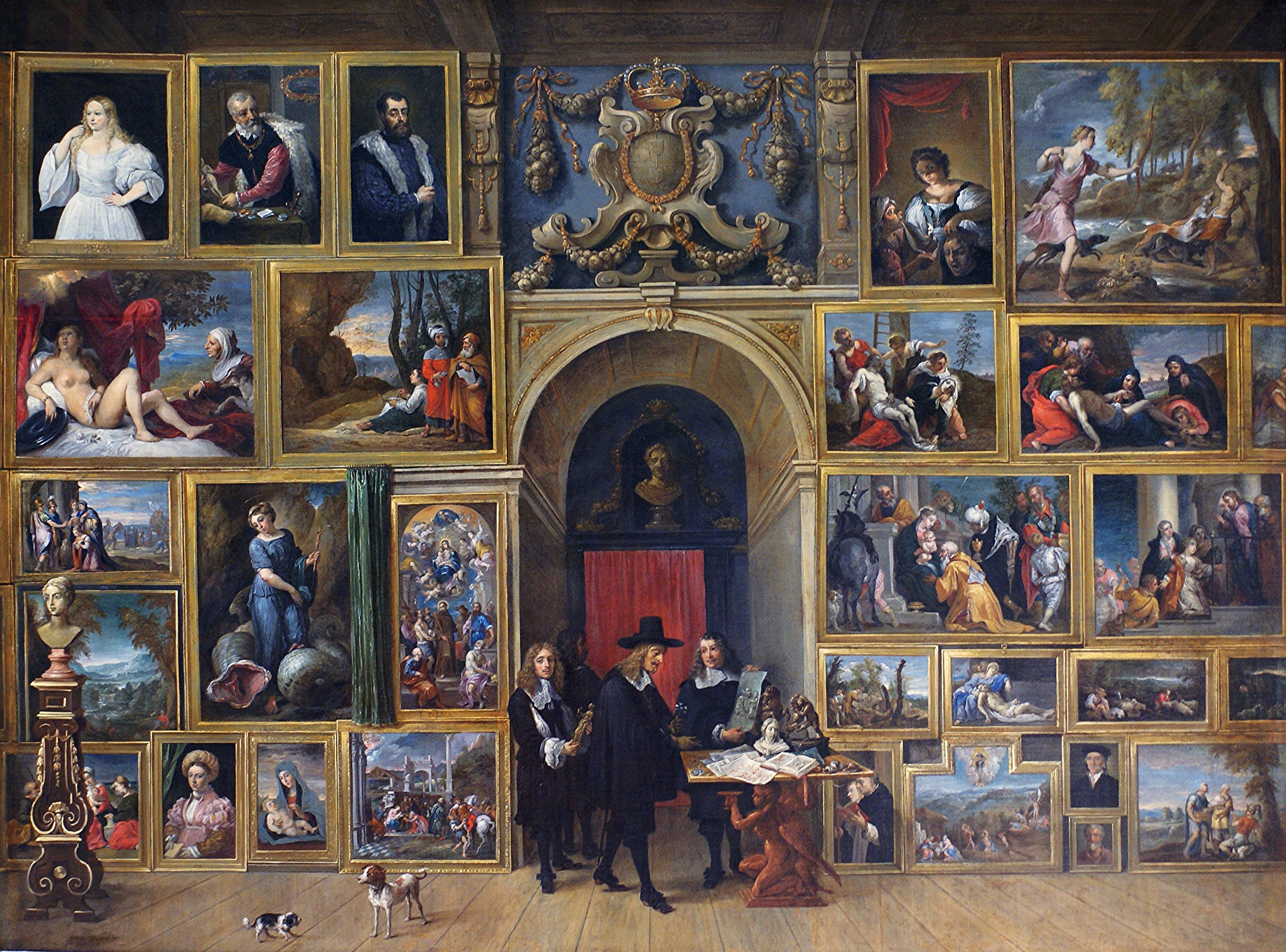
Gallery of Archduke Leopold Wilhelm (Brussels), Royal Museums of Fine Arts of Belgium, 1651

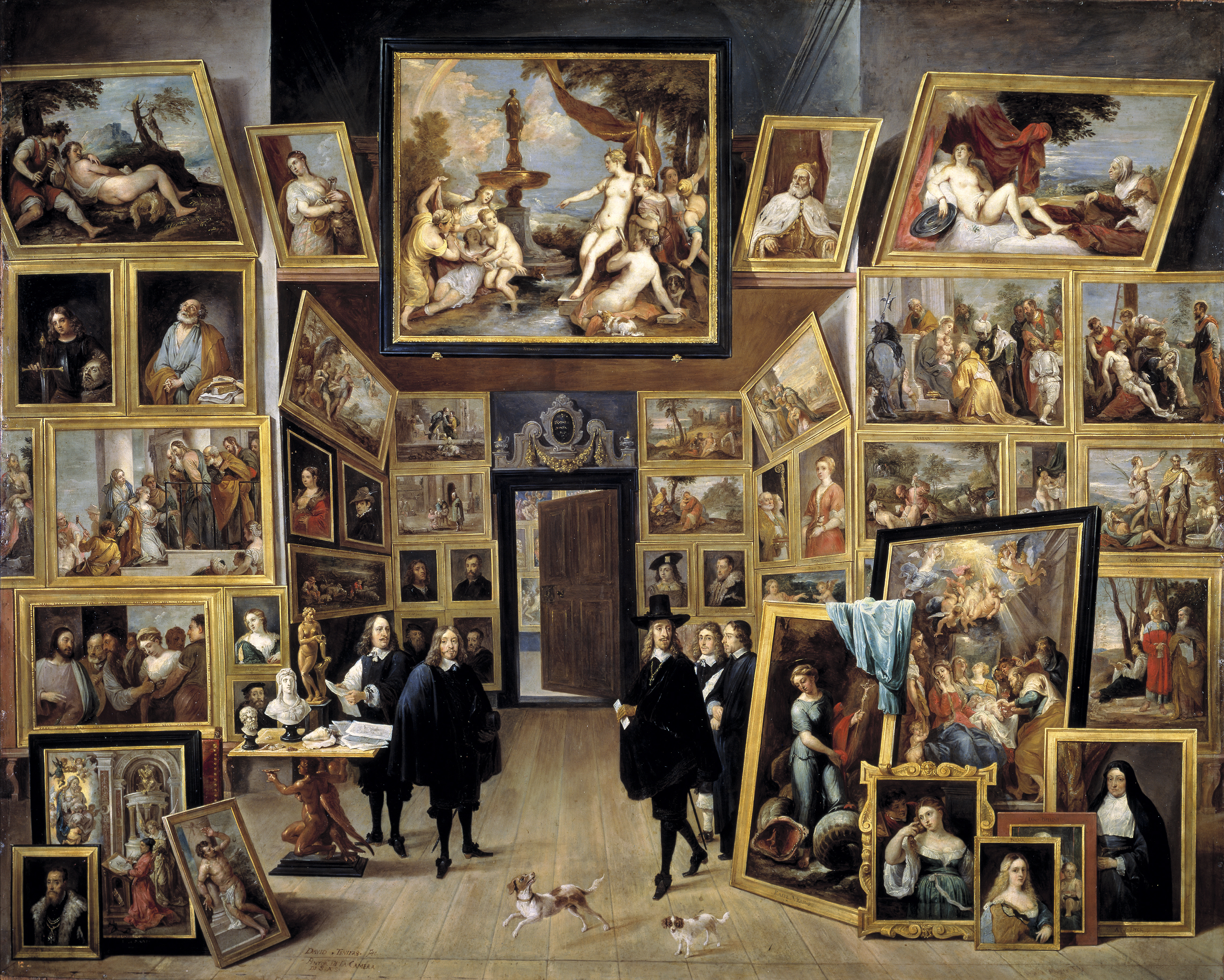
The Archduke Leopold Wilhelm in his Painting Gallery in Brussels, Prado

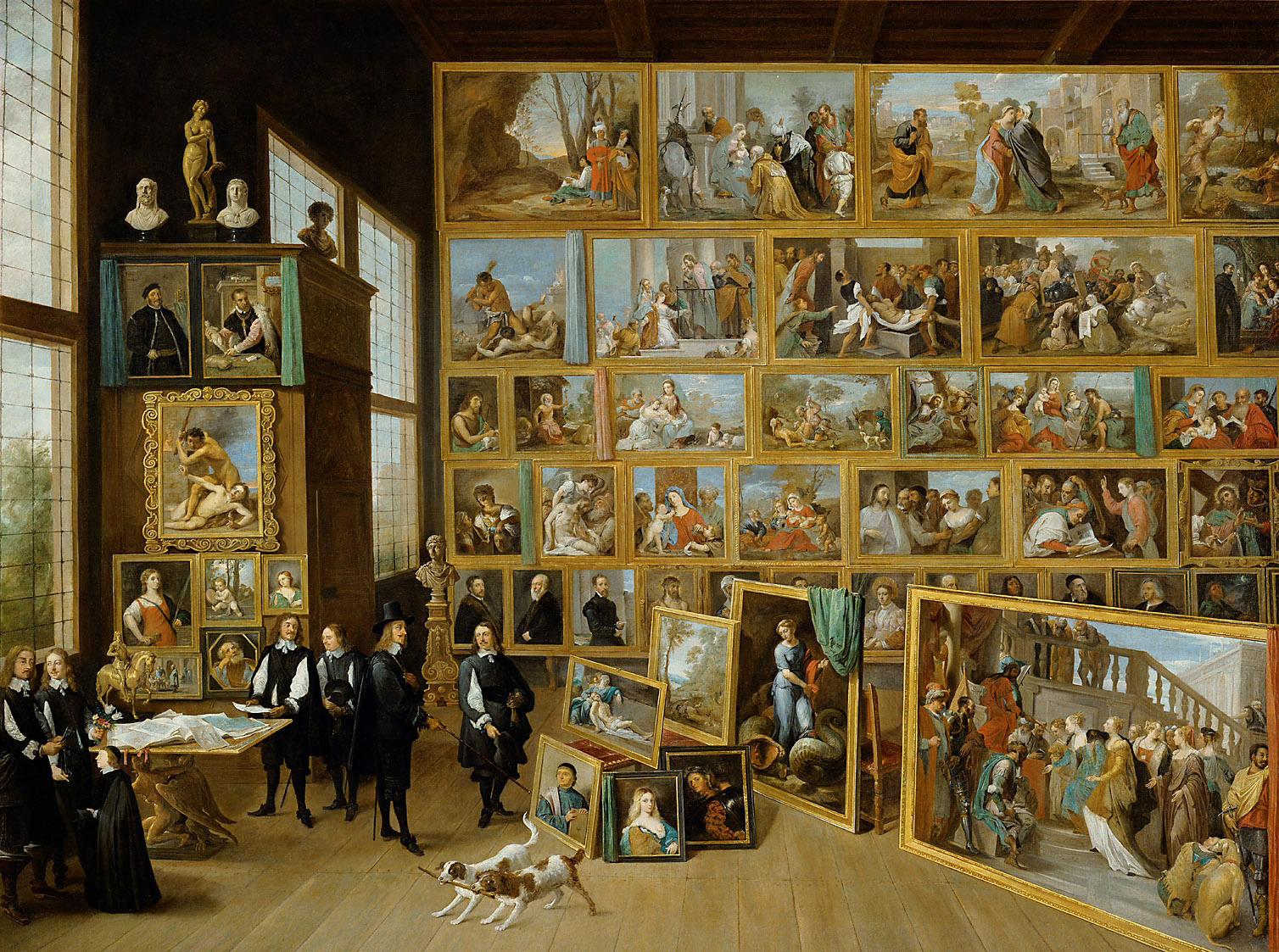
Gallery of Archduke Leopold Wilhelm in Brussels (Vienna), Kunsthistorisches Museum

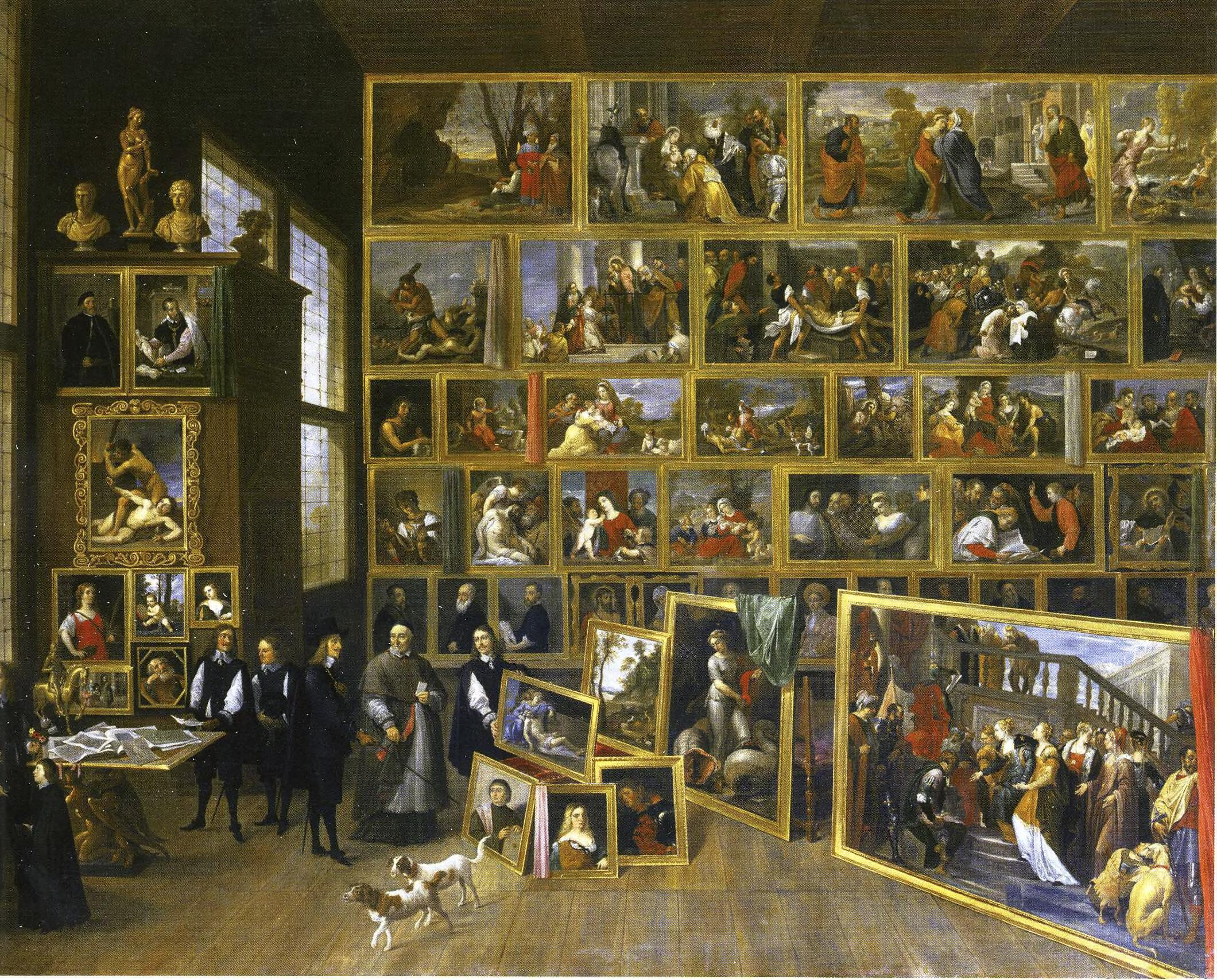
Gallery of Archduke Leopold Wilhelm in Brussels (Petworth), Petworth House

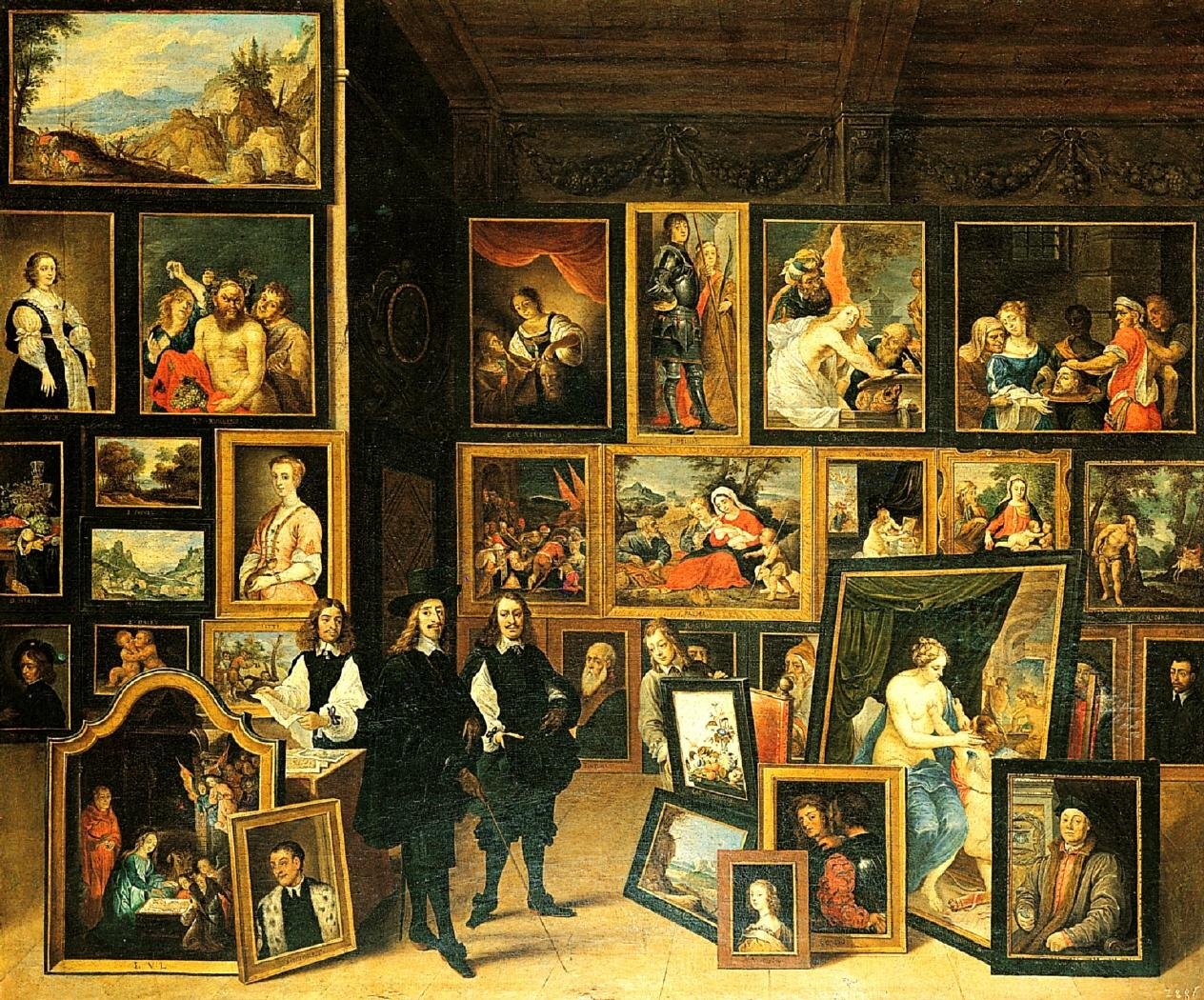
Gallery of Archduke Leopold Wilhelm in Brussels (Galdiano), Museo Lázaro Galdiano

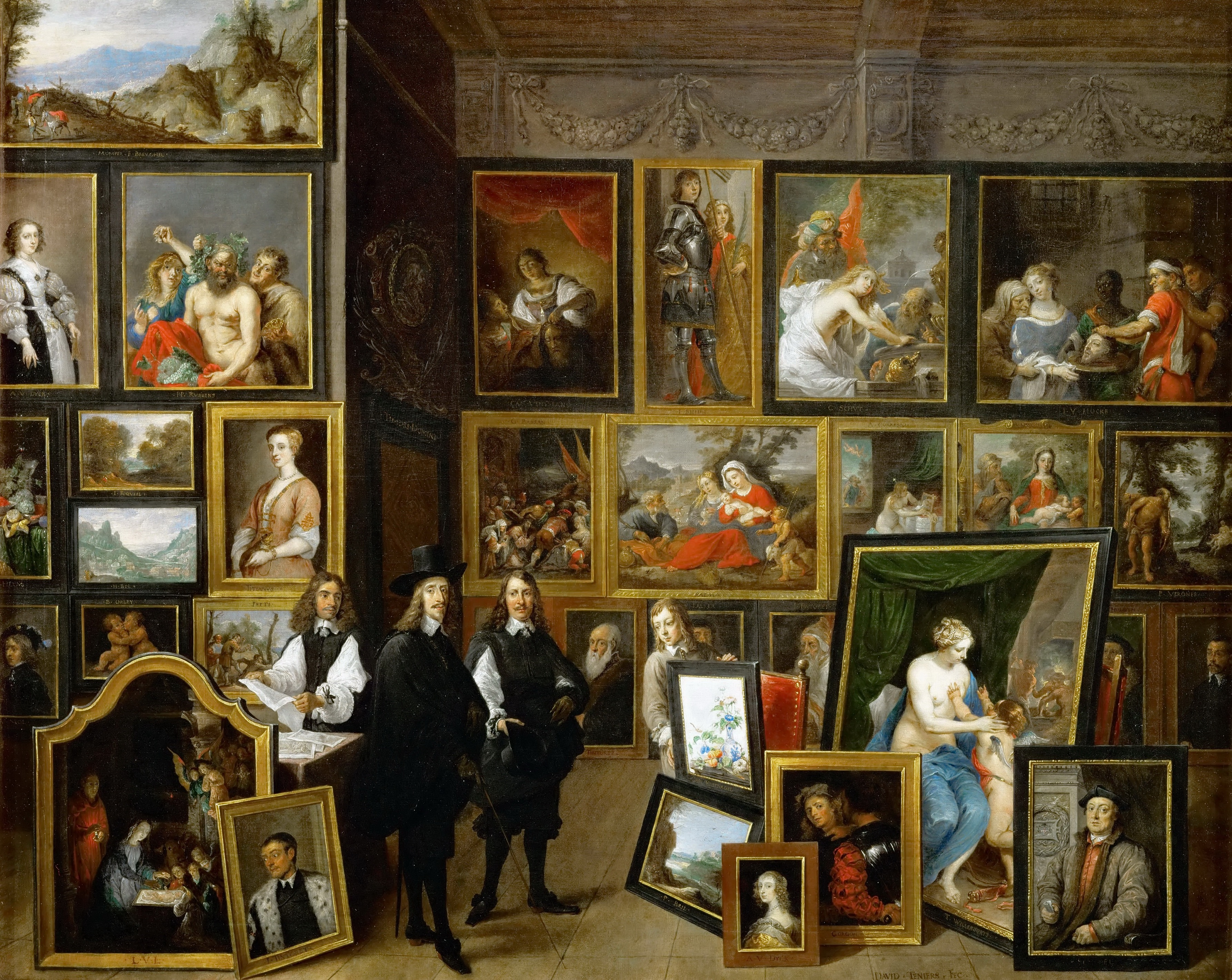
Gallery of Archduke Leopold Wilhelm in Brussels (Rothschild), Private collection

From the many modelli, which have been preserved, it is obvious that Teniers's copies constitute an adjusted record of the originals that could be made to fit on a book page and thus a few lack details or include more background. The engraving of the catalog by engravers who probably worked after the modelli rather than originals, was started by 1656. In the 17th century there existed no efficient method for inverting images. As a result, most of the prints in the catalog are reverse images of the originals. Each print gives the name of the author of the original work on the left hand side (indicated by the letter 'p' for 'pinxit', Latin for 'painted by') and the engraver of the print on the right hand side (indicated by the letter 's' for 'sculpsit', Latin for 'engraved by'). Some editions also indicated the original dimensions of the paintings.

== Selection of works ==
The publication comprised 243 engravings of important Italian paintings in the art collection of Archduke Leopold Wilhelm. While the project was initially planned to include the entire collection of the Archduke, the Archduke returned to Vienna before the project was completed. As a result, ultimately only a series of 246 plates was produced, of which 243 depicted about half of the Italian paintings then owned by the Archduke).

Teniers made a list of the painters in the collection as part of the forward to his 1673 catalog:

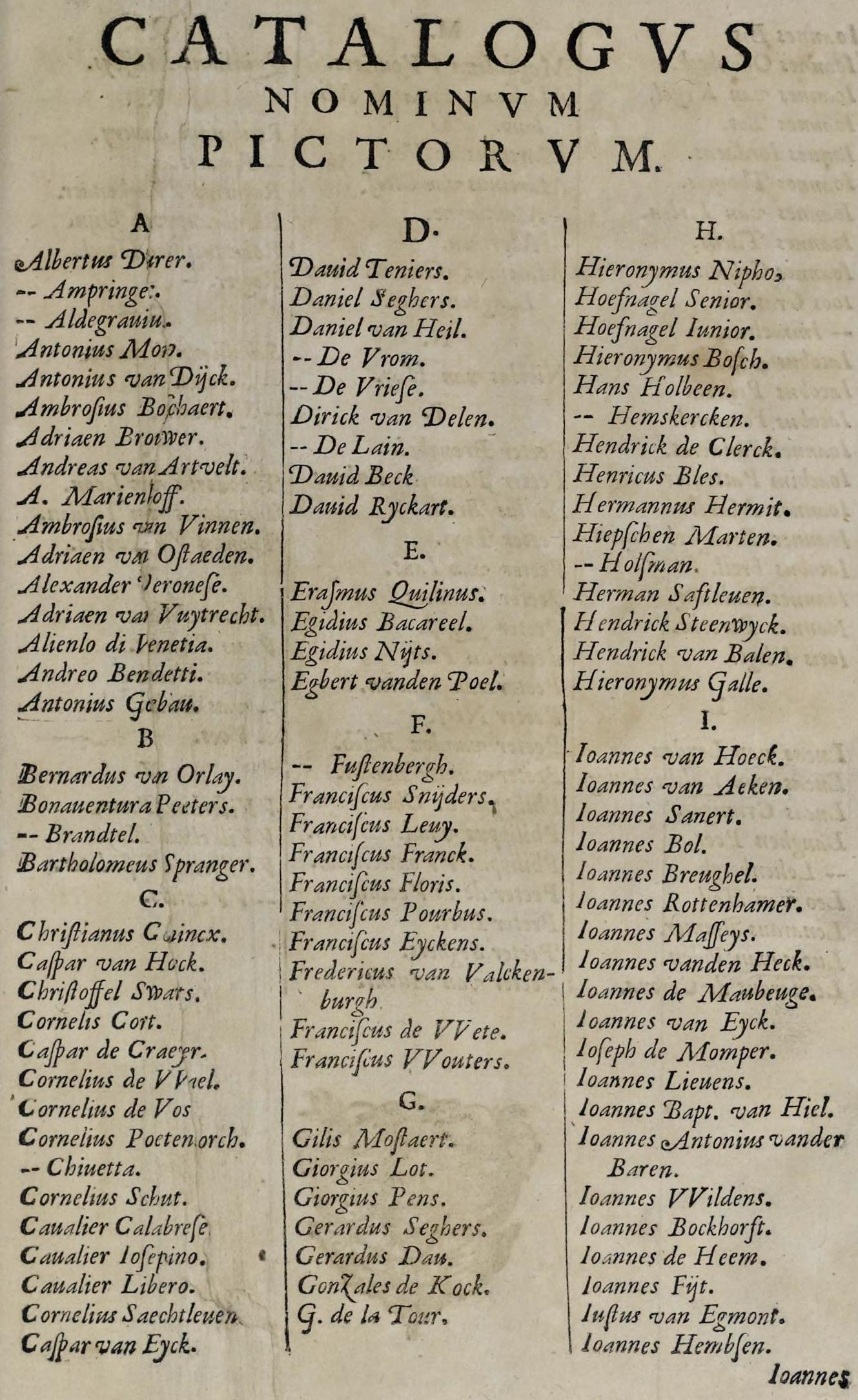

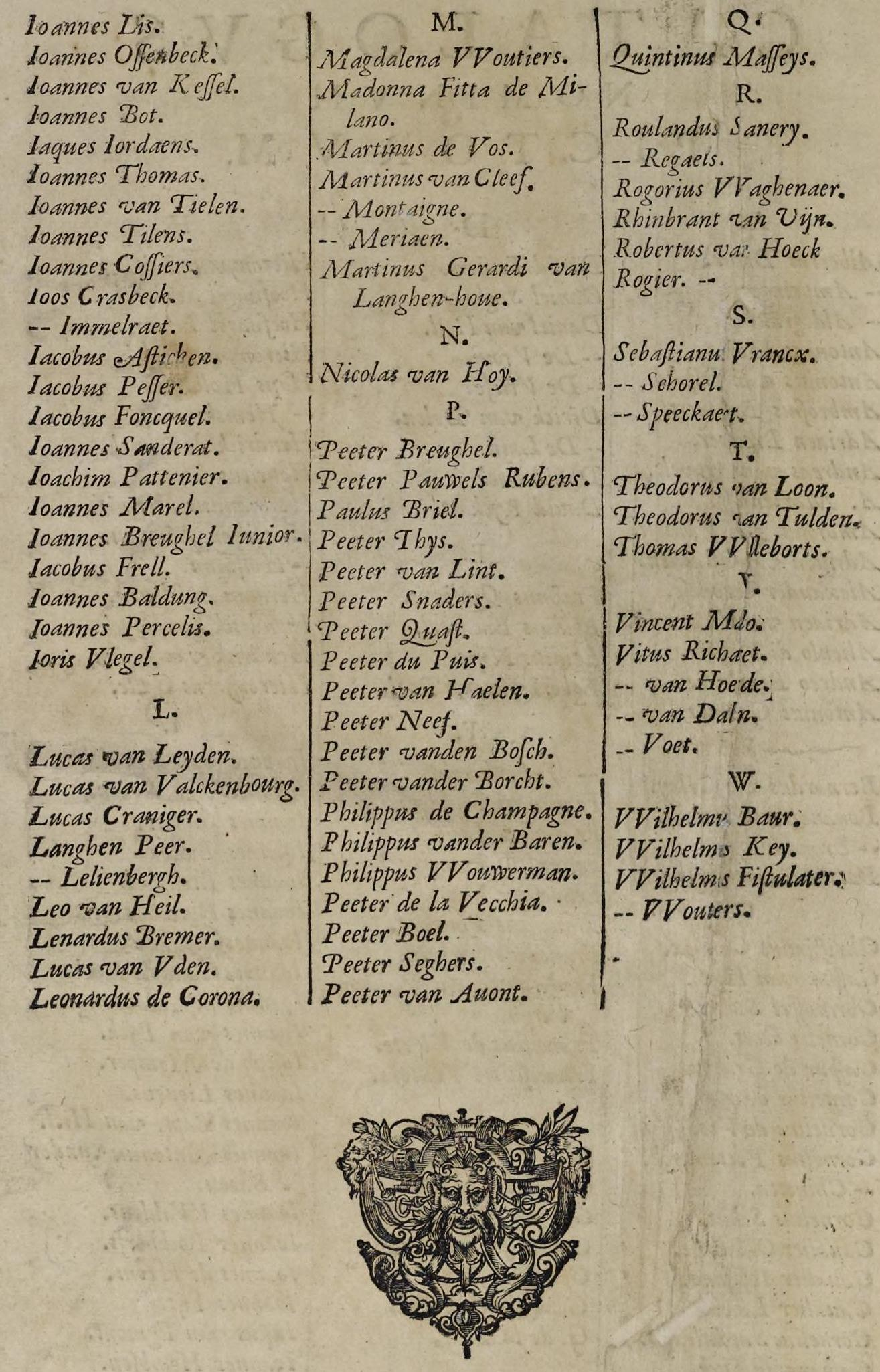

Of all the painters, Michaelina Wautier (who was not an Italian painter) and Madonna Fitta de Milano are the only women whose work is documented in the Archduke's collection.

Teniers's modelli and the Theatrum pictorium serve as a record for some important paintings the whereabouts of which are currently unknown. For instance, the modelli in the Metropolitan Museum of Art of the Old Age in Search of Youth attributed by Teniers to Correggio and the Adam and Eve after Padovanino are the most important records of these lost paintings.

The Theatrum Pictorium had an important impact on the manner in which collections were organised, appreciated and published and continued to be used as a reference book during the 18th century.

== Surviving works ==
The works listed in the Theatrum pictorium that survive are generally in the Kunsthistorisches Museum, while the modelli or small models for the engravings have been lost or are in other collections. The engravings and the modelli were inscribed with the dimensions of the original paintings, though their characteristics were often adjusted to take advantage of the maximum illustration possibilities of the album page size. The dimensions were in the form "4 alta 3 lata", which means 4 palm-widths high and 3 palm-widths wide, such as the case with the engraving after Bassano's Boy with a Flute:

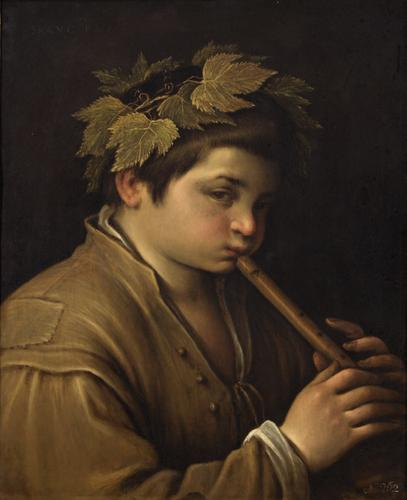
Example of a painting by Francesco Bassano the Younger in the Kunsthistorisches Museum

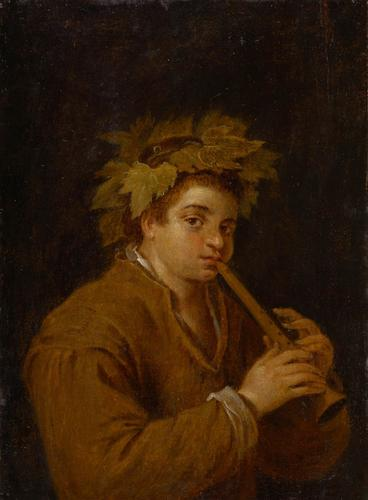
Example of a modello by David Teniers the Younger after Bassano, also in the Kunsthistorisches Museum

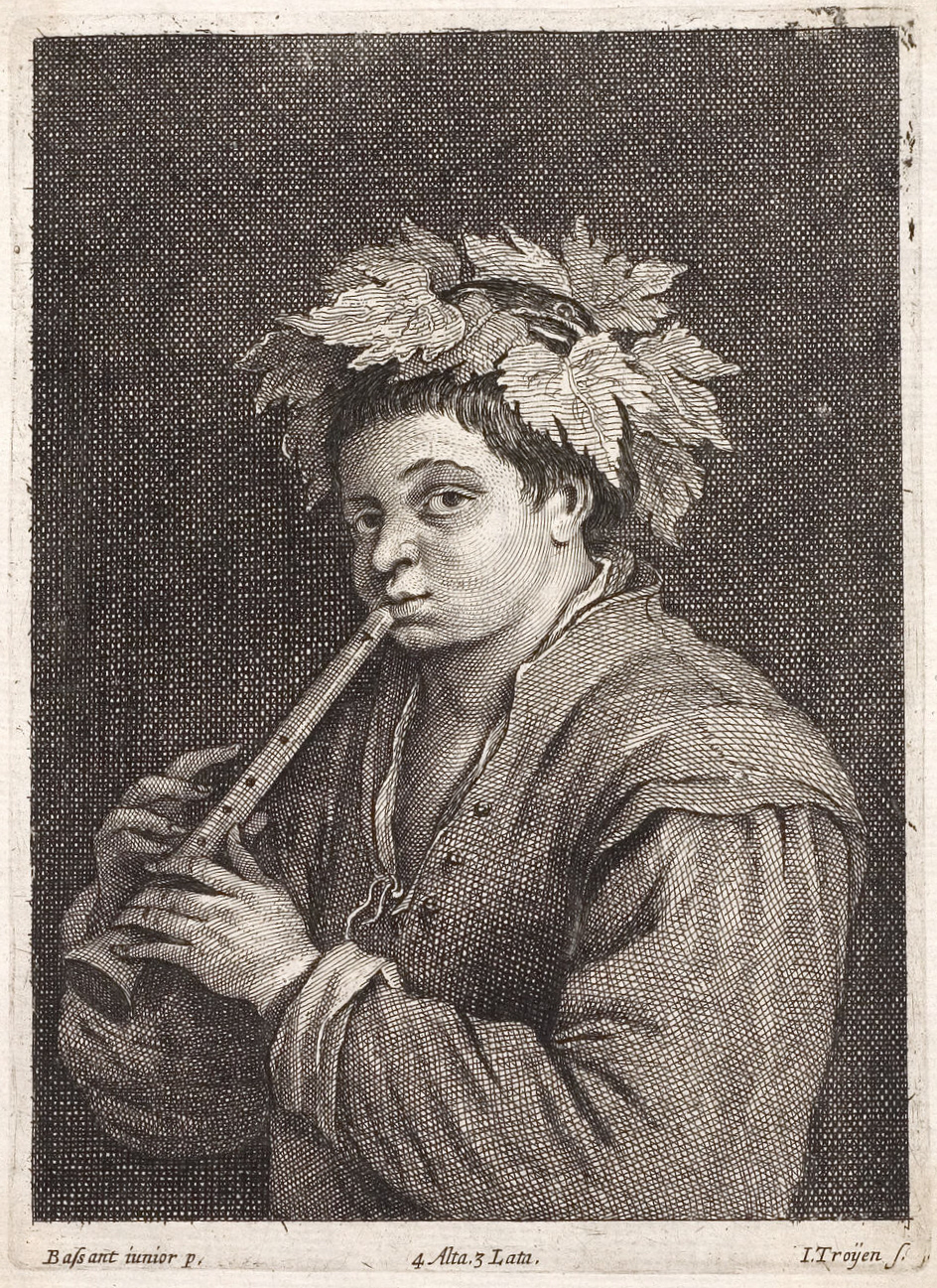
Example of an engraving from the first, 1660, edition of the Theatrum Pictorium by Jan van Troyen after the Bassano painting

== List of engravings (matched to painting or modello) ==
engraving	painting (or modello)	catalog nr.	engraver	size (palme)	attr. collection / attr. Engraving	date	collection	collection ID nr.
		1	Jan van Troyen		David Teniers the Younger / David Teniers II	1670	private collection	
		2	Jan van Troyen	12 alta 6 lata	Raphael / Raphael	1518	Kunsthistorisches Museum	GG_171
		3	Nikolaus van Hoy	4 alta 3 lata	Girolamo da Treviso the Younger / Raphael	1525	Kunsthistorisches Museum	GG_128
		4	Lucas Vorsterman	4 alta 3 lata	Antonello da Messina / Giovanni Bellini	1475	Kunsthistorisches Museum	GG_7727
		5	Peter van Lisebetten	8 alta 4 lata	Antonello da Messina / Giovanni Bellini	1475	Kunsthistorisches Museum	GG_2574
		6	Jan Popels	8 alta 6 lata	David Teniers the Younger / Giovanni Bellini	1656	Courtauld Gallery	P.1978.PG.439
		7	Jan Popels	4 alta 5 lata	Giovanni Bellini / Giovanni Bellini	1515	Kunsthistorisches Museum	GG_97
		8	Peter van Lisebetten	7 alta 10 lata	unknown / Giovanni Bellini	1656	private collection	
		9	Lucas Vorsterman	4 alta 3 lata	David Teniers the Younger / Giovanni Bellini	1660s	Kunsthistorisches Museum	GG_6784
		10	Quirijn Boel	5 alta 3 lata	Marco Basaiti / Marco Basaiti	1515	Kunsthistorisches Museum	GG_116
		11	Quirijn Boel	5 alta 4 lata	Jan Swart van Groningen / Michelangelo	1560	private collection	
		12	Nikolaus van Hoy and Franciscus van der Steen	5 alta 4 lata	unknown / Michelangelo	1550s	National Gallery	NG8
		13	Lucas Vorsterman	5 alta 3 lata	Vincenzo Catena / Giorgione	1525	Pinacoteca Querini Stampalia	
		14	Jan van Troyen	5 alta 4 lata	Girolamo Savoldo / Giorgione	1520s	Kunsthistorisches Museum	GG_2633
		15	Lucas Vorsterman	6 alta 4 lata	unknown / Giorgione	1656	private collection	
		16	Lucas Vorsterman	6 alta 4 lata	Palma Vecchio / Giorgione	1528	Kunsthistorisches Museum	GG_57
		17	Quirijn Boel	4 alta 6 lata	unknown / Giorgione			
		18	Theodor van Kessel	2 alta 4 lata	David Teniers the Younger / Giorgione	1655	Art Institute of Chicago	1936.125
		19	Theodor van Kessel	4 alta 6 lata	Polidoro da Lanciano / Giorgione	1530s	Kunsthistorisches Museum	GG_51
		20	Jan van Troyen	7 alta 10 lata	Giorgione / Giorgione	1500s	Kunsthistorisches Museum	GG_111
		21	Theodor van Kessel	8 alta 11 lata	David Teniers the Younger / Giorgione	1656	Royal Museums of Fine Arts of Belgium	12206
		22	Theodor van Kessel	4 alta 3 lata	unknown / Giorgione	1520	Kunsthistorisches Museum	GG_347
		23	Jan van Troyen	5 alta 4 lata	Titian / Giorgione	1520	Kunsthistorisches Museum	GG_64
		24	Jan van Troyen	5 alta 4 lata	Giorgione / Giorgione	1505	Kunsthistorisches Museum	GG_1526
		25	Lucas Vorsterman	5 alta 4 lata	Giorgione / Giorgione	1510	Kunsthistorisches Museum	GG_74
		26	Jan van Troyen	6 alta 4 lata	unknown / Giulio Romano	1536	Kunsthistorisches Museum	GG_157
		27	Jan van Troyen	4 alta 3 lata	Bernardino Luini / Leonardo da Vinci	1525	Kunsthistorisches Museum	GG_190
		28	Jan van Troyen	5 alta 3 lata	Andrea Mantegna / Andrea Mantegna	1456	Kunsthistorisches Museum	GG_301
		29	Jan van Troyen	4 alta 3 lata	Bartolomeo Schedoni / Antonio Correggio	1607	Kunsthistorisches Museum	GG_1615
		30	Theodor van Kessel	3 alta 2 lata	David Teniers the Younger / Antonio Correggio	1655	Philadelphia Museum of Art	Cat. 696
		31	Quirijn Boel	3 alta 2 lata	David Teniers the Younger / Antonio Correggio	1655	Metropolitan Museum of Art	1975.1.126
		32	Nikolaus van Hoy and Franciscus van der Steen	7 alta 6 lata	Franciabigio / Andrea del Sarto	1520	Kunsthistorisches Museum	GG_206
		33	Dominicus Claessens	4 1/2 alta 3 1/2 lata	Giulio Cesare Procaccini / Procaccino	1610s	Kunsthistorisches Museum	GG_1617
		34	Nikolaus van Hoy	7 alta 6 lata	unknown / Barotius			
		35	Nikolaus van Hoy and Jan van Ossenbeeck	7 alta 6 1/2 lata	unknown / Polidor			
		36	Quirijn Boel	6 alta 4 lata	David Teniers the Younger / Padovanino	1655	Metropolitan Museum of Art	1975.1.127
		37	Jan van Troyen	7 alta 5 lata	Alessandro Varotari / Padovanino	1630s	Kunsthistorisches Museum	GG_80
		38	Peter van Lisebetten	8 alta 6 lata	unknown / Primaticcio			
		39	Jan van Troyen	6 alta 5 lata	Carlo Saraceni / Carlo Saraceni	1613	Kunsthistorisches Museum	GG_41
		40	Peter van Lisebetten	2 alta 3 lata	Annibale Carracci / Annibale Carracci	1603	Kunsthistorisches Museum	GG_230
		41	Jan van Troyen	3 alta 2 lata	David Teniers the Younger / Annibale Carracci	1656	Courtauld Gallery	P.1978.PG.431
		42	Theodor van Kessel	4 alta 8 lata	Annibale Carracci / Annibale Carracci	1605	Kunsthistorisches Museum	GG_267
		43	Theodor van Kessel	4 alta 8 lata	unknown / Carlo Maratta / Annibale Carracci			
		44	Jan van Troyen	5 alta 4 lata	unknown / Domenico Fetti			
		45	Peter van Lisebetten	3 alta 2 lata	unknown / Polidoro de Venise			
		46	Peter van Lisebetten	4 alta 5 lata	unknown / Polidoro de Venise			
		47	Peter van Lisebetten	4 alta 6 lata	unknown / Polidoro de Venise			
		48	Peter van Lisebetten	4 alta 6 lata	unknown / Polidoro de Venise			
		49	Jan van Troyen	5 alta 7 lata	unknown / Polidoro de Venise			
		50	Nikolaus van Hoy	3 alta 2 lata	unknown / Titian			
		51	Lucas Vorsterman	6 alta 4 lata	Titian / Titian	1570	private collection	
		52	Lucas Vorsterman	4 alta 3 lata	unknown / Titian			
		53	Lucas Vorsterman	5 alta 3 lata	unknown / Titian	1560	Kunsthistorisches Museum	GG_315
		54	Jan van Troyen	5 alta 4 lata	Giampietro Silvio / Titian	1542	Kunsthistorisches Museum	GG_1537
		55	Jan van Troyen	5 alta 4 lata	unknown / Titian			
		56	Lucas Vorsterman	7 alta 5 lata	unknown / Titian	1538	Kunsthistorisches Museum	GG_1552
		57	Jan van Troyen	5 alta 4 lata	Titian / Titian	1520	Kunsthistorisches Museum	GG_94
		58	Lucas Vorsterman	7 alta 5 lata	unknown / Titian	1625	Kunsthistorisches Museum	GG_59
		59	Lucas Vorsterman	6 alta 4 lata	Giovanni Battista Moroni / Titian	1552	Kunsthistorisches Museum	GG_78
		60	Peter van Lisebetten	7 alta 10 lata	Titian / Titian	1570s	Kunsthistorisches Museum	GG_1825
		61	Nikolaus van Hoy and Franciscus van der Steen	4 alta 5 lata	Titian / Titian	1514	Alte Pinakothek	977
		62	Lucas Vorsterman	5 alta 7 lata	Titian / Titian	1516	Kunsthistorisches Museum	GG_118
		63	Theodor van Kessel	3 alta 4 lata	Titian / Titian	1512	Longleat	
		64	Peter van Lisebetten	4 alta 5 lata	Titian / Titian	1510s	Kunsthistorisches Museum	GG_95
		65	Peter van Lisebetten	6 alta 9 lata	David Teniers the Younger / Titian	1656	Department of Paintings of the Louvre	MI 1005
		66	Lucas Vorsterman	2 alta 3 lata	David Teniers the Younger / Titian	1656	private collection	
		67	Jan van Troyen	5 alta 7 lata	Titian / Titian	1520	Kunsthistorisches Museum	GG_114
		68	Peter van Lisebetten	5 alta 6 lata	Titian / Titian	1520s	Kunsthistorisches Museum	GG_93
		69	Quirijn Boel	4 alta 6 lata	David Teniers the Younger / Titian	1655	Art Institute of Chicago	1936.124
		70	Quirijn Boel	4 alta 5 lata	unknown / Titian			
		71	Nikolaus van Hoy and Franciscus van der Steen	4 1/2 alta 5 1/2 lata	Titian / Titian	1530	Uffizi	952
		72	Peter van Lisebetten	6 alta 10 lata	unknown / Titian			
		73	Peter van Lisebetten	9 alta 12 lata	Titian / Titian	1559	National Gallery	NG6420
		74	Peter van Lisebetten	6 alta 10 lata	David Teniers the Younger after Titian / Titian	1656	private collection	
		75	Nikolaus van Hoy and Franciscus van der Steen	6 alta 5 lata	Titian / Titian	1534	Kunsthistorisches Museum	GG_83
		76	Lucas Vorsterman	7 alta 5 lata	Lorenzo Lotto / Titian	1527s	Kunsthistorisches Museum	GG_265
		77	Theodor van Kessel	4 alta 3 lata	Titian / Titian	1560s	Kunsthistorisches Museum	GG_98
		78	Jan van Troyen	5 alta 4 lata	Titian / Titian		Brukenthal National Museum	3186
		79	Lucas Vorsterman	7 alta 5 lata	Tintoretto / Titian	1554	Kunsthistorisches Museum	GG_48
		80	Peter van Lisebetten	4 alta 3 lata	unknown / Titian	1510	Kunsthistorisches Museum	GG_96
		81	Jan van Troyen	6 alta 5 lata	Titian / Titian	1540	Kunsthistorisches Museum	GG_84
		82	Jan Popels	6 alta 5 lata	Andrea Schiavone / Titian	1562	Kunsthistorisches Museum	GG_2364
		83	Lucas Vorsterman	7 alta 5 lata	unknown / Titian			
		84	Jan van Troyen	5 alta 4 lata	unknown / Titian	1670s	Kunsthistorisches Museum	GG_1571
		85	Lucas Vorsterman	4 alta 3 lata	Titian / Titian	1538	Kunsthistorisches Museum	GG_72
		86	Lucas Vorsterman	7 alta 5 lata	Lambert Sustris / Titian	1560	Kunsthistorisches Museum	GG_77
		87	Lucas Vorsterman	7 alta 5 lata	unknown / Titian			
		88	Lucas Vorsterman	7 alta 5 lata	Titian / Titian	1540	Kunsthistorisches Museum	GG_91
		89	Lucas Vorsterman	7 alta 5 lata	Titian / Titian	1558	Kunsthistorisches Museum	GG_1605
		90	Lucas Vorsterman	7 alta 6 lata	David Teniers the Younger after Titian / Titian	1656	private collection	
		91	Jan van Troyen	7 alta 5 lata	Titian / Titian	1565	Kunsthistorisches Museum	GG_3379
		92	Lucas Vorsterman	7 alta 5 lata	Titian / Titian	1567	Kunsthistorisches Museum	GG_81
		93	Lucas Vorsterman	7 alta 6 lata	Titian / Titian	1560	Wallraf-Richartz Museum	WRM 332
		94	Lucas Vorsterman	5 alta 4 lata	David Teniers the Younger / Titian	1656	private collection	
		95	Lucas Vorsterman	7 alta 6 lata	Titian / Titian	1560	Kunsthistorisches Museum	GG_76
		96	Theodor van Kessel	10 alta 12 lata	Titian / Titian	1568	Kunsthistorisches Museum	GG_71
		97	Lucas Vorsterman	6 alta 4 lata	Palma il Giovane / Tintoretto	1580s	Kunsthistorisches Museum	GG_38
		98	Lucas Vorsterman	7 alta 5 lata	unknown / Tintoretto		Kunsthistorisches Museum	GG_3062
		99	Peter van Lisebetten	8 alta 6 lata	Titian / Tintoretto	1561	El Escorial	
		100	Peter van Lisebetten	6 alta 5 lata	unknown / Tintoretto			
		101	Lucas Vorsterman	6 alta 3 lata	Titian / Tintoretto	1565	Kunsthistorisches Museum	GG_37
		102	Jan van Troyen	7 alta 5 lata	unknown / Tintoretto	1656	private collection	
		103	Lucas Vorsterman	6 alta 4 lata	Tintoretto / Tintoretto		Kunsthistorisches Museum	GG_25
		104	Lucas Vorsterman	6 alta 4 lata	unknown / Tintoretto			
		105	Theodor van Kessel	5 alta 8 lata	unknown / Tintoretto			
		106	Nikolaus van Hoy	3 1/2 alta 5 1/2 lata	Domenico Tintoretto / Tintoretto	1580s	Indianapolis Museum of Art	2014.82
		107	Nikolaus van Hoy and Jan van Ossenbeeck	5 1/2 alta 10 lata	Lodewijk Toeput / Tintoretto		Kunsthistorisches Museum	GG_2524
		108	Nikolaus van Hoy and Jan van Ossenbeeck	9 alta 13 lata	unknown / Tintoretto			
		109	Peter van Lisebetten	5 alta 7 lata	Tintoretto / Tintoretto	1547	Kunsthistorisches Museum	GG_1565
		110	Jan van Troyen	10 alta 17 lata	David Teniers the Younger / Pordenone	1656	private collection	
		111	Peter van Lisebetten	8 alta 4 lata	Tintoretto / Paolo Veronese	1555	Kunsthistorisches Museum	GG_1544
		112	Quirijn Boel	8 alta 4 lata	Paolo Veronese / Paolo Veronese	1580	Kunsthistorisches Museum	GG_1545
		113	Nikolaus van Hoy and Franciscus van der Steen	6 1/2 alta 6 lata	Paolo Veronese / Paolo Veronese	1580	Kunsthistorisches Museum	GG_34
		114	Theodor van Kessel	7 alta 4 lata	Paolo Veronese / Paolo Veronese	1565	Kunsthistorisches Museum	GG_1538
		115	Quirijn Boel	4 alta 3 lata	Paolo Veronese / Paolo Veronese	1586	Kunsthistorisches Museum	GG_1525
		116	Theodor van Kessel	4 alta 3 lata	Paolo Veronese / Paolo Veronese	1586	Kunsthistorisches Museum	GG_1527
		117	Peter van Lisebetten	8 alta 5 lata	unknown / Paolo Veronese	1580s	Kunsthistorisches Museum	GG_1542
		118	Jan van Troyen	7 alta 10 lata	Paolo Veronese / Paolo Veronese	1588	Kunsthistorisches Museum	GG_1514
		119	Peter van Lisebetten	7 alta 10 lata	Paolo Veronese / Paolo Veronese	1588	Kunsthistorisches Museum	GG_3825
		120	Peter van Lisebetten	4 alta 5 lata	unknown / Paolo Veronese	1590	Kunsthistorisches Museum	GG_1529
		121	Jan van Troyen	4 alta 5 lata	unknown / Paolo Veronese	1580s	Kunsthistorisches Museum	GG_50
		122	Theodor van Kessel	7 alta 10 lata	unknown / Paolo Veronese			
		123	Jan van Troyen	7 alta 10 lata	Paolo Veronese / Paolo Veronese	1585	Kunsthistorisches Museum	GG_1515
		124	Jan van Troyen	6 alta 9 lata	Paolo Veronese / Paolo Veronese	1560s	Kunsthistorisches Museum	GG_52
		125	Wenceslaus Hollar	10 alta 15 lata	Paolo Veronese / Paolo Veronese	1555	Uffizi	912
		126	Theodor van Kessel	2 alta 3 lata	Andrea Schiavone / Andrea Schiavone	1543	Kunsthistorisches Museum	GG_115
		127	Quirijn Boel	5 alta 3 lata	David Teniers the Younger / Andrea Schiavone	1655	Philadelphia Museum of Art	Cat. 695
		128	Theodor van Kessel	2 alta 1 lata	Andrea Schiavone / Andrea Schiavone	1544	Kunsthistorisches Museum	GG_1991
		129	Theodor van Kessel	2 alta 1 lata	Andrea Schiavone / Andrea Schiavone	1544	Kunsthistorisches Museum	GG_356
		130	Coenraad Lauwers	5 alta 4 lata	unknown / Andrea Schiavone			
		131	Coenraad Lauwers	5 alta 4 lata	David Teniers the Younger / Andrea Schiavone	1656	Courtauld Gallery	P.1978.PG.430
		132	Theodor van Kessel	4 alta 3 lata	Andrea Schiavone / Andrea Schiavone	1543	Kunsthistorisches Museum	GG_1986
		133	Jan Popels	8 alta 5 lata	Andrea Schiavone / Andrea Schiavone	1550	Gemäldegalerie Alte Meister	Gal.-Nr. 274
		134	Quirijn Boel	6 alta 4 lata	Andrea Schiavone / Andrea Schiavone	1560	Kunsthistorisches Museum	GG_47
		135	Quirijn Boel	4 alta 7 lata	Andrea Schiavone / Andrea Schiavone	1555	Kunsthistorisches Museum	GG_5818
		136	Quirijn Boel	4 alta 6 lata	Andrea Schiavone / Andrea Schiavone	1560	Kunsthistorisches Museum	GG_1568
		137	Quirijn Boel	3 alta 6 lata	Andrea Schiavone / Andrea Schiavone	1555	Kunsthistorisches Museum	GG_5816
		138	Quirijn Boel	3 alta 6 lata	Andrea Schiavone / Andrea Schiavone	1558	Kunsthistorisches Museum	GG_1558
		139	Jan van Troyen	4 alta 6 lata	Andrea Schiavone / Andrea Schiavone	1558	Kunsthistorisches Museum	GG_1516
		140	Peter van Lisebetten	6 alta 8 lata	Andrea Schiavone / Andrea Schiavone	1552	Kunsthistorisches Museum	GG_325
		141	Jan van Troyen	7 alta 10 lata	Jusepe de Ribera / Jusepe de Ribera	1630	Kunsthistorisches Museum	GG_326
		142	Lucas Vorsterman	7 alta 5 lata	Jusepe de Ribera / Jusepe de Ribera	1630s	Kunsthistorisches Museum	GG_345
		143	Nikolaus van Hoy	3 1/2 alta 4 1/2 lata	unknown / Bassano			
		144	Lucas Vorsterman	6 alta 5 lata	unknown / Bassano			
		145	Lucas Vorsterman	7 alta 5 lata	Leandro Bassano / Bassano	1590	Kunsthistorisches Museum	GG_43
		146	Lucas Vorsterman	7 alta 5 lata	Leandro Bassano / Bassano	1590	Kunsthistorisches Museum	GG_42
		147	Theodor van Kessel	9 alta 6 lata	unknown / Bassano Jr.			
		148	Jan van Troyen	3 alta 5 lata	David Teniers the Younger / Jacopo Bassano	1656	The Wallace Collection	P635
		149	Jan van Troyen	4 alta 3 lata	Leandro Bassano / Jacopo Bassano	1605	Kunsthistorisches Museum	GG_20
		150	Jan van Troyen	4 alta 3 lata	Francesco Bassano the Younger / Francesco Bassano	1583	Kunsthistorisches Museum	GG_8
		151	Quirijn Boel	3 alta 5 lata	David Teniers the Younger / Jacopo Bassano	1650s	Metropolitan Museum of Art	89.15.22
		152	Quirijn Boel	4 alta 6 lata	Francesco Bassano the Younger / Jacopo Bassano	1575	Kunsthistorisches Museum	GG_12
		153	Theodor van Kessel	6 alta 8 lata	Jacopo Bassano / Bassano Jr.	1555	Kunsthistorisches Museum	GG_361
		154	Quirijn Boel	8 alta 11 lata	Leandro Bassano / Bassano Jr.	1600	National Gallery	NG60
		155	Nikolaus van Hoy and Jan van Ossenbeeck	4 1/2 alta 6 1/2 lata	Francesco Bassano the Younger / Bassano		private collection	
		156	Theodor van Kessel	3 alta 5 lata	Girolamo da Ponte / Jacopo Bassano	1592	Kunsthistorisches Museum	GG_1869
		157	Nikolaus van Hoy and Jan van Ossenbeeck	6 1/2 alta 4 1/2 lata	Francesco Bassano the Younger / Bassano		Kunsthistorisches Museum	GG_4303
		158	Nikolaus van Hoy and Jan van Ossenbeeck	6 1/2 alta 4 1/2 lata	Francesco Bassano the Younger / Bassano		Kunsthistorisches Museum	GG_4304
		159	Nikolaus van Hoy and Jan van Ossenbeeck	4 1/2 alta 6 1/2 lata	Francesco Bassano the Younger / Bassano	1575	Kunsthistorisches Museum	GG_4302
		160	Nikolaus van Hoy	6 alta 5 lata	unknown / Bassano			
		161	Theodor van Kessel	4 alta 6 lata	Francesco Bassano the Younger / Bassano		Kunsthistorisches Museum	GG_1581
		162	Jan van Troyen	8 alta 12 lata	Francesco Bassano the Younger / Jacopo Bassano	1590	Kunsthistorisches Museum	GG_4289
		163	Jan van Troyen	8 alta 12 lata	David Teniers the Younger / Bassano	1656	private collection	
		164	Jan van Troyen	8 alta 12 lata	David Teniers the Younger / Jacopo Bassano	1660	private collection	
		165	Jan van Troyen	8 alta 12 lata	David Teniers the Younger / Bassano	1656	private collection	
		166	Quirijn Boel	10 alta 16 lata	unknown / Cariani			
		167	Jan Popels	5 alta 3 lata	Palma Vecchio / Palma il Vecchio	1527	Kunsthistorisches Museum	GG_2655
		168	Jan Popels	5 alta 3 lata	Palma Vecchio / Palma il Vecchio		Kunsthistorisches Museum	GG_35
		169	Jan Popels	5 alta 3 lata	Palma Vecchio / Palma il Vecchio	1527	Kunsthistorisches Museum	GG_2654
		170	Quirijn Boel	5 alta 4 lata	unknown / Palma il Vecchio		Kunsthistorisches Museum	GG_2604
		171	Theodor van Kessel	3 alta 2 lata	David Teniers the Younger / Palma il Giovane	1656	Courtauld Gallery	P.1978.PG.440
		172	Jan van Troyen	5 alta 3 lata	unknown / Palma il Giovane			
		173	Peter van Lisebetten	3 alta 2 lata	David Teniers the Younger / Palma il Giovane	1655	Philadelphia Museum of Art	Cat. 693
		174	Remoldus Eynhoudt	8 alta 5 lata	Titian / Palma il Vecchio	1560s	Uffizi	10093
		175	Jan van Troyen	5 alta 4 lata	David Teniers the Younger / Palma il Giovane	1655	Philadelphia Museum of Art	Cat. 697
		176	Jan van Troyen	8 alta 6 lata	David Teniers the Younger / Palma il Giovane	1656	Harewood House	
		177	Peter van Lisebetten	3 alta 2 lata	unknown / Palma il Giovane			
		178	Peter van Lisebetten	6 alta 8 lata	Palma il Giovane / Palma il Giovane	1603	Kunsthistorisches Museum	GG_1576
		179	Jan Popels	6 alta 5 lata	Palma il Giovane / Palma il Giovane	1612	Kunsthistorisches Museum	GG_9394
		180	Jan van Troyen	7 alta 5 lata	unknown / Palma il Giovane			
		181	Lucas Vorsterman	7 alta 6 lata	unknown / Palma il Giovane			
		182	Lucas Vorsterman	7 alta 6 lata	unknown / Palma il Giovane			
		183	Jan van Troyen	4 alta 3 lata	unknown / Palma il Giovane			
		184	Lucas Vorsterman	7 alta 5 lata	unknown / Palma il Vecchio			
		185	Jan van Troyen	5 alta 4 lata	Giovanni Cariani / Palma il Vecchio	1515	Museum of Fine Arts, Budapest	84
		186	Jan van Troyen	7 alta 6 lata	Palma il Giovane / Palma il Giovane	1599	Kunsthistorisches Museum	GG_39
		187	Jan van Troyen	6 alta 5 lata	unknown / Palma il Giovane			
		188	Quirijn Boel	8 alta 5 lata	unknown / Palma il Vecchio			
		189	Nikolaus van Hoy and Jan van Ossenbeeck	13 alta 14 1/2 lata	unknown / Palma il Vecchio			
		190	Jan van Troyen	4 alta 3 lata	David Teniers the Younger / Palma il Vecchio	1656	private collection	
		191	Lucas Vorsterman	5 alta 3 lata	Giorgione / Palma il Vecchio	1502	Kunsthistorisches Museum	GG_10
		192	Lucas Vorsterman	4 alta 3 lata	unknown / Palma il Vecchio			
		193	Lucas Vorsterman	4 alta 3 lata	unknown / Palma il Vecchio			
		194	Lucas Vorsterman	4 alta 3 lata	Titian / Palma il Vecchio	1515s	Kunsthistorisches Museum	GG_65
		195	Lucas Vorsterman	4 alta 3 lata	Palma Vecchio / Palma il Vecchio	1513	Kunsthistorisches Museum	GG_83
		196	Lucas Vorsterman	4 alta 5 lata	Palma Vecchio / Palma il Vecchio	1513	Kunsthistorisches Museum	GG_66
		197	Jan van Troyen	5 alta 4 lata	David Teniers the Younger / Palma il Giovane	1655	Philadelphia Museum of Art	Cat. 694
		198	Remoldus Eynhoudt	3 alta 4 lata	Palma il Giovane / Palma il Giovane	1610s	Kunsthistorisches Museum	GG_1546
		199	Jan Popels	3 alta 5 lata	unknown / Palma il Giovane			
		200	Peter van Lisebetten	4 alta 6 lata	David Teniers the Younger / Palma il Giovane	1656	private collection	
		201	Theodor van Kessel	4 alta 6 lata	unknown / Palma il Giovane			
		202	Peter van Lisebetten	8 alta 6 lata	David Teniers the Younger / Palma il Giovane	1658	private collection	
		203	Peter van Lisebetten	12 alta 8 lata	unknown / Palma il Vecchio			
		204	Peter van Lisebetten	6 alta 9 lata	unknown / Palma il Giovane	1600s	Kunsthistorisches Museum	GG_2
		205	Jan van Troyen	6 alta 7 lata	Palma Vecchio / Palma il Vecchio	1520	Uffizi	950
		206	Peter van Lisebetten	8 alta 12 lata	Palma Vecchio / Palma il Vecchio	1522	Kunsthistorisches Museum	GG_60
		207	Quirijn Boel	6 alta 9 lata	Palma Vecchio / Palma il Vecchio	1527	Kunsthistorisches Museum	GG_6803
		208	Peter van Lisebetten	20 alta 10 lata	Palma Vecchio / Palma il Vecchio	1522	Kunsthistorisches Museum	GG_56
		209	Peter van Lisebetten	6 alta 4 lata	unknown / Paris Bordone			
		210	Theodor van Kessel	4 alta 7 lata	Paris Bordone / Paris Bordone	1560s	private collection	
		211	Peter van Lisebetten	5 alta 7 lata	Paris Bordone / Paris Bordone	1545s	National Museum in Warsaw	M.Ob.628
		212	Peter van Lisebetten	5 alta 6 lata	Paris Bordone / Paris Bordone	1560	Kunsthistorisches Museum	GG_17
		213	Nikolaus van Hoy and Jan van Ossenbeeck	4 alta 5 lata	Domenico Fetti / Domenico Fetti	1623	Kunsthistorisches Museum	GG_155
		214	Quirijn Boel	3 alta 4 lata	David Teniers the Younger / Domenico Fetti	1656	Courtauld Gallery	P.1978.PG.434
		215	Quirijn Boel	3 alta 4 lata	Domenico Fetti / Domenico Fetti	1620s	Staatliche Kunstsammlungen Dresden	422
		216	Quirijn Boel	2 alta 4 lata	David Teniers the Younger / Domenico Fetti	1656	private collection	
		217	Theodor van Kessel	3 alta 5 lata	Domenico Fetti / Domenico Fetti	1622	Kunsthistorisches Museum	GG_160
		218	Nikolaus van Hoy	4 1/2 alta 9 lata	unknown / Domenico Fetti			
		219	Quirijn Boel	3 alta 5 lata	Domenico Fetti / Domenico Fetti		Kunsthistorisches Museum	GG_7722
		220	Quirijn Boel	3 alta 5 lata	Domenico Fetti / Domenico Fetti	1622	Kunsthistorisches Museum	GG_172
		221	Quirijn Boel	5 alta 3 lata	unknown / Domenico Fetti	1620s	Kunsthistorisches Museum	GG_1614
		222	Peter van Lisebetten	14 alta 8 lata	Domenico Fetti / Domenico Fetti	1520	Kunsthistorisches Museum	GG_167
		223	Lucas Vorsterman	6 alta 5 lata	Pietro della Vecchia / Pietro della Vecchia		Kunsthistorisches Museum	GG_70
		224	Lucas Vorsterman	6 alta 5 lata	Paris Bordone / Pietro della Vecchia	1530s	Hermitage Museum	ГЭ-70
		225	Lucas Vorsterman	4 alta 3 lata	Guido Reni / Guido Reni	1620	Kunsthistorisches Museum	GG_244
		226	Lucas Vorsterman	4 alta 3 lata	Guido Reni / Guido Reni	1637	Kunsthistorisches Museum	GG_243
		227	Theodor van Kessel	4 alta 5 lata	David Teniers the Younger / Guido Reni	1656	private collection	
		228	Nikolaus van Hoy and Franciscus van der Steen	6 1/2 alta 5 1/2 lata	Fra Bartolomeo / El frate	1516	Kunsthistorisches Museum	GG_195
		229	Lucas Vorsterman	4 alta 3 lata	unknown / Bronzino			
		230	Jan van Troyen	5 alta 4 lata	Giovanni Battista Moroni / Jan van Kalker	1563	Kunsthistorisches Museum	GG_88
		231	Nikolaus van Hoy and Franciscus van der Steen	4 1/2 alta 4 lata	Guido Reni / Guido Reni	1637	Kunsthistorisches Museum	GG_245
		232	Quirijn Boel	4 alta 5 lata	Dosso Dossi / D Ferrara	1620s	Kunsthistorisches Museum	GG_263
		233	Peter van Lisebetten	6 alta 9 lata	Guido Reni / Guido Reni	1625	National Gallery	NG196
		234	Peter van Lisebetten	7 alta 10 lata	Bartolomeo Manfredi / Bartolomeo Manfredi	1615	National Museum of Western Art	
		235	Nikolaus van Hoy and Franciscus van der Steen	7 alta 10 lata	Bartolomeo Manfredi / Bartolomeo Manfredi	1615	Uffizi	6609
		236	Jan van Troyen	8 alta 10 lata	Giovanni Baglione / Giovanni Baglione	1603	private collection	
		237	Nikolaus van Hoy and Franciscus van der Steen	7 1/2 alta 13 lata	Alessandro Varotari / Alessandro Varotari (Padovanino)	1630s	Kunsthistorisches Museum	GG_75
		238	Jan van Troyen	5 alta 4 lata	David Teniers the Younger / Alessandro Varotari (Padovanino)	1656	Courtauld Gallery	P.1978.PG.442
		239	Jan van Troyen	5 alta 3 lata	unknown / Alessandro Varotari			
		240	Peter van Lisebetten	10 alta 6 lata	Valentin de Boulogne / Valentin de Boulogne	1628	Kunsthistorisches Museum	GG_163
		241	Jan van Troyen	10 alta 7 lata	Francisco Lupicini / Francesco Lupicini	1630	Kunsthistorisches Museum	GG_364
		242	Lucas Vorsterman	5 alta 4 lata	Vincenzo Catena / Vincenzo Catena	1520	Kunsthistorisches Museum	GG_87
		243	Jan van Troyen	7 alta 6 lata	David Teniers the Younger / Lorenzo Lotto	1653s	Department of Paintings of the Louvre	MI 1004
		244	Jan van Troyen	4 alta 7 lata	Girolamo Savoldo / Lorenzo Lotto	1520	Kunsthistorisches Museum	GG_1619
		245	Nikolaus van Hoy		Daviid Teniers II / David Teniers II			
		246	Lucas Vorsterman		Pieter Thijs / Pieter Thys	1659	Schleißheim State Gallery	1850
