= Dominicus Claessens =

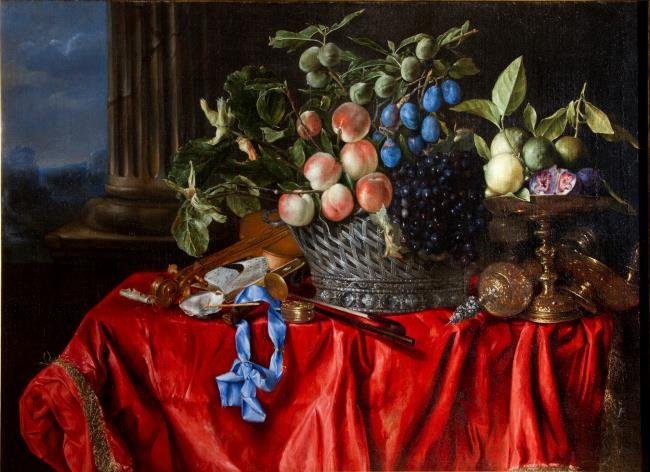
Still life of fruit and musical instruments on a draped table

Dominicus Claessens (c. 1635 – c. 1690) was a Flemish still life painter and engraver.

== Life ==
Very little is known about Claessens' life. He was likely born in Antwerp around 1631 as on 4 July 1674 he declared (as a witness) to be 'ontrent 43 jaeren' (around 42 years old). He became a master in the Guild of Saint Luke of Antwerp in 1660–1661.

== Work ==
He was active as a still life painter and reproductive printmaker. He made engravings for David Teniers the Younger's Theatrum pictorium, a catalog of 243 Italian paintings in the Archduke Leopold Wilhelm of Austria's collection of over 1300 paintings kept at his residence in Brussels. One of these engravings depicting a Virgin and Child accompanied by St John and an Angel after a painting by Giulio Cesare Procaccini was included by Joseph Strutt in his 1786 dictionary of engravers. Strutt was critical about Claessens' inaccurate execution of the print.

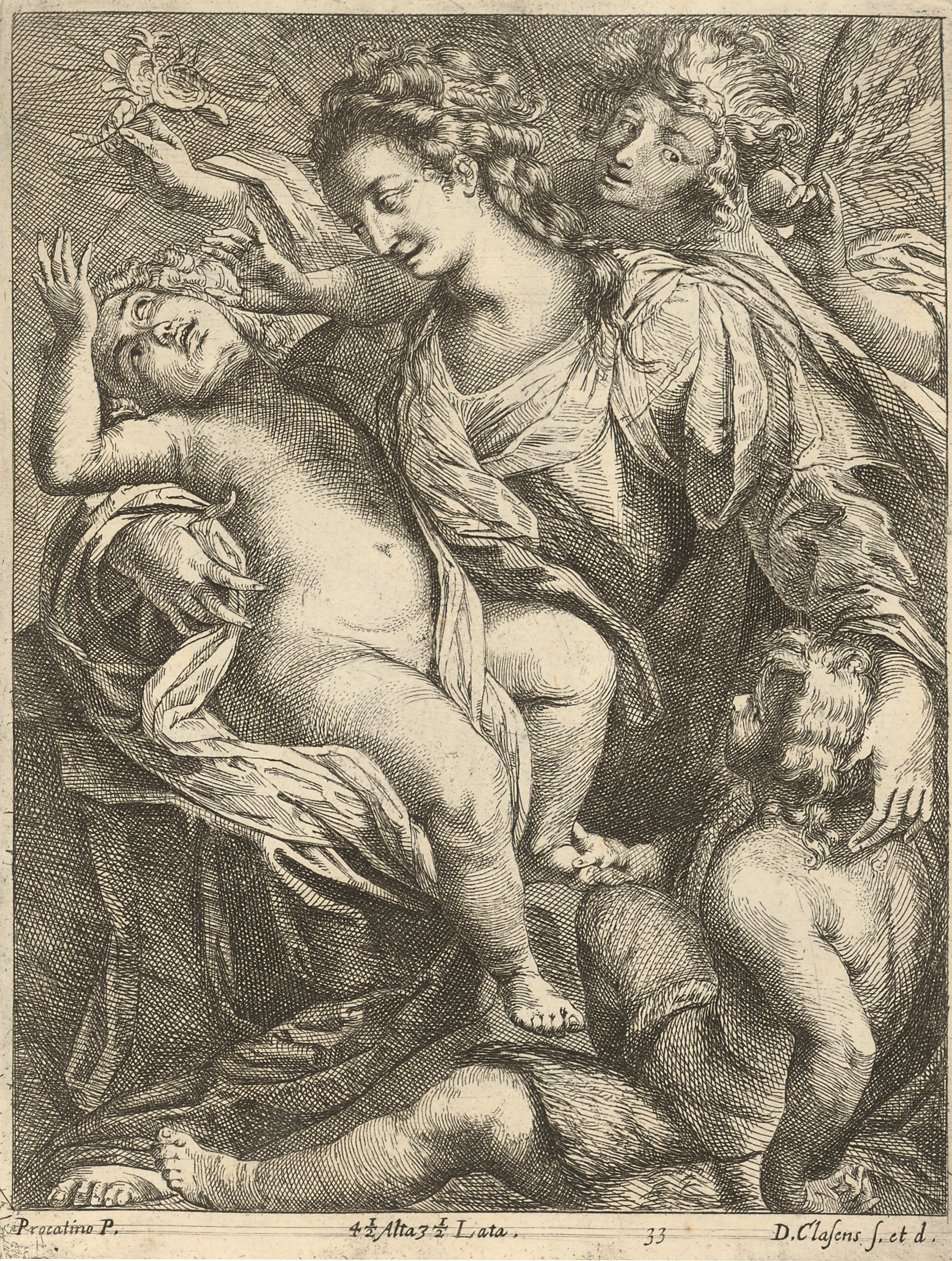
Virgin and Child accompanied by St John and an Angel, engraving after Giulio Cesare Procaccini

Guild membership granted him the right to sign and date his paintings. A Still life of fruit and musical instruments on a draped table is signed and dated 1665.
