= Franciscus van der Steen =

Flemish painter

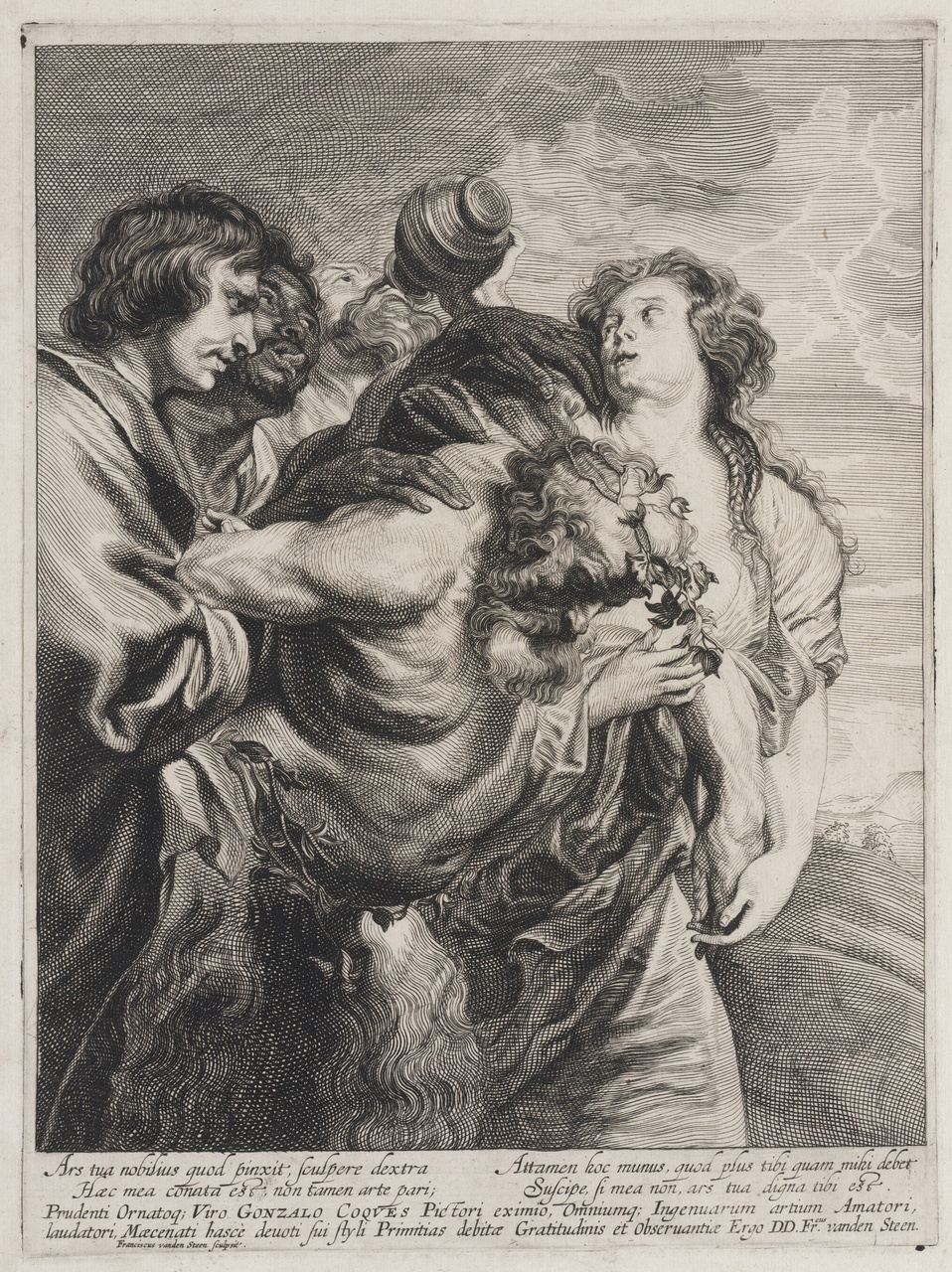
Drunken Silenus, after van Dyck

Franciscus van der Steen (Antwerp, c. 1625 – Vienna, 1672) was a Flemish painter and engraver who was active in Vienna. He is now mainly known for his reproductive prints after master paintings and various publications containing portraits of prominent persons. No known paintings are currently attributed to him.

== Life ==
Franciscus van der Steen is believed to have been born in Antwerp somewhere between 1615 and 1635. In the guild year 1638-39 he registered as a pupil of the engraver Alexander Voet the Elder in the registers of the Antwerp Guild of Saint Luke.

He became a master in the Antwerp Guild in the guild year 1643–1644. He is one of the Flemish and Dutch artists, such as Nikolaus van Hoy, Jan Anton van der Baren and Jan van Ossenbeeck, who followed Archduke Leopold Wilhelm, the art loving governor of the Southern Netherlands, upon his return to Vienna in 1656.

Shortly after his arrival in Vienna in 1656, van der Steen asked the court chancellery for court quarters (i.e. accommodation) and in the same year he was appointed court etcher to Emperor Ferdinand III with an annual income of 1200 gulden. This sum was reduced to 800 gulden the following year.

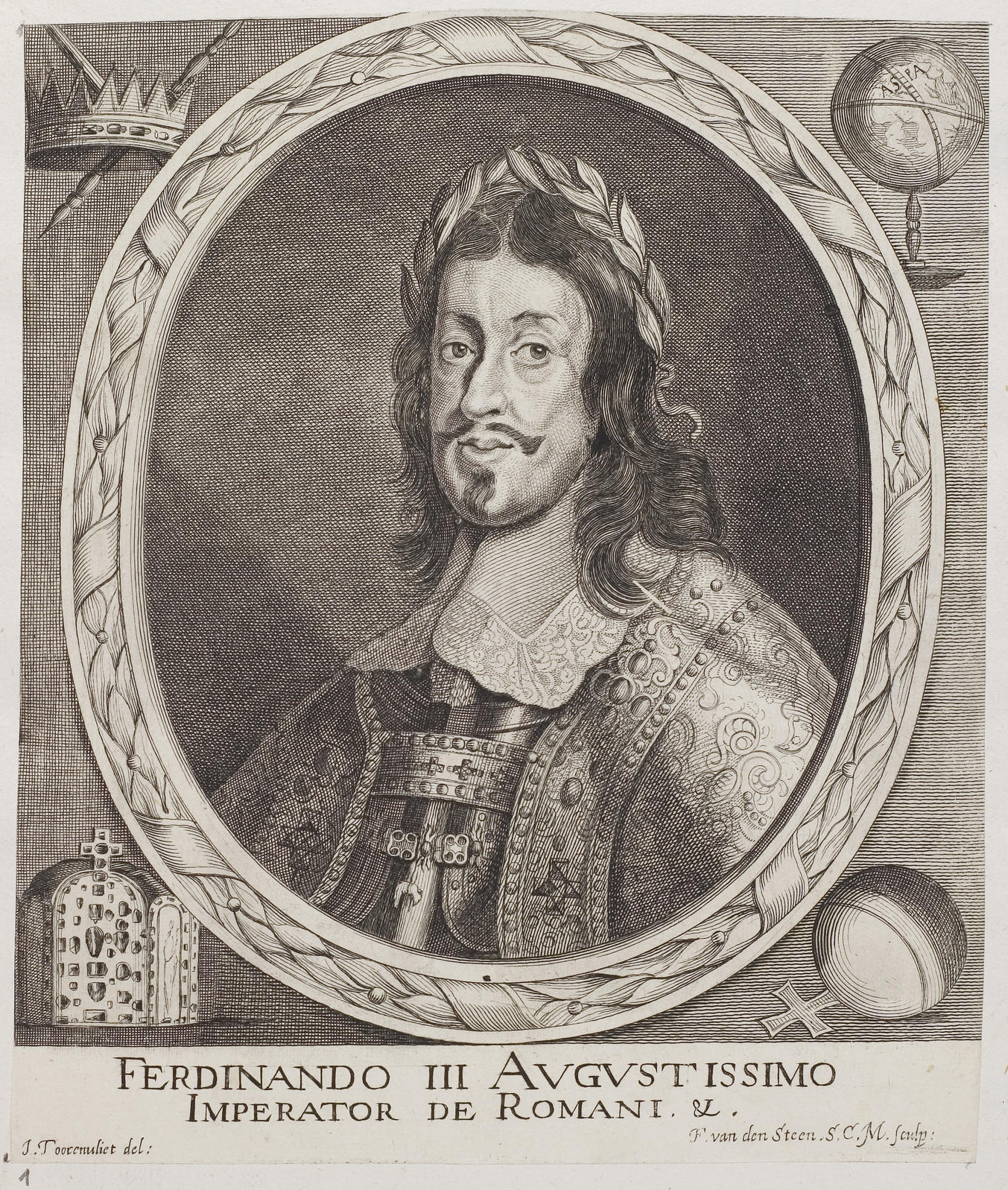
Portrait of Emperor Ferdinand III, after Jacob Toorenvliet

Franciscus van der Steen operated a workshop in Vienna. On 8 January 1662, van der Steen signed his name in the ecclesiastical registers of the Schottenkirche (Scottish church) in Vienna as he, together with the Flemish painter Jan de Herdt, acted as a witnesses at the wedding of the Dutch landscape painter Hans de Jode. Van der Steen and Jan de Herdt later collaborated on a series of aristocratic portraits for the publication Historia di Lepoldo Cesare.

His compatriot, the landscape painter Renier Meganck, joined his workshop around 1670. In 1671 Meganck acted as a witness and sealed the last will of Franciscus van der Steen. Van der Steen died not much later in early 1672.

== Work ==
Franciscus van der Steen is principally known as a reproductive engraver who made engravings after old masters and contemporary artists. The archival sources also show him in the role of a painter. The Liechtenstein books of accounts record that van der Steen was paid 465 gulden for paintings in August 1665, 120 gulden in September of the same year and a further 34 gulden and 30 kreutzer for five more paintings in July 1667. No paintings are currently attributed to van der Steen.

He worked together with Nikolaus van Hoy, Jan van Ossenbeeck and others on engravings for David Teniers the Younger's Theatrum Pictorium. This Theatrum Pictorium is a shortened name of a book published in 1660 in Antwerp by David Teniers the Younger's brother Abraham Teniers in Antwerp. It was a catalog of 243 Italian paintings in the collection of over 1300 pictures owned by Teniers' employer, the Archduke Leopold Wilhelm of Austria. It contained engravings of these paintings engraved after small models (modelli ) that Teniers had painted after the originals. A second edition with page numbers was published in 1673. Nikolaus van Hoy worked as the intermediary draughtsman for several of the prints as he translated the modelli made by Teniers into drawings. These were then engraved by van der Steen and 11 other engravers. The publication ends with an engraving by van der Steen after a drawing by Nicolaus van Hoy of a view of the Stallburg gallery of the Archduke.

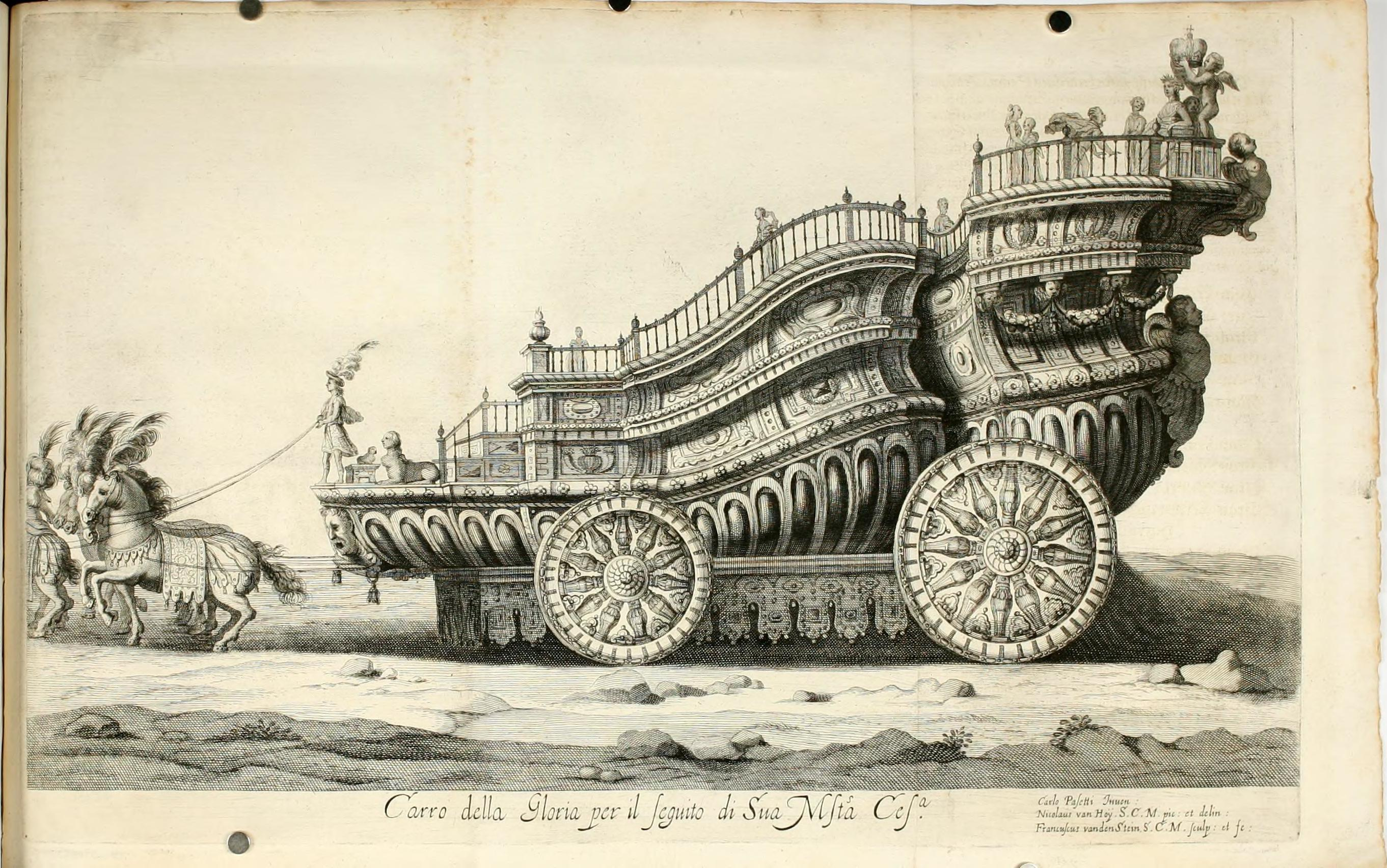
Float from the 'Sieg-Streit Deß Lufft vnd Wassers'

He also worked with the Antwerp publisher and engraver Joannes Meyssens on portrait engravings for Het Gulden Cabinet der Edel Vry Schilderconst, the book of artist biographies written by Cornelis de Bie first published in 1662. He worked again with Nikolaus van Hoy and Jan van Ossenbeeck on a publishing project on the occasion of the wedding of Emperor Leopold I and Margaret Theresa of Spain. It describes the festival, including a horse ballet, that was performed in January 1667, under the direction of Alessandro Carducci, with floats designed by Carlo Pasetti and a text written by Francesco Sbarra. The book was published in 1667 in Vienna under the title Sieg-Streit Deß Lufft vnd Wassers ('Fight between air and water').

He further collaborated with the Meyssen workshop on the publication of Galeazzo Gualdo Priorato's 'Historia di Leopoldo Cesare', published by Flemish publisher Johann Baptist Hacque in Vienna (vols. 1-2, 1670; vol. 3, 1674). The first volume described the political and military successes of Emperor Leopold I between 1656 and 1670. It was illustrated with prints after designs primarily by Netherlandish artists, primarily portraits of European monarchs and important aristocrats, as well as castle scenes, battle scenes, maps and ceremonies. Apart from van der Steen, the Dutch and Flemish artists who contributed to the work were Joannes Meyssen's son Cornelis Meyssens, Frans Geffels, Jan de Herdt, Gerard Bouttats, Adriaen van Bloemen, Jacob Toorenvliet, Leonard Hendrik van Otteren (fl. 1670 - 1713) and Sebastian van Dryweghen (fl 1670 – 1676). German and Italian artists Moritz Lang (fl. c. 1647 - 1670), Johann Martin Lerch (1643 - 1693), Johann Holst (fl. 17th century), Marco Boschini and 'Il Bianchi' also contributed.
