= Gerard Bouttats =

Flemish, draughtsman engraver and printmaker

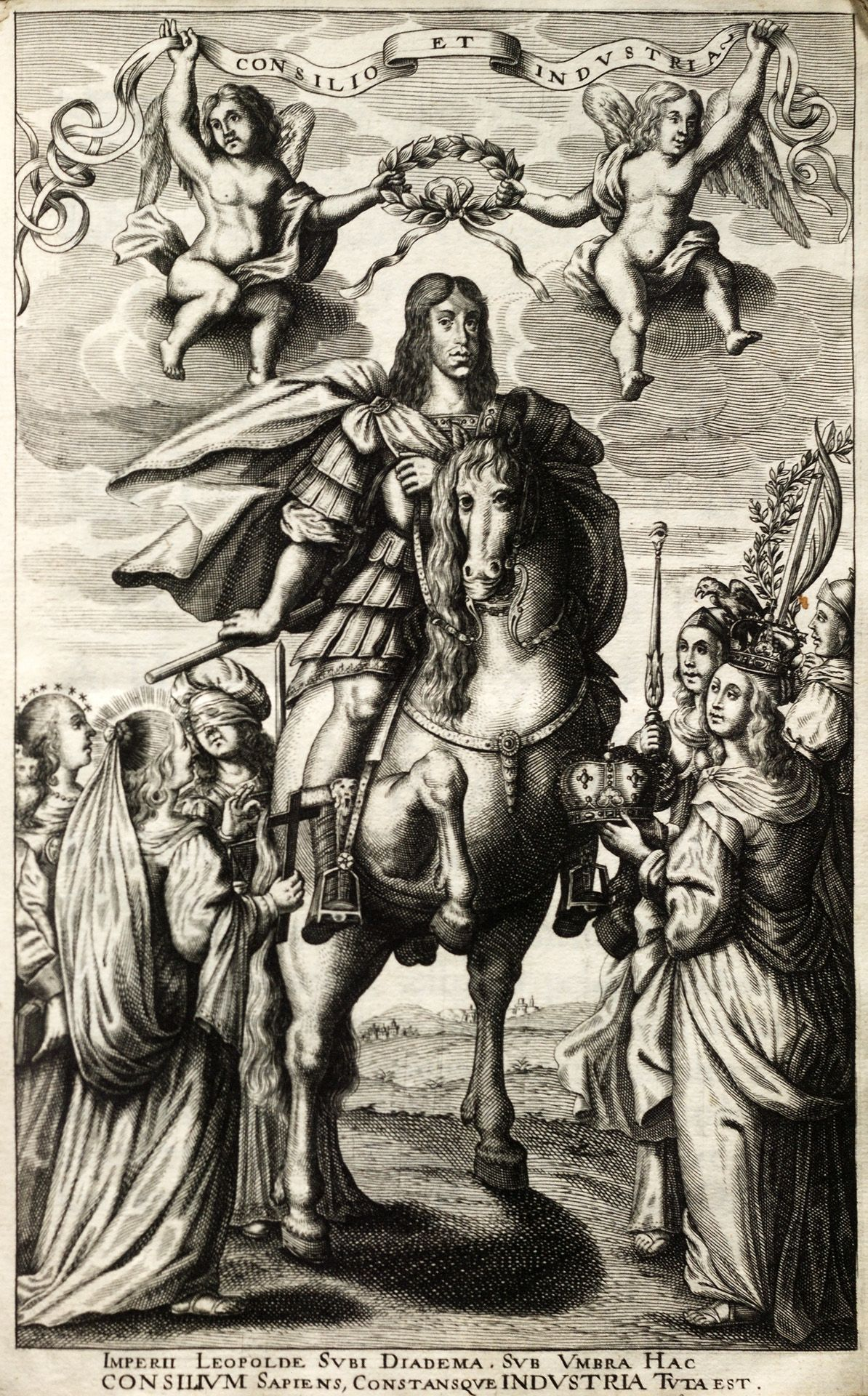
Holy Roman Emperor Leopold I

Gerard Bouttats or Gerhardt Bouttats (Antwerp, circa 1630 – probably Vienna after 1668) was a Flemish, draughtsman engraver and printmaker, known for his prints of portraits, allegories, and devotional works. He trained in his native Antwerp in the workshop of his father. He later worked for a while in Cologne and later moved to Vienna where he worked for the remainder of his short life.

== Life ==
Gerard Bouttats was born in Antwerp around 1630 as the son of the prominent engraver and print publisher Frederik Bouttats the Elder and Maria de Weerdt. He was a half-brother of Frederik the Younger and brother of Gaspar, Jacob and possibly Philibert the Elder who all became printmakers. There is no record of Jacob being registered as a pupil or master at the Antwerp Guild of Saint Luke. This confirms that the first trained and then worked in his father's workshop.

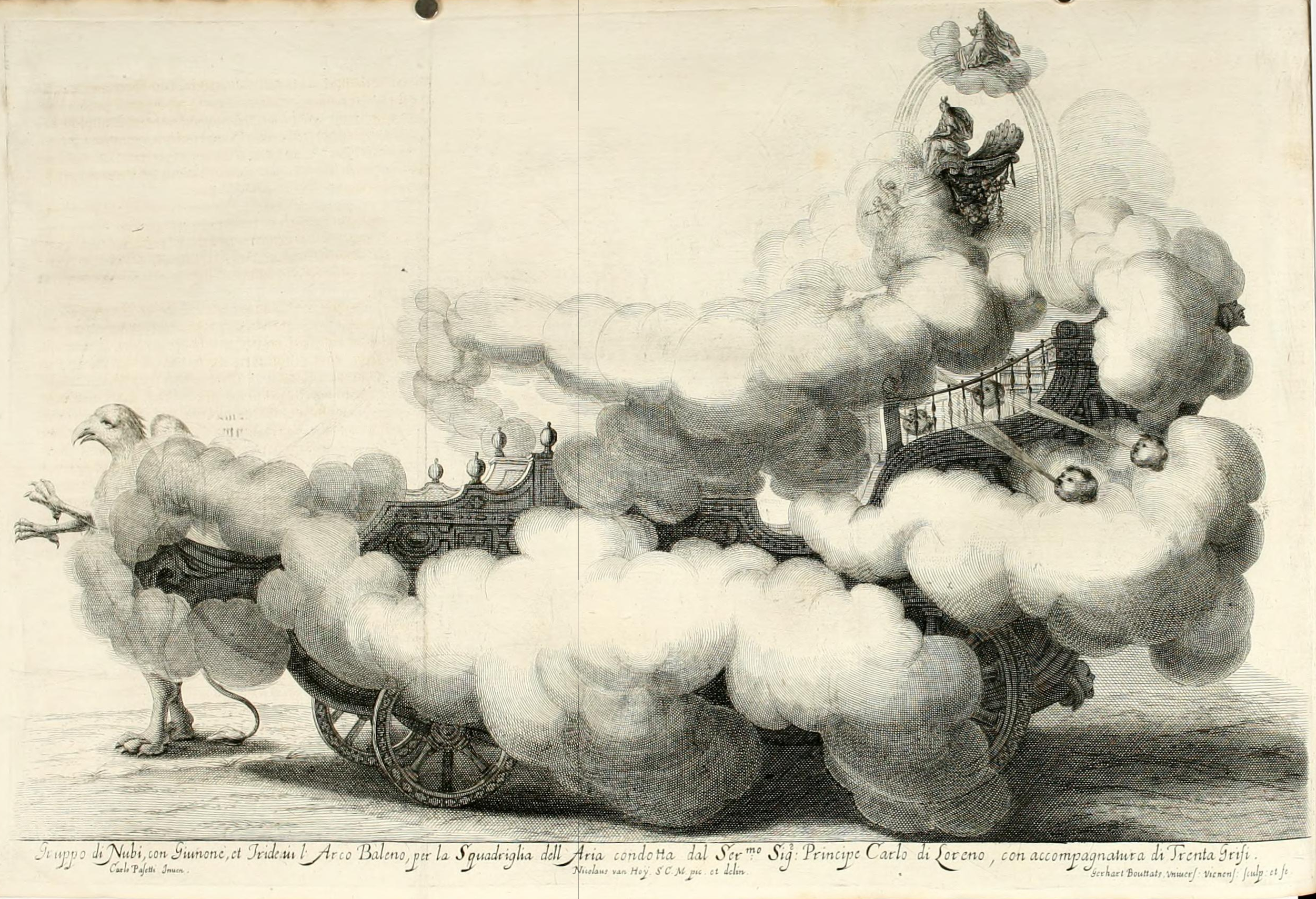
The chariot from the Sieg-Streit dess Lufft vnd Wassers. Freuden-Fest zu Pferd

He left Antwerp and is recorded in Cologne in the period 1650–1651. He is known to have made various portrait engravings of prominent personalities in that city. He also made engravings after the designs of the local artist Johann Toussyn. He is recorded next in Vienna where he was employed as an engraver for the local university. He reportedly engraved portraits of doctors of the university, including one of Adam Munds.

He married Eva Rosina Jenet, widow of the engraver Sebastian Jenet, on 2 May 1655. The couple had four daughters. After his first wife died in 1664, Bouttats married Caecilia Renata Stadler on 18 May 1665. In Vienna he worked on various publication projects often in cooperation with other artists and publishers from Flanders and the Dutch Republic. He also did some work for the imperial court including making an engraved calendar and an engraving representing one of the battles of the war with the Turks of 1663–64.

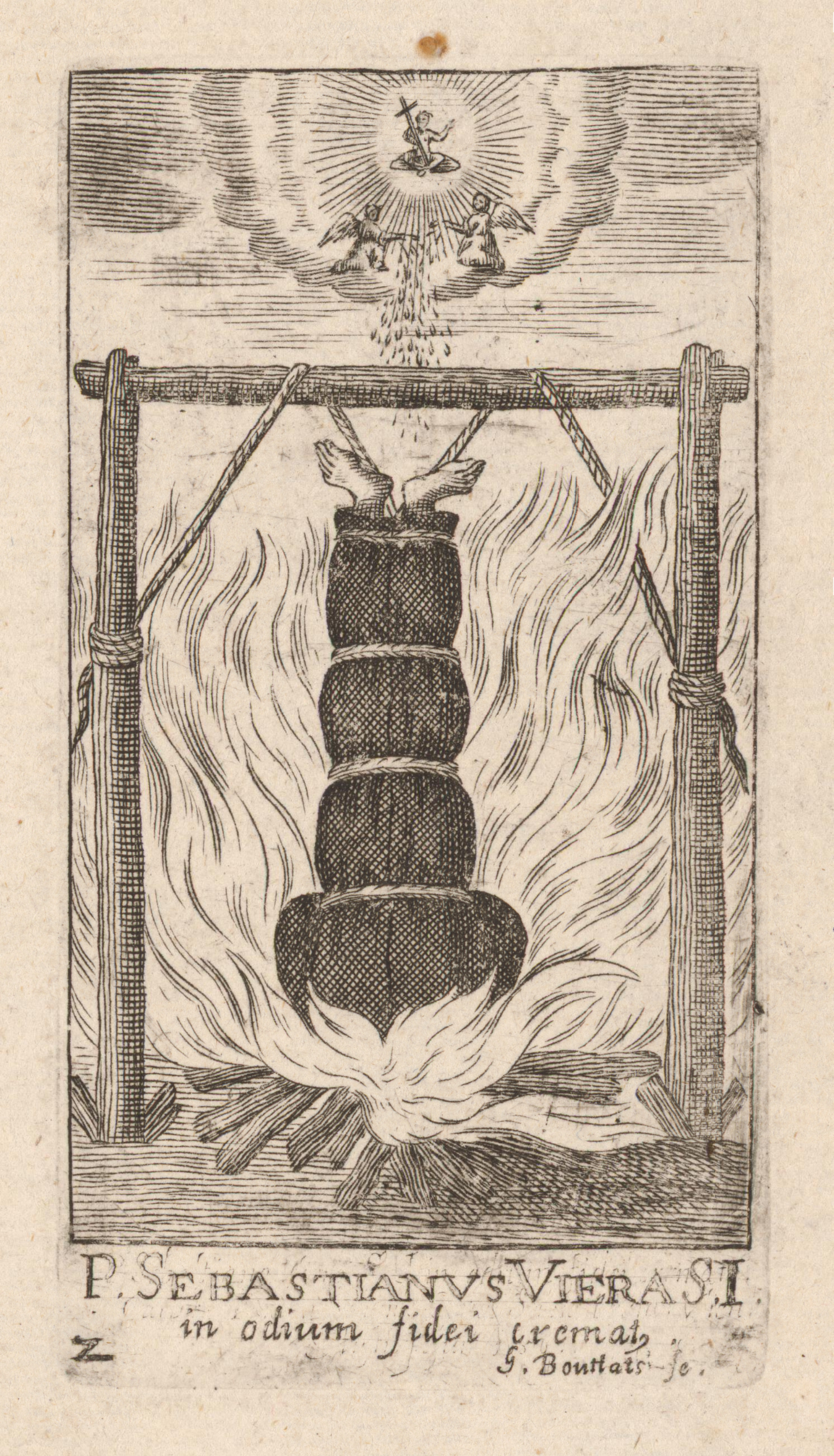
The martyrdom of father Sebastian Vieira in Japan

He was possibly the father of J. Bouttats, an artist who worked in Bohemia around 1700.

The place and time of his death are not recorded but it was likely in Vienna around 1668 as no information regarding Bouttats is recorded after that date.

== Work ==
Bouttats worked as an engraver who produced mainly portraits, and to a lesser extent, allegories, some landscape and battle scenes, calendars and devotional works. Most of his works were made after designs of other masters. There have been some incorrect attributions of words to Gerard of works of his family member Gaspar Boutats who signed some of his works with G. Bouttats.

He was the engraver of the frontispiece and 50 imperial busts included in Nicola Avancini's Imperium Romano-Germanicum, a Carolo Magno Primo Romano-Germanico Caesare, per Quadraginta Novem Imperatores et Germaniae Reges, et ex his per XIV published in Vienna in 1658 (Typis Matthiae Cosmerovii). The book contains panegyrics of 50 German-Roman emperors written by Avancini.

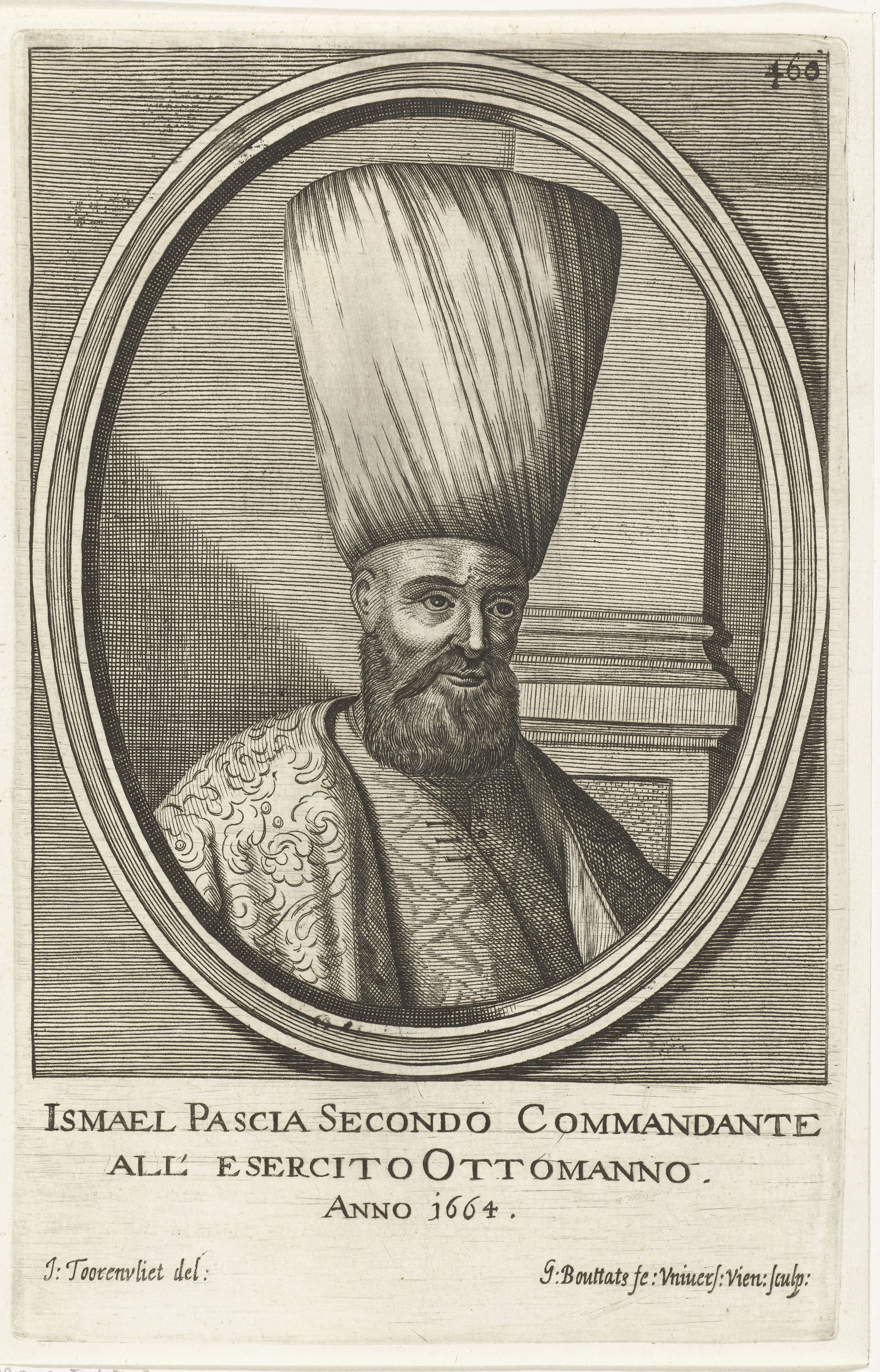
Portrait of Ismael Pasha

He worked with Franciscus van der Steen, Nikolaus van Hoy and Jan van Ossenbeeck on a publishing project on the occasion of the wedding of Emperor Leopold I and Margaret Theresa of Spain. It describes the festive celebrations, including a horse ballet, that were performed in January 1667. Th event was directed by Alessandro Carducci, with floats designed by Carlo Pasetti and a text written by Francesco Sbarra. The book was published in 1667 in Vienna under the title Sieg-Streit Deß Lufft vnd Wassers ('Fight between air and water'). Bouttats designed and engraved some of the prints, including those depicting in detail the floats and a grotto, that were especially created by Carlo Pasetti for the festival.

Bouttats collaborated on the publication of Galeazzo Gualdo Priorato's Historia di Leopoldo Cesare, published by Johann Baptist Hacque in Vienna (vols. 1-2, 1670; vol. 3, 1674). The first volume described the political and military successes of Emperor Leopold I between 1656 and 1670. It was illustrated with prints after designs primarily by Netherlandish artists with portraits of European monarchs and important aristocrats, as well as castle scenes, battle scenes, maps and ceremonies. Bouttats engraved a number of the portraits that were included in this work; other Dutch and Flemish artists who contributed were Frans Geffels, Jan de Herdt, Franciscus van der Steen, Cornelis Meyssens, Adriaen van Bloemen, Jacob Toorenvliet, Leonard Hendrik van Otteren (fl. 1670 - 1713) and Sebastian van Dryweghen (fl. 1670-76). German and Italian artists Moritz Lang (fl. c. 1647 - 1670), Johann Martin Lerch (1643 - 1693), Johann Holst (fl. 17th century), Marco Boschini and 'Il Bianchi' also contributed.

He also created a series of prints representing the martyrdom of Catholic missionaries in the colonies. This includes the print showing the martyrdom of father Sebastian Vieira in Japan.
