= Jan de Herdt =

Flemish painter

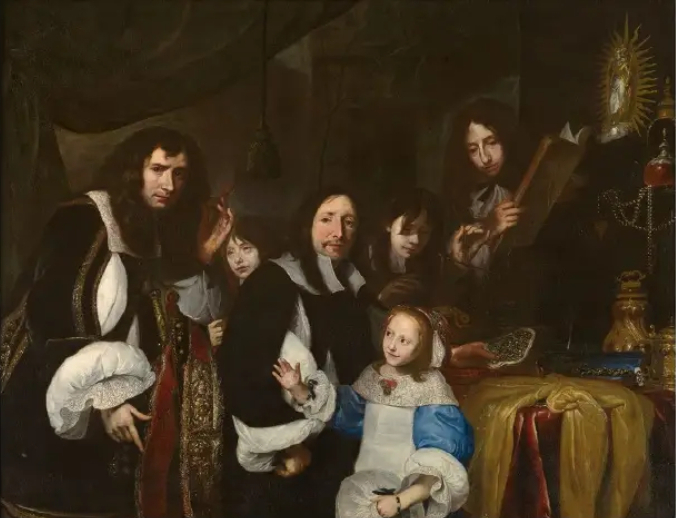
Portrait of the family of Imperial Goldsmith Franz Wilhelm de Harde von Antorff, presumed self-portrait of the artist on the left

Jan de Herdt, in Italy also called Il fiammingo (Antwerp, c. 1620 – between 1686 and 1690) was a Flemish painter and draughtsman. After training in Antwerp, he spent his entire career abroad, first in Northern Italy and later in Vienna and other cities in central Europe. He was mainly a portrait artist but also painted genre scenes as well as religious, mythological and allegorical subjects. He was part of a network of Flemish and Dutch painters working for the court, aristocracy and ecclesiastical institutions of central Europe.

== Life ==
Details about the life of Jan de Herdt are sketchy. He is believed to have been born in Antwerp around 1620. It is not clear who was his master. He is not recorded with any of the contemporary painters as a pupil. It is therefore possible that he studied with Rubens or Jordaens, two artists who as court artists were exempted from the requirement to register their pupils with the Antwerp Guild of Saint Luke. There exists no documentary evidence for such apprenticeship. It is also possible that he was trained outside of Antwerp. He was admitted as a master in the Antwerp Guild of Saint Luke in the guild year 1646–47. On 18 October 1648 he joined the 'Sodaliteit van de Bejaerde Jongmans' (Sodality of the Unmarried Men of Age), a fraternity for bachelors established by the Jesuit order.

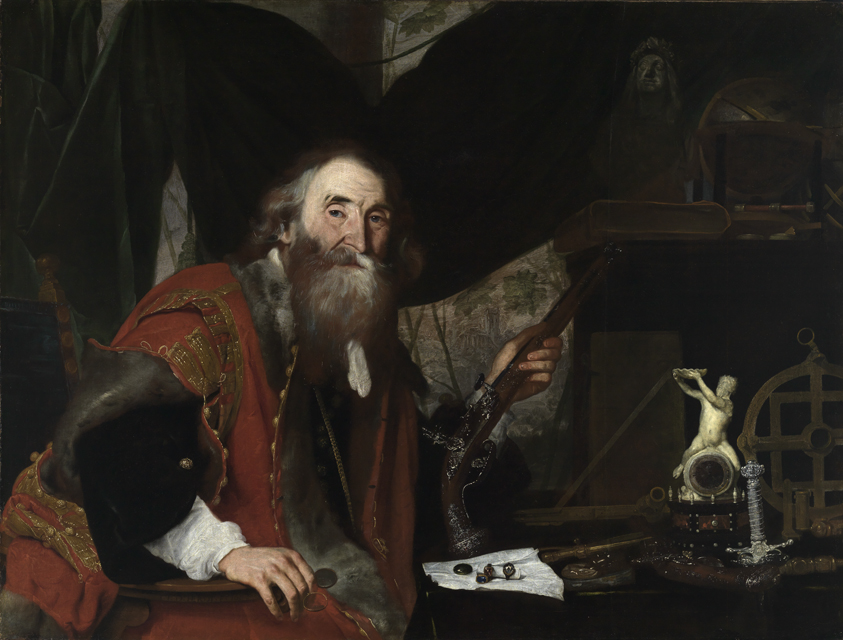
Portrait of an unknown man with his art collection (The antique dealer)

He left Flanders and was subsequently recorded in Northern Italy, where he was documented in Lovere in 1657 as working on an altarpiece for the local church of St George. The large painting depicting Moses striking the rock is still in situ. He was recorded in Bergamo in 1658 where he painted the Abraham and Abimelech for the Santa Maria Maggiore Church, which is still in situ. He is documented in Brescia in 1660–1661. In this location he resided long enough to train the painter Angelo Everardi, who was likely of Flemish descent and was known as il Fiammenghino. Although there is no documentary evidence for this, it is likely that he was also active in Mantua for a while. The artistic direction of the Ducal Court in Mantua had been for decades in the hands of Flemish artists, first Daniel van den Dyck and later Frans Geffels. Geffels was also from Antwerp and had become a member of the Antwerp Guild of Saint Luke a year earlier than de Herdt. He had then left to work in Italy while also working for periods in, and maintaining links, with Vienna, where both artists are believed to have arrived in the early 1660s. It is likely that the artists knew each other as they both contributed to a collaborative book published in Vienna, the Historia di Leopoldo Cesare.

Jan de Herdt followed in the footsteps of many of his compatriots of the previous generation who sought a career in Central Europe. The Southern Netherlands had developed a close bond with the Imperial court in Vienna as its Spanish Habsburg rulers were connected with it through dynastic links. The governors of the Southern Netherlands were often members of the Austrian Imperial family. They occasionally took artists from the Southern Netherlands with them when they returned to Vienna after being called back from their post. This was the case with Archduke Leopold Wilhelm, who brought artists such as Jan Anton van der Baren, Franciscus van der Steen and Nikolaus van Hoy with him to Vienna.

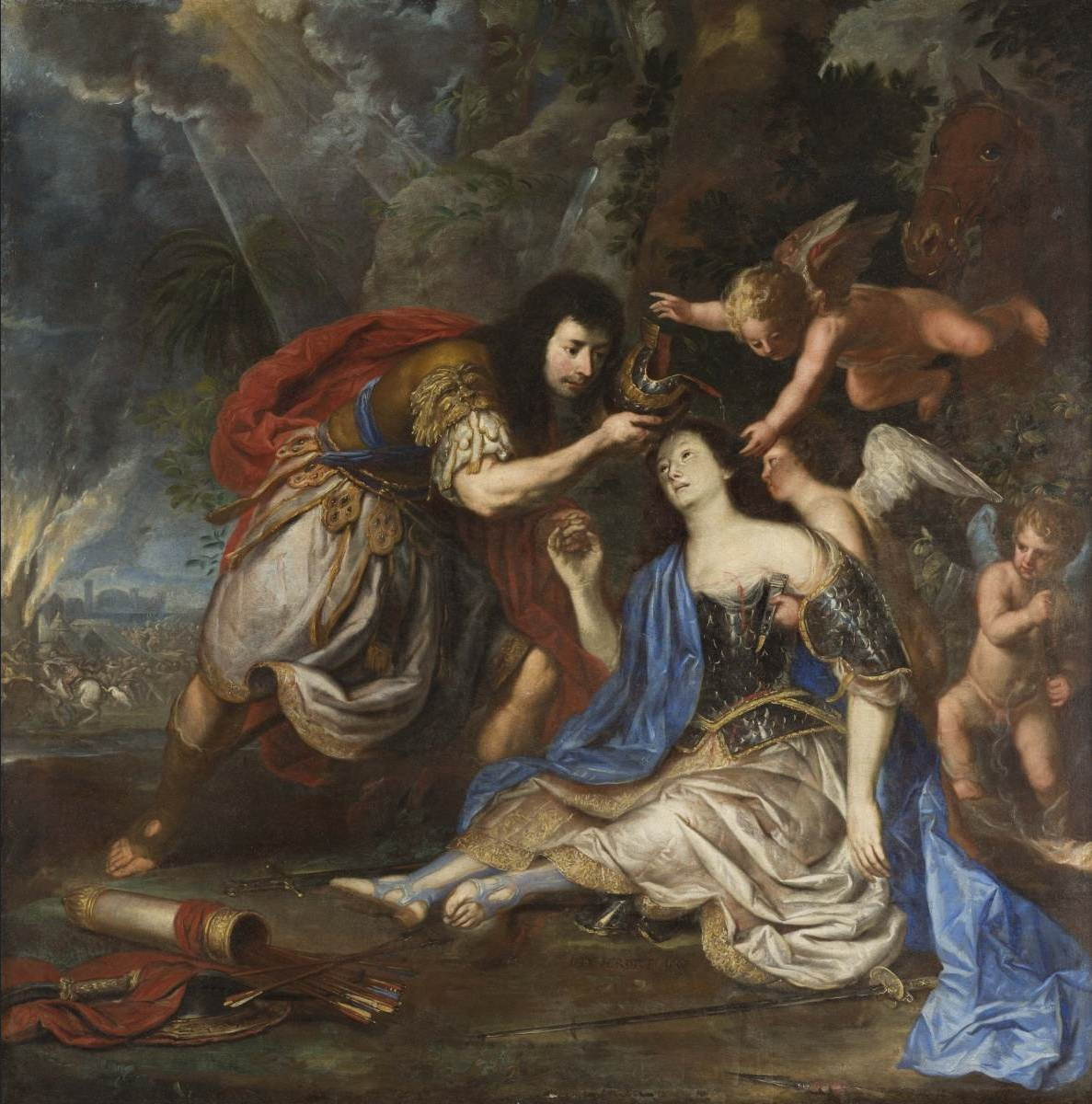
Mortally wounded Clorinda baptized by Tancred

Jan de Herdt's brother had preceded him as he was working in Vienna as a goldsmith to the court and may have been instrumental in introducing Jan to the court in Vienna. While he is believed to have arrived in Vienna around 1660, Jan is first documented in Vienna on 8 January 1662. On that date he signed his name in the ecclesiastical registers of the Schottenkirche (Scottish church) in Vienna as he together with the Flemish engraver Franciscus van der Steen acted as a witnesses at the wedding of the Dutch artist Hans de Jode. Jan de Herdt later collaborated with van der Steen on a series of aristocratic portraits for the publication Historia di Lepoldo Cesare. Frans Geffels also contributed to this publication. In Vienna, de Herdt painted portraits of courtiers as well as history paintings for their chateaux and palaces. He appears in the business records of Forchondt, a family business of art dealers from Antwerp who served clients throughout Europe and had a branch in Vienna. The son of the founder of the family business trained as a goldsmith with Jan's brother in Vienna. The records of the Forchondt firm show that in 1671 Prince Schwarzenberg bought a painting on the subject of Armida and Rinaldo, which was likely the Rinaldo preventing Armida's suicide by de Herdt (now in the former Augustinian monastery in Brno).

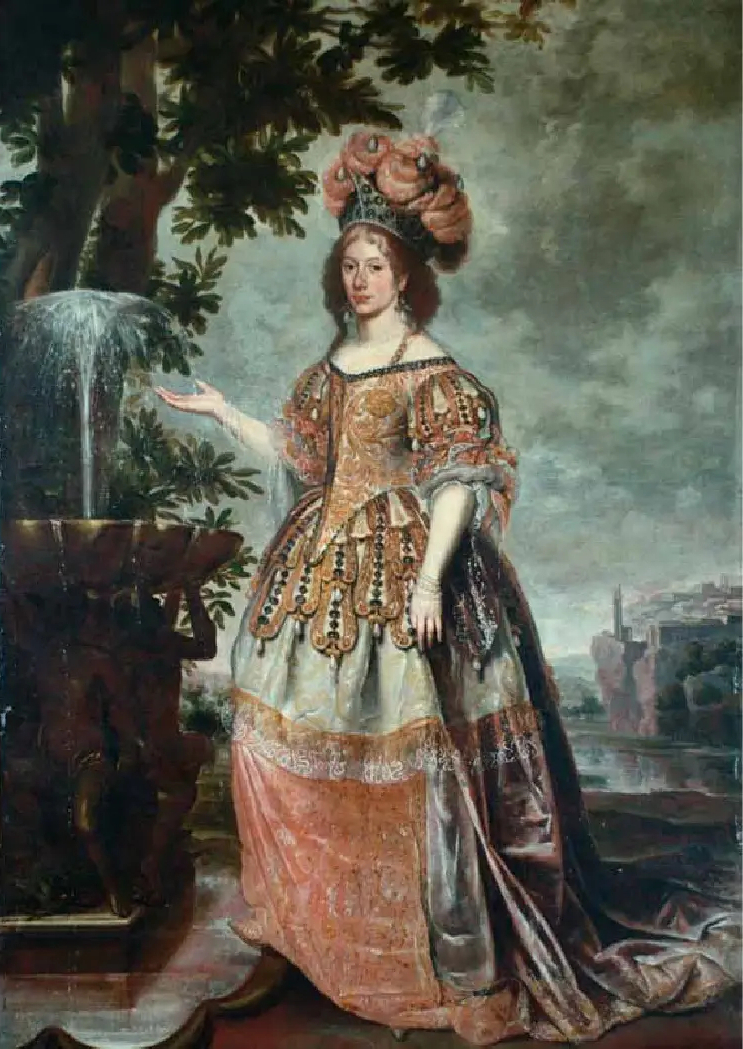
Portrait of unknown noblewoman

Jan may have been active in Jaroměřice nad Rokytnou (now in the Czech Republic) from the beginning of 1666 to January 1667. From 1666 to 1668 de Herdt worked in Brno. He is recorded in Prague in 1680 where he had accompanied the court when it fled Vienna due to an outbreak of the plague. He was in Třebíč from 1880 to 1881 and, in this last year, also in Znojmo. In 1684 he executed two works for patrons in Prague but these were possibly created elsewhere. The last report of his presence in Jaroměřice nad Rokytnou dates back to 1686. After 1686 there is no more news of the artist.

The exact time and place of his death are not known. There are no records about him after 1686. It is believed he died sometime between 1686 and 1690 in Central Europe.

== Work ==
Jan de Herdt was a versatile painter who painted portraits, stories from the bible, history paintings and genre scenes. He signed the vast majority of his works with the most widespread variant of his name J. D. Herdt. The most apparent influences on his work are Antwerp's leading painters Anthony van Dyck, Rubens, Jordaens and Caspar de Crayer. The style of de Herdt's portraits shows the influence of the van Dyckian portrait model. This influence is also recognisable in his series of paintings recounting stories from Torquato Tasso's 'Gerusalemme Liberata' such as the Erminia and the shepherds.

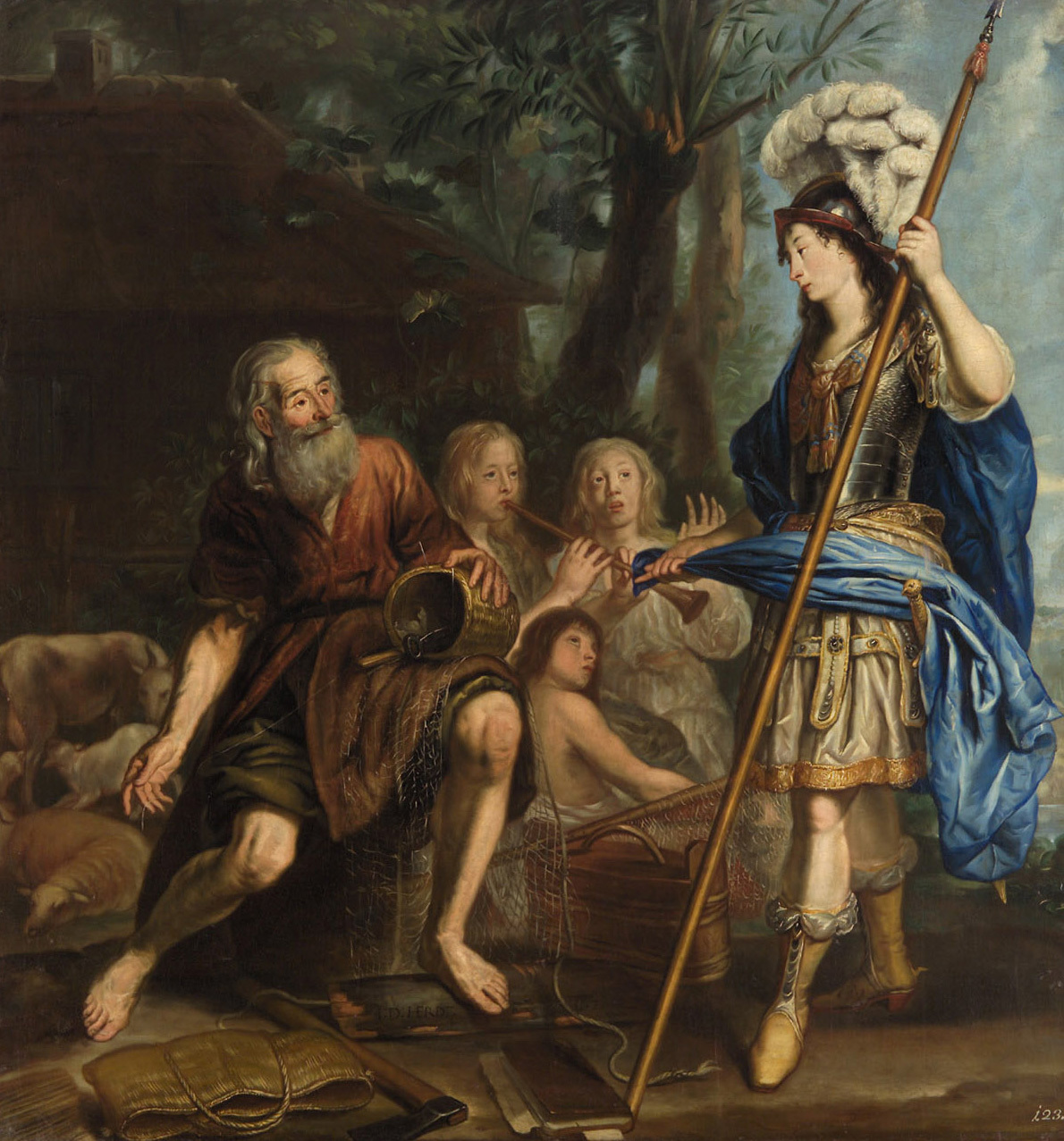
Erminia and the shepherds

Jan de Herdt also was aware of trends in Central European painting. This is shown in his Portrait of the family of Imperial Goldsmith Franz Wilhelm de Harde von Antorff (Royal Museums of Fine Arts of Belgium). De Herdt's family portrait likely includes a self-portrait in the young man on the left who holds a watch in his left hand and points with his right hand to the floor. Alternatively, this may be a portrait of his nephew. Given the similarities between the two works, de Herdt's family portrait may indicate that he had seen the Family of precious stone cutter Dionysius Miseroni (National Gallery Prague) painted by the Czech portrait painter Karel Škréta in 1653. This was one of the first group portraits of this kind in Central Europe. In 1669 Tobias Pock painted a Self-Portrait with the artist's family in which he depicted himself in a manner that is almost identical to the one used by Jan de Herdt in his family portrait. Pock may have known de Herdt's family portrait. Jan de Herdt along with the above-mentioned artists created an entirely new visual language in Central Europe through this type of communicative group portrait.

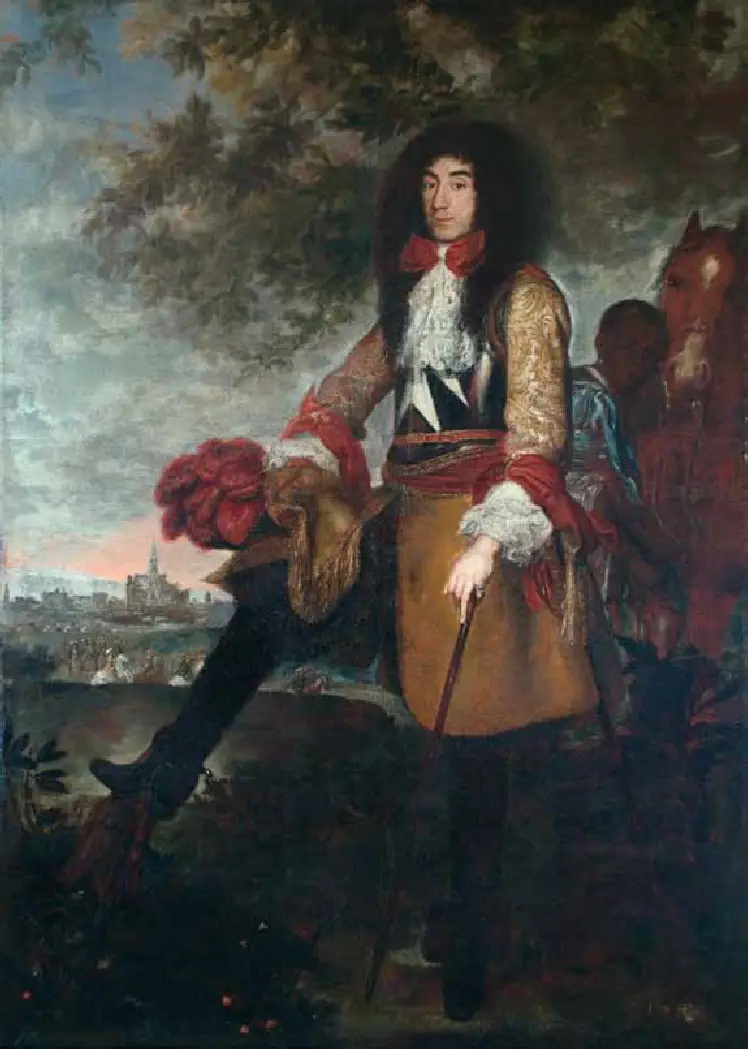
Portrait of Franz Augustin von Waldstein

Jan de Herdt collaborated on the publication of Galeazzo Gualdo Priorato's Historia di Leopoldo Cesare, published by Flemish publisher Johann Baptist Hacque in Vienna (vols. 1-2, 1670; vol. 3, 1674). The first volume described the political and military successes of Emperor Leopold I between 1656 and 1670. It was illustrated with prints after designs primarily by Netherlandish artists with portraits of European monarchs and important aristocrats, as well as castle scenes, battle scenes, maps and ceremonies. Apart from Jan de Herdt, the Dutch and Flemish artists who contributed to the work were Frans Geffels, Cornelis Meyssens, Franciscus van der Steen, Gerard Bouttats, Adriaen van Bloemen, Jacob Toorenvliet, Leonard Hendrik van Otteren (fl. 1670 - 1713) and Sebastian van Dryweghen (fl. 1670 - 1676). German and Italian artists Moritz Lang (fl. c. 1647 - 1670), Johann Martin Lerch (1643 - 1693), Johann Holst (fl. 17th century), Marco Boschini and 'Il Bianchi' also contributed. Jan de Herdt contributed at least six designs for portraits: Jerzy Sebastian Lubomirski, Duke Ferdinand Dietrichstein, Count Jean-Louis Raduit de Souches, Count Raimund Montecuccoli, Count Jan Rottal and Count Nicholas Zrinsky. The prints designed by de Herdt in this publication have been used as the basis for attributing paintings to de Herdt. For instance, the Portrait of the Polish nobleman and commander Jerzy Sebastian Lubomirski (Royal Castle, Warsaw) was attributed in this manner. De Herdt is also the author of a series of portraits of members of the Waldstein family.

The works de Herdt created in Italy are all found in Lombardy. In 1920 the artist's signature was discovered on the altarpiece of the high altar of the Church of Saint Maurice in Breno in Lombardy, northern Italy. The altarpiece depicts Saint Maurice kneeling before the Virgin and Child. There was a Portrait of St. Elizabeth (now lost) in the Church of St. Francis of Assisi in Brescia. There is an altarpiece depicting the Virgin in the clouds with Saints Anthony of Padua and Valentine, signed J. De Herdt F. in situ at the Church of San Giovanni Decollato in Desenzano del Garda. Another painting by de Herdt in Lombardy is an altarpiece of Moses striking the rock preserved in the Church of Saint Georges in Lovere. This work is remarkable for its large size (785 cm high and 500 cm wide) and the movement of the large crowd depicted in it.
