= Adriaen van Bloemen =

Flemish painter, print designer, and engraver

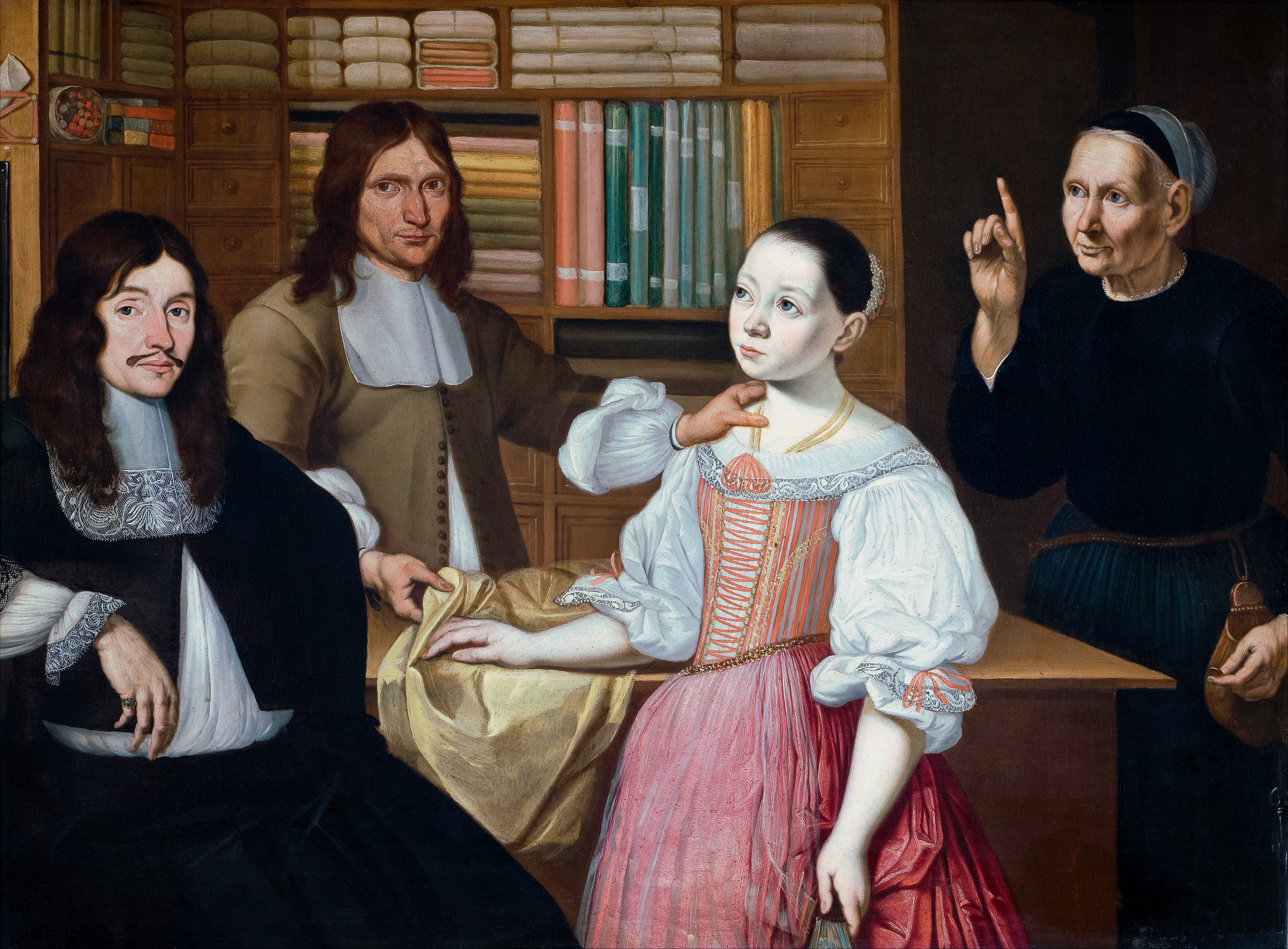
In the draper's shop

Adriaen van Bloemen or Adriaen Bloem (baptized on 27 February 1639 – c. 1697) was a Flemish painter, print designer, draughtsman and engraver. He was mainly a portrait artist who created individual and group portraits. He left his native Antwerp to work in Vienna where he became court painter to Emperor Leopold I. His work is mainly known through the prints made after it by various engravers.

== Life ==
Van Bloemen was born in Antwerp. In the guild year 1656–1657, he was registered at the Antwerp Guild of Saint Luke as a pupil of Jan Peeters I, a painter known for his seascapes and topographical drawings. There is no record of him becoming admitted as a master at the Antwerp Guild.

He left his native Antwerp to work in Vienna where he became court painter to Emperor Leopold I. The date of his arrival in Vienna is not known. He is first recorded in Vienna on 10 July 1668 when he was married to Maria Caecilia Offenbach, the daughter of Jacob von Offenbach.

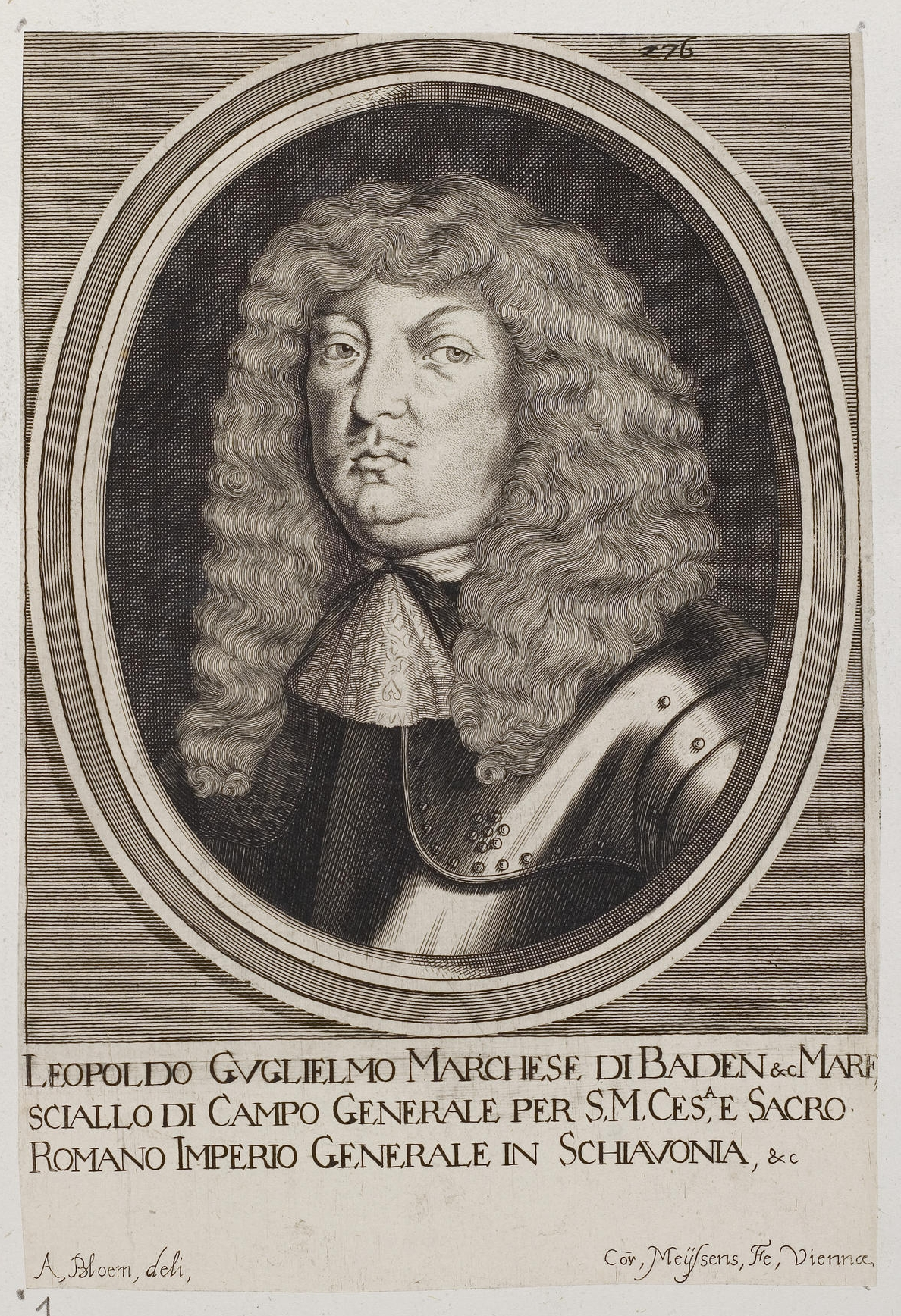
Portrait of Leopold Wilhelm of Baden-Baden engraved by Cornelis Meyssens after design by van Bloemen

The place and time of van Bloemen's death are not known. It is believed he died in Vienna in or after 1694. He is last recorded in Vienna on 30 January 1694, the date on which his wife died.

== Work ==
While he trained under an artist who was a landscape artist, van Bloemen specialised in portrait painting. He created individual and group portraits. His work is mainly known through the prints made after it by various engravers. While in Vienna, he signed his works with "A. Bloem".

Very few paintings are attributed to him. There is a signed Portrait of Prince Gundakar von Dietrichstein at the Libochovice Castle. The painting In the draper's shop (1670s, Hallwyl Museum), which is signed 'A Bloem. f' (right on front of the business desk) shows that he may have been inspired by the paintings he saw in Vienna. There was a painting on the same subject in the collection of the emperor (now in the Kunsthistorisches Museum in Vienna) referred to as A Gentlemen in the Draper's shop by the Dutch painter Frans van Mieris the Elder. A group portrait signed. 'A. Bloem' was auctioned in Amsterdam on 15/16 April 1902 but its location is currently unknown.

Van Bloemen collaborated on the publication of Galeazzo Gualdo Priorato's Historia di Leopoldo Cesare, published Johann Baptist Hacque in Vienna (vols. 1-2, 1670; vol. 3, 1674). The first volume described the political and military successes of Emperor Leopold I between 1656 and 1670. It was illustrated with prints after designs primarily by Netherlandish artists with portraits of European monarchs and important aristocrats, as well as castle scenes, battle scenes, maps and ceremonies. Van Bloemen provided a number of the designs for portraits which were engraved by other artists. The Dutch and Flemish artists contributing were Frans Geffels, Jan de Herdt, Franciscus van der Steen, Gerard Bouttats, Cornelis Meyssens, Jacob Toorenvliet, Leonard Hendrik van Otteren (fl. 1670 - 1713) and Sebastian van Dryweghen (fl. 1670-76). German and Italian artists Moritz Lang (fl. c. 1647 - 1670), Johann Martin Lerch (1643 - 1693) and Johann Holst (fl. 17th century), Marco Boschini and 'Il Bianchi' also contributed.
