= Meyssens =

Meyssens is a surname. Notable people with the surname include:

- Cornelis Meyssens, Flemish engraver
- Joannes Meyssens (1612–1670), Flemish painter

== See also ==
- Harold Meyssen (born 1971), Belgian footballer
