= Cornelis Meyssens =

Flemish engraver

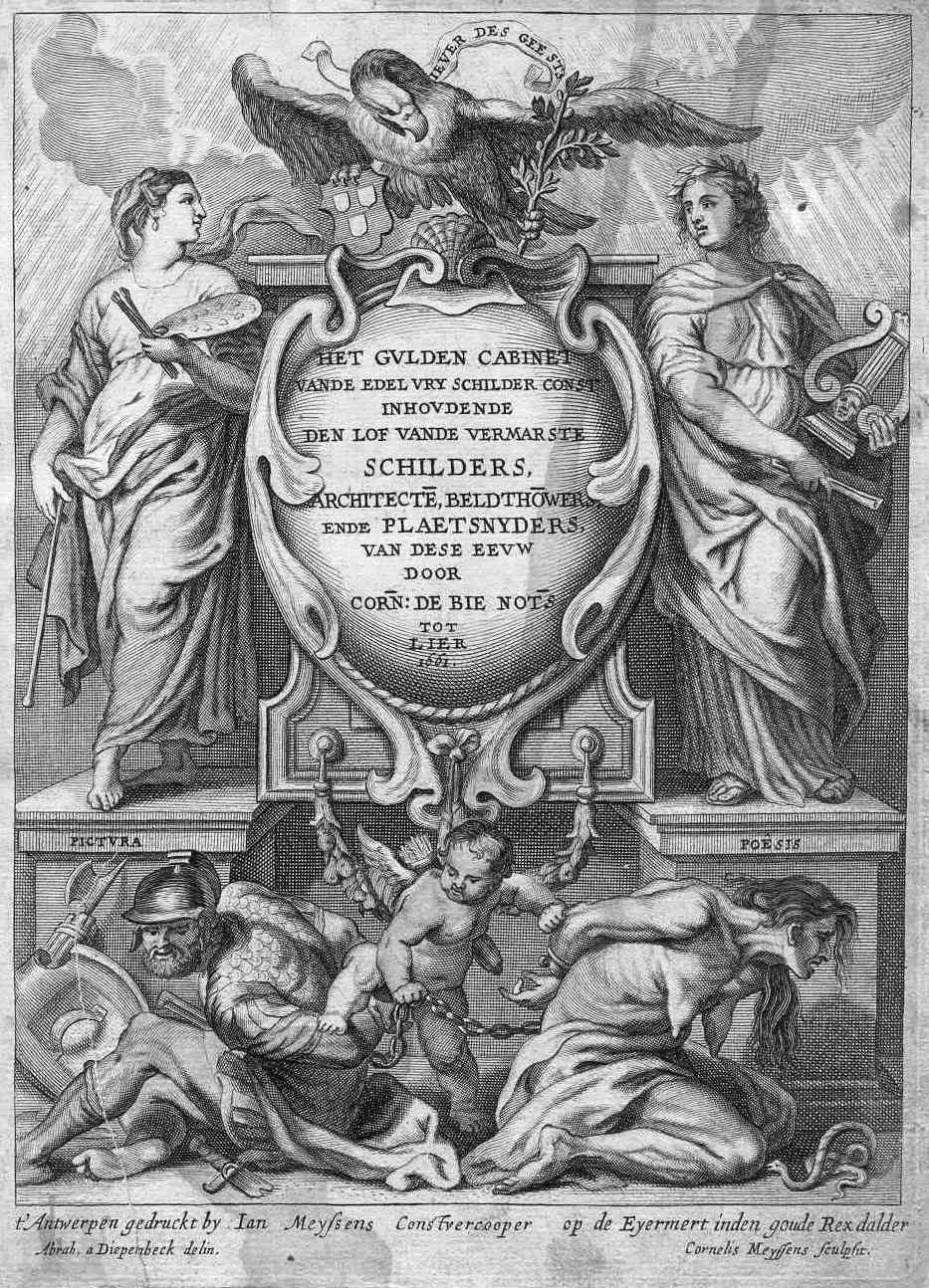
Title page of Het Gulden Cabinet

Cornelis Meyssens or Cornelis Meijssens (baptised 1640, Antwerp, – after 1670, possibly Vienna) was a Flemish engraver and printmaker, known for his reproductive prints after famous painters and portraits. He trained in his native Antwerp and later moved to Vienna where he worked for the remainder of his life.

== Life ==
Cornelis Meyssens was baptised on 3 July 1640 in Antwerp, and was the son of the prominent engraver and print publisher Joannes Meyssens and Anna Jacobs. He trained with his father and was registered as a 'wijnmeester' (i.e. son of a master] at the Antwerp Guild of Saint Luke in the Guild year 1660–1661.

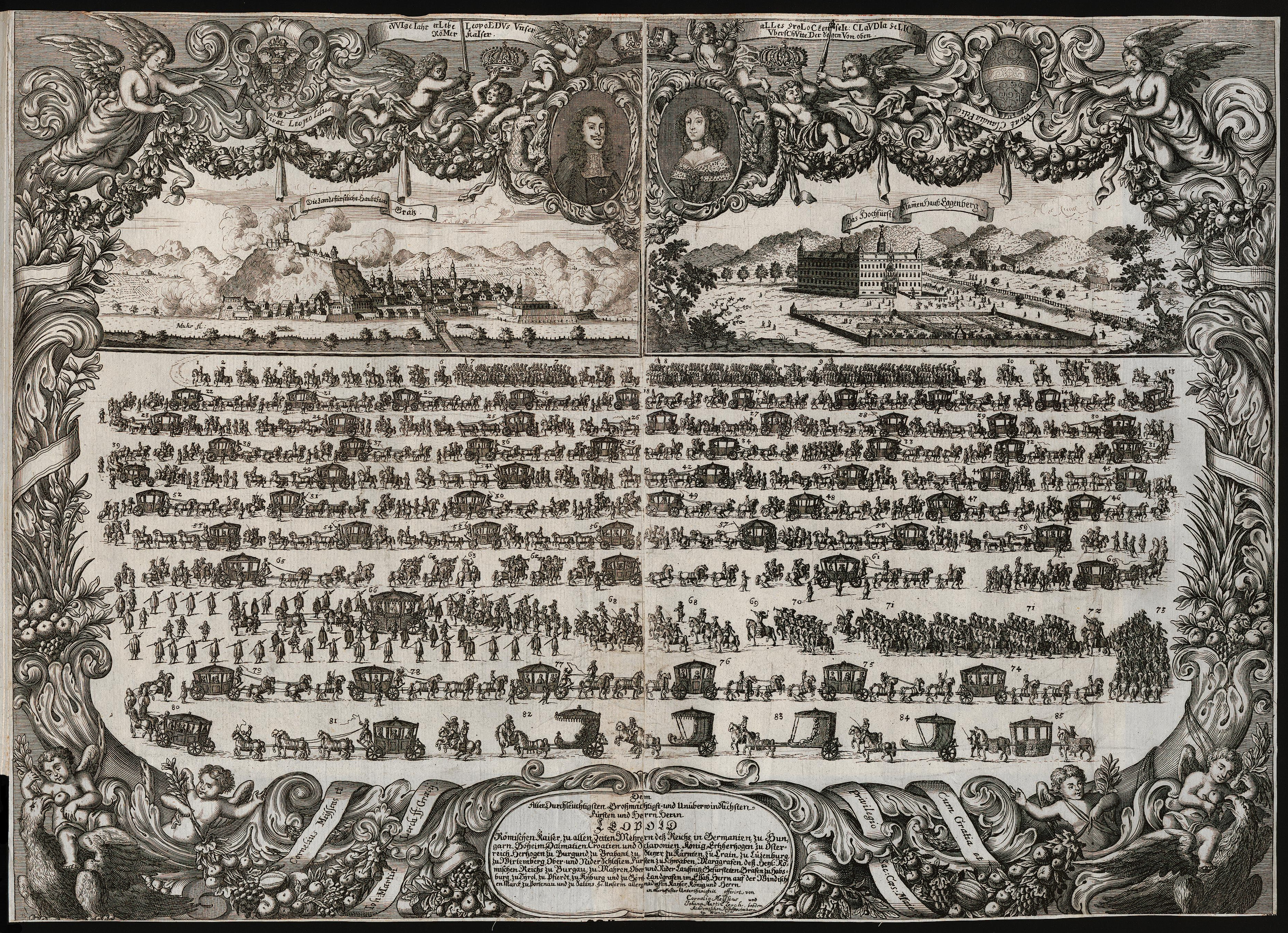
Procession for the wedding of Emperor Leopold with Claudia Felicitas of Austria

Cornelis worked on the publication projects of his father from a young age. In 1660 he had a portrait of Charles II of England with his signature published. The following year he was praised by Cornelis de Bie, whose book of artist biographies Het Gulden Cabinet vande Edel Vry Schilder-Const was published by Cornelis' father in 1662. The book included a number of prints engraved by Cornelis, including the frontispiece, which was made after a design by Abraham van Diepenbeeck.

He worked on various of his father's publications including portraits of past and present noblemen and women of Flanders, Holland and the Holy Roman Empire. It is possible that the publication by his father in 1663 of the Effigies Imperatorum Domus Austriacae with portraits of members of the Austrian imperial family attracted the attention of publishers in Vienna. The fact is that from 1673 onwards he is recorded in Vienna where he lived in the Barlotti house at the Stubenthor. His children and first wife died here. He remarried in Vienna 28 February 1677 to Catharina Westhausin from Westphalia. In Vienna he worked on various publication projects often in cooperation with other artists and publishers from Flanders or the Dutch Republic.

The place and time of his death are not recorded but it was likely in Vienna.

== Work ==
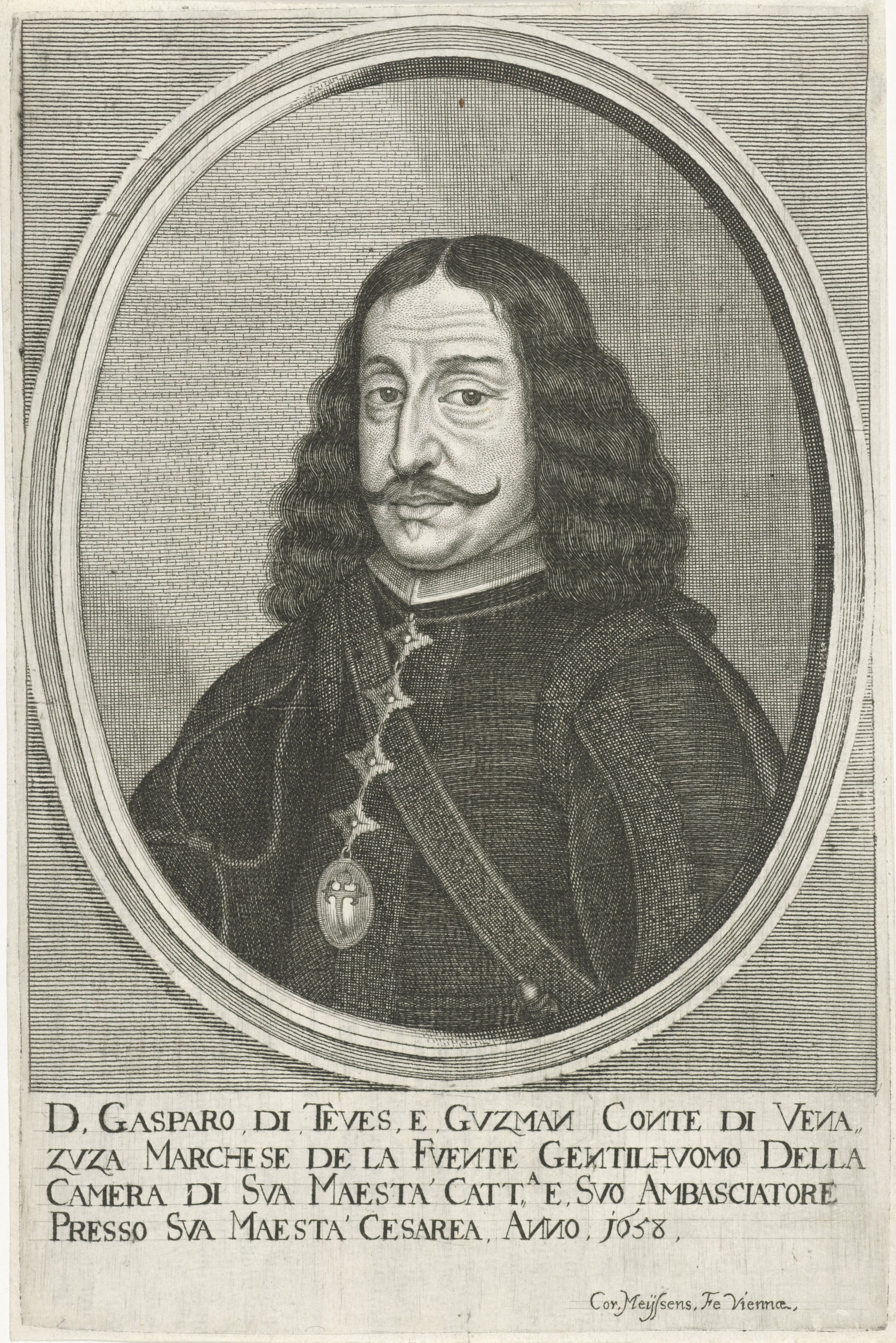
Portrait of Don Gaspar de Tebes y Tello de Guzmán

Meyssens worked as an engraver who produced mainly portrait engravings and frontispieces of books after designs by other artists. He made a few reproductive prints after artworks of the masters such as his Saint Roch interceding for the Plague-stricken after Peter Paul Rubens.

Meyssens collaborated on the publication of Galeazzo Gualdo Priorato's Historia di Leopoldo Cesare, by Johann Baptist Hacque in Vienna (vols. 1-2, 1670; vol. 3, 1674). The first volume described the political and military successes of Emperor Leopold I between 1656 and 1670. It was illustrated with prints after designs primarily by Netherlandish artists with portraits of European monarchs and important aristocrats, as well as castle scenes, battle scenes, maps and ceremonies. Meyssens engraved a number of the portraits that were included in this work; apart from Meyssens, the Dutch and Flemish artists contributing were Frans Geffels, Jan de Herdt, Franciscus van der Steen, Gerard Bouttats, Adriaen van Bloemen, Jacob Toorenvliet, Leonard Hendrik van Otteren (fl. 1670 - 1713) and Sebastian van Dryweghen (fl. 1670-76). German and Italian artists Moritz Lang (fl. c. 1647 - 1670), Johann Martin Lerch (1643 - 1693), Johann Holst (fl. 17th century), Marco Boschini and 'Il Bianchi' also contributed.
