= Sbarra =

Sbarra may refer to:

== People ==
- Francesco Sbarra (1611-1668), Italian poet and librettist
- Joe Sbarra (born 1998), English professional footballer

== Others ==
- Gioventù alla sbarra, a 1953 Italian crime drama film
