= Matthijs Naiveu =

Dutch Golden Age painter

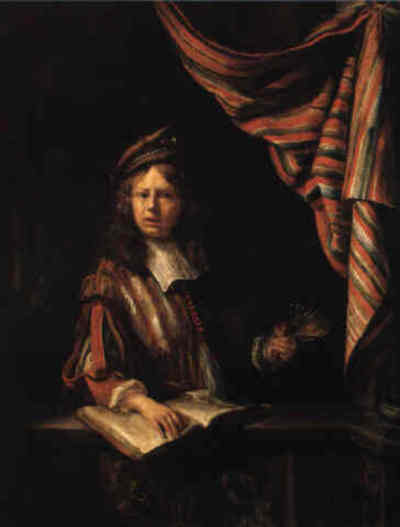
- 'Matthijs Naiveu self-portrait.
- Born: Matthijs Naiveu; 1647; Leiden
- Died: 1726 (aged 78–79); Amsterdam
- Known for: Painting
- Movement: Baroque

Matthys or Matthijs Naiveu (16 April 1647 in Leiden – 4 June 1726 in Amsterdam) was a Dutch Golden Age painter.

== Biography ==
According to Houbraken he was trained in drawing by Abraham Toorenvliet (1620–1692), a glass painter and drawing instructor (and father of Jacob Toorenvliet), and he learned the art of painting from Gerrit Dou. At the time Houbraken was writing he was still alive and painting in Amsterdam, where he worked as the "Hop inspector" for the brewers of Amsterdam. His works were genre pieces; merry company interiors with people drinking tea or playing cards, but also kraamkamertjes, or visits to newborn baby's. His largest work was a seven works of mercy, which Houbraken found his best work. In 1671 he entered the Leiden Guild of St. Luke and he was highly productive as a painter of signed work; his earliest dated painting is from 1668, and his last from 1721.

== Paintings ==
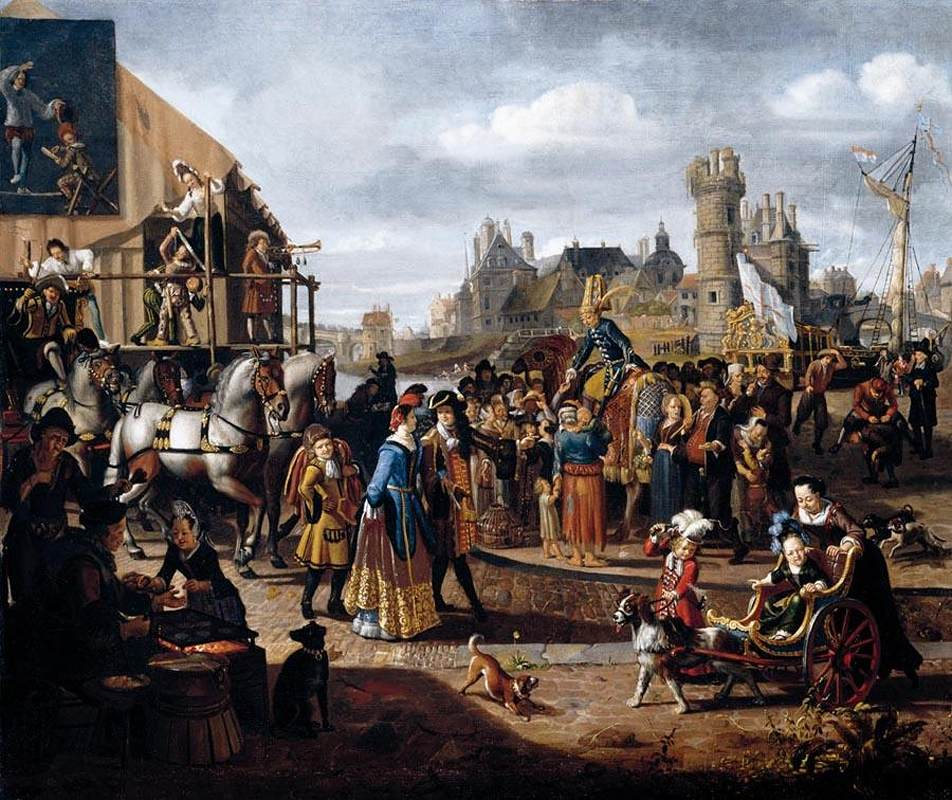
Carnival Scene.

His paintings from his earlier years such as the children blowing soap bubbles (Museum of Fine Arts, Boston) are strongly influenced by Gerrit Dou, with architectural elements framing the scene. Later he adopted a more general genre-works style.
