= Nicola Avancini =

Italian Jesuit cleric, playwright and ascetical writer

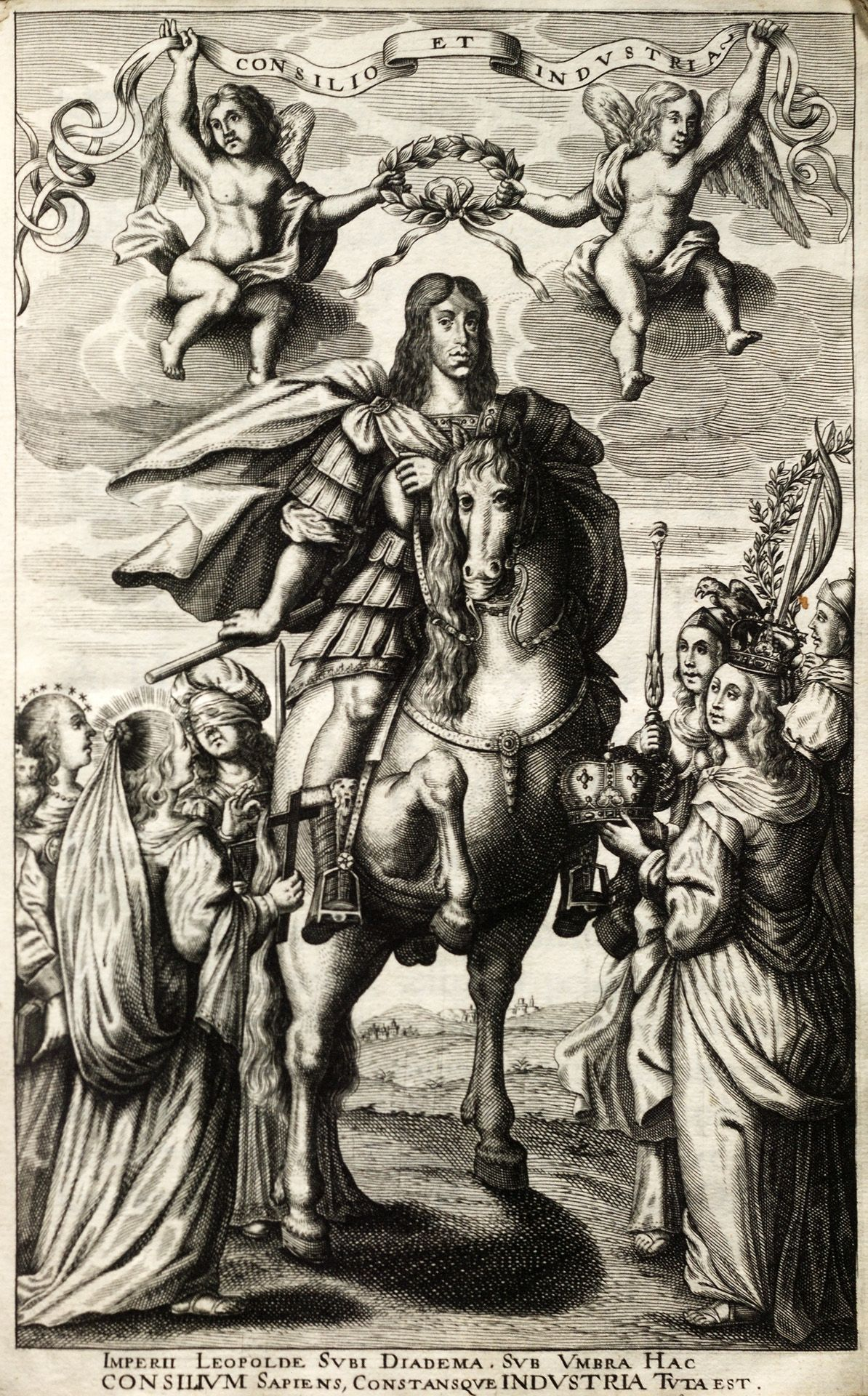
Frontispiece of the Magno Primo Romano-Germanico Caesare, 1658, engraved by Gerard Bouttats

Nicola Avancini (1 December 1611 – 6 December 1686) was an Italian Jesuit cleric, playwright and ascetical writer.

== Biography ==
Avancini was born in the Tyrol. He entered the Society of Jesus in 1627, and for some years held the chair of rhetoric and philosophy at University of Graz, and subsequently that of theology at Vienna. He was rector of the Colleges of Passau, Vienna, and Graz, Provincial of the Austrian Province, Visitor of Bohemia, and at his death Assistant for the German Provinces of the Society.

In the midst of these duties he published works on philosophy, theology, and sacred literature. His Meditations on the Life and Doctrines of Jesus Christ has maintained some popularity. This work, originality in Latin, was translated into the principal European languages and went through many editions. The English version in use contains much additional matter drawn from the works of other authors. But these meditations, in their simple as well as their extended form, have assisted in the task of daily meditation.

To Nicola Avancini has been attributed the Imperium Romano-Germanicum, a Carolo Magno Primo Romano-Germanico Caesare, per Quadraginta Novem Imperatores et Germaniae Reges, et ex his per XIV.. published in Vienna in 1658 (Typis Matthiae Cosmerovii). The book contains panegyrics of 50 German-Roman emperors written by Avancini in verse. C. J. Piripach wrote the Introductory "oratio". The Flemish engraver Gerard Bouttats who worked for the University of Vienna engraved the frontispiece and the 50 imperial busts that illustrate the text.

Avancini was also the author of sermons and a large number of dramas, suitable for presentation by college students. Avancini's Pietas victrix (Vienna 1650) is considered one of the most important Neo-Latin Jesuit dramas. The historical drama centres around Constantine the Great's victory over his co-emperor and adversary, Maxentius, in the decisive Battle of the Milvian Bridge (312 BC).

== Modern Editions of Avancini's works ==
- Pietas victrix = Der Sieg der Pietas, ed., transl. and with introduction by Lothar Mundt and Ulrich Seelbach, Tübingen: Niemeyer 2002 (Frühe Neuzeit 73)

== Bibliography ==
- Egger, Martina (2001). Nikolaus von Avancini S.J., die Theologie eines Jesuitendramatikers. Innsbruck.
- Neuhauser, Walter (1962). "Zur Lyrik des Tiroler Jesuitendichters Nikolaus Avancini". Serta Philologica Aenipontana. 7–8: 425–456.
