= Joannes Meyssens =

Flemish painter (1612–1670)

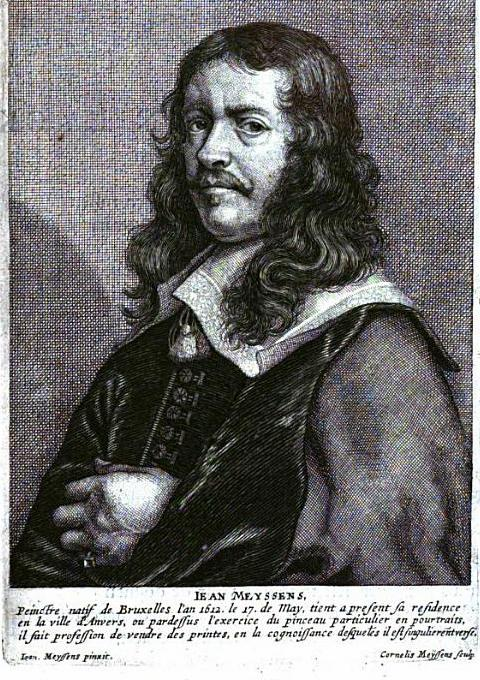
- Joannes Meyssens, engraving by his son Cornelis after a self-portrait
- Born: 17 May 1612; Brussels
- Died: 18 September 1670 (aged 58); Antwerp
- Known for: Painting, engraving, printing
- Movement: Baroque

Joannes (Johannes, Jan, or Jean) Meyssens (17 May 1612 – 18 September 1670) was a Flemish Baroque painter, engraver, and print publisher.

== Life ==
He was born in Brussels, but moved to Antwerp at an early age, where he became master of the Guild of St. Luke in 1640. He married Anna Jacobs (died 1678). Joannes Meyssens' son Cornelis became also an engraver who later worked in Vienna.

== Work ==
He had a successful business collaborating with contemporary painters and engravers, and is most notable today for his book of prints called Image de divers hommes d'esprit sublime qui par leur art et science devront vivre eternellement et des quels la lovange et renommée faict estonner le monde, A Anvers mis en lumiere par Iean Meyssens peinctre et vendeur de lart au Cammestraet l'an .M.DC.XLIX, published in 1649. This book, with the engraved portraits of many famous men, including many painters, was used again and again as a source for art historians, most notably in Cornelis de Bie's, Het Gulden Cabinet (Antwerp, 1662), who wrote this work at the instigation of Meyssens. In 1694, an English version was published in London with the title The True Effigies of the most Eminent Painters, and other famous artists that have flourished in Europe.

The descriptions in French that Meyssens added under each engraving were used as biographical notes by later art historians such as Filippo Baldinucci, Joachim von Sandrart and Arnold Houbraken.

He influenced Theodoor van Merlen.
