= Cornelis de Bie =

Flemish writer and jurist (1627–c. 1712)

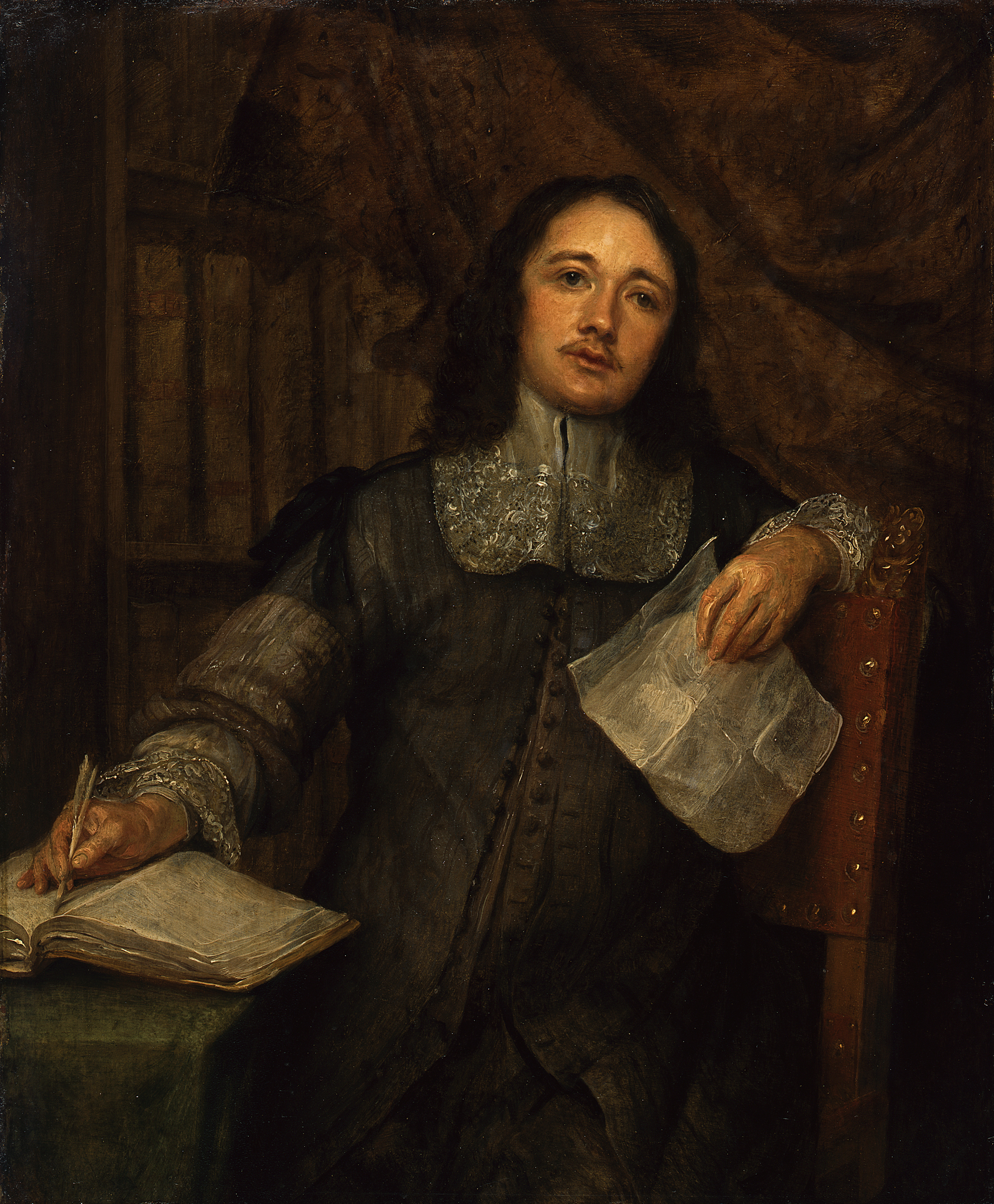
- de Bie by Gonzales Coques
- Born: 10 February 1627; Lier, Duchy of Brabant, Spanish Netherlands
- Died: c. 1712–1715 (aged 84–88)
- Education: University of Leuven
- Occupations: Poet, writer, politician, bookseller, notary
- Writing career
- Period: 17th century
- Genres: Drama, art history, emblem books
- Notable work: Het Gulden Cabinet

Signature
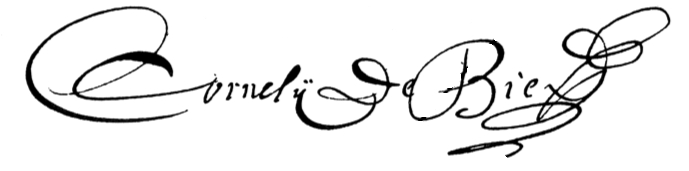

Cornelis de Bie (10 February 1627 – c. 1712–1715) was a rhetorician, poet, jurist and minor politician from Lier in the Spanish Netherlands. He was the author of about 64 works, mostly comedies. He is known internationally today for his biographical sketches of Flemish and Dutch painters in his Het Gulden Cabinet der Edel Vry Schilderconst (English: The Golden Cabinet of the Noble Liberal Art of Painting), first printed in 1662.

== Biography ==
Cornelis was the son of the painter Adriaan de Bie and member of the Chamber of Rhetoric in Lier known as den Groeyenden Boom. After his study at the Faculty of Arts at the University of Leuven, he returned to Lier where he became a notary and bookseller. He was married twice: first to Elisabeth Smits, who died in 1662, and then to Isabella Caelheyt, who died in 1706. He had eight children, four from each wife. He died after 1712 and before 1715.

== Het Gulden Cabinet der Edel Vry Schilderconst (1662) ==
When the publisher Jan Meyssen asked Cornelis de Bie to write a book on painters, he started out to write the most important Dutch book on painters of the seventeenth century. This book of artist biographies continues the traditions of Karel van Mander's Schilder-Boeck and Giorgio Vasari's Vite. He used biographical material from Karel van Mander and Giorgio Vasari, but the importance of this work is that it is the only known biography for many painters of the seventeenth century that were active after Vasari and van Mander's periods. Because it is written in verse form, it is rather difficult to read today, but it is longer than 500 pages and includes engravings of more than 50 painters from period paintings and drawings. He was an important source for Arnold Houbraken, who refers to him as K. de Bie, short for Kornelis de Bie.

The work was first published in 1662 in Antwerp and de Bie prepared a second edition of the work, but that was never published and the manuscript is now in the Koninklijk Bibliotheek van België (Royal Library of Belgium) in Brussels. The work included the biographies of painters, sculptors and architects, both already deceased and living. Most of the work is written in verse and therefore, it is rather a panegyric. The full title of the work is Het Gulden Cabinet vande edele vry Schilder-Const, Ontsloten door den lanck ghewenschten Vrede tusschen de twee machtighe Croonen van Spaignien en Vrancryck, Waer-inne begrepen is den ontsterffelijcken loff vande vermaerste Constminnende Geesten ende Schilders Van deze Eeuw, hier inne meest naer het leven af-gebeldt, verciert met veel vermakelijcke Rijmen ende Spreucken. There are also indications that it was rapidly set and printed and therefore, it is possible that it was mainly meant as a commercial work.

=== Poetry versus historical accuracy ===
Like Vasari and Van Mander before him, de Bie's biographies are interspersed with amusing anecdotes. Although such literary motifs belong to a long rhetorical tradition, many of these stories were labelled "historically unreliable" by leading historians in the 19th century and only recently have some of them been reinstated. However, since they were also often the only surviving source of information about certain painters, these stories have always been repeated as hard facts about the lives of other painters appearing in the stories. Examples are when Cornelis de Bie describes apprenticeships that were considered improbable because the artist painted in a completely different genre than the teacher. An example is De Bie's statement that Philips Wouwerman trained with Frans Hals. Later historians claimed this was improbable, because Wouwerman painted landscapes with horses and Hals was a portrait painter. Today this is still considered by some to be improbable, though Hals clearly had a large workshop and took on his sons as well as other pupils.

== Works ==
=== Prose ===
- Het Gulden Cabinet der Edel Vry Schilderconst (1662) (reprint: 1971)
- D'omghekeerde maet der liefde (1663)
- Faems Weer-galm der Neder-duytsche poësie (1670)
- Den weerschijn van 't leven in de doodt (1680?)
- Het sout der sielen welvaart (1688) (trans. from Latin)
- Den zedigen toetsteen van de onverdragelijcke weelde, verthoont in 't leven van den verloren soon (1689)
- Den wegh der deughden beset met scherpe dornen van quellinghen (1697)
- Antiquiteyten der stadt Lier, in Brabant, byeen vergadert uyt verscheyde annotatie boeken ende curieuse stukken, beginnende int jaer 762 tot 1699 (manuscript)
- Het leven van de heylige Eugenia (1701)
- Echos weder-clanck, passende op den gheestelijcken wecker, tot godtvruchtige oeffeninghen (1706)
- Den spiegel van de verdrayde werelt, te sien in den bedriegelijcken handel, sotte en ongeregelde manieren van het al te broos menschen-leven (1708)
- Mengelrijmen, Meygaven, Lier-en Sneldichten (manuscript)

=== Plays ===
- Alphonsus en Thebasile ofte herstelde onnooselheyt, tragi-comedie op den sin: Oprechte Liefde (1673)
- De cluchte van den verdraeyden advocaet (en de twee borssesnyders) verthoont binnen Lyer den 16 en 17 juny 1659 (1673)
- Den heyligen ridder Gommarus, patroon der stadt Lier, oft gewillighe verduldigheyt; op het tooneel ghebrocht door de liefhebbers van d'edele gulde, die men noemt Den groeyenden Boom, binnen de voorschreven stadt Lier, den 23 en 25 juny 1669
- Cluchte van een misluckt overspel, op den sin: Daer d'ongheregheltheyt van een onkuys ghedacht (1669)
- Den grooten hertoghe van Moskovien oft gheweldighe heerschappye, Bly-eyndich treurspel (1673)
- Treurspel van de heylighe Cecilia, martelaresse, ghenoemt den Spieghel van d' Eerbaerheydt
- Cluchte van Jan Goethals en Griet, zijn wijf, bedroghen door twee geapposteerde soldaten, verbetert en vermeerdert door C. De Bie
- De cluchte van den jaloursen dief, afbeldende d'onghetrouwicheyt, bemonden achterclap en onversaefde lichtveerdicheyt der menschen, in Reynaldo Plattebors en madam Sacatrap
- Den verloren zoon Osias oft bekeerden Zondaer
- Het goddelijck ransoen der zielen salicheyt, in dry deelen
- Clucht-wijse comedie van de Mahometaensche slavinne Sultana Bacherach
- De verlichte waerheyt van Godts vleesch-gheworden woordt in de gheboorte Christi
- 'T geloofs beproevinghe verthoont in de stantvastighe verduldigheyt van de seer edele Roomsche princesse de heylighe Eugenia, blyeyndigh treurspel
- Beschermde suyverheyt in de twee heylige Theodora en Didymus, martelaren om 't Rooms geloof onthooft, treurspel
- Kluchte van Hans Holleblock, geusen predicant
- Vermaekelijcke klucht van Roeland den Klapper oft Hablador Roelando
- Wraak van verkrachte kuysheydt, bewesen in 't ramp-salig leven van de princerse Theocrina omteert van den ontuchtigen en bloetgierigen Amurath
- De klucht van den nieuw-gesinden doctoor, meester Quinten-Quack en Cortisaen sijnen bly-geestigen knecht
- Kluchtwijse Commedie van de ontmaskerde liefde
- Leer-gierich ondersoeck der verlichte duysterheyt en weet-lievende kennisse der waerheyt, bewesen in 't Rooms christen gheloof door den heylighen Epictetus en den seer edelen en overschoonen Astion
- Het vlaemsche masker van Colonel Spindeler, archlistelijck ontdeckt aen de lichtveerdige françoisen door Oniati, borgemeester van Brugge, anno 1658
- Lijden sonder wraak, of de Armoede van grave Florelus, bontgenoot van Vranckrijck, blyeyndich treurspel
- De klucht van den Subtijlen Smidt, of het vinden van 't maet-ghesangh oft musica
- De klucht van Gijs Snuffelaer en 't lichtveerdigh Pleuntjen, genoemt d'occasie maekt den dief
- De comedie der Liersche Furie, of de kettersche verradery op den 14 october 1595
- De klucht van den bedroghen soldaet
- De klucht van den stouten Boer oft gheveynsten Auditeur
- De comedie van Mas Aniello in de beroerte van Napels, ghenoemt: Op en Nedergangh van 's menschen leven
- Blyeyndigh treurspel van de gravinne Nympha en Carel, hertogh van Calabrien, of wraak-lustighe liefde
- De klucht van de ramp-salighe liefde in den ongetrouwen minnaer
- Het droef-eyndigh toch geluck-saligh Treurspel van de twee heylighe martelaren Crispinus en Crispianus, of Standtvastighe Lijdtsaemheydt
- De klucht van den bedroghen duyvel der onkuysheyt en Deep (sic) makenden geusen Predicant in 't spelen met de kaert
- De comedie van Apollonius en Hildebertus, twee verliefde minnaren van edel geslacht, of de verloren gelegentheyt
- De klucht van de bedroghen gierigheyt in Judas en de bedwonghen vrientschap van Pilatus
- Klucht van het bedriegelyck mal (1710)

== Sources ==
- Cornelis de Bie in the Dictionary of Art Historians
- Cornelis de Bie on the DBNL (in Dutch)
- Kalff, G., Geschiedenis der Nederlandsche letterkunde. Deel 5. J.B. Wolters, Groningen, 1910
- Lemmens, "Introduction", in Het Gulden Cabinet der Edel Vry Schilderconst, 1971
- Van Boeckel, L., Cornelis de Bie. Zijn Leven en zijne werken. Lier, 1910
- Willems, J.F. (red.), Belgisch museum voor de Nederduitsche tael- en letterkunde en de geschiedenis des vaderlands (Vierde deel). Maatschappij tot Bevordering der Nederduitsche Taal- en Letterkunde, Gent 1840.
