= Schottenkirche, Vienna =

Church in Vienna, Austria

Schottenkirche
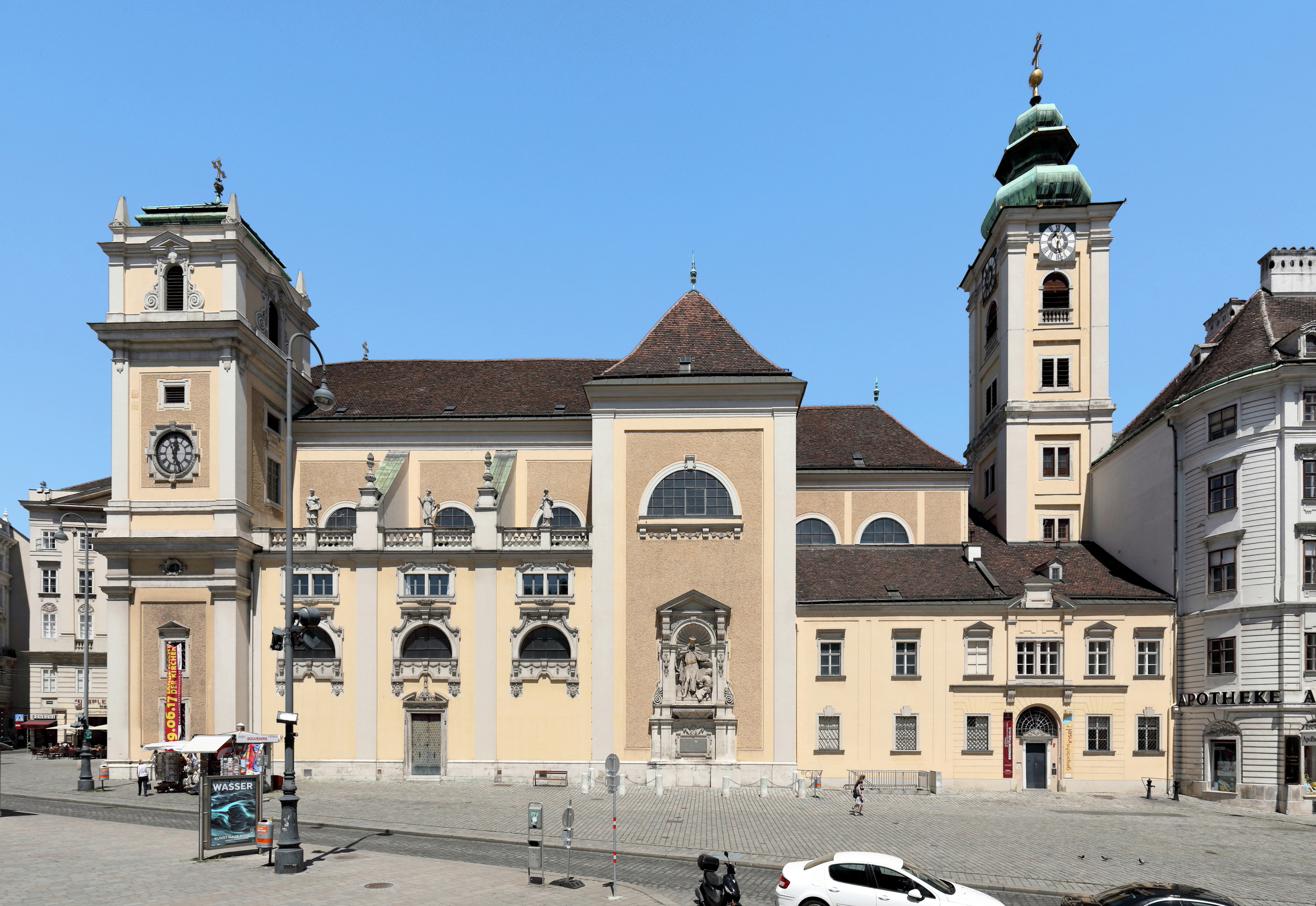
- Schottenkirche, Freyung, Vienna

- Location within Vienna Location within Austria

Religion
- Affiliation: Catholic Church
- Leadership: P. Nikolaus Poch o.s.b

Location
- Location: Vienna, Austria
- Coordinates: 48.2119°N 16.3647°E

Architecture
- Type: Church, Basilica Minor
- Style: Baroque

Specifications
- Direction of façade: W
- Length: 55 m
- Width: 25 m
- Width (nave): 15 m

Website
- www.schottenpfarre.at

The Schottenkirche (English: Scots Church) is a parish church in Vienna attached to the Schottenstift, founded by Irish (in Medieval Latin scoti) Benedictine monks in the 12th century. In 1418, the Duke Albert V of Austria transferred it to the German-speaking Benedictine monks from the Melk Abbey during the Melker Reform initiated after the Council of Constance. The church was elevated to the rank of Basilica Minor in 1958.

The Schottenkirche is located in the Freyung in the first district of Vienna's Innere Stadt.

== History ==
Irish missionaries out of monasteries in Ireland and Scotland (Iro-Schotten, Hiberno-Scottish) were instrumental in the spread of Christianity in Continental Europe during the Middle Ages. Of special importance in Austria is Saint Koloman of Stockerau (of Melk) killed near Vienna in 1012. This Irish monk of royal lineage killed at Stockerau while on pilgrimage to Jerusalem was patron saint of Austria until 1663.

During the 11th and the 12th century, Iro -Schotten Monasteries sprang up, intended exclusively for monks from monasteries in Ireland and the now Scottish isles. The famous Scottish Monastery of St. Jacob at Ratisbon, built around 1090 by Burgrave Otto of Ratisbon in Ratisbon, became the mother-house of a series of other Scots Monasteries, among them Our Blessed Lady at Vienna built in 1158.

== Exterior ==
The first church was a three-aisled Romanesque pillar church with a single apse, destroyed by a fire in 1276.

An earthquake circa 1443 greatly damaged the existing church on the site. Restorations were completed by 1449 but poorly done, due to lack of money, and on 21 May 1634, the roof collapsed in full view of Ferdinand II, Holy Roman Emperor.

The collapse of the tower, struck by a lightning bolt in 1638, was seized as an opportunity to completely rebuild the church in Baroque style. From 1638 to 1641, the reconstruction was undertaken by the architects Carlo Antonio Carlone and Marco Spazzio. From 1643 to 1648, Andrea Allio the Old, Andrea Allio the Young and Silvestro Carlone reworked the nave and the west side. In the process, the length of the church was somewhat reduced, with the result that the tower no longer stands directly beside the basilica.

After the Turkish siege, the church was restored again. As the baroque west tower was barely higher than the facade itself, its extension has often been discussed, but these plans have never come to fruition. The choir tower was dedicated only in the year 1893.

== Interior ==
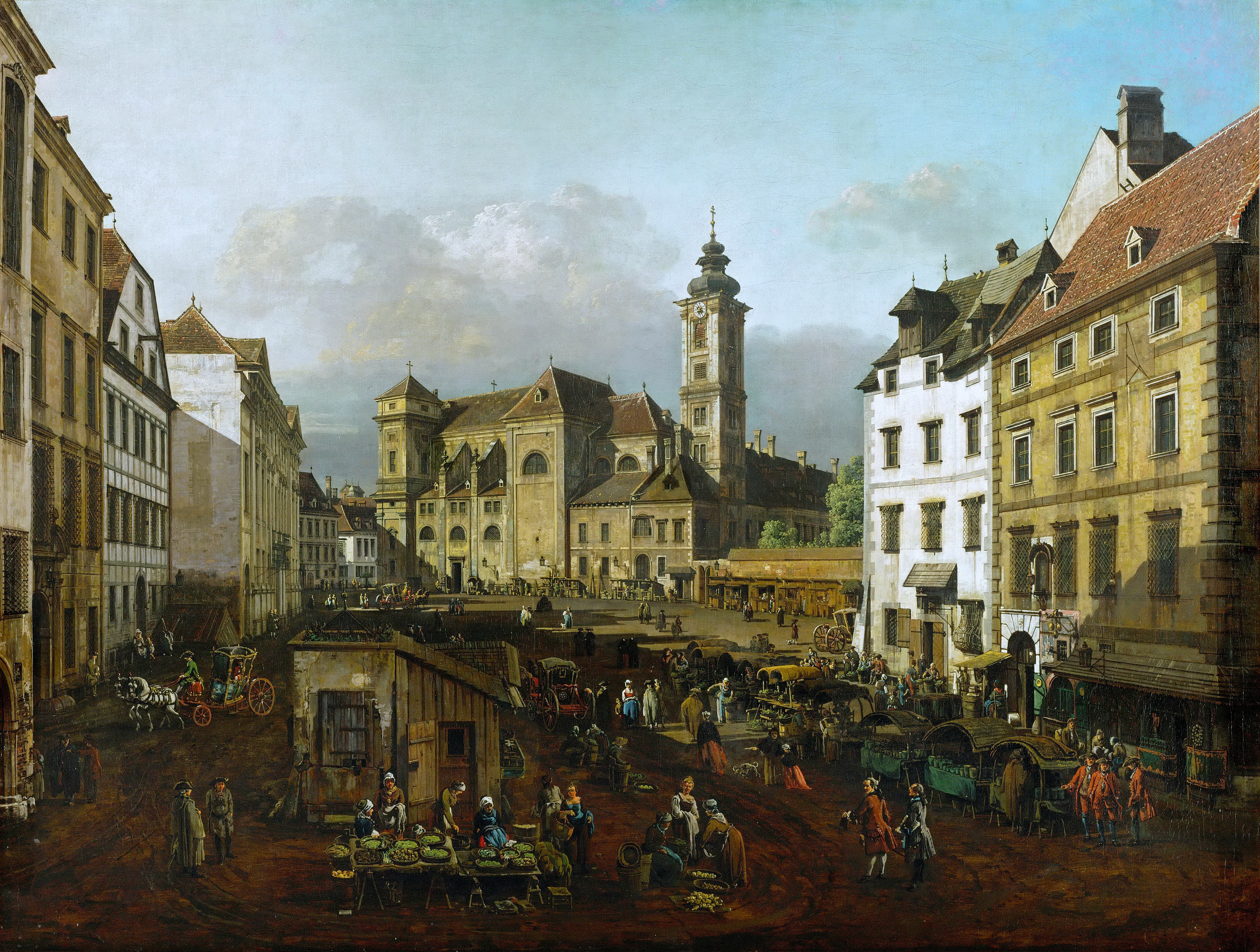
View of the Freyung and the Schottenkirche, painted by Canaletto in 1758

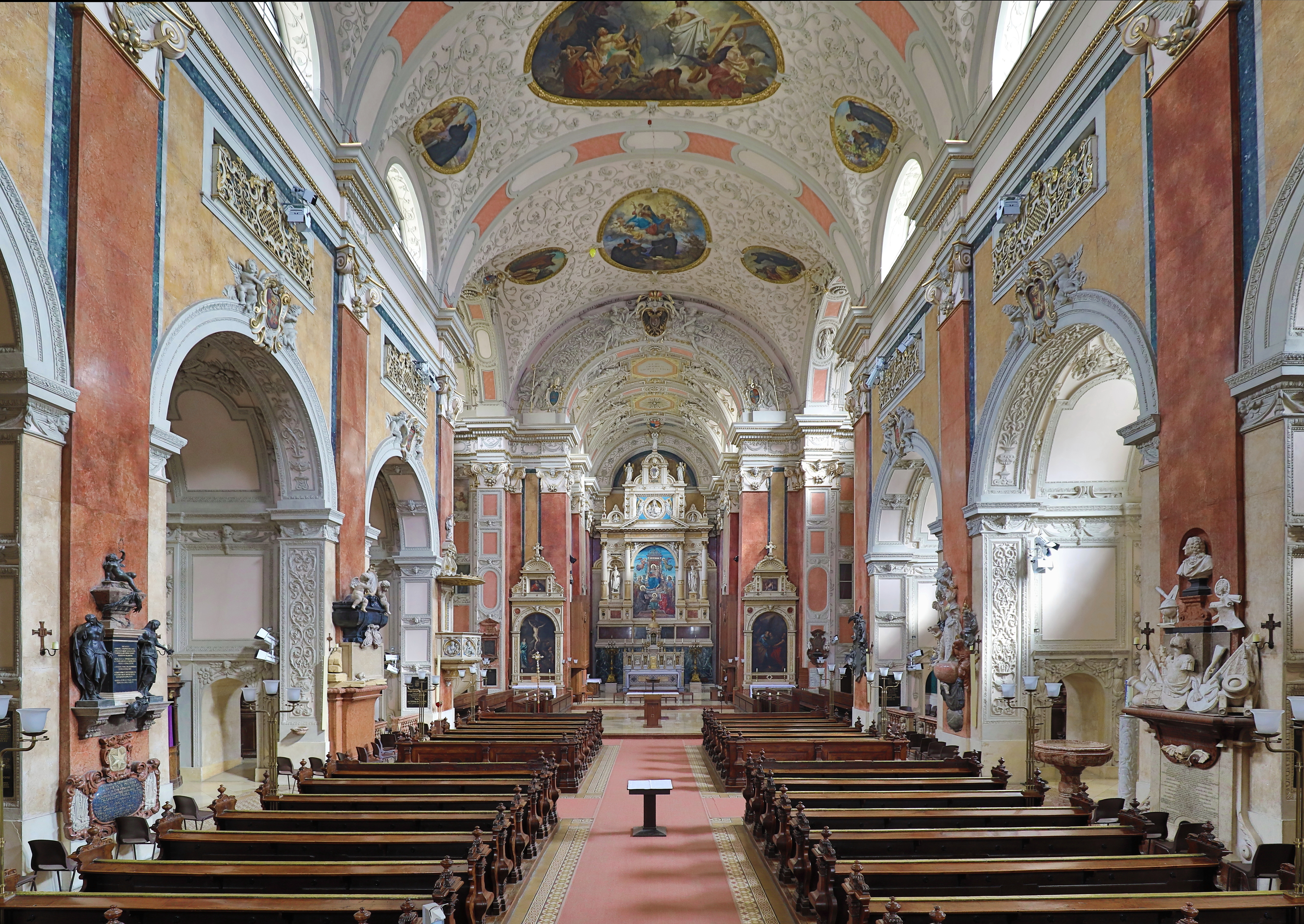
Interior of the Schottenkirche.

Inside, the church is now in high-baroque style with several chapels. Joachim von Sandrart provided the church with a new altar-piece, which today is kept in the prelates' hall.

Between 1883 and 1889, the high altar was built after sketches of Heinrich Ferstel, with Innsbruck glass mosaics by Michael Rieser. Julius Schmid (Austrian, 1854–1935) was artist for the fine ceiling paintings.

== Trivia ==
- The great Baroque musician Johann Joseph Fux was its organist around 1690.
- After composer Joseph Haydn died in Vienna, a great memorial service was held in the Schottenkirche on 15 June 1809, at which Mozart's Requiem K.626 was performed.
- Noted film director Fritz Lang was born in the parish and baptized in the Schottenkirche.
- Princess Maria-Annunciata von Liechtenstein married Emanuele Musini in this church on 4 September 2021

== See also ==
- Hiberno-Scottish mission
