= Nikolaus van Hoy =

Flemish painter, draughtsman and etcher (1631–1679)

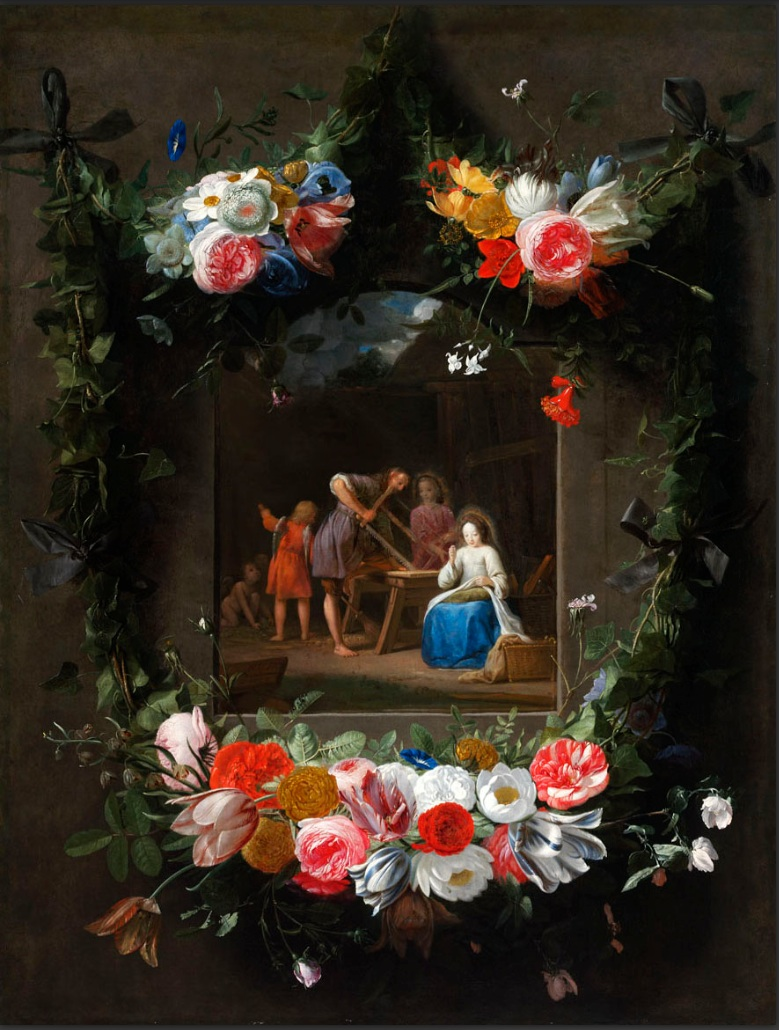
Garland of Flowers Surrounding the Holy Family, collaboration between van Hoy and Jan Anton van der Baren

Nikolaas van Hoy, known in Austria as Nikolaus van Hoy (alternative spellings of family name: 'van Hoey' and 'van Hoj') (b. Antwerp, 1631 - d. Vienna, 25 June 1679) was a Flemish Baroque painter, draughtsman and etcher.

== Life ==
He was born in Antwerp. He likely trained in Antwerp. He worked in Brussels between 1647 1655. He is also reported to have spent some time in Rome. He went to Vienna in 1657, possibly with the Dutch painter Jan van Ossenbeeck whom he would have met in Rome and had later joined him in Brussels.

In about 1667, he became the court painter of Leopold I, Holy Roman Emperor and the Archduke Leopold Wilhelm of Austria. He retained this post until his death in Vienna in 1679.

He was succeeded at the court by his son Nickolaus Van Hoy the Younger (Antwerp 1660-Vienna ca. 1710).

== Work ==
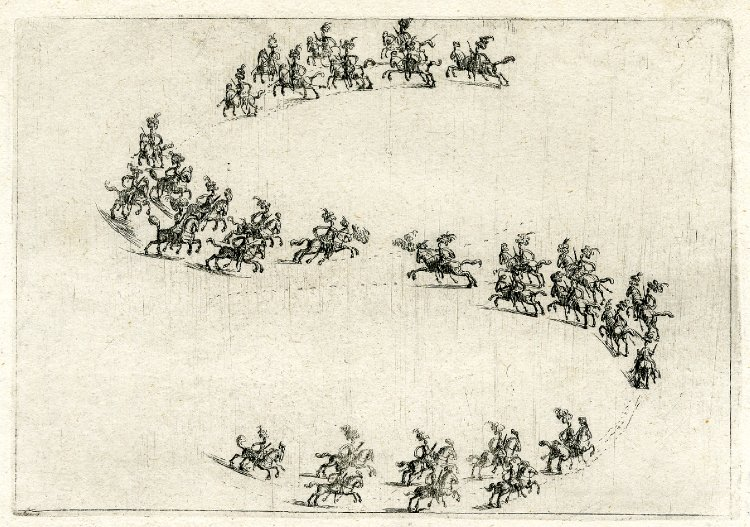
Equestrian Ballet

He made landscapes and portraits.

He engraved religious scenes and mythological figures adapted from originals of Veronese, Barocci and Raphael. He was one of the artists and engravers who collaborated with David Teniers the Younger on the publication entitled "Theatrum Pictorium", a catalogue of the picture gallery of Archduke Leopold Wilhelm. Abraham Teniers published the first edition in 1658 as loose leaves and unnumbered. The first part with 244 etchings of Italian pictures was published in Brussels in 1660, while the gallery was already in Vienna. The publication ends with an engraving by Frans van der Steen after a drawing by Nicolaus van Hoy of a view of the Stallburg gallery of the Archduke. Van Hoy was also responsible for individual engravings in the publication.

He made a series of 13 engravings of cavalcades or equestrian ballets, which were later remade by Jan van Ossenbeeck. The prints of cavalcades by Nicolaus van Hoy were published in Francesco Sbarra's 'La Contessa dell' Aria e dell' Aqua festa a cavallo rappresentata nell' augustissime nozze dell M.M. dell'Imperatore Leopold e dell' Infante Margherita della Spagne' in 1667.

He collaborated with other painters in the production of garland paintings. Garland paintings are a special type of still life developed in Antwerp by artists such as Jan Brueghel the Elder, Hendrick van Balen, Andries Daniels, Frans Francken the Younger, Peter Paul Rubens and Daniel Seghers. They typically show a flower garland around a devotional image or portrait. Garland paintings were usually collaborations between a still life and a figure painter. Van Hoy made garland paintings with other painters, such as the Flemish émigré painter Jan Anton van der Baren, who painted the flowers while Van Hoy painted the devotional image. An example is the Garland of Flowers Surrounding the Holy Family in the Museum of Fine Arts (Budapest).

Some of his works can be seen at :

- Kunsthistorisches Museum in Vienna : two scenes of battles
- Augustinerkirche, Vienna : the chapel
- Dominikanerkirche (Vienna) : the oil paintings in the pendants of the dome
- Bezirksmuseum Stockerau (Austria) : the oil painting "Heiliger Stephan"
