= Francesco Sbarra =

Italian poet and librettist

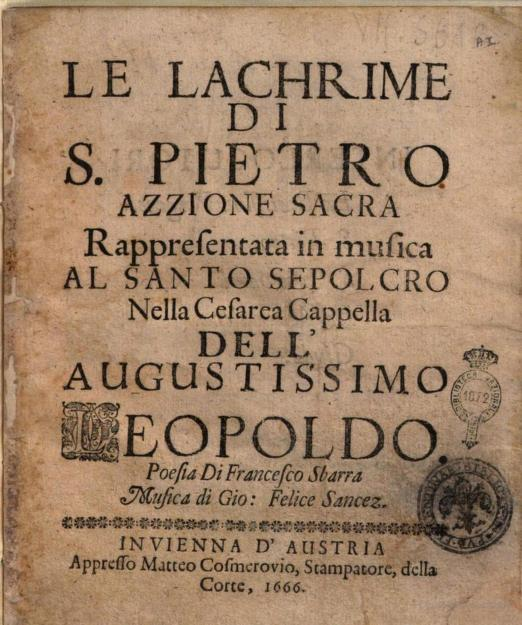
- Sbarra's libretto for Le Lachrime di San Pietro (performed in Vienna, 1666)
- Born: Lucca, Republic of Lucca
- Baptised: 18 February 1611
- Died: 20 March 1668 (aged 57); Vienna, Archduchy of Austria
- Occupations: Poet, librettist
- Spouse: Penelope Orsucci (m. 1633; died 1645)
- Children: 3
- Parent(s): Filippo Sbarra and Ortensia Sbarra (née Ciampanti)

Francesco Sbarra (18 February 1611 – 20 March 1668) was an Italian poet and librettist. Born in Lucca, he spent most of his career in Austria where he wrote the librettos for entertainments and operas at the courts of Archduke Ferdinand Charles in Innsbruck and Emperor Leopold I in Vienna. Sbarra was member of the Accademia degli Oscuri and the Accademia degli Accesi of Lucca. He corresponded with Michelangelo Torcigliani. His most famous libretto, Il pomo d'oro, was set to music by Antonio Cesti and performed at the imperial court in Vienna in 1668.

== Librettos ==
- Alessandro vincitor di se stesso (opera in a prologue and 3 acts), set by Antonio Cesti, Venice 1651
- Venere cacciatrice, set by Antonio Cesti, Innsbruck 1659
- La magnanimità d'Alessandro, set by Antonio Cesti, Innsbruck, 1662
- Nettuno e Flora festeggianti (azione teatrale), set by Antonio Cesti, Vienna, 1666
- Le Lachrime di San Pietro (azione sacra), set by Giovanni Felice Sances. Vienna. 1666
- Le disgrazie d'Amore, set by Antonio Cesti, Vienna, 1667
- La Germania esultante , set by Antonio Cesti, Vienna, 1667
- Il pomo d'oro (opera in a prologue and 5 acts), set by Antonio Cesti, Vienna, 1668
