= Jan van Ossenbeeck =

Dutch Golden Age painter

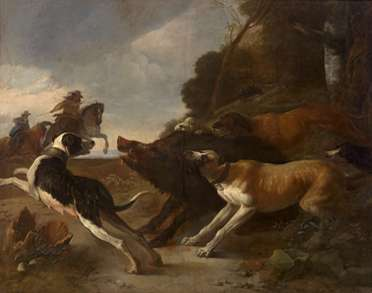
van Ossenbeeck's Boar hunting in the National Museum of Slovenia

Jan van Ossenbeeck (1623, Rotterdam – 1674, Vienna), was a Dutch Golden Age painter.

== Biography ==
According to Houbraken, who was quoting Sandrart, he painted in the manner of Pieter van Laer. He was so good at arranging animals and figures in front of grottos, waterfalls and Roman buildings that it was said that "He brought all of Rome with him". Though Houbraken later mentioned a member of the Bentvueghels nicknamed "Virgilius" as a poet from Brussels who signed the bentbrief of Abraham Genoels, he did not specify that this was Ossenbek, but wrote "...... de Bakker".

According to the RKD his nickname was "Virgillius" and he travelled to Rome during the years 1647-1655 and worked in Brussels 1656-1660 before moving to Vienna. He is known for Italianate landscapes and prints.

== External link ==
- Jan van Ossenbeeck on Artnet
