= Jacob Toorenvliet =

Dutch Golden Age painter

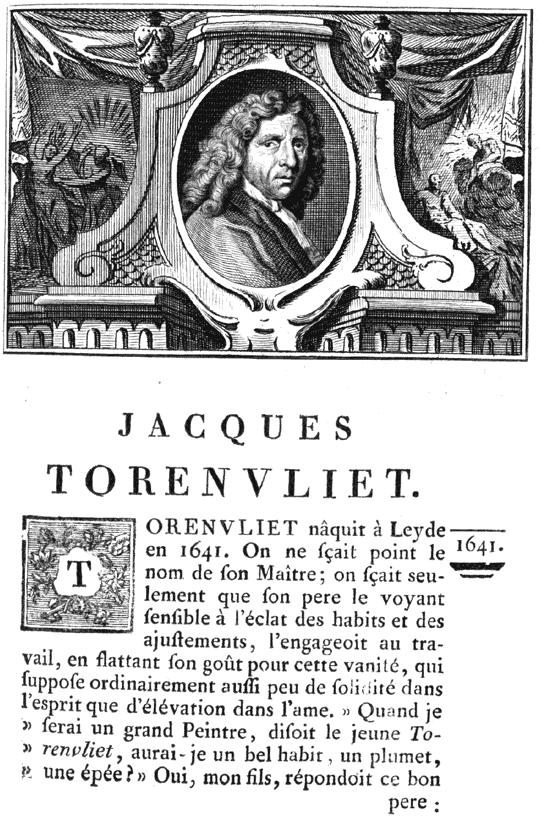
Jacob Toorenvliet

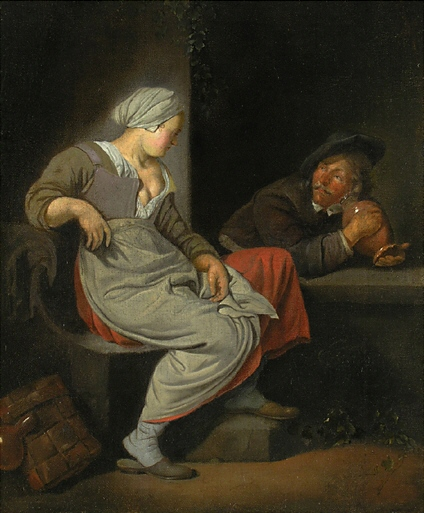
Trinkender Bauer und Magd

Jacob Toorenvliet (1640–1719) was a Dutch Golden Age painter of genre works.

== Biography ==
Toorenvliet was born in Leiden, to Abraham Toorenvliet (1620–1692), a glass painter and drawing instructor. The younger Toorenvliet first studied art with Frans van Mieris the Elder and Matthijs Naiveu, who were also studying with his father, a respected drawing teacher. Later, like his fellow students, he studied with Gerrit Dou, his father's brother-in-law, until 1659, when he started on his Grand Tour.

Torenvliet was active in a number of different cities throughout his career, mainly in Italy and the Netherlands. He was in Vienna in 1663, and in Rome for a portrait commission in 1669. His companion on this trip was Nicolaas Roosendael, a painter from Enkhuizen. From 1670 to 1673 they lived in Venice, making another trip to Rome in 1671, where Torenvliet became a member of the Bentvueghels with the bent name of Jazon. He went to Vienna again in 1673, staying until 1674, and mainly painted figures on copper. He was in Leiden again in 1679, Amsterdam in 1680, and back in Leiden in 1686, where he remained. He joined the Guild of Saint Luke in Leiden, and held a number of senior offices in it from 1695 to 1712, in addition to cofounding the Leiden Drawing Academy in 1694 with Willem van Mieris and Carel de Moor. He died in Oegstgeest in 1719.

== Legacy ==
He is considered to be a member of the school of Leiden fine painting called fijnschilderij of his teacher Dou, and was one of its last representatives after the deaths of Dou in 1675 and Dou's other celebrated pupil Frans van Mieris the Elder in 1681.
