= Galeazzo Gualdo Priorato =

Italian soldier and historian

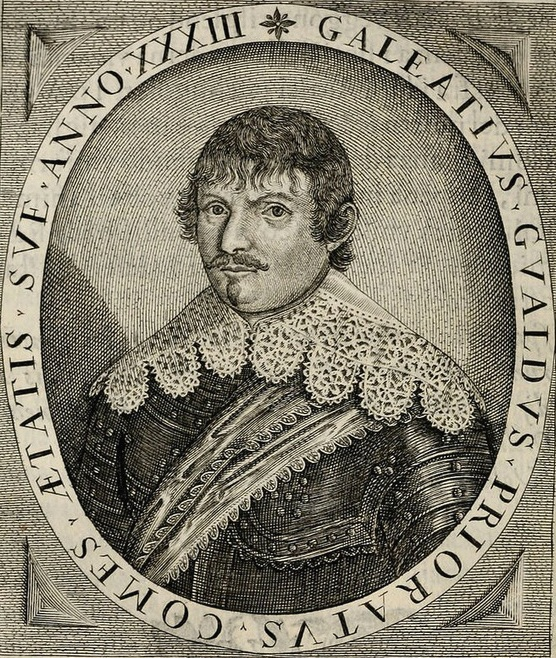
- Galeazzo Gualdo Priorato
- Born: July 23, 1606; Vicenza, Republic of Venice
- Died: 1678 (aged 71–72); Vicenza, Republic of Venice
- Occupations: Officer, diplomat, historian
- Spouse: Maria Cogolo
- Children: 4
- Parent(s): Niccolò Gualdo Priorato and Antonia Gualdo Priorato (née Roma)
- Military career
- Rank: colonel
- Conflicts: Thirty Years War; Siege of Breda; Battle of Dessau Bridge; Battle of Nördlingen; Huguenot rebellions; Siege of La Rochelle; Ottoman–Venetian wars; Cretan War (1645–1669)

Galeazzo Gualdo Priorato, Count of Comazzo (23 July 1606 – 1678), was an Italian soldier, scholar and historian.

== Biography ==
Galeazzo Gualdo Priorato was born in Vicenza, in the Republic of Venice, on 23 July 1606. He followed his father into a military career at an early age. Gualdo Priorato served with Maurice, Prince of Orange, against the Spaniards, with d'Hauterive at La Rochelle, with Count Mansfeld, with Wallenstein and the Imperial Army, and finally with the Elector of Bavaria at the head of a Venetian regiment which was destroyed at the battle of Nördlingen. In later years he attached himself to the entourage of Cardinal Mazarin, becoming a naturalized French subject. In 1657, he passed into the service of Queen Christina of Sweden. Priorato left Christina's retinue to work for emperor Leopold I and subsequently received the title of imperial councillor and court historiographer. He participated in the meetings of Empress Eleonora's academy and acted as a link between it and Queen Christina. Gualdo Priorato retired eventually to Vicenza, his home town, where he prepared his works for publication. He died in Vicenza in 1678 and was buried in the family tomb in the church of S. Lorenzo.

In the fourteen years spent outside of Italy Gualdo Priorato gained a wealth of political and military experience, which was to his advantage to write his many historical works. His record as historian includes an account of the military actions between the Spanish and Austrian Habsburgs and Gustavus Adolphus, a history of the Fronde and another of Cardinal Mazarin's ministry (commissioned by the latter in 1652), biographies of Louis XIV and Queen Christina and books on contemporary warfare. He also wrote a history of the reign of Ferdinand III. Gualdo Priorato was the author of the first biography of Wallenstein, Historia della vita d'Alberto Valstain duca di Fritland (Lyon, 1643). Translated into Latin by Josua Arnd (1626-87), Priorato's life of Wallenstein is still one of the main near contemporary sources to the life and fate of the imperial generalissimo. Gualdo Priorato was one of the most observant narrators of the events, which took place in Germany after 1618. He not only gave the reader important information about the course of the military operations during the crucial years of the Thirty Years' War but he succeeded in describing, with great intensity, the story and the actions of the main protagonists of these events, including Gustavus Adolphus of Sweden and Wallenstein. His literary style is not affected by the flamboyance of the high Baroque era and stands out for its candour and directness. A prolific and learned author, with political but also literary ambitions, Priorato was a prominent member of the Venetian Accademia degli Incogniti. Several of Priorato's works were translated into English.

== English translations ==
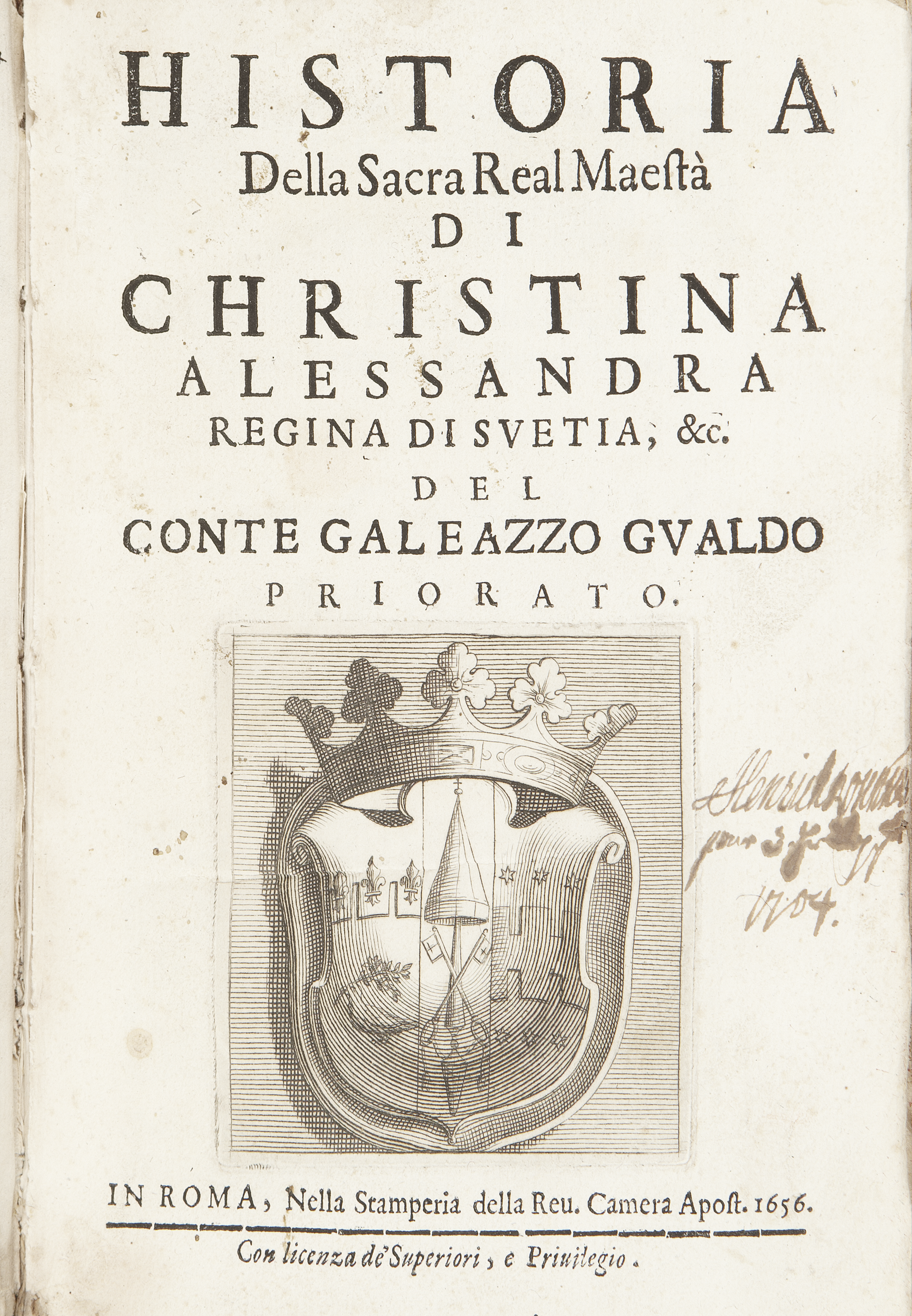
Historia della sacra real maestà di Christina Alessandra regina di Svetia. In Roma, nella stamperia della reu. Camera Apost. 1656

- An history of the late Warres and other state affaires of the best part of Christendom beginning with the King of Swethlands entrance into Germany, and continuing in the yeare 1640, written in Italian by the Count Galliazzo Gualdo Priorato and in English by the Right Honourable Henry Earle of Monmouth, London, Printed by W. Wilson, And are to be sold by John Hardesty, Thomas Huntington, and Thomas Jackson, at their shops in Ducklane, 1648.
- The history of France written in Italian by the Count Gualdo Priorato, containing all the memorable actions in France and other neighbouring, kingdoms; the translation whereof being begun by the Right Honourable Henry, late Earl of Monmouth, was finished by William Brent, Esq. London, Printed for William Place [and 3 others], 1676.
- The history of the Sacred and Royal Majesty of Christina Alessandra, Queen of Swedland with the reasons of her late conversion to the Roman Catholique religion, as also a relation of the severall entertainments given her by divers princes in her journey to Rome, with her magnificent reception into that city, London, Printed for T.W. and are to be sold at the signe of the Bell in St. Pauls Church-yard, 1658.
- The history of the managements of Cardinal Julio Mazarine, chief minister of state of the Crown of France written in Italian by Count Galeazzo Gualdo Priorato, and translated according to the original, in the which are related the principal successes happened from the beginning of his management of affairs till bis death, London, Printed by H[enry] L[loyd] and R[obert] B[attersby], 1671. Pt. 2: London, Printed by H[enry] Lloyd for George Calvert and Sam. Sprint and Christopher Wilkinson, 1672; pt. 3: London, Printed by H.L. and are to be sold by Geo. Calvert, 1673.
- The history of the managements of Cardinal Julio Mazarine, chief minister of state of the crown of France, in three parts. In the which are related the principal affairs from the infancy of this present King Lewis the 14th, London, Printed and are to be sold by S. Keble and Daniel Brown, 1691.
