= Teniers =

Teniers is a Dutch language surname. It may refer to:

- Abraham Teniers (1629–1670), Flemish painter
- David Teniers the Elder (1582–1649), Flemish painter
- David Teniers the Younger (1610–1690), Flemish painter
- David Teniers III (1638–1685), Flemish painter
- Joannes Chrysostomus Teniers, Abbot in Antwerp.
- Juliaen Teniers the Elder (1572–1615), Flemish painter
