= The Story of Caesar and Cleopatra =

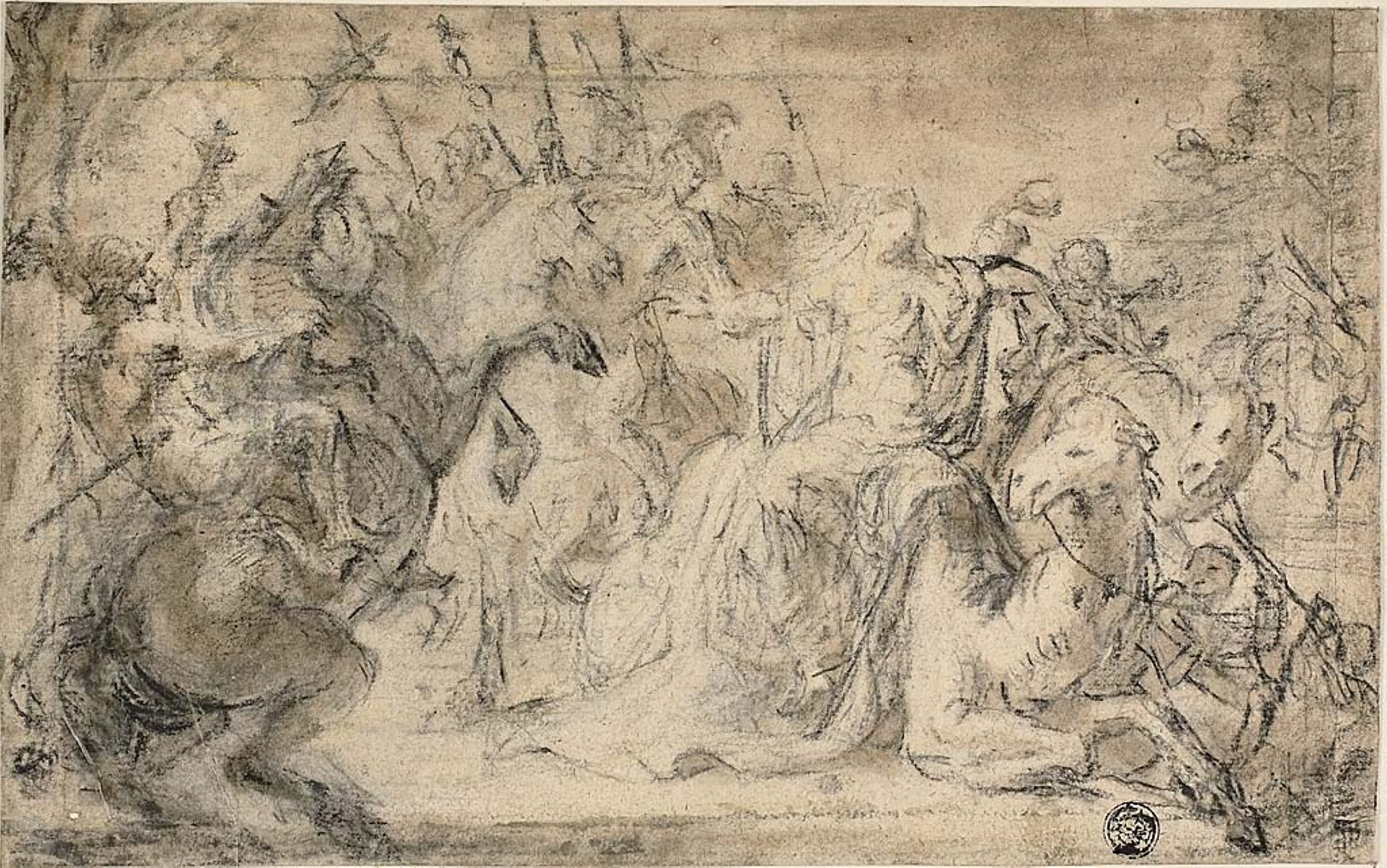
Sketch for the Zenobia Surrounded by Soldiers tapestry by Justus van Egmont, c. 1664.

The Story of Caesar and Cleopatra is an amalgamation of fourteen tapestries put together by the Art Institute of Chicago from three separate tapestry series in their collection. The original tapestry series' were the Story of Caesar Augustus, the Story of Cleopatra, sometimes referred to as the Story of Cleopatra and Antony, and the Story of Zenobia and Aurelian, all designed by Justus van Egmont in the 17th century. The tapestries were made in the Flemish High Baroque style. They were produced by some of the leading weaving workshops of the time and were commercially successful.

== Justus van Egmont ==
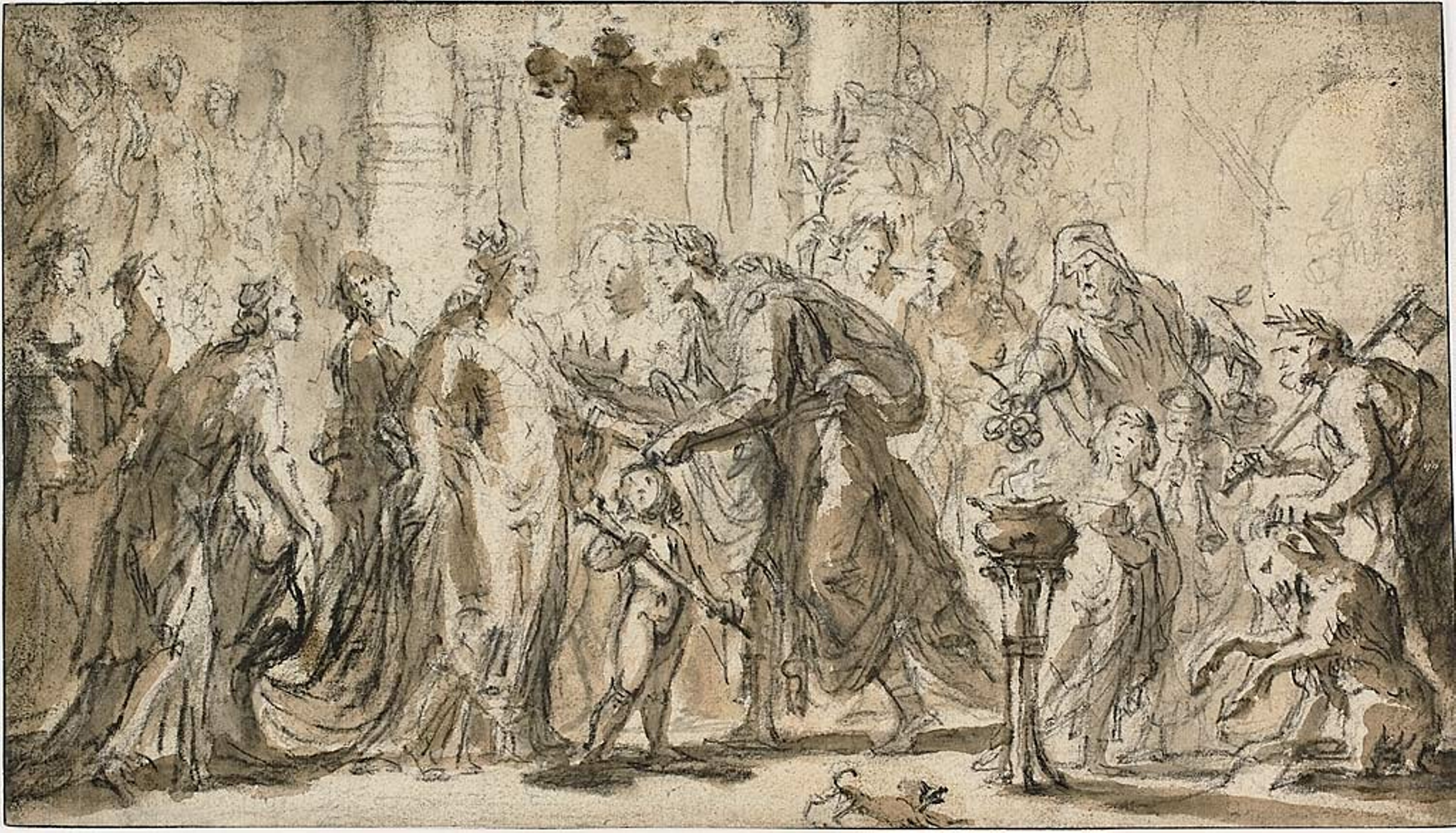
Sketch for The Marriage of Zenobia and Odenatus tapestry by Justus van Egmont, c. 1664.

Justus van Egmont designed all the tapestries in the series. He was primarily a painter born in Leiden in 1601. He trained in Antwerp under Gasper van der Hoecke. He then worked under Antony van Dyck, before moving to the workshop of Peter Paul Rubens. While in Ruben's workshop van Egmont assisted with the Life of Marie de' Medici.

In 1628 he became a master of the Antwerp Guild of St. Luke. Later that year he moved to Paris where he became a portrait painter for the House of Orleans. In 1648 he helped to found the Académie de peinture et de sculpture.

It was after returning to Antwerp around 1650 that he began to work on his own tapestry designs for the Van Leefdael-Van der Strecken-Peemans association.

== Original Tapestry Series ==
The Story of Caesar and Cleopatra consists of fourteen tapestry designs taken from three different tapestry series:

The Story of Caesar, designed by van Egmont between 1651 and March 1659. Eight designs have been attributed to this series. Caesar was one of the Nine Worthies; historical figures who embodied the ideals of chivalry. Caesar was also the subject of several popular plays including Shakespeare's Julius Caesar, published in 1623. Given the popularity of the subject, it was not a risk to create a tapestry series based on Caesar's life.

The Story of Cleopatra (also sometimes referred to as the Story of Cleopatra and Antony), designed between 1649 and 1651 after van Egmont's return from France. The series has nine designs linked to it, identified by their inscriptions. They were most likely commissioned by Jan van Leefdael and Gerard van der Streekan, and all the tapestries bear their, or their successors, signatures. Cleopatra was a common tapestry subject as the Life of Antony in Plutarch's Parallel Lives had been translated and popularized in the 16th century.

The Story of Zenobia and Aurelian, designed from 1664 to 1665. There are eight designs linked to this series, commissioned by the workshop of Gerard Peemans. Zenobia was the queen of Palmyra and claimed to be descended from Cleopatra and Mark Antony. She went on a campaign of conquest but was defeated by Aurelian, a Roman emperor. Zenobia was a well liked historical figure in the 17th century, and was the subject of several popular books. Multiple tapestry series telling her story were produced in Brussels and Antwerp.

== The Story of Caesar and Cleopatra tapestries ==
Many of the tapestries in the original series were repeated compositions, with different captions to designate them as different scenes. The tapestries were commissioned and produced by several of the leading weaving workshops of the time, such as the Van Leefdael-Van der Strecken-Peemans association. The series were commercially successfully, as evidenced by the multiple editions that were produced.

The subject matter of the tapestries demonstrates the interest in female historical figures during the 17th century. The tapestries were designed in the Flemish High Baroque style. They display signature characteristics of the style such as expressive facial expressions, monumental figures, and dramatic poses. Some of the borders on the tapestries are also identical to the borders in Peter Paul Ruben's tapestry series The Story of Constantine.

Tapestry	Workshop	Description
Clodius Disguised as a Woman	Workshop of Gerard Peemans Brussels, c. 1680	Clodius disguised himself as a female flute player to gain access to Caesar's wife, Pompeia, who he desired.
Caesar in the Gallic Wars	Workshop of Willem van Leefdael Brussels, c. 1680	A battle from Julius Caesar's conquest of Gaul is pictured.
Caesar Defeats the Troops of Pompey	Workshop of Gerard Peemans Brussels, c. 1680	This scene is most likely meant to portray the battle of Pharsalus, which was the decisive victory in Caesar's civil war with Pompey.
Caesar Sends a Messenger to Cleopatra	Workshop of Willem van Leefdael Brussels, c. 1680	After Pompey flees to Egypt, Pharaoh Ptolemy XIII, who was fighting a civil war with his sister Cleopatra, has Pompey killed. This offends Caesar who then seeks an alliance with Cleopatra. Here she is receiving his first messenger, beginning their love affair. This design is also sometimes labeled as Cleopatra Asked to Pay Tribute to Rome.
Cleopatra Asked to Pay Tribute to Rome	Workshop of Gerard Peemans Brussels, c. 1680	No event like the scene described was ever recorded, it is possible that the title was given to a design from a different series in order to expand The Story of Cleopatra.
Discovery of the Plot to Kill Caesar and Cleopatra.	Workshop of Gerard Peemans Brussels, c. 1680	Supporters of Cleopatra's late brother, Pharoh Ptolemy XIII, plot to kill Caesar and Cleopatra. However, Caesar's barber discovers the plan and the assailants are caught.
Caesar Embarks by Boat to Join His Army	Workshop of Gerard Peemans Brussels, c. 1680	This is a scene from during the Egyptian Civil War. After the attempt on Caesar's and Cleopatra's lives, they find themselves pursued by the Egyptian army and Caesar flees by boat.
Caesar Throws Himself into the Sea	Workshop of Willem van Leefdael Brussels, c. 1680	While they are fleeing from Alexandria Caesar's boat becomes overrun with enemies but he manages to escape by jumping into the sea and swimming to land.
Caesar and Cleopatra Enjoying Themselves	Workshop of Gerard Peemans Brussels, c. 1680	This seems to be another tapestry where the description does not match the design. It may be a design from a different series.
The Triumph of Caesar	Workshop of Gerard Peemans Brussels, c. 1680	This scene shows Caesar celebrating his triumph after his African campaign.
Caesar's Death Makes Cleopatra Mourn	Workshop of Gerard Peemans Brussels, c. 1680	This design was used for both Caesar's Death Makes Cleopatra Mourn and The Death of Cleopatra. In the Death of Cleopatra, a snake is wrapped around her right arm. In this scene Cleopatra mourns after hearing the news of Caesar's death.
Cleopatra Enjoys Herself at Sea	Workshop of Willem van Leefdael Brussels, c. 1680	This tapestry is part of the design for another tapestry The Meeting of Cleopatra and Antony. In the full design, Antony is shown riding a horse to the left of the boat. In this scene Cleopatra can still be seen gazing towards where he would be.
Cleopatra and Antony Enjoying Supper	Workshop of Gerard Peemans Brussels, c. 1680	Sometimes titled Cleopatra Dissolving a Pearl. This scene depicts a lavish dinner that Cleopatra threw to impress Marc Antony. At the end of the meal, Cleopatra dropped a pearl into a cup of vinegar and drank it.
The Battle of Actium	Workshop of Willem van Leefdael Brussels, c. 1680	This scene depicts the Battle of Actium, which was the final battle between Marc Antony and Octavius. After his defeat, Antony committed suicide rather than be captured.
