= Justus van Egmont =

Portrait painter (1601–1674)

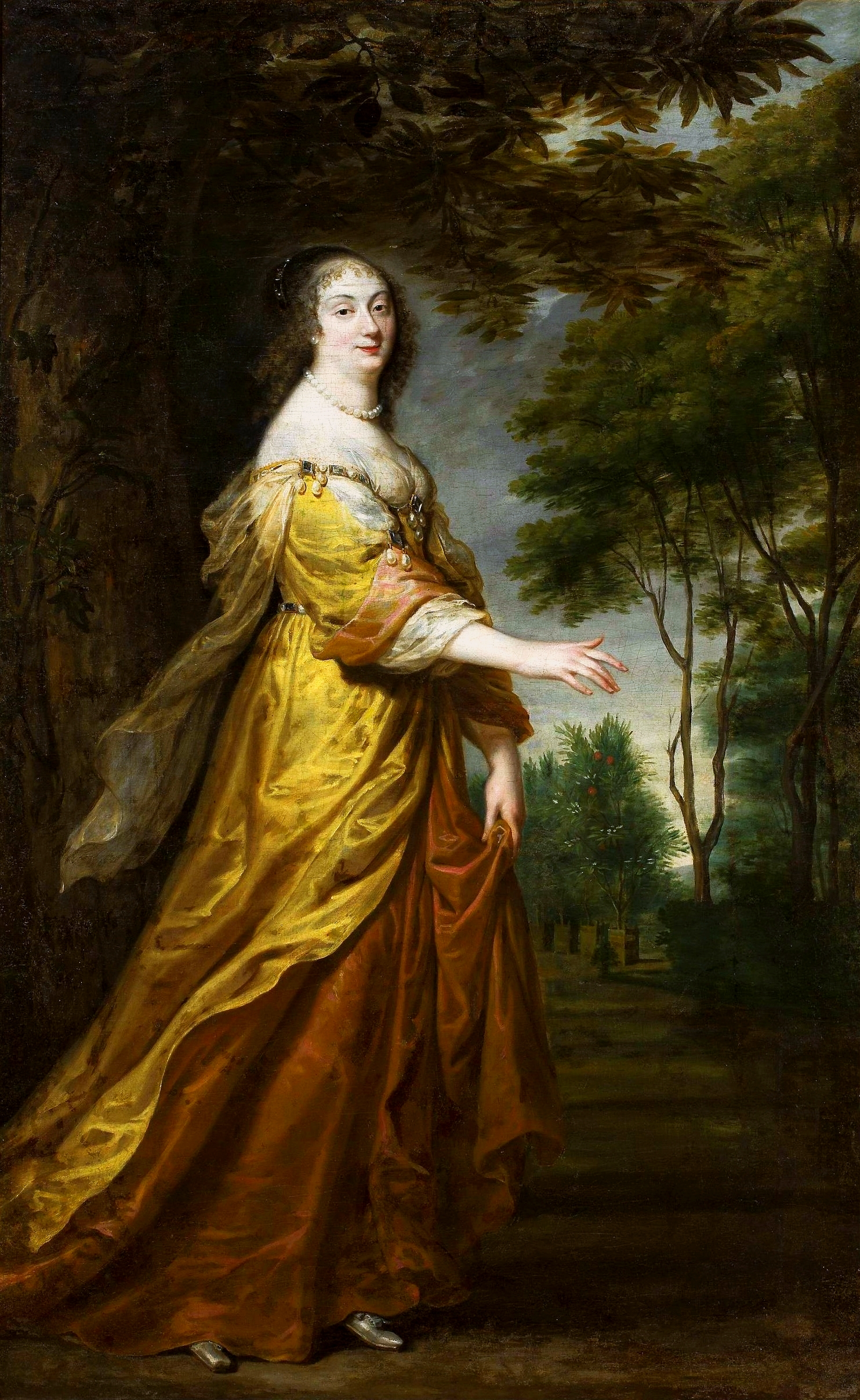
- Portrait of Queen Marie Louise Gonzaga by Justus van Egmont, 1645
- Born: 1601; Leiden
- Died: 1674 (aged 73 or 72); Antwerp
- Resting place: St. James Church, Antwerp
- Spouse: Emerentia Bosschaert
- Elected: Member of the Guild of St. Luke

Justus van Egmont or Joost van Egmont (1601 – 8 January 1674) was a painter and a tapestry designer during the 17th century. After training in Antwerp with Gaspar van den Hoecke and working with Anthony van Dyck, van Egmont also worked in Peter Paul Rubens' workshop. He moved to France in 1628 where he was a court painter for the House of Orléans. In France he helped to found the Académie de peinture et de sculpture. He later returned to Flanders where he worked in Antwerp and Brussels. He is mainly known for his portrait paintings, although he also painted some history subjects, and produced designs for five different tapestry series.

== Biography ==
Justus van Egmont was born in Leiden as the son of Dirk Joostzone van Egmont, a carpenter, and Constantia Leenaerts. After becoming widowed his mother took her family, which included two daughters from her first marriage, back to her native Antwerp when Justus was 14 years old. In Antwerp Justus became an apprentice of the painter Gaspar van den Hoecke in 1615. Three years later, he made a will. It has traditionally been assumed that he made the will with the intention of undertaking a trip to Italy like many other artists of his day since such as trip was considered a necessary part of an artist's training. However, the absence of any evidence for such a trip to Italy and the lack of any discernible Italian influence on the style or compositions of his later work have cast some doubts as to whether he really travelled to Italy.

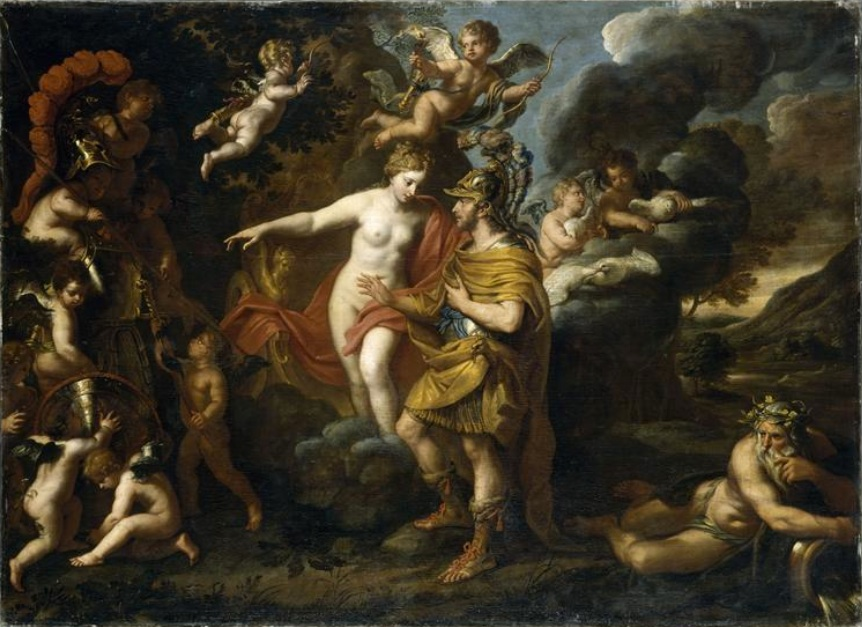
Venus gives weapons to Aeneas

Not long after he made his will, van Egmont is recorded in the circle of Anthony van Dyck as is evidenced by the fact that during a court case he stated that he had worked on a series of apostles for van Dyck.

After a stay in Italy in 1618, van Egmont returned to Antwerp and worked in the workshop of Rubens from the year 1625 (but possibly already starting from 1622) to about 1628, where he was involved in the series of paintings on The Life of Maria de Medici. He became a master of the Antwerp Guild of St. Luke in 1628. While living in Antwerp, he had a relationship with Emerentia (Emerentiana) Bosschaert who bore him three sons out of wedlock: Joost (Justus), Konstantijn (Constantine) and Theodoor (Theodore) who were born between 1623 and 1627. Their relationship was later regularized and the couple would have more children including sons Bonaventura and Philippe and daughters Prudentia, Marie and Anna Catharina. Van Egmont's children trained as painters and are believed to have worked in the workshop of their father at one time or the other. However, none of them would achieve the same level of success as their father.

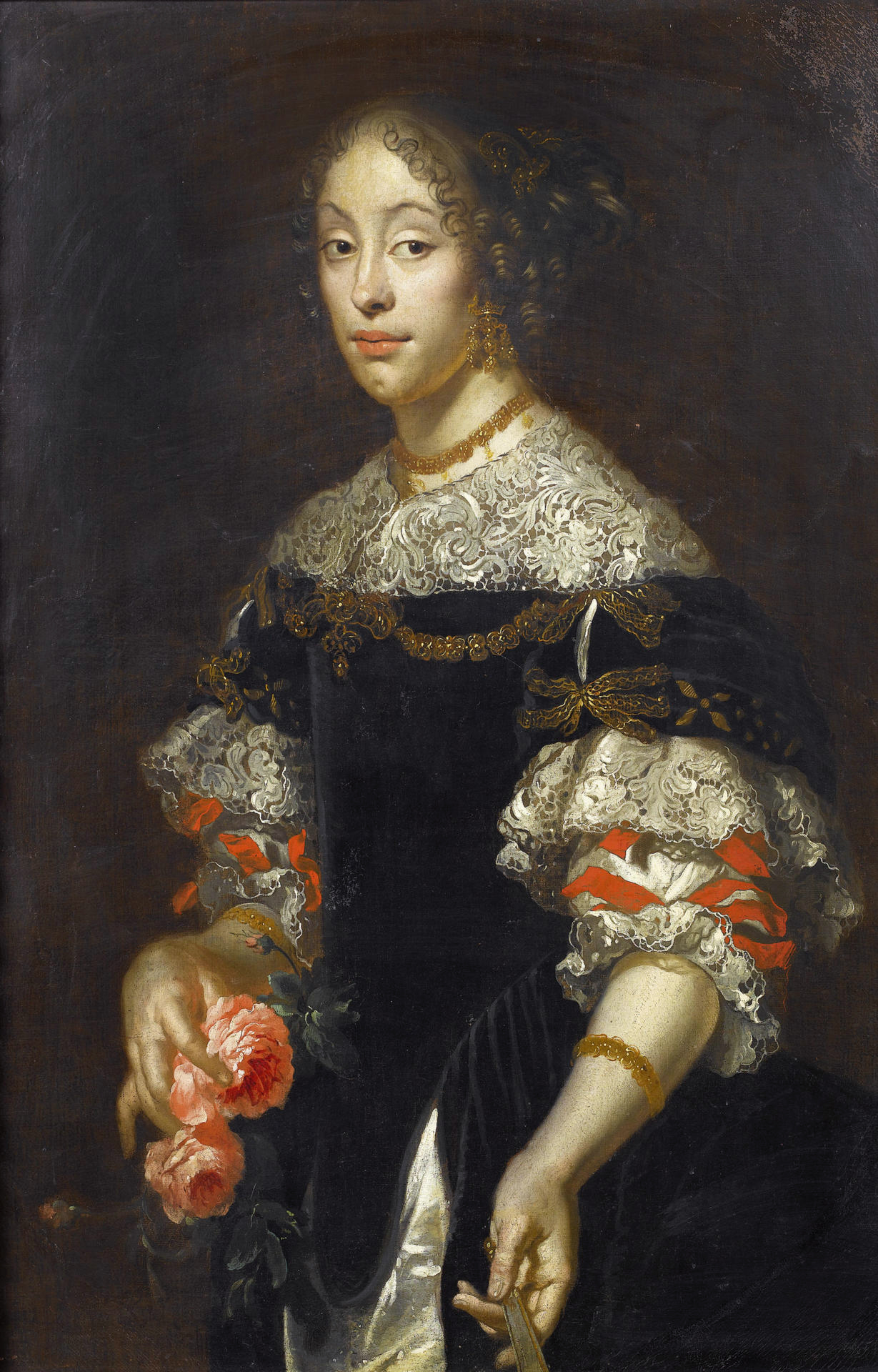
Portrait of a lady

Some time between 1628 and 1630 van Egmont moved to Paris, where he had previously helped with matters relating to the delivery of, and payment for, Rubens' The Life of Maria de Medici cycle. It is likely that Rubens had introduced van Egmont to some influential potential patrons at the French court. The first record of van Egmont in France dates to 1633 when his son Philippe was baptized in Paris.

In Paris, van Egmont established a lifelong friendship with fellow Flemish painter Philippe de Champaigne. Van Egmont worked as a tapestry designer in the Paris workshop of Simon Vouet, one of the leading French painters of that time. Van Egmont also participated in large commissions such as the decoration of the 'Galerie des Hommes Illustres' (Gallery of Famous Men), a project at the Palais-Cardinal of Cardinal Richelieu, which de Champaigne had been contracted to undertake. Although the portraits of the famous men themselves were later destroyed, the historical scenes around the portraits painted by van Egmont have been preserved and are in the Musée des Beaux-Arts de Nantes. He is mentioned as a court painter for the House of Orléans from 1635. He was able to establish himself as a successful portrait painter for the royal family and the nobility in Paris.

He achieved commercial success in the 1640s and had a thriving business in prints for which he obtained a royal privilege. Aside from providing a steady source of income, the prints also helped to spread his reputation. In 1642 he received an important commission for the altarpiece for the Bundeskapelle in Brunnen, Switzerland.

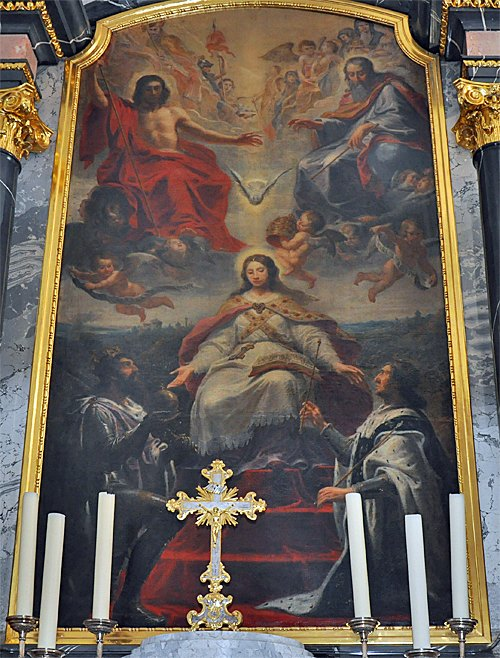
"Ecclesia", altarpiece for the Bundeskapelle in Brunnen in Switzerland - 1642

In 1648, he was one of the founders of the French Royal Academy of Painting and Sculpture and was elected as one of the original twelve elders in charge of its running.

In January 1649 he was in Brussels where he painted a Portrait of Archduke Leopold Wilhelm of Austria, then the Governor of the Spanish Netherlands and an avid art collector. The portrait is now in the collection of the Kunsthistorisches Museum, Vienna. In 1651, van Egmont's name appeared on the alliance agreement between the Académie de peinture et de sculpture and the competing Guild of St. Luke of Paris. In 1653 van Egmont returned to Antwerp with his family. He spent time in Brussels where he designed various tapestries. He also continued to paint portraits.

The artist's success allowed him to amass a fortune which he invested into real estate in Antwerp and its surrounding areas. Starting from 1650 he signed some paintings and documents with 'Justus Verus d’Egmont'. This reflected his aspiration to be recognized as an aristocrat (just like his illustrious masters van Dyck and Rubens) based on his claim to be a descendant of the famous house of Egmont. He made several applications to get his claim to a noble title officially sanctioned but it is not clear whether or not he succeeded. When he died in 1674, his social status allowed him to be buried in Antwerp's prestigious St. James' Church where Rubens was also buried. His estate included a large collection of artworks of Flemish as well as foreign artists such as Pourbus, Rubens, Salviati, Holbein, Tintoretto, Brueghel and Vredeman de Vries.

== Work ==
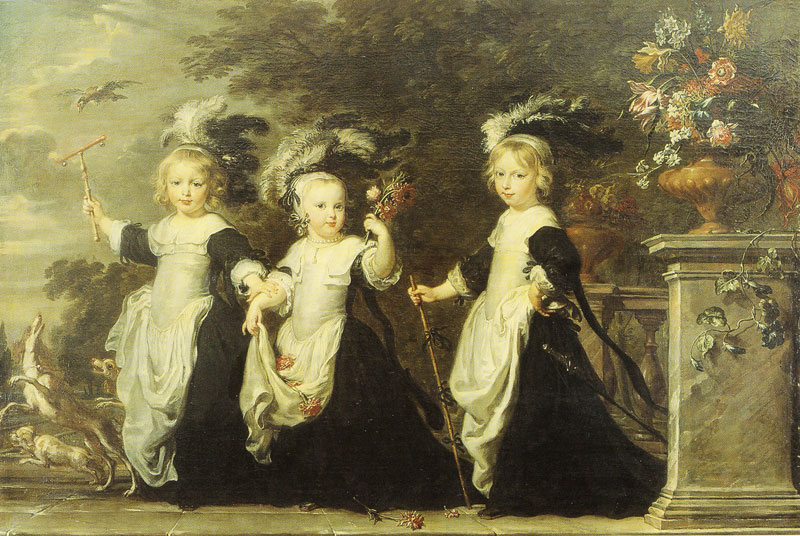
Portrait of the Goubau children, depicting Alexander IV Goubau, Lord of Mespelaere, (1658–1712) and his brother Joannes V Cornelis Goubau, (1660–1702).

Van Egmont's body of work comprises roughly eighty works, including paintings, sketches and drawings and designs for five large tapestry series.

The majority of van Egmont's work consists of portraits he painted for the French aristocracy. He also painted history paintings, in particular at the beginning of his career when he worked for Rubens and during his early days in France. Van Egmont had an accomplished technique which could achieve a maximum effect with the minimum of paint.

=== Portraits ===
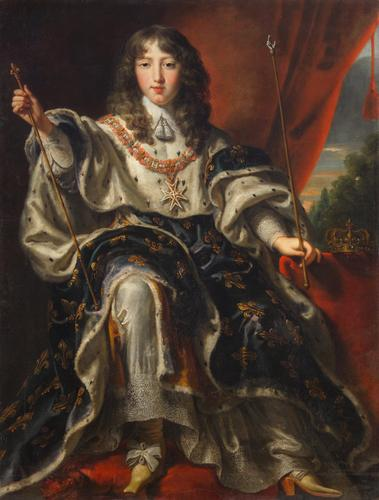
King Louis XIV of France

His early portrait paintings show the influence of van Dyck. An example is the portrait of Portrait of Marie Louise Gonzaga (1645, National Museum, Warsaw) which is very Vandyckian in the straddling position of the sitter, the gesture of her hand, the profiling of the body and the facing of the face toward the viewer. In the early 1650s he completed a series of very large portraits for Gaston, Duke of Orléans that were installed at the Palais du Luxembourg (now in the Château de Balleroy (Calvados)) and reference Rubens' style. In his later career he was able to synthesize the influences of Rubens and van Dyck as is shown in the group portrait of the three children of the Goubau family.

Van Egmont's workshop also produced many copies in paint or print of the portraits of the royal family for patrons wishing to show their loyalty to the monarchy and of other portraits for sitters who wanted to gift their portraits to friends and family. The workshop was set up along the lines of the Rubens workshop. It is believed that his sons and possibly his daughters played an important role in the production of his workshop. The quality of copies produced in the workshop was uneven and generally below that of van Egmont's autographed works.

=== Drawings ===
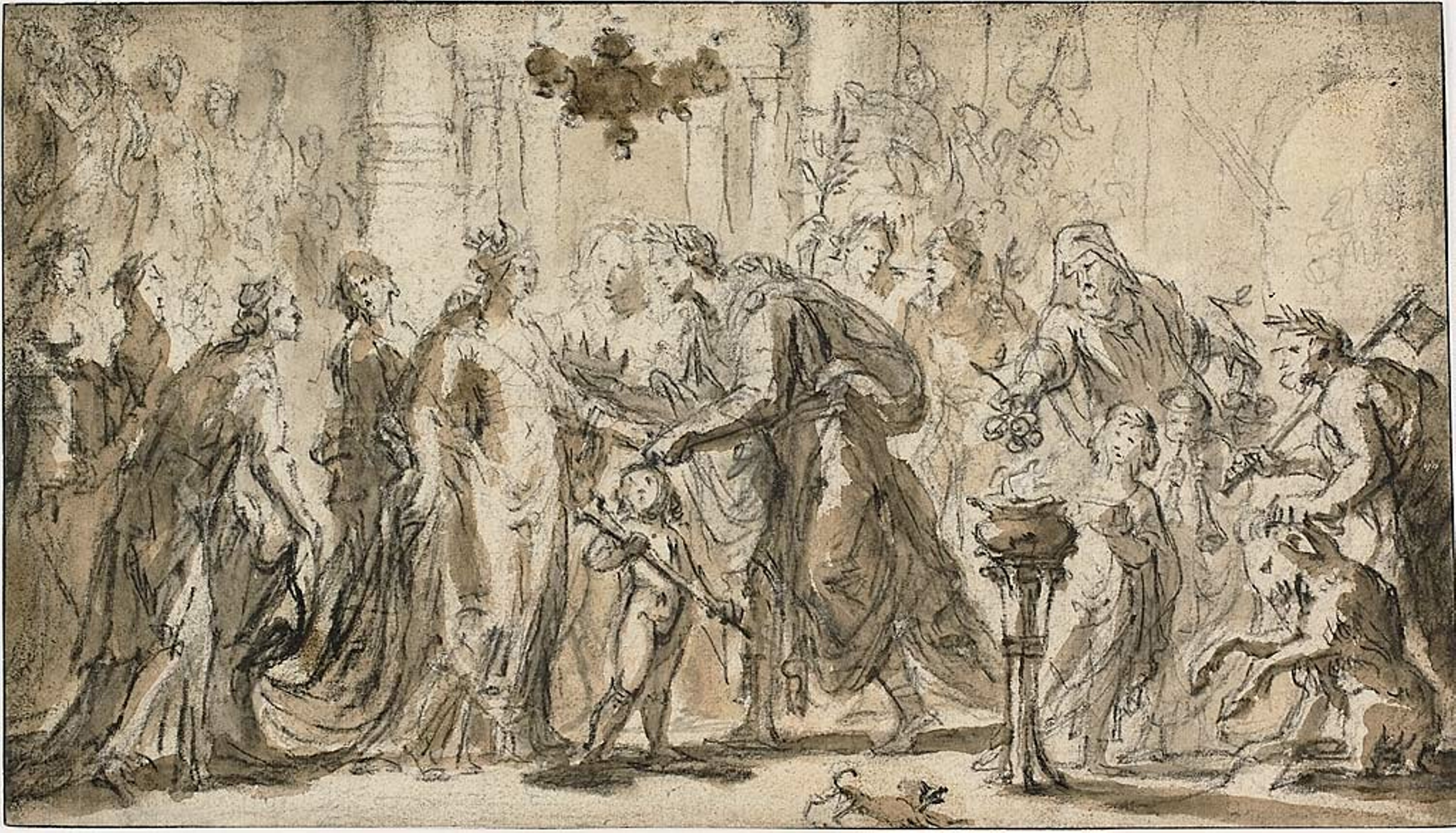
The Marriage of Zenobia and Odenatus

Van Egmont was an accomplished draughtsman whose compositions are very minimal and striking. His rough sketches are characterized by the angularity of the facial features of the figures and the use of many lines. An example is the drawing entitled The Marriage of Zenobia and Odenatus (Art Institute of Chicago), which was a preparatory drawing for the tapestry series, Life of Zenobia, Queen of Palmyra. In this sketch executed in chalk van Egmont has laid out the broad composition in quick strokes. The drawing reveals van Egmont's ability to characterize the figures in their proportions and pose with a few sure strokes. Also striking is the carefully balanced direction of the lighting, which binds the drawing style and the dynamic movement of the figures together in a spatially closed scene in which the main characters are clearly emphasized.

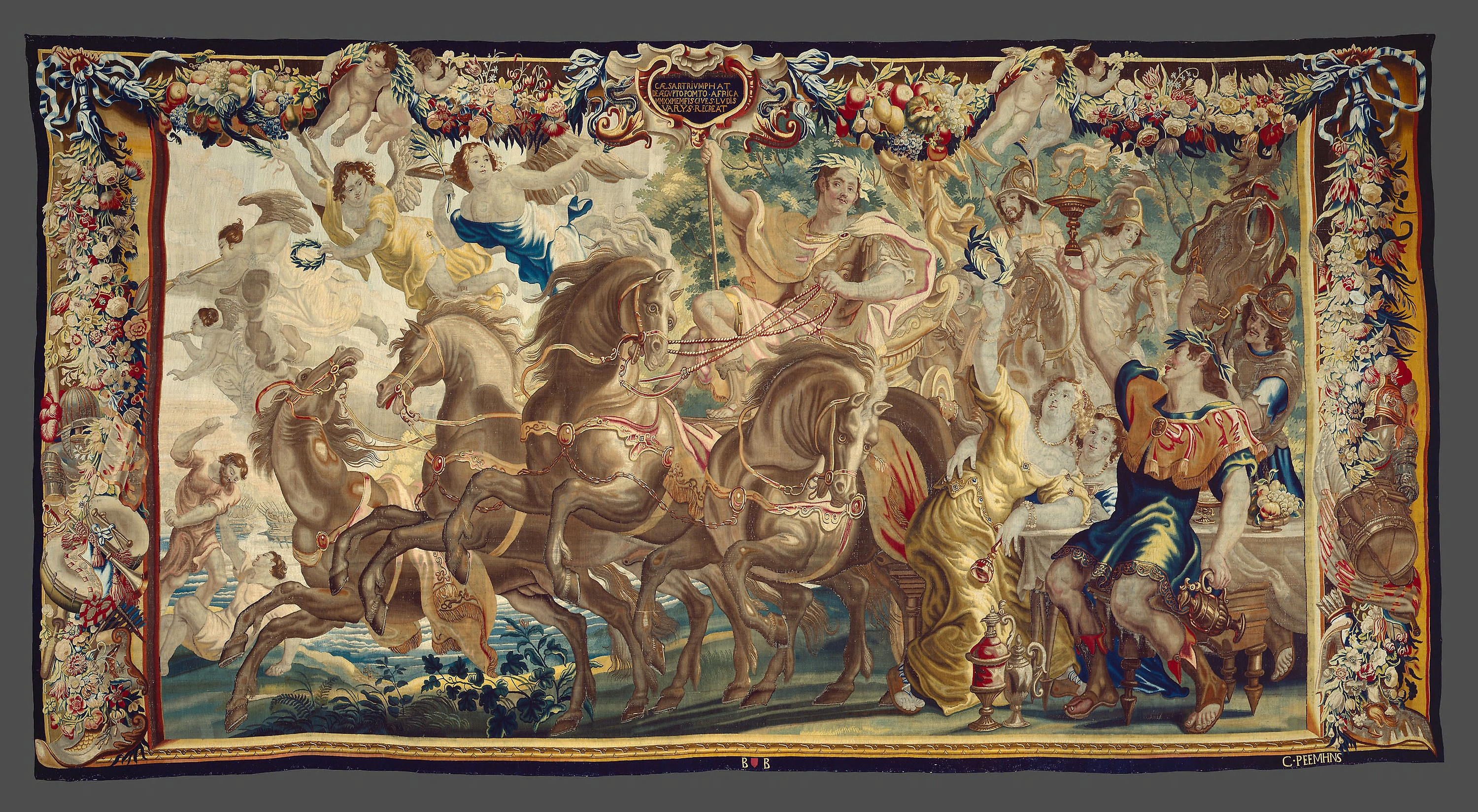
The Triumph of Caesar

=== Tapestry designs ===
Van Egmont also designed tapestries, like other Flemish painters of the period such as Rubens and Jacob Jordaens. He is known to have designed the following series: the Story of Caesar Augustus, the Story of Cleopatra or Story of Cleopatra and Antony, The Story of Caesar and Cleopatra, and the Story of Zenobia, Queen of Palmyra. The themes of these series show the contemporary interest in depictions of famous women from history.

In his tapestry designs Van Egmont showed a preference for large vertical flamboyance. They include expressive facial expressions, as well as monumental figures in dramatic poses, all recognizable elements of Flemish High Baroque. His figures are drawn with very lively lines which occasionally disrupt the integrity of the overall composition. He also often used pseudo-exotic costumes and settings. His designs were commissioned by the leading weaving workshops of his time, such as the Van Leefdael-Van der Strecken-Peemans association, and the workshop of Geraert van der Strecken. These series were commercially successfully as shown by the multiple editions produced.

== Selected works ==
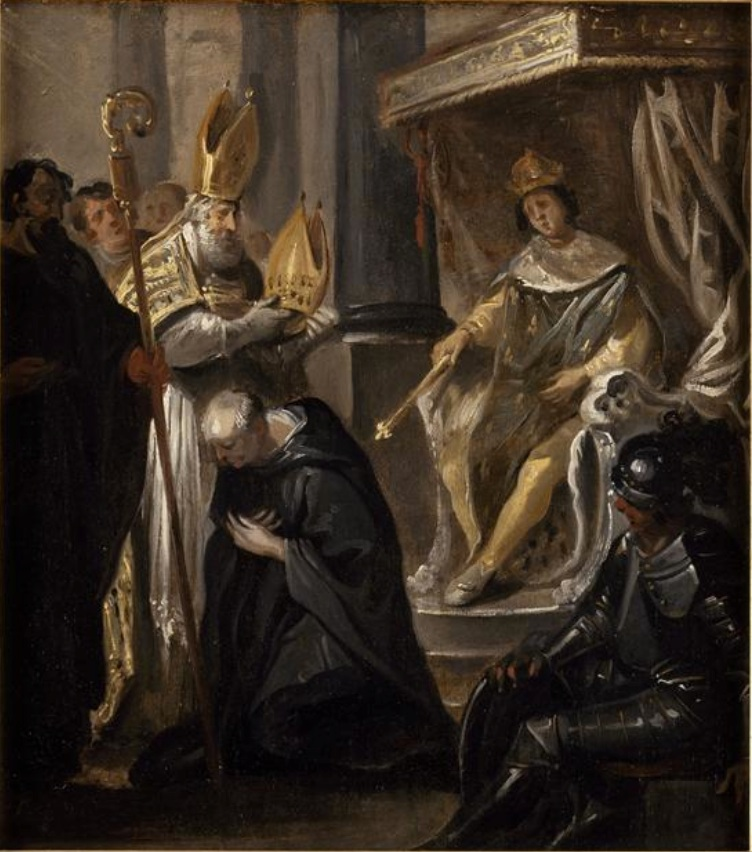
Suger is made abbot of Saint-Denis - circa 1630s

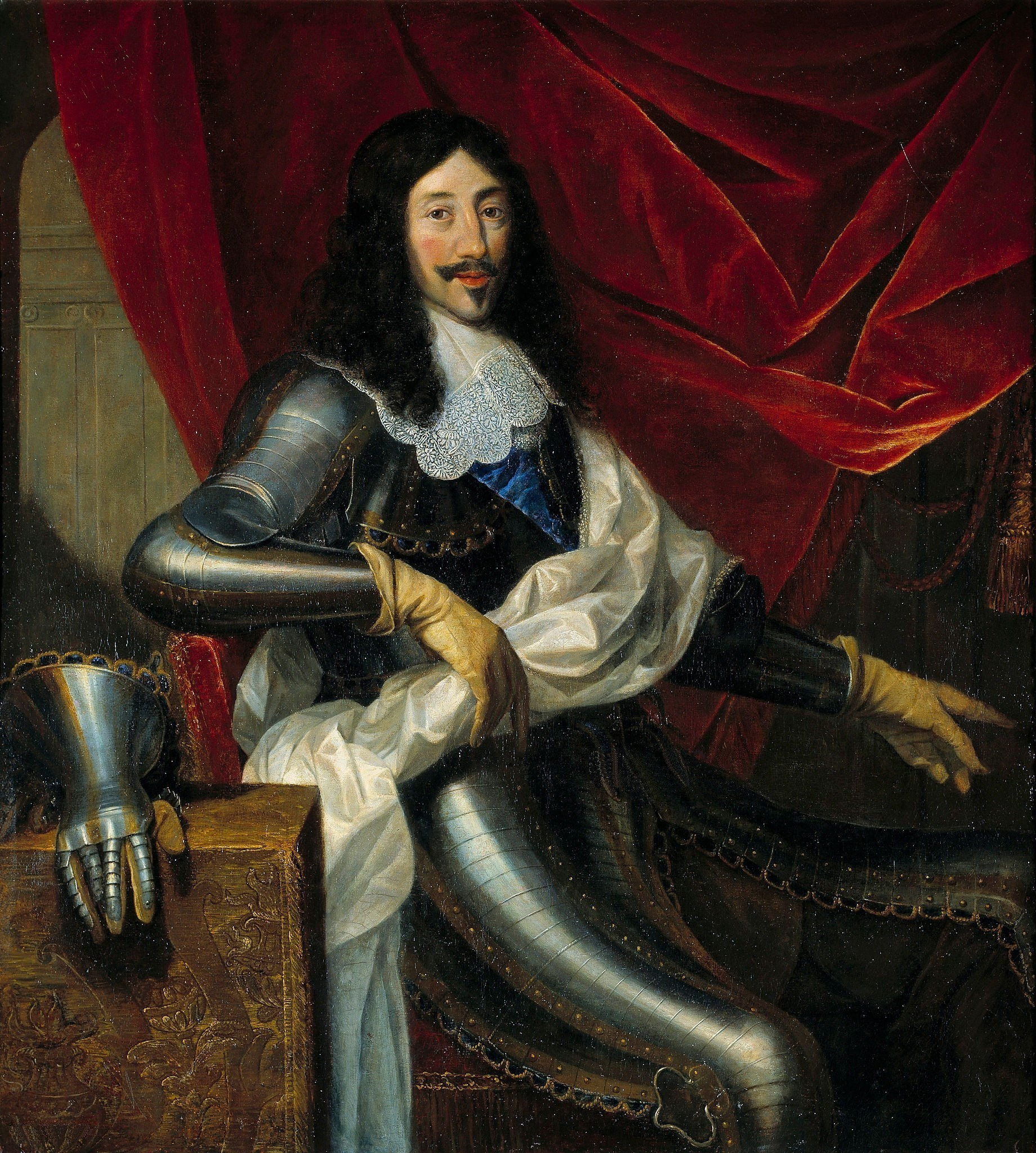
Louis XIII - before 1643

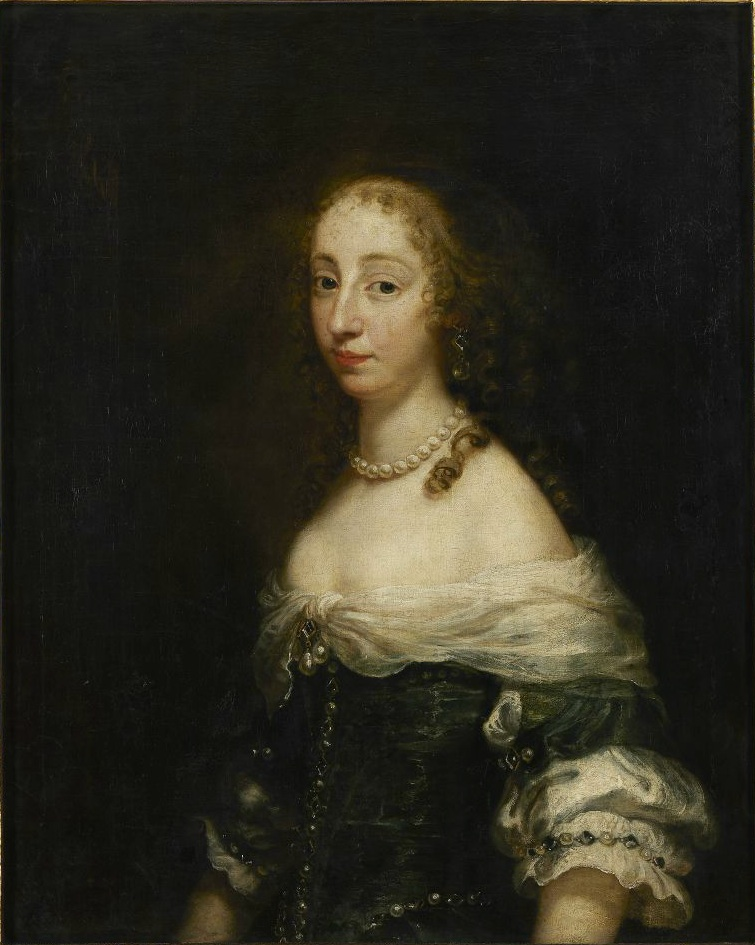
Portrait of a Lady - 1650

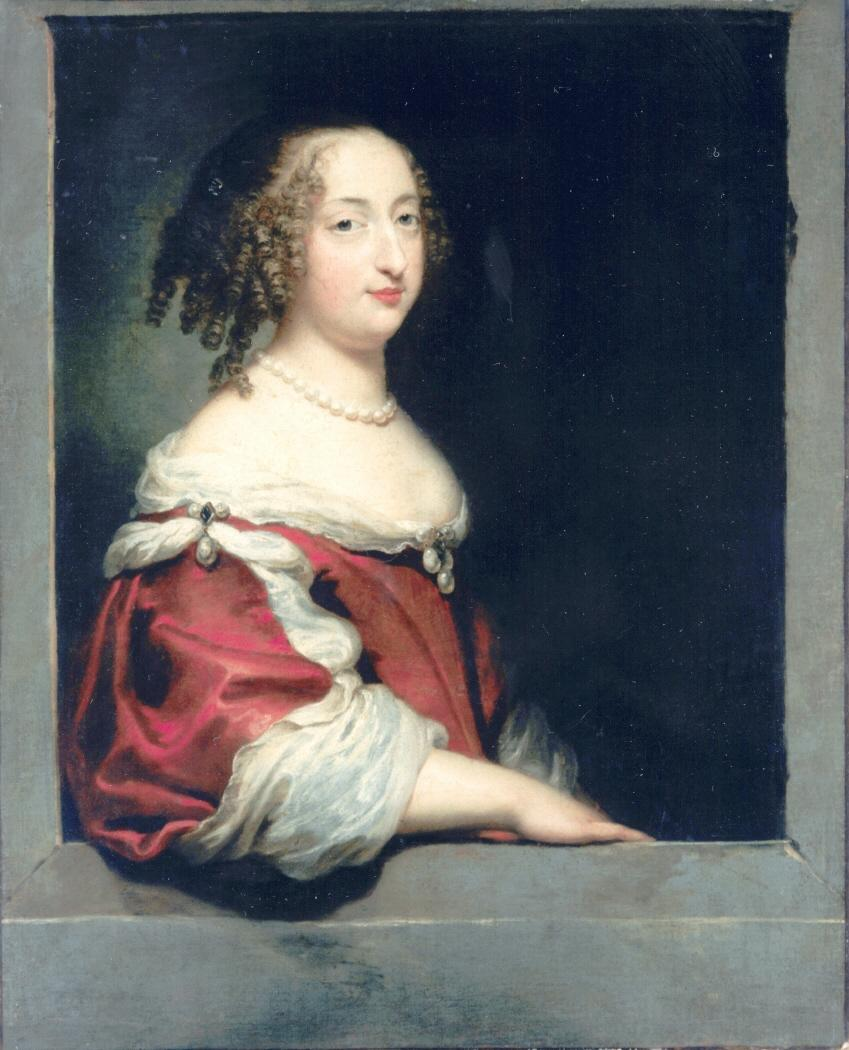
Portrait of a Woman - 1650–1655

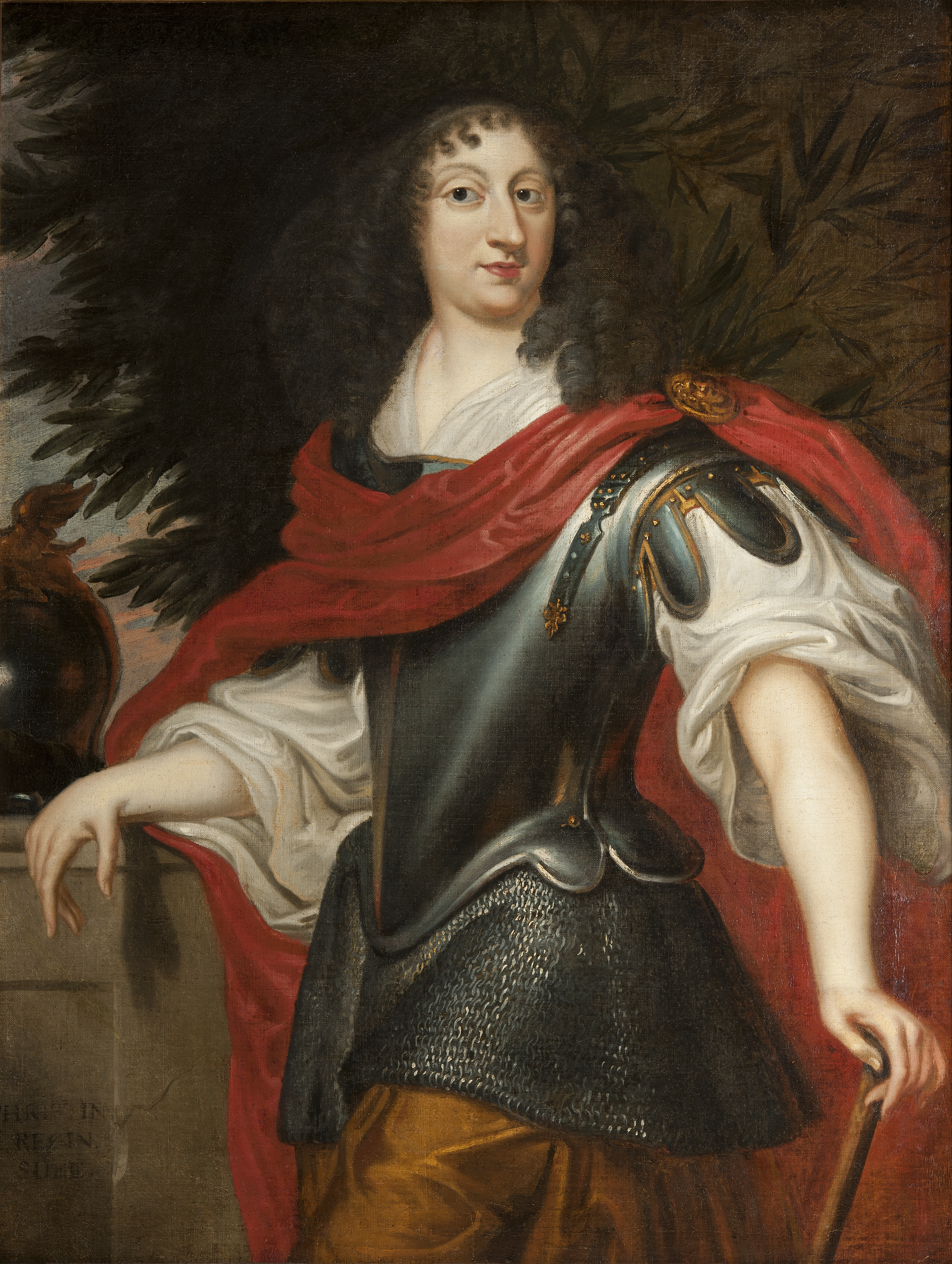
Queen Christina of Sweden as Minerva - 1654

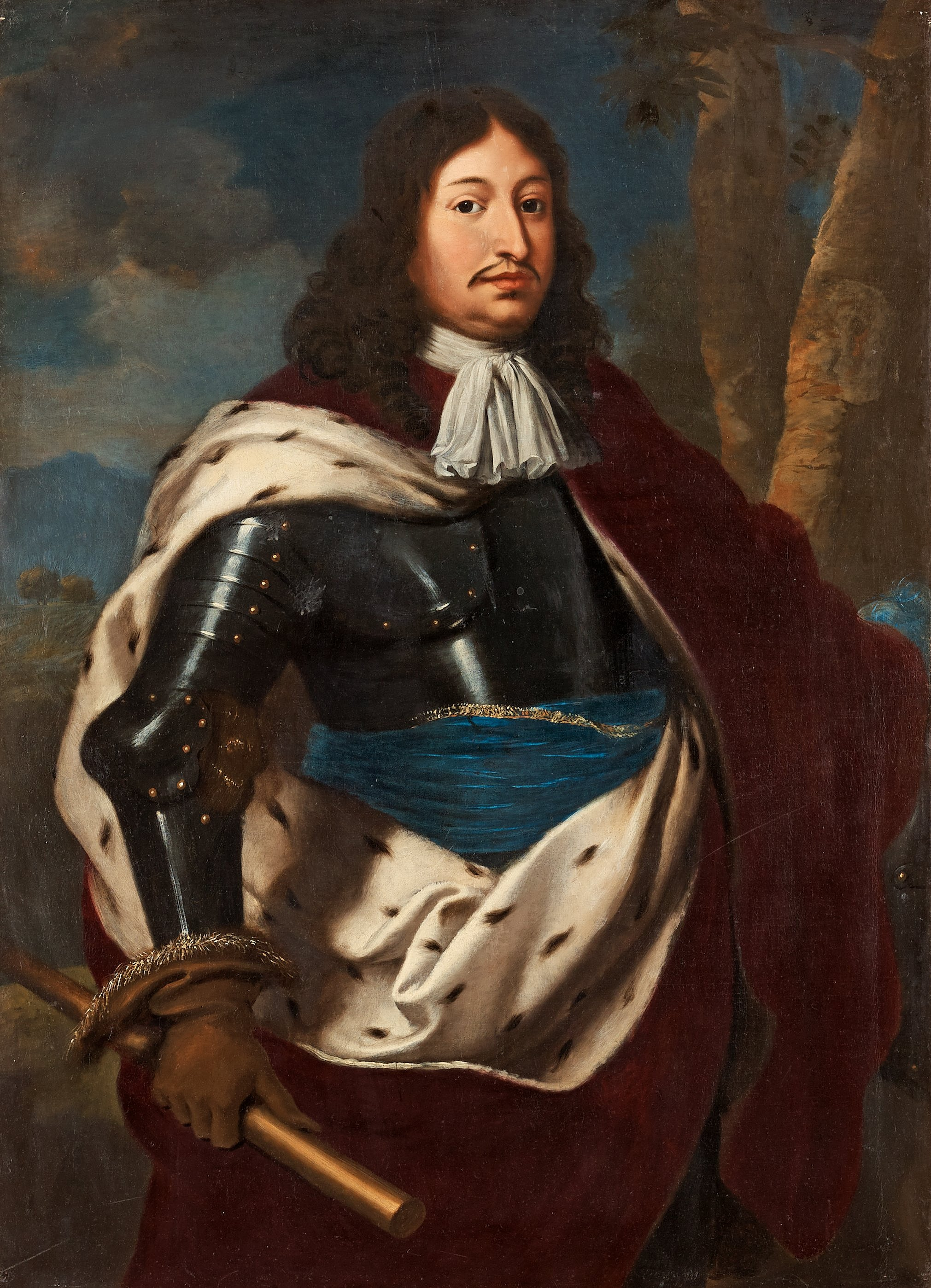
Charles X Gustav of Sweden - between 1654 and 1660

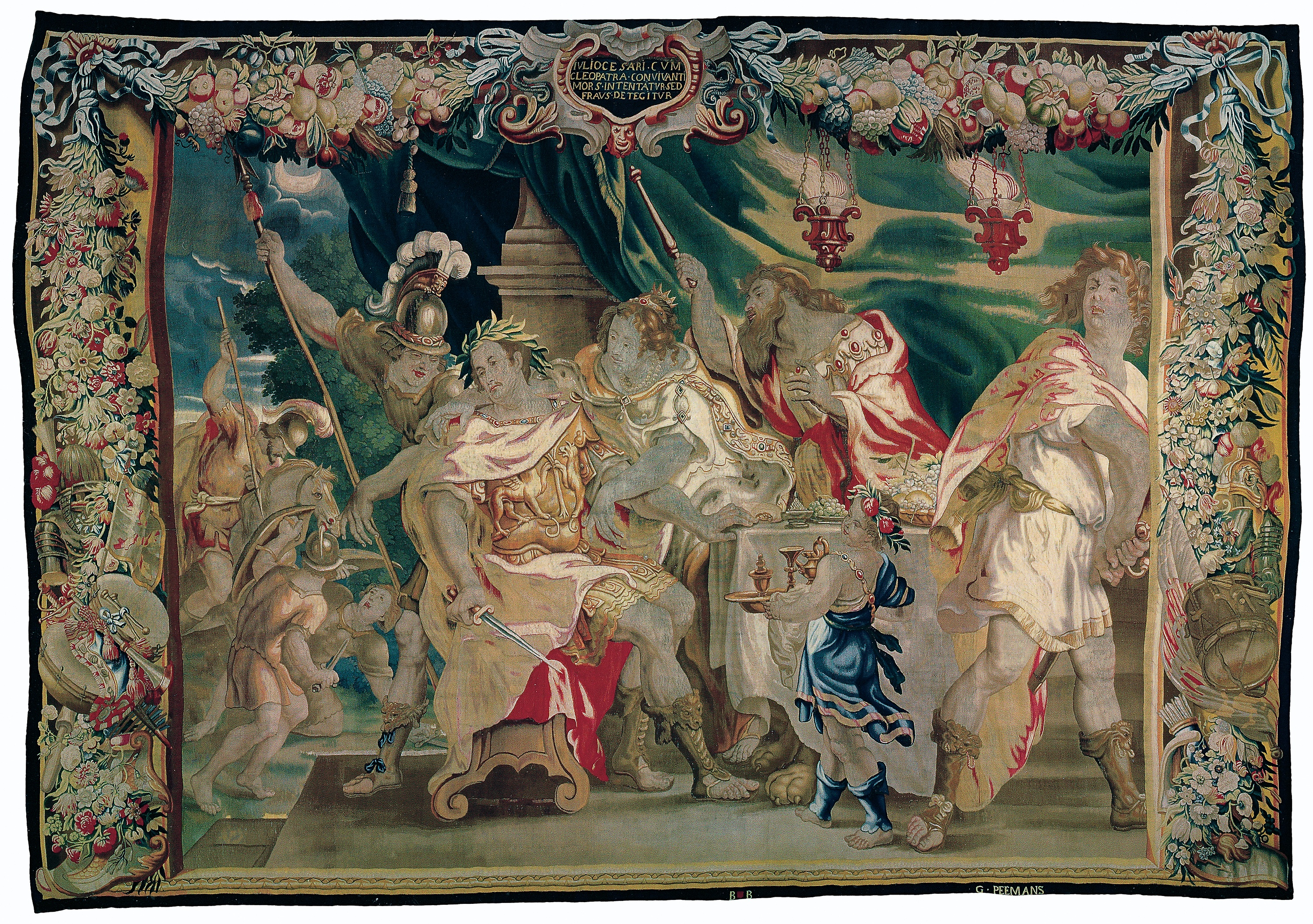
Discovery of the Plot to Kill Caesar and Cleopatra - (Woven circa 1680)

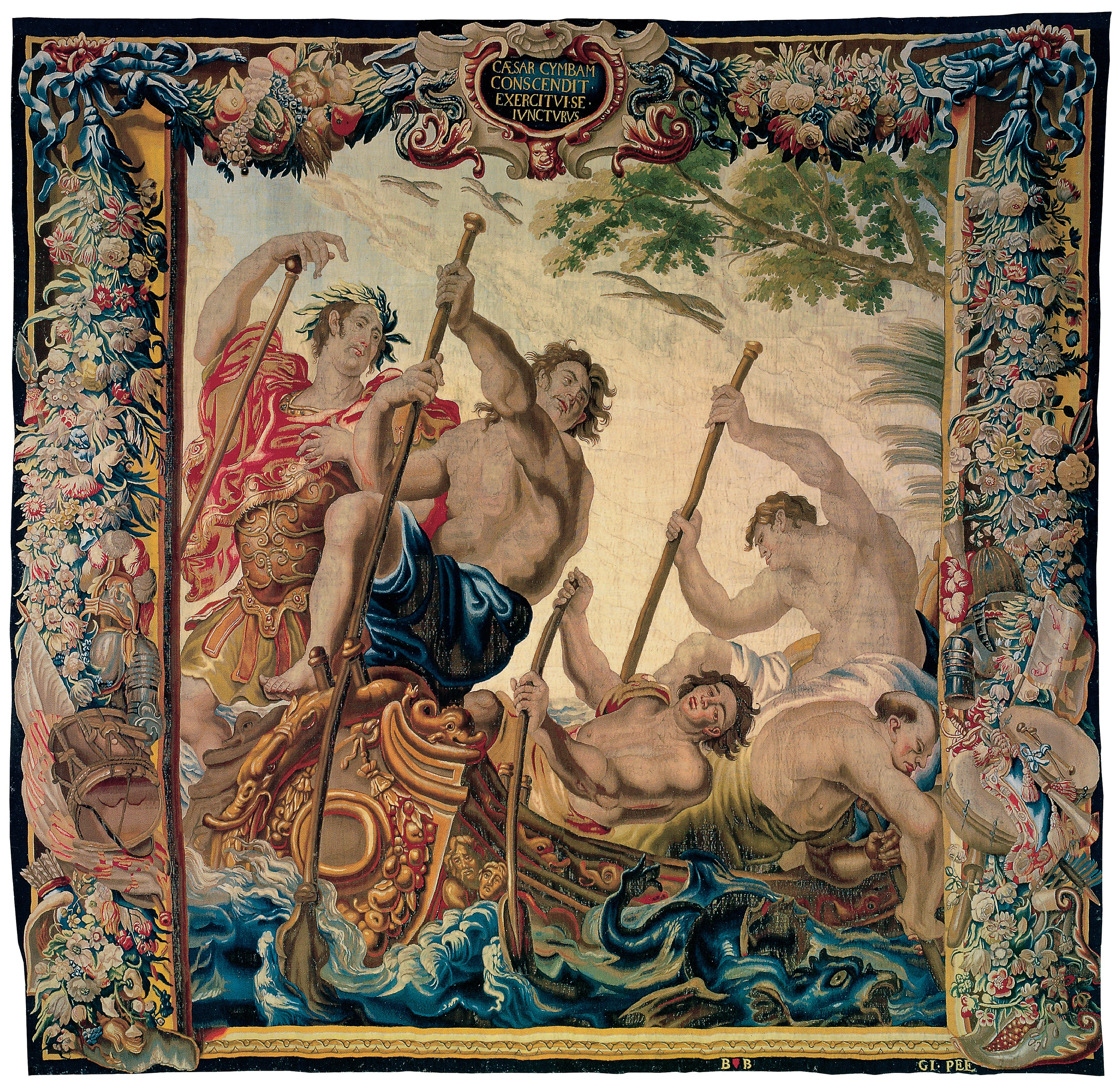
Caesar Embarks by Boat to Join His Army - (Woven circa 1680)
