= Robert van den Hoecke =

Flemish painter, engraver and architect

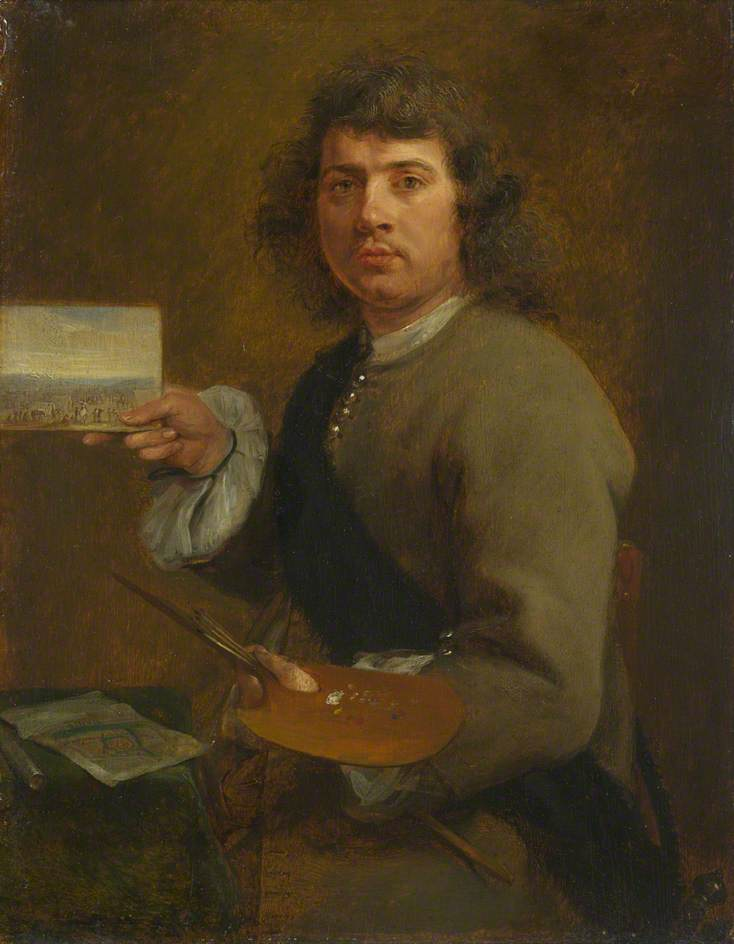
Portrait of Robert van den Hoecke by Gonzales Coques

Robert van den Hoecke (30 November 1622 in Antwerp – 1668 in Bergues-Saint-Winoc) was a Flemish painter, engraver and architect. He is principally known for his panoramic battle scenes as well as his landscape paintings. A single still life by his hand is known.

After training and starting his career in Antwerp, the artist moved to Brussels where he entered into the service of Archduke Leopold Wilhelm of Austria, the governor of the Habsburg Netherlands. Following his appointment by the Archduke to the position of Côntroleur des fortifications pour le service de sa Maj. en Flandre (Controller of fortifications in the service of his Majesty in Flanders) he lived from 1661 until his death in 1668 in Bergues-Saint-Winoc.

== Life ==
Skating on the moat in Brussels with Archduke Leopold Wilhelm watching

Robert van den Hoecke was born in Antwerp as the son of the painter Gaspar van den Hoecke and Margaretha Misson (also known as Margriet Musson). He was the half-brother of Jan van den Hoecke who became a prominent painter with an international career. Robert was likely a pupil of his father. He was admitted as a master in the Antwerp Guild of St. Luke in 1644–45 in his capacity as a son of a master. On 23 February 1647 van den Hoecke married Isabella Rosiers.

By 1649 van den Hoecke had left Antwerp for Brussels where he became a court painter of Archduke Leopold Wilhelm of Austria, the governor of the Habsburg Netherlands. Here he joined up with his half-brother Jan, court painter of the Archduke since 1644 when the Archduke was still residing in Austria. From 1661 until his death in 1668 Robert van den Hoecke resided in Bergues-Saint-Winoc as the Côntroleur des fortifications pour le service de sa Maj. en Flandre (Controller of fortifications in the service of his Majesty in Flanders). In this position he was responsible for all defence works in Flanders.

His fellow Antwerp painter Gonzales Coques painted van den Hoecke's portrait in the form of an allegory of sight, one work in a series on the five senses. The portrait shows van den Hoecke in his official capacity as "Côntroleur des fortifications" wearing a belt and a sword. The artist is holding a painter's palette in hand and in his other a just finished picture of a military camp, which corresponds to the plan of Ostend lying on the table in front of him. The choice of the painter-engraver Robert van den Hoecke as an impersonation of the sense of sight was peculiarly apt, since his delicacy of handling was particularly admired by his contemporaries.

== Work ==
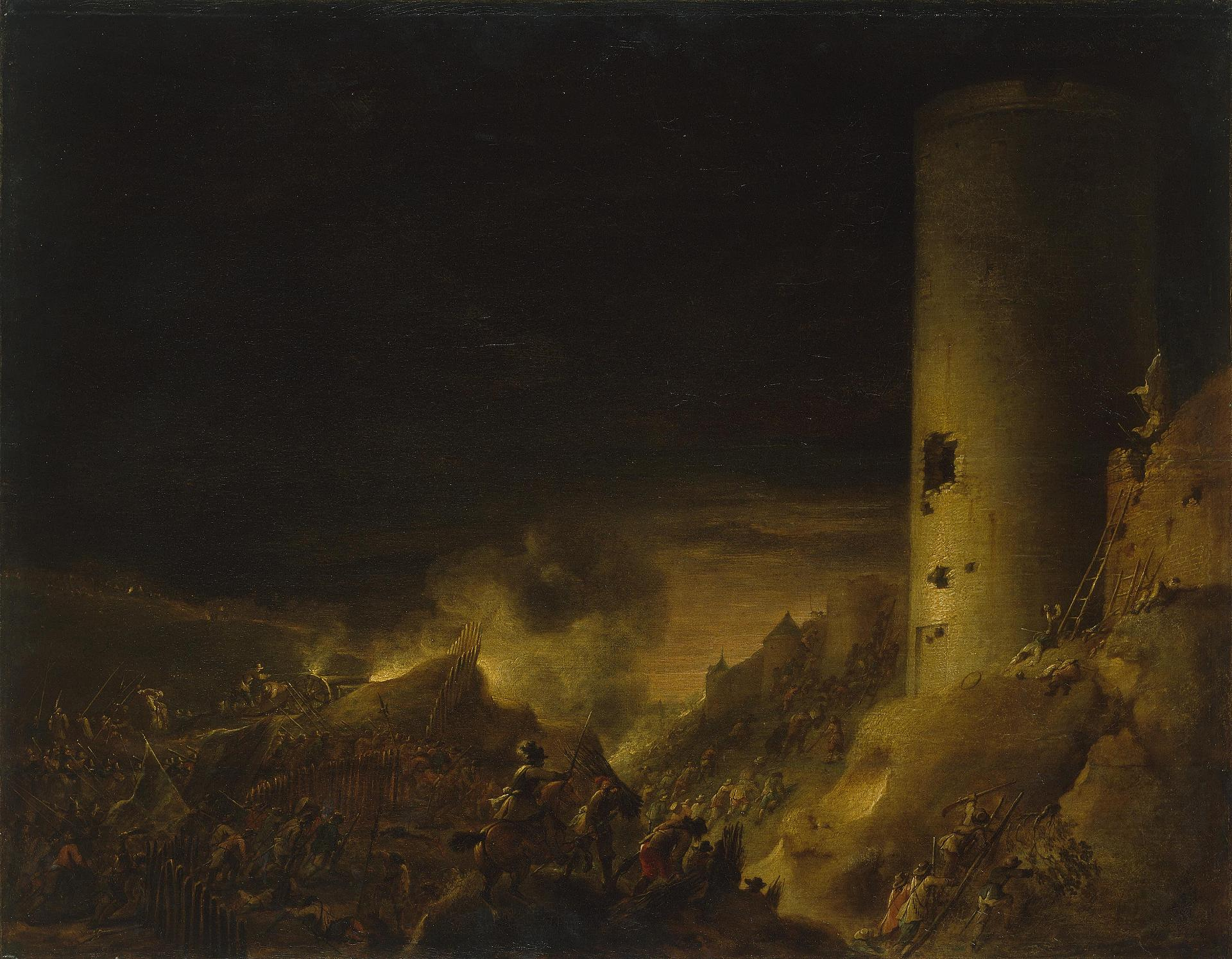
Storming of a fortress

Some thirty paintings by Robert van den Hoecke are conserved in public museums of which only two are dated – Skating on the moat in Brussels in the Kunsthistorisches Museum, Vienna (1649) and Military camp in the Musée des Beaux-Arts in Dunkerque. As controller of the fortifications of Flanders, he painted many views of camps, battles and cities. As the court painter of Archduke Leopold Wilhelm, the governor of the Southern Netherlands, Robert van den Hoecke created various compositions showing the participation of the Archduke in the daily life of the territory in his charge. These works with an obvious propagandistic intent include paintings such as the Skating on the moat in Brussels with Archduke Leopold Wilhelm watching and the Archduke Leopold Wilhelm at a nocturnal fire.

Many of his works depict battles as well as scenes from military life such as camps. These were painted on small canvases, often set at night and including a great many figures. Robert van den Hoecke was a gifted staffage and still life painter and this may be the reason why he collaborated with the court battle painter Peter Snayers on a Military scene presumably depicting the siege by Archduke Leopold Wilhelm of Armentières in 1647 (Museum of Fine Arts in Budapest). The large figures and the elaborate still life are the work of van den Hoecke, while the smaller figures in the second plane depicting the siege of the city are by the hand of Snayers.

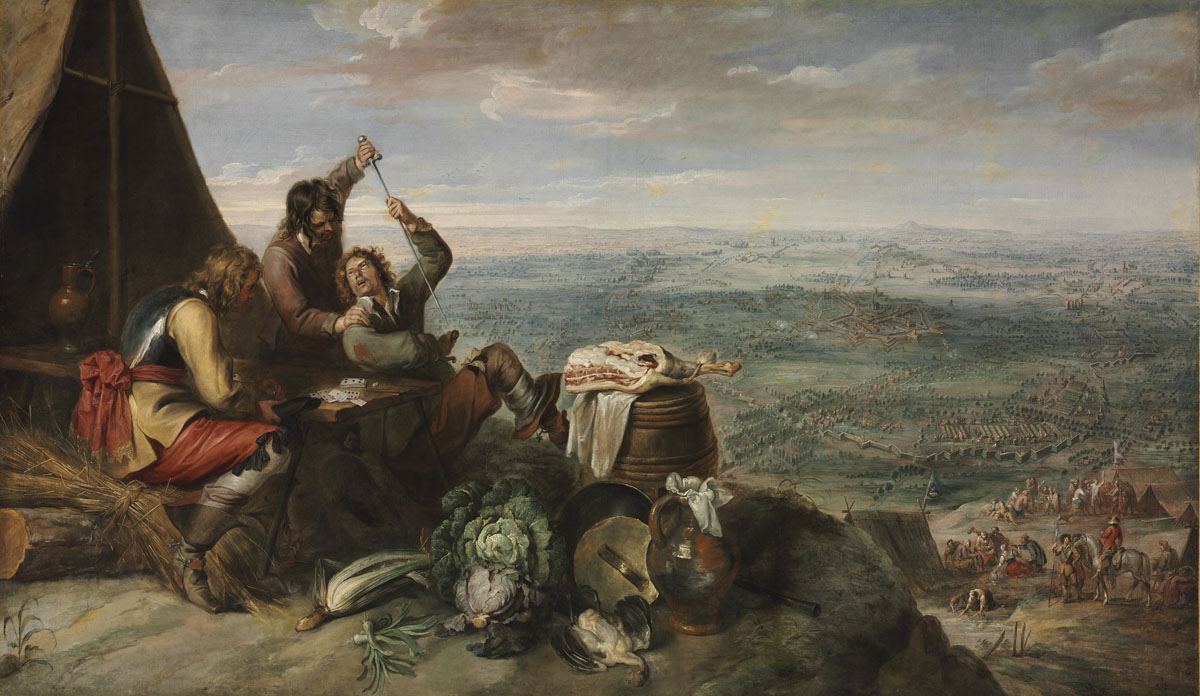
Military scene with Peter Snayers

Van den Hoecke is also known for his landscapes, many of which are winter landscapes. His small landscapes typically feature a multitude of small figures with a view of a low horizon. In these works he displayed his style which stood out through its meticulous draftsmanship, fine brushwork and bright tonalities.

Examples of the religious compositions in his oeuvre are the series of twelve paintings on copper depicting the Twelve Apostles, in the collection of the Musée du Mont-de-Piété in Bergues, which is attributed to Robert van den Hoecke. These works were formerly housed in the Saint-Victor church in Bergues. As shown in the St. Matthias from this series, the landscapes in the religious compositions and their figures are painted with the same attention to detail as in his winter landscapes.

That Robert van den Hoecke was also interested in still life painting is evidenced by a stand-alone Still life of household utensils (Kunsthistorisches Museum in Vienna). Various of his paintings also incorporate extensive still life elements as demonstrated in his contribution to the collaborative effort with Peter Snayers on the Military scene (Museum of Fine Arts in Budapest), to which he added a still life of pottery, vegetables, food and dead game.

He engraved about 21 etchings. His etchings represent mainly military subjects as well as some religious scenes. They are characterized by a great correctness, a fine touch and a quick point.

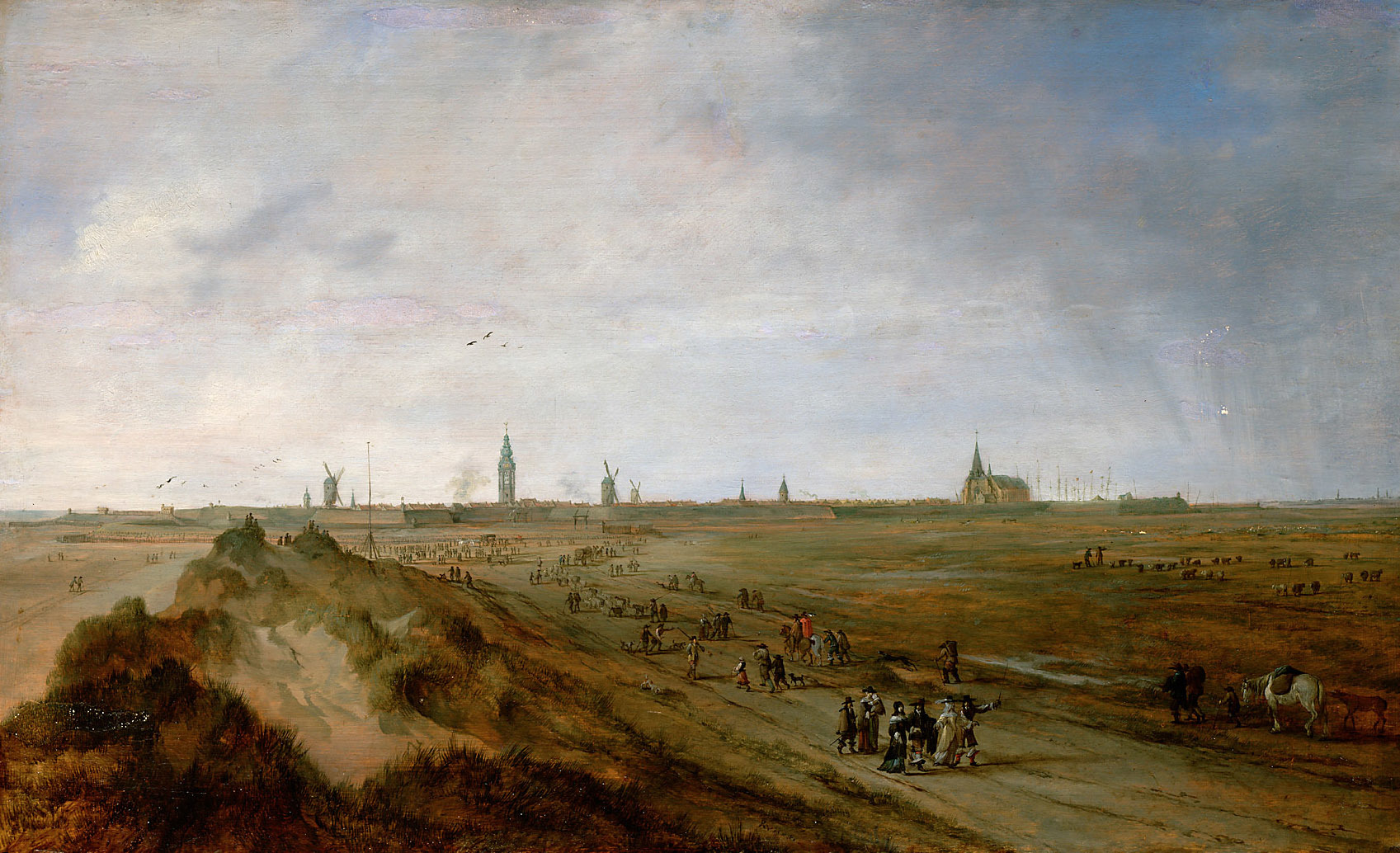
View of Ostend

A comprehensive florilegium (at Sotheby's London on 30 April 2015, lot 30), containing detailed studies of European flora such as narcissi, irises and capsicums, was attributed by a previous owner to Robert van den Hoecke. The spine label of the book is contemporary with the work and indicates the artist as "van den Hoecke". It is therefore possible that the artist responsible for the work was not Robert but his father Gaspar or his brother Jan.

The largest collection of his paintings is located in the Kunsthistorisches Museum in Vienna.
