= Jan van den Hoecke =

Flemish painter, draughtsman and designer (c. 1611–1651)

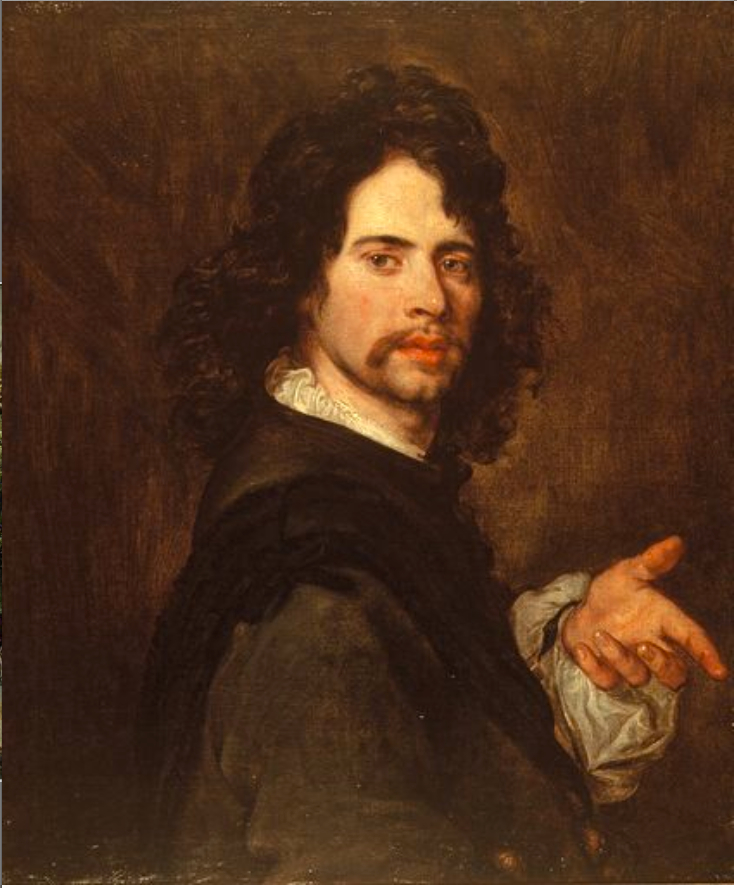
Self-portrait

Jan van den Hoecke (baptised on 4 August 1611 – 1651) was a Flemish painter, draughtsman and designer of wall tapestries. He was one of the principal assistants in Rubens' studio in the 1630s. He later traveled to Italy where he resided for a decade in Rome. He subsequently worked as a court painter in Vienna and Brussels. Jan van den Hoecke was a versatile artist who created portraits as well as history and allegorical paintings.

== Life ==
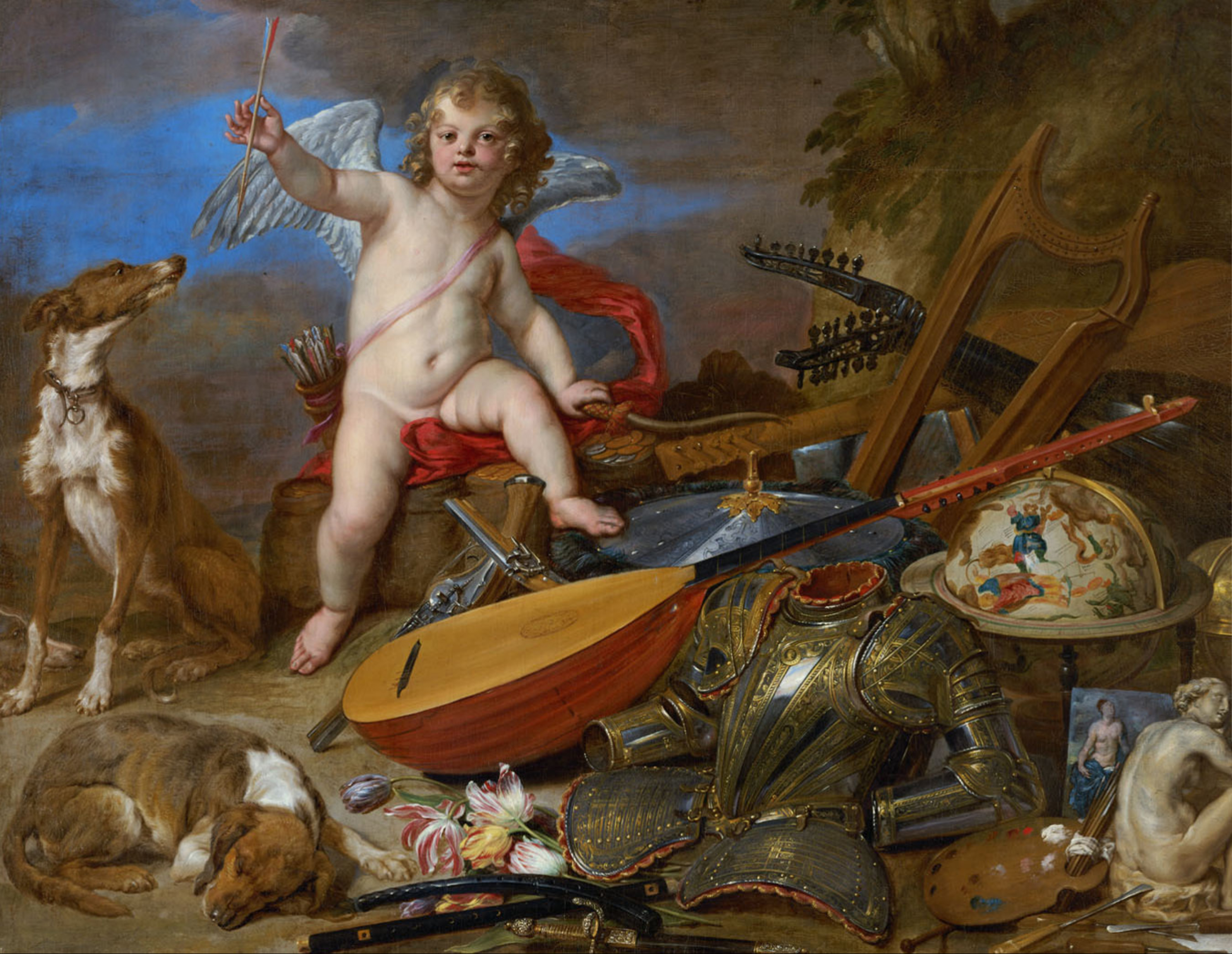
Amor vincit omnia, a collaboration with Paul de Vos

Jan van den Hoecke was born in Antwerp in July or August 1611 and was baptized on 4 August 1611. He was the son of the painter Gaspar van den Hoecke (1595–1648) and Margaretha van Leemput. It is believed that, like his half-brother Robert van den Hoecke, he first apprenticed with his father. He then worked in the studio of Peter Paul Rubens in the 1630s.

While he was at Rubens' studio he was a frequent collaborator on various major projects of Rubens. He is believed to have collaborated with Rubens on the ceiling decorations for the Banqueting Hall. Together with his father, Jan contributed to the decorations for the Joyous Entry of Cardinal-infant Ferdinand in Antwerp on 17 April 1635, the overall artistic design of which was under the direction of Rubens. Jan painted monumental representations for this occasion after designs by Rubens. Of these large-scale works some have been preserved such as the Triumphal Entrance of Cardinal Prince Ferdinand of Spain (Uffizi Gallery) and The Battle of Nördlingen, 1634 (Royal Collection). It is known that the latter work, which celebrates the Cardinal-Infant's victory over a Swedish army at the Battle of Nördlingen of 1634 was painted by van den Hoecke after an oil sketch by Rubens. It was placed at a central position in the centre of the front of the Arch of Ferdinand during the Joyous Entry. It remained outside for a few months after the event during which it was exposed to the natural elements. As van der Hoecke was in Italy by this time, Jacob Jordaens carried out some re-touching of the canvas in 1636 before it was offered to Cardinal-Infant Ferdinand in 1637.

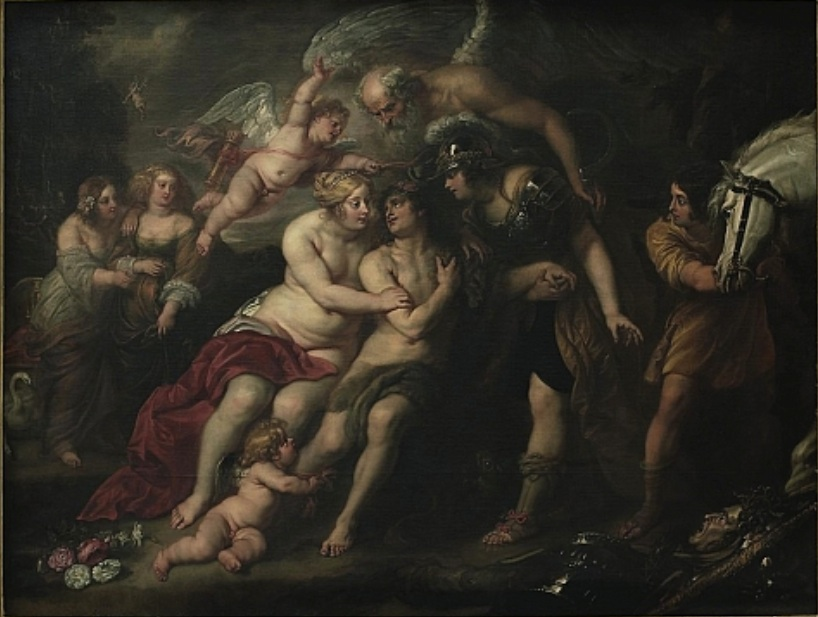
Hercules between Vice and Virtue, Uffizi

Jan van den Hoecke travelled to Italy where he resided likely from 1635 to 1644 although some extend the period of his stay to 1646. In Italy he seems to have become familiar with the paintings of Guido Reni and studied the antique. These influences explain the classicizing trends in his later work. In 1644, the artist was accepted in Rome as a member of a select club, the Virtuosi al Pantheon.

Van den Hoecke moved to Austria and entered the service of Emperor Ferdinand III in 1644. He also painted for Ferdinand's brother, Archduke Leopold Wilhelm of Austria (1614–1662), including a Madonna and Child and a number of allegorical pieces. Van den Hoecke returned to his home country with Archduke Leopold Wilhelm when the latter became the governor of the Southern Netherlands in 1647. He was at the same time a court painter and the conservator of the art collection of the Archduke, which was reported to be one of the largest in Northern Europe and comprised about 1,400 paintings and other artworks.

He died in Antwerp or Brussels.

== Work ==
=== General ===
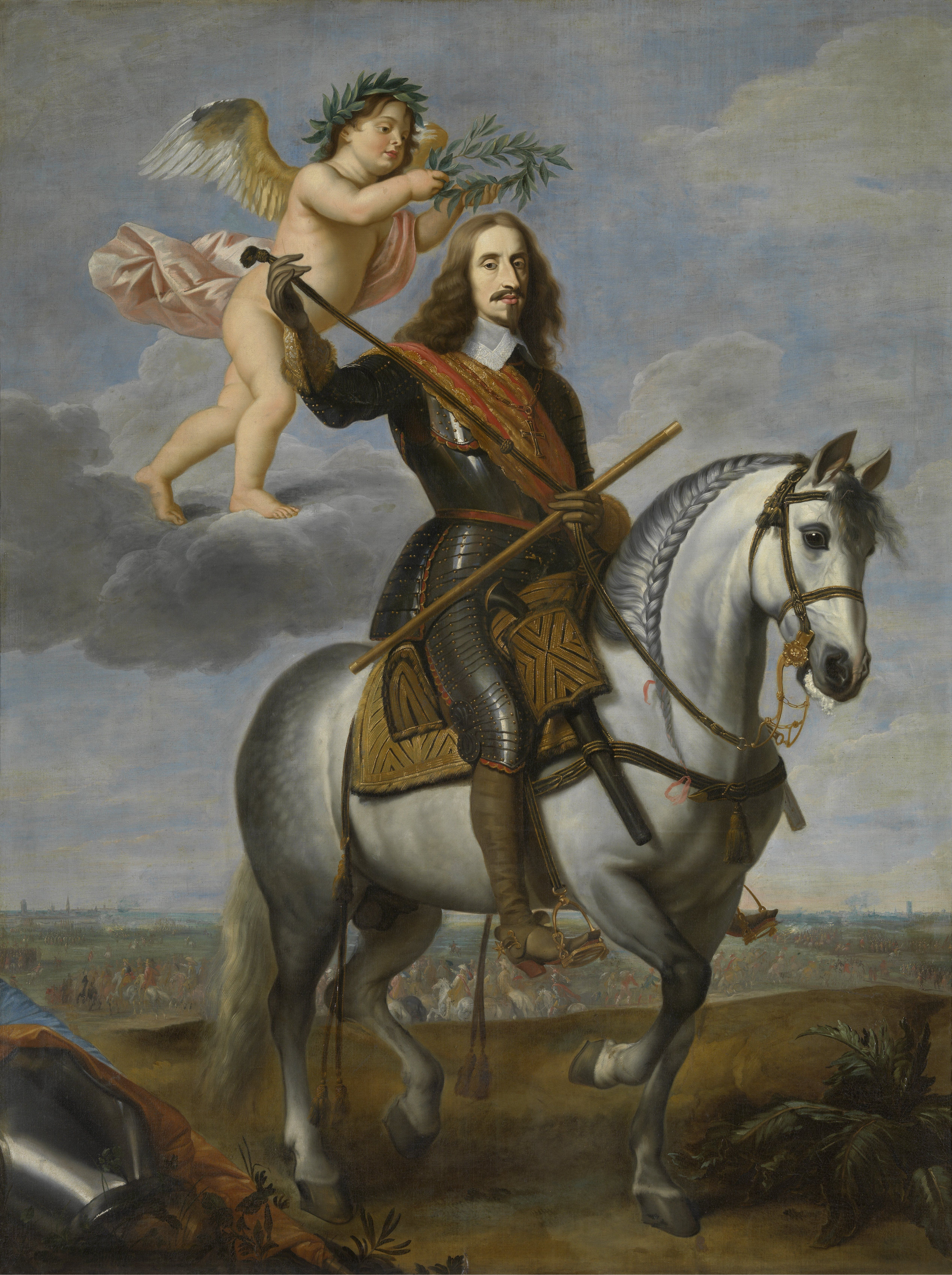
Equestrian portrait of Archduke Leopold Wilhelm

Van den Hoecke was a versatile artist producing historical paintings as well as portraits and designs for tapestries. His work combined the achievements of the art of Rubens with 17th-century Italian Classicism. The artist and his work have only started to attract renewed attention from art historians since the 1970s. A better understanding of the characteristics of his style have led to the re-attribution to van den Hoecke of works earlier given to other collaborators of Rubens such as Erasmus Quellinus II and Jan Boeckhorst and tentative attributions of work earlier given to Theodoor van Thulden. Conversely, the increased knowledge of his unique style has also led to the attribution to other painters of works earlier given to van den Hoecke.

There were 45 paintings of van den Hoecke in the Archduke's collection. This was the largest number of paintings of a Flemish artist in the collection. About half of these works found their way to the Kunsthistorisches Museum, Vienna as the collection was moved to Vienna when the Archduke returned to his home country. The large number of van den Hoecke paintings in the collection is probably due to the Archduke's preference for the more classicistic style of van den Hoecke. The Archduke also commissioned van den Hoecke to paint copies of Italian artists such as Titian and Veronese probably in order to complete the Archduke's collection of Venetian artists.

=== Style ===
His early style with its precise draughtsmanship and closeness to Rubens can be found in his oil sketch of The Triumph of David (Kimbell Art Museum) (1635) that was for a long time regarded as a work by Rubens. His Hercules between Vice and Virtue (Uffizi Gallery) shows the influence from both Rubens (particularly Rubens' style between 1610 and 1620) and Anthony van Dyck. The closeness of his style to that of Rubens may have led to the attribution in 1780 to van den Hoecke of the Massacre of the Innocents (now attributed to Rubens) when it was in the Liechtenstein Collection. Van den Hoecke painted a series of Sibyls which have been attributed to his earlier period from 1630 to 1637.

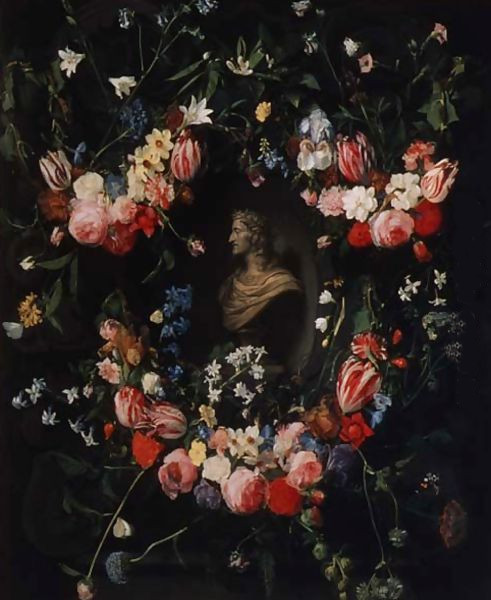
Flower garland surrounding a portrait of Archduke Leopold Wilhelm

The influence of Reni's idealized figure types as well as of Domenichino and Poussin (see the Virtue Overcoming Avarice of 1637) are visible in the allegorical paintings he produced in Vienna. An example is the Virtue Overcoming Avarice in the Kunsthistorisches Museum. His familiarity with the work of Andrea Sacchi is reflected in his portraits of Emperor Ferdinand III and Archduke Leopold William. His style retained a certain reticence and a stiffness of composition as reflected in his Equestrian portrait of Archduke Leopold Wilhelm the static composition of which is clearly different from the lively equestrian portraits by Rubens and Anthony van Dyck. A portrait of Ferdinand III (Kunsthistorisches Museum) painted at around 1643 shows the same unadorned and austere appearance and contrasts sharply with the glorious and militant portraits of the Flemish Baroque of the 1630s.

=== Collaborations ===
As was common in the Flemish art scene at the time, van den Hoecke collaborated with other painters who were specialised in a particular genre. An example is the Amor vincit omnia (Kunsthistorisches Museum), in which the figure of Cupid was painted by van den Hoecke and the still life elements by Paul de Vos. It is not clear whether the composition is an allegory of peace, as suggested by the figure of Cupid and the traditional title, or rather an allegory of transience (vanities), as indicated by the motifs of the money bag, the armour and the musical instruments.

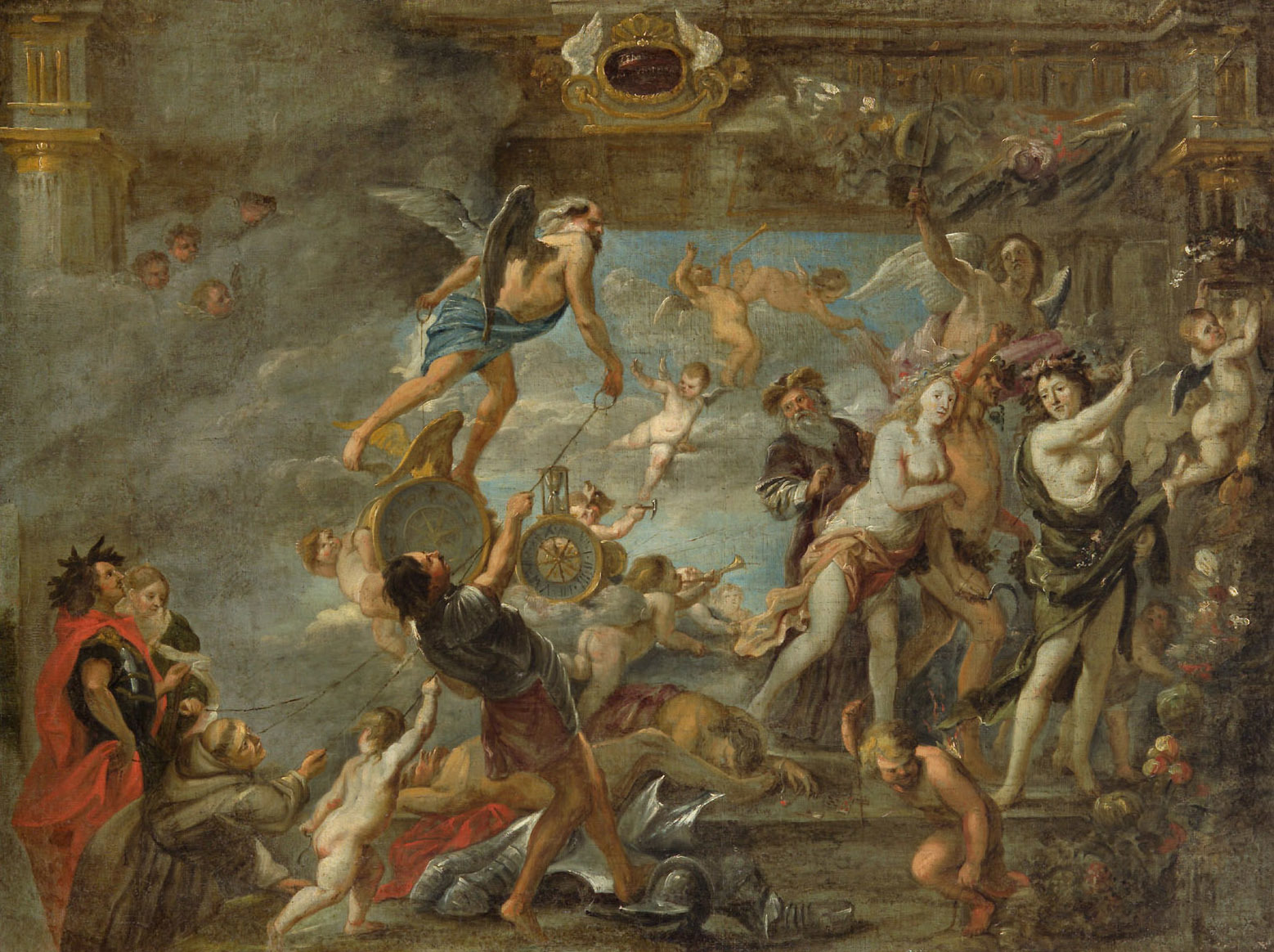
The triumph of time

Some of these collaborations involved the creation of so-called 'garland paintings'. Garland paintings are a type of still life invented in early 17th century Antwerp by Jan Brueghel the Elder and later developed further by Flemish still life painters such as Daniel Seghers. This style of painting typically shows a flower or a fruit garland around a devotional image or portrait. In the later development of the genre, the devotional image was replaced by other subjects such as portraits, mythological figures and allegorical scenes. An example of a collaboration by van den Hoecke on a garland painting is the Flower garland surrounding a portrait of Archduke Leopold Wilhelm (Uffizi Gallery). In this work Daniel Seghers painted the flowers and van den Hoecke the illusionistic bust of the Archduke.

=== Tapestry designs ===
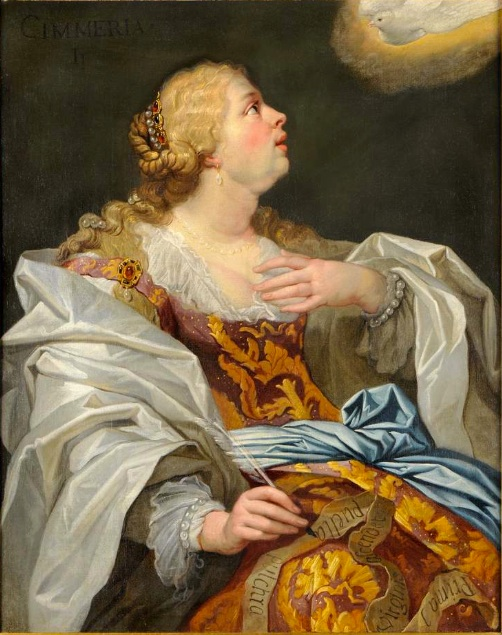
Sibylla Cimmeria

For Archduke Leopold Wilhelm, van den Hoecke further designed the pattern boards for a series of 12 wall tapestries on the motif of vanitas and a series of ten tapestries under the title 'Allegory of Time' (c. 1650): Day and Night, six pictures of The Months, the Four Seasons, the Four Elements and the Triumph of Time. The series of the Allegory of Time was woven between 1647 and 1650 in the Brussels tapestry workshop of Everaert Leyniers III. Several other artists such as Pieter Thijs and Adriaen van Utrecht also worked on the series. Ten preparatory oil sketches ("modelli") that van den Hoecke made for the series have survived (four in the Kunsthistorisches Museum, Vienna), as have eight tapestries based on the designs for Day and Night and The Months. Four of the modelli for The Months are now in the Miramare Castle in Trieste.

The cartoons of van Hoecke for the Allegory of Time series were innovative in that they dispensed with the traditional borders of the tapestries, which he replaced by elements of the picture such as piers, entablature and foreground step of the architecture as well as with sumptuous festoons of game, fowl, fish, flowers and fruit. He was also able to create an illusion of three-dimensional space by extending the architectural elements behind and around the figures. The muted palette of the modelli shows that van den Hoecke was more interested in line and composition than in colour.
