= Pieter van Lisebetten =

Peter van Liesebetten
- Born: 30 September 1630; Antwerp
- Died: 10 November 1678 (aged 48); Antwerp

Peter van Liesebetten or Pieter van Lisebetten (1630 – 1678) was an engraver from the Spanish Netherlands.

Liesebetten was born in Antwerp and is known for engravings after old master paintings, most notably a selection of paintings for David Teniers the Younger for his Theatrum Pictorium.

Liesebetten died in Antwerp.

== Gallery ==
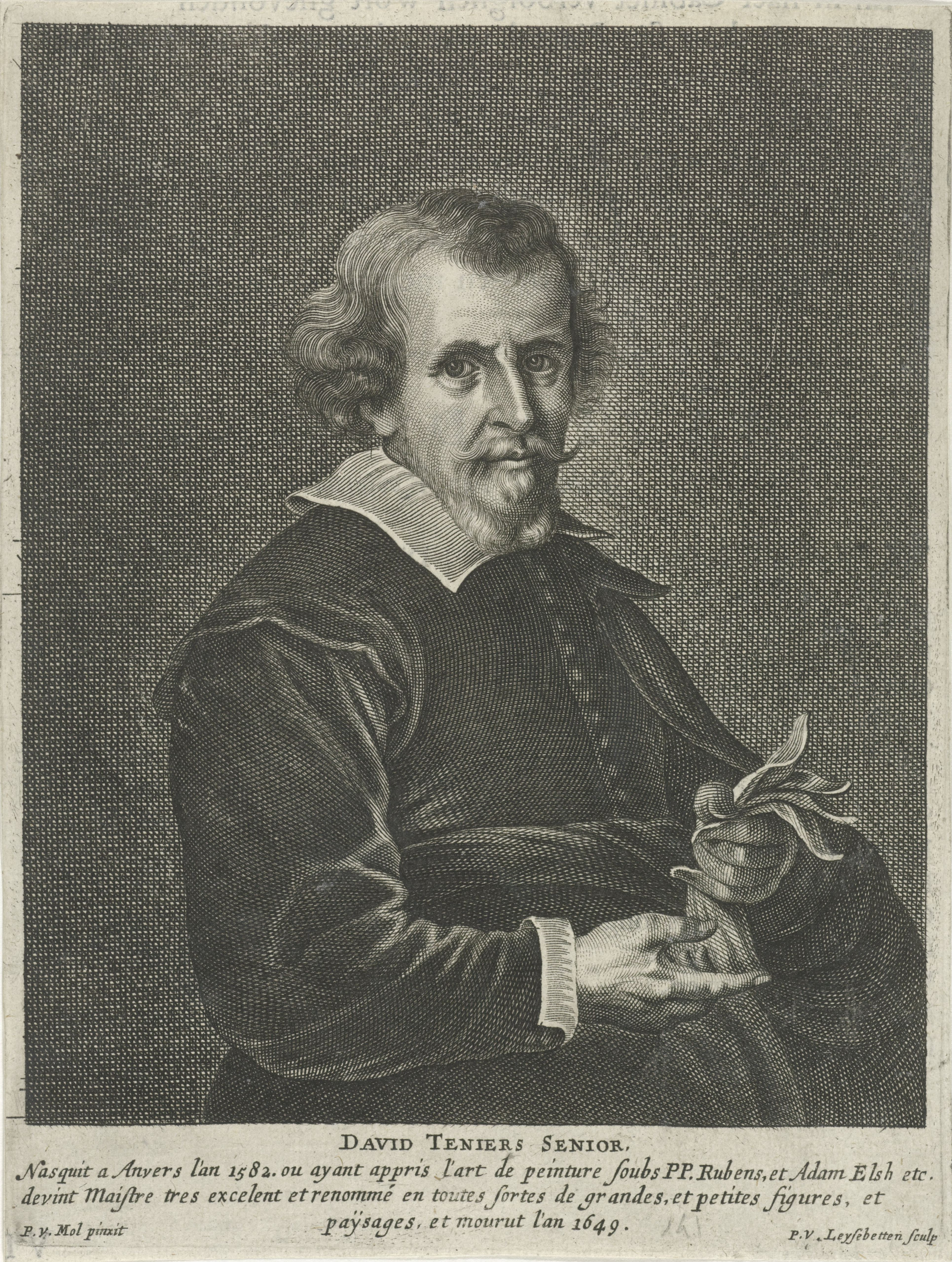
Portrait of David Teniers the Elder after a painting by Pieter van Mol, used as an illustration for Cornelis de Bie's Het Gulden Cabinet

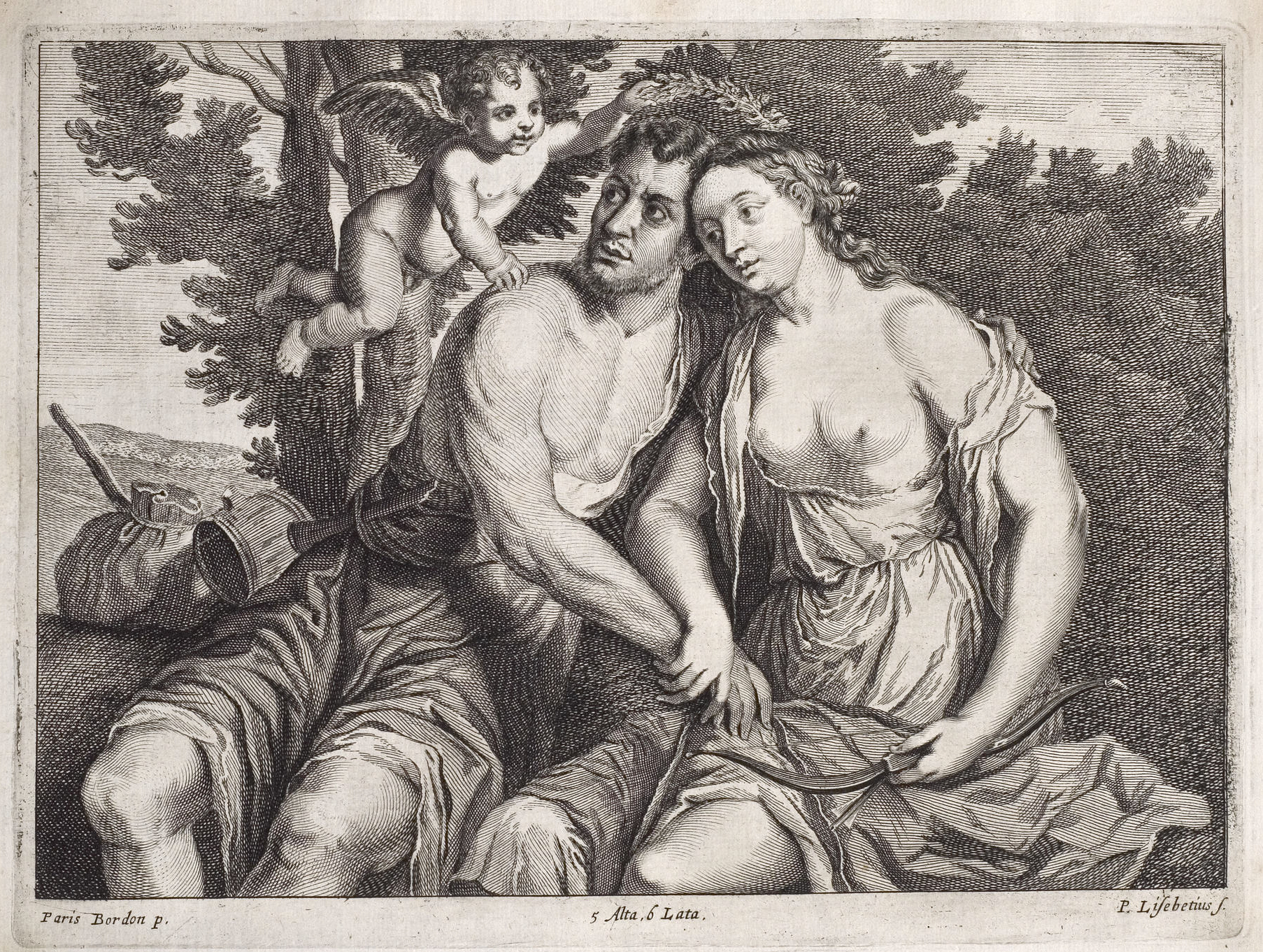
Lovers, after a painting by Paris Bordone

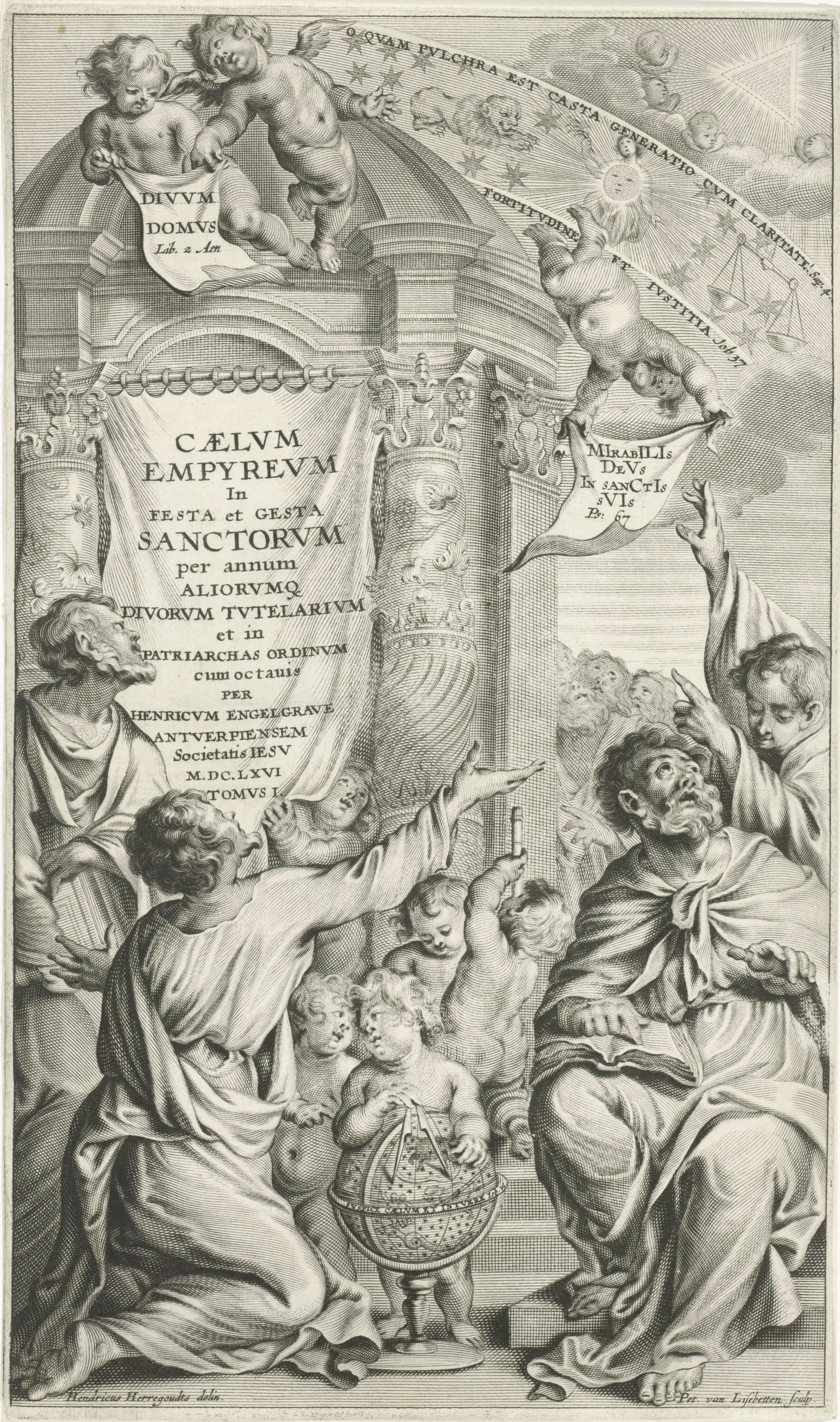
Scholars discover the tetragram
