= Juliaen Teniers the Elder =

Flemish painter

Juliaen Teniers or Juliaan Teniers (Antwerp 1572–1615) was a Flemish painter. He was a member of the extended Teniers family of painters. He was known for history, genre and flower paintings.

== Life ==
He was born in Antwerp as the eldest son of Juliaen Teniers, originally from Ath and his father's second wife Joanna van Maelbeke. His father was a successful silk merchant who owned a house on the Handschoenmarkt in Antwerp. Juliaen had one sister and four brothers of whom David Teniers the Elder became a successful painter. He was the uncle of the painters David Teniers the Younger and Abraham Teniers.

He married Suzanna Coignet, the sister of the painter Gillis II Coignet on 23 April 1595. The couple had at least three children: Jan Baptist, Melchior en Joanna.

He became a master of the Guild of St. Luke in 1595. He also joined the Gilde van de Armenbus (Guild of the Poor Box), a sort of collective insurance pool for artists in need which also played a social role. He and his wife lived in the Koningstraat until 1597, when they bought the house De Roos in the Vaartstraat. Between 1595 and 1608 he had at least eleven pupils, of whom only Gaspar van den Hoecke and his brother David the Elder still have any claim to fame. In 1610 Teniers was sued for the late delivery of commissioned paintings. In his defence he argued that he was busy making altarpieces for a church in Turnhout and for the monastery of Saint Stephen in Aalst.

Teniers died shortly before 11 March 1615.

== Work ==
He was known as a painter of history, genre and flower subjects. Together with his brother David, Juliaen painted scenes for plays performed during the Joyous Entry of the Archdukes in Antwerp. His paintings are deemed lost and are only known through inventories. These inventories make clear that he had cooperated on paintings with Joos de Momper and Claes van Cleve.

== Sources ==
- Meskens, Ad (1998). Familia Universalis: Coignet. Koninklijk Museum voor Schone Kunsten, Antwerpen.
- Rombouts, Philip Felix; van Lerius, Theodoor (1874). De liggeren en andere historische archieven der Antwerpsche Sint Lucasgilde. Baggerman.
- van den Branden, F.J. (1883). Geschiedenis der Antwerpsche Schilderschool. J.E. Buschmann.
- van den Broeck, L. (1987). Het beeld van de vorst in de Zuidelijke Nederlanden. onuitgegeven licentiaatsthesis, Katholieke Universiteit Leuven.
