= David Teniers the Elder =

Flemish painter (1582–1649)

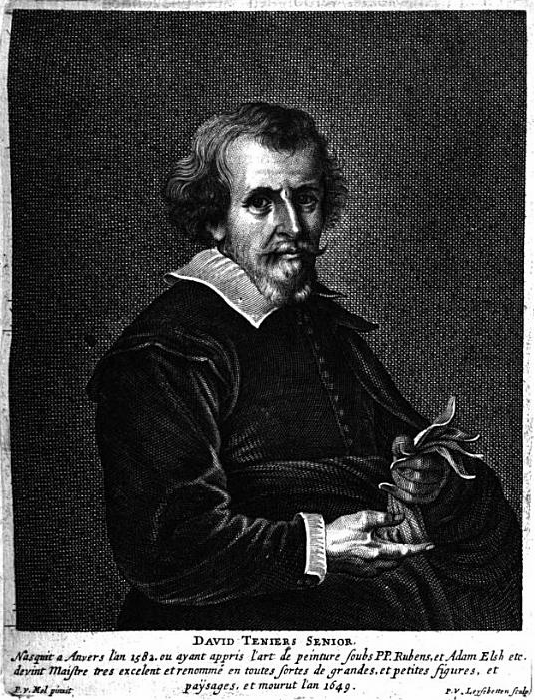
David Teniers in Het Gulden Kabinet, engraved by Peter van Liesebetten after a painting by Peter de Mol, 1661.

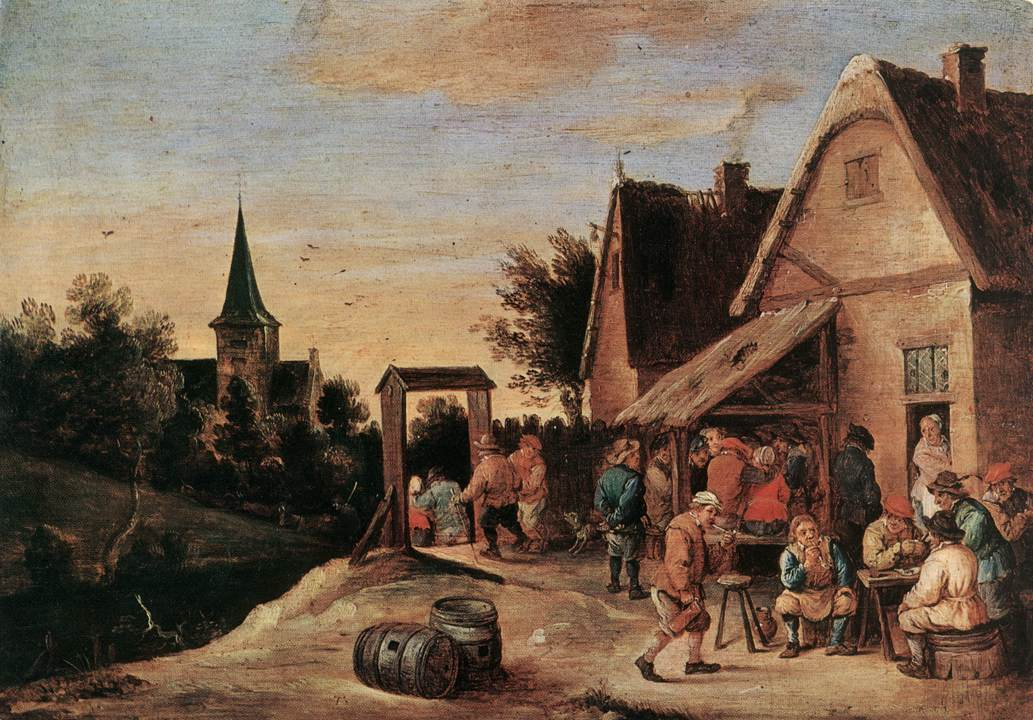
David Teniers the Elder, Village Feast, Panel Accademia Carrara, Bergamo

David Teniers the Elder (1582 – 29 July 1649), Flemish painter, was born at Antwerp of a family originally from Ath.

== Biography ==
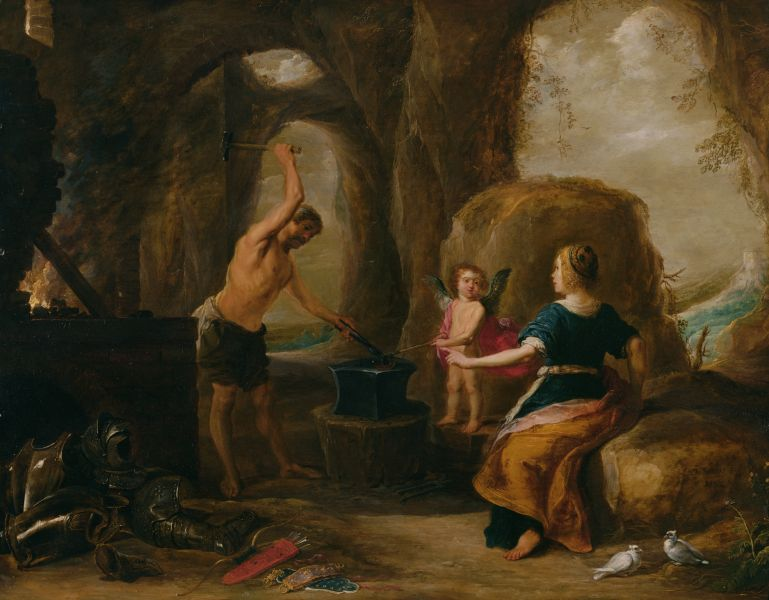
David Teniers the Elder, Venus Visiting Vulcan's Forge, The National Museum of Western Art, Tokyo

The Teniers family of painters came from Ath, a town in Hainaut.

Having received his first training in the painter's art from his brother Juliaen, he studied under Rubens in Antwerp, and subsequently under Elsheimer in Rome; he became a member of the Antwerp guild of painters in 1606.

Though his ambition led him at times to try his skill in large religious, historical and mythological compositions, his claim to fame depends chiefly on his landscapes and paintings of peasants carousing, of kermesse scenes and the like, which are marked by a healthy sense of humour, and which are not infrequently confused with the early works of his son David.

There is a large painting by the elder Teniers at St. Paul's Church, Antwerp, representing the Works of Charity. At the Kunsthistoriches Museum are four landscapes painted by Teniers under the influence of Elsheimer, and four small mythological subjects, among them Vertumnus and Pomona, and Juno, Jupiter and Io. The National Gallery has a characteristic scene of village life, Playing at Bowls, a Conversation of three men and a woman, and a large Rocky Landscape. Other examples of his work are to be found at the galleries of St Petersburg, Madrid, Brussels, Munich, Dresden and Berlin (The Temptation of St Anthony).

Teniers also achieved success as a picture dealer, and is known to have attended the fair of St Germain in Paris in 1635, with a large number of paintings by himself and by his four sons. He died at Antwerp in 1649.

== See also ==
- David Teniers the Younger
- David Teniers III
