= Gaspar van den Hoecke =

Flemish Baroque painter

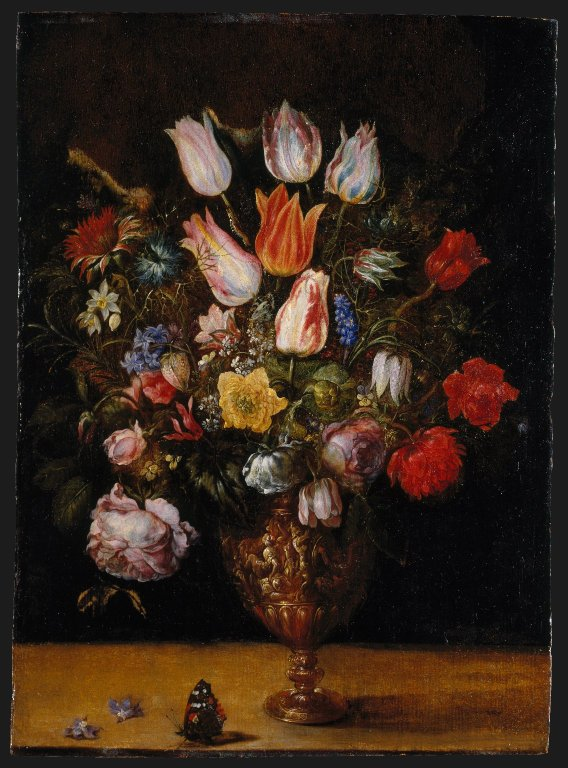
Gaspar van den Hoecke, Flowers in a Vase, Oil on panel, 49.8 x 36.2 cm, first quarter 17th century. Brooklyn Museum

Gaspar van den Hoecke (c. 1585–after 1648) was a Flemish Baroque painter of small devotional cabinet pieces in the manner of Frans Francken II. His sons Robert and Jan van den Hoecke were also painters.

Van den Hoecke, who studied under Juliaan Teniers, became a master in the Antwerp Guild of St. Luke in 1603. His early works continue Mannerist tendencies that were still popular at the beginning of the seventeenth century, but later the influences of Peter Paul Rubens and Caravaggism are noticeable in his paintings.

Recently the painting 'Kruisafname' was offered for sale via the art reseller Kunstkringloop. With an asking price of 12,000 the painting is the most expensive painting ever to be offered for sale online in the Netherlands.
