= Theodoor van Heil =

Flemish landscape painter (1635–after 1691)

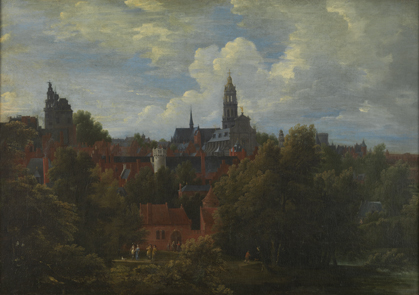
View of Brussels

Theodoor van Heil (Brussels, 1635 – after 1691), was a Flemish landscape painter known for his winter landscapes, city views and scenes of burning cities.

== Life ==
Theodoor van Heil was the son of Daniel van Heil, a landscape painter. He came from an artistic family: his grandfather Leo was a painter as were two of his uncles: Leo van Heil was an architect and painter and Jan Baptist van Heil was a portrait and history painter.

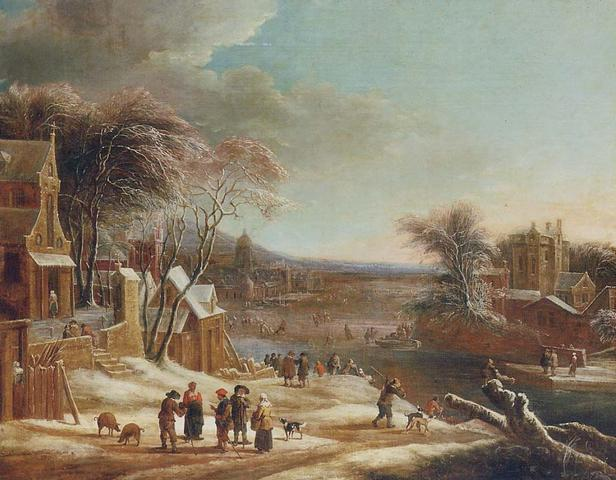
River landscape with figures

Theodoor is believed to have trained with his father. He became a master of the Brussels Guild of St. Luke in 1668.

It is known that the artist was still alive in 1691. If he was the painter of the Bombardment of Brussels in 1695 (Royal Museums of Fine Arts of Belgium) he must still have been alive in 1695.

== Work ==
Theodoor van Heil is known for landscapes in the manner of his father. This included winter landscapes and scenes of fires in cities.

Theodoor van Heil painted a number of topographic views of his home town Brussels. One View of Brussels from the castle of Koekelberg (1692, Royal Museums of Fine Arts of Belgium) shows a bird's eye view of the city seen from the north. When compared with the View of Brussels painted by the Antwerp artist Jan Baptist Bonnecroy about 30 years earlier, van Heil's view shows the city from a greater distance and from a lower viewpoint. The consequence of this is that the buildings are shown in a more compact manner. Only the large monuments are recognisable. Van Heil depicted in the foreground scenes from country life such as horse riders, cowherds, shepherds and peasants.

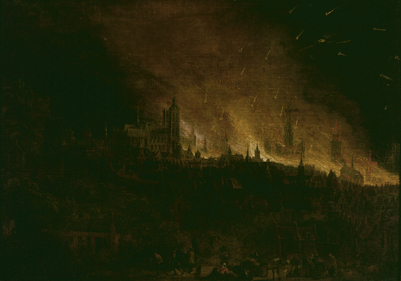
Bombardment of Brussels in 1695

Of the five other views of Brussels by Theodoor van Heil in the Royal Museums of Fine Arts of Belgium, two offer closer views of the city and three picture fires in Brussels. Particularly memorable is the Bombardment of Brussels in 1695, which shows the city in flames after the bombardment by the French troops.
