= Daniel van Heil =

Flemish Baroque landscape painter (1604–1664)

Daniel Heil
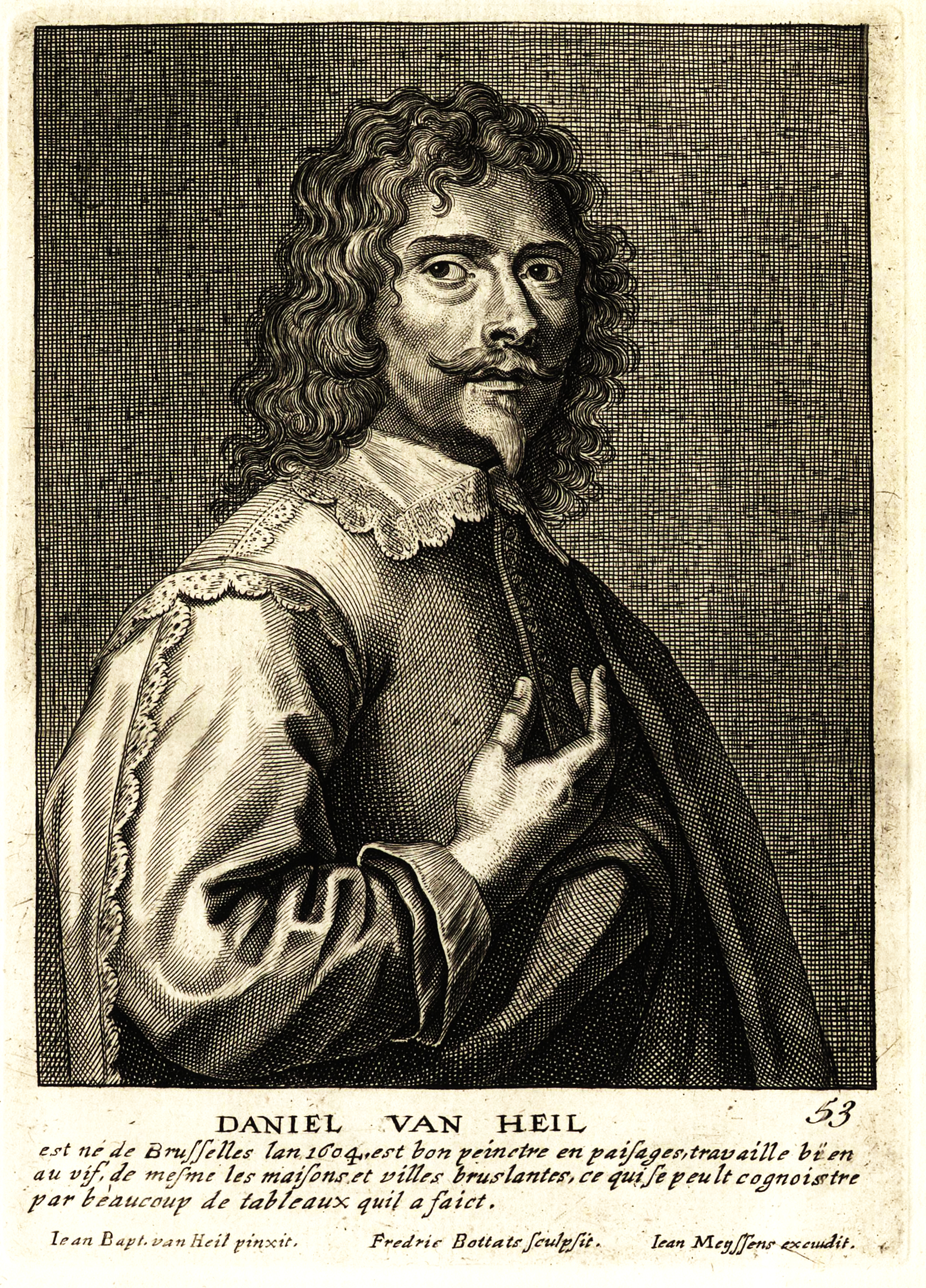
- Portrait of Daniel van Heil
- Born: 1604; Brussels, Brabant
- Died: 1664 (aged 59–60); Brussels, Brabant
- Known for: Painting
- Children: Theodoor

Daniel van Heil or Daniël van Heil (1604 – 1664) was a Flemish Baroque landscape painter. He specialised in three types of landscapes: scenes with fire, landscapes with ruins and winter landscapes.

== Life ==
Little is known about the life and training of Daniel van Heil. He was born in Brussels. His father Leo or Leon was a painter and two of his brothers were also artists: Leo was an architect and painter and Jan Baptist was a portrait painter.

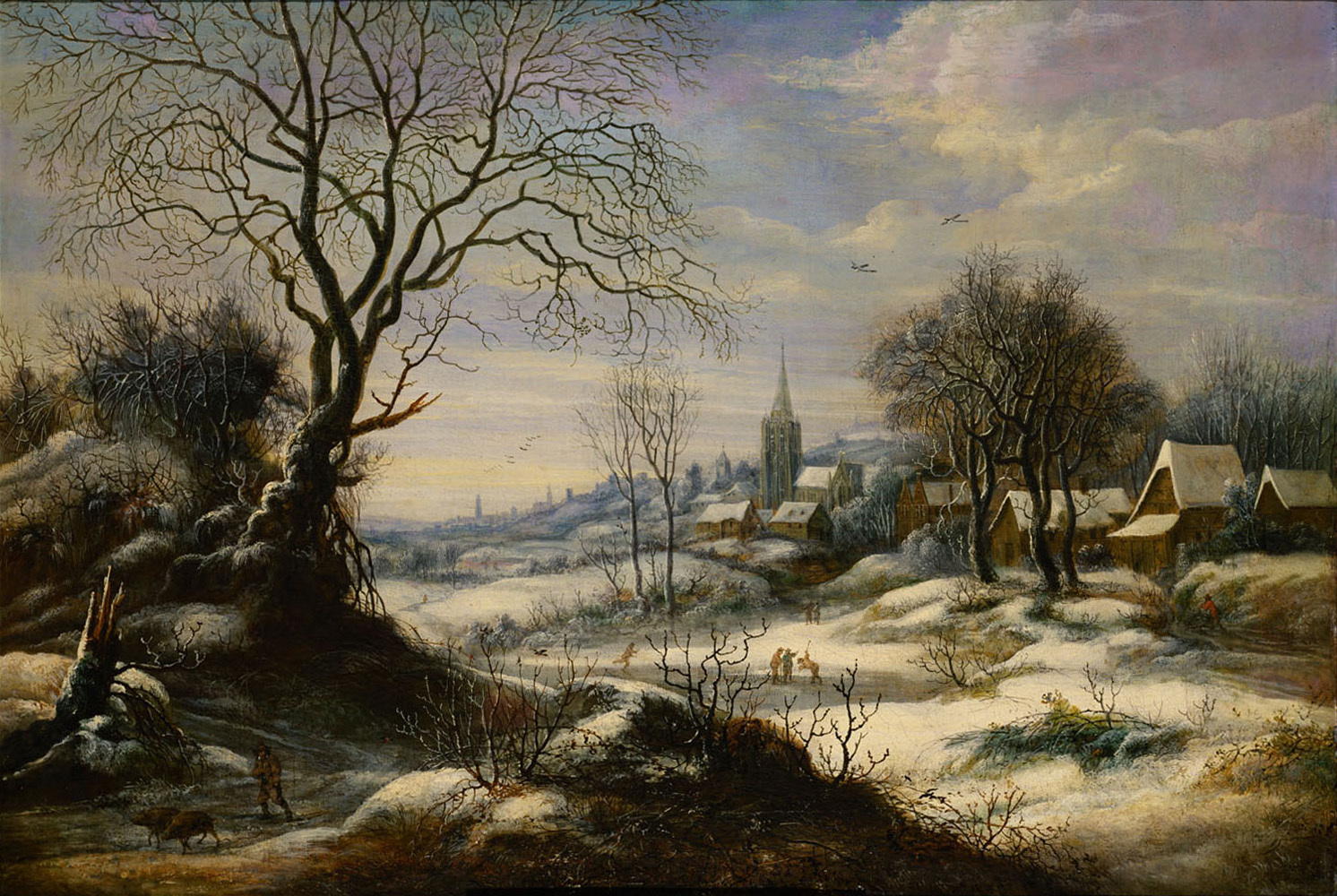
Winter landscape

It is not known with whom Daniel trained but it was likely his father. He became a master in the Brussels Guild of St. Luke in 1627.

His son Theodoor van Heil trained with his father and produced landscapes of similar subject matter executed in the same style as his father.

The artist died in Brussels in 1664.

== Work ==
Daniel van Heil was a landscape painter. His subjects were principally winter landscapes, fires in cities and landscapes with ruins.

The theme of fires in cities, which appeared in the early 17th century was not new to Flemish iconography. The subject often appeared in earlier art as a secondary theme in depictions of biblical or mythological apocalypses and destruction. These earlier works often set the subject at night in an environment sometimes populated with fantastic or demonic beings. The actual subjects of these scenes included the fall of Troy, Aeneas and Juno in the underworld and the destruction of Sodom and Gomorrah. Hieronymus Bosch was the first northern artist to paint such fire scenes and later painters in the Brueghel dynasty developed the subject matter further.

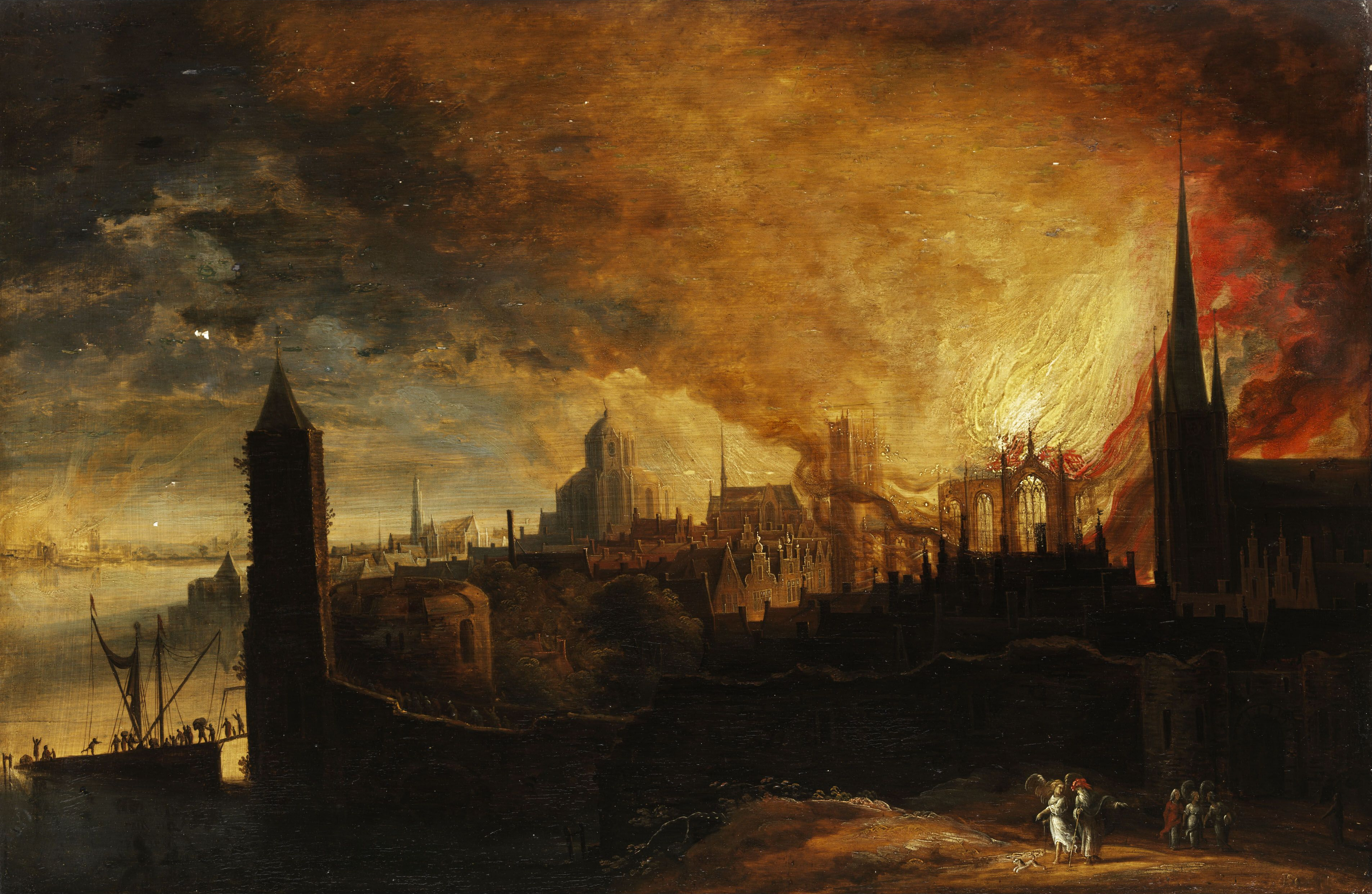
Burning city with Lot and his daughters

In the 17th century the theme of fires in cities became an independent subject matter in its own right. The subject was explored mainly for its formal aspects and pictorial possibilities: the depiction of spectacular effects of light and shadow had become a goal in itself. A simultaneous development was for the subjects of the compositions to become less clear and elements of tradition and innovation to become mixed. This is reflected in the architectural setting of the scenes, where contemporary architecture forms the background for a mythological or biblical scene. This mixing up of myth and contemporary events was possibly a result of the experiences of the artist who lived in a time when war and destruction of cities by armies was not uncommon. These works thus used the iconic examples of classical antiquity to give voice to their indignation about contemporary destructions they had witnessed.

This is illustrated by van Heil's Fire of Antwerp with the Trojan horse. This composition shows the mixing of contemporary events such as the sack of Antwerp by Spanish troops in 1576 known as the Spanish Fury, with mythological elements such as the Trojan horse. It is also not entirely clear whether the city depicted is in fact Antwerp. The church represented in the centre bears a resemblance to Antwerp Cathedral but the city architecture further includes Trajan's Column of Rome. Some of the buildings depicted may actually be buildings in Brussels. This mixing of real and fantastic elements in the work reinforces the impression that the city it represents is imaginary.

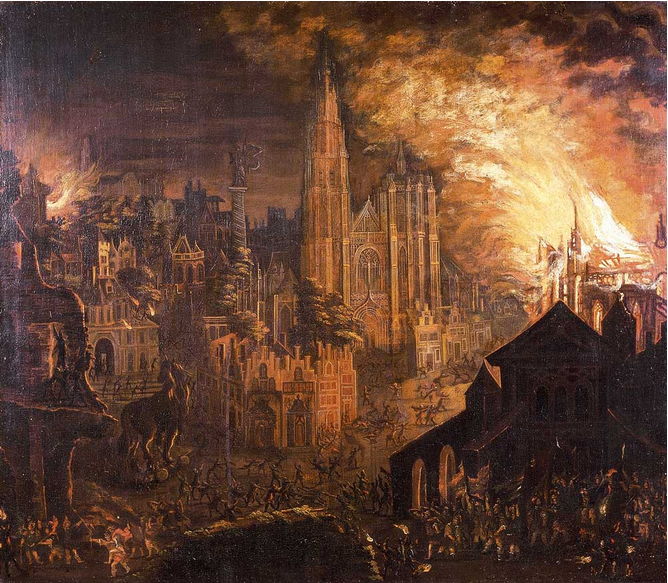
Fire of Antwerp with the Trojan horse

The theme of the fall of Troy and the flight of Aeneas with his father was a subject to which van Heil often returned. In his scenes of Troy the artist also presented an anachronistic vision of the city by combining Antique ruins with contemporary buildings. This is demonstrated in the Burning of Troy (at Christie's New York on 26 January 2005, lot 214) in which classical structures are found next to church spires and basilicas in the background and more humble typically Flemish houses in the foreground. By emphasizing the magnificence of the diverse structures van Heil linked Brussels as the residence of the Archduke and Archduchess Albert and Isabella with Troy as the court residence of King Priam. The architecture dominates the composition and the protagonists of the battle only appear as miniature figures. The intense human tragedy of the scene is expressed through the menacing sky which takes up a large portion of the canvas in vertical format which was unusual for the artist.

Daniel van Heil's winter landscapes were in the tradition of Breughel the Elder, with a tendency towards pre-Romantic Impressionism. His winter views show the influence of the Ruisdaels as well as other artists such as Kerstiaen de Keuninck, especially in his early works. From these artists he took the compositional scheme. A characteristic motif of his landscapes is the presence of naked trees lit from behind with the interlacing branches framing the scene. His landscapes with ruins were in the style of Netherlandish Italianate landscapers.

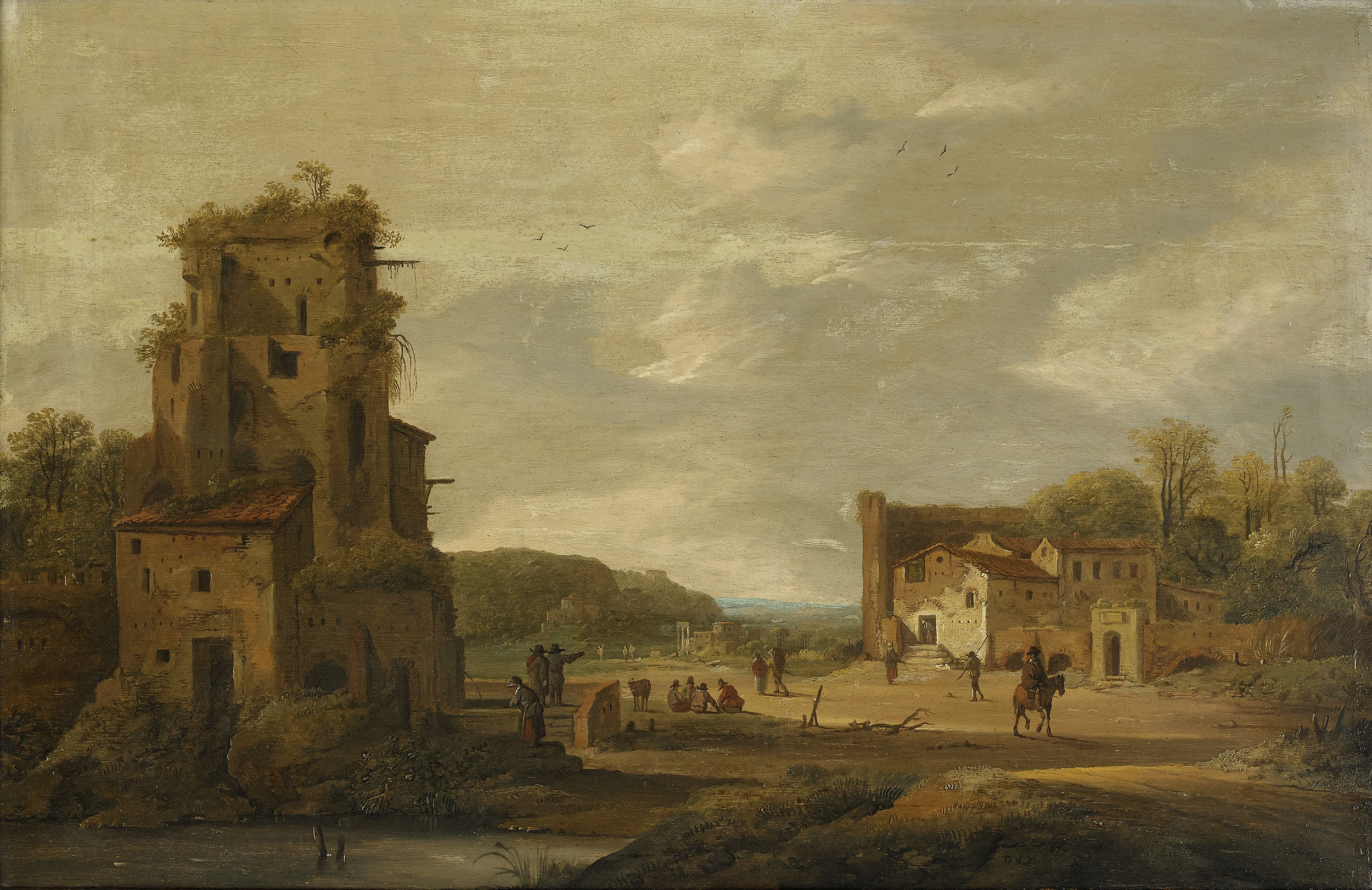
Landscape with ruins

Daniel van Heil collaborated with his brother Jan Baptist on the Infante Isabella in the gardens of the Coudenberg Palace (c. 1630, Museum of the City of Brussels). Daniel is believed to have been responsible for the landscape with the palace while his brother Jan Baptist for the staffage. The canvas shows a landscape with the palace of the governors of the Southern Netherlands near Brussels. In the foreground the Archduchess Isabella, widow of Archduke Albrecht and reigning governess, walks in the gardens of the palace in the habit of the Poor Clares, a religious order the Archduchess had joined after the death of her husband.
