= Renier Meganck =

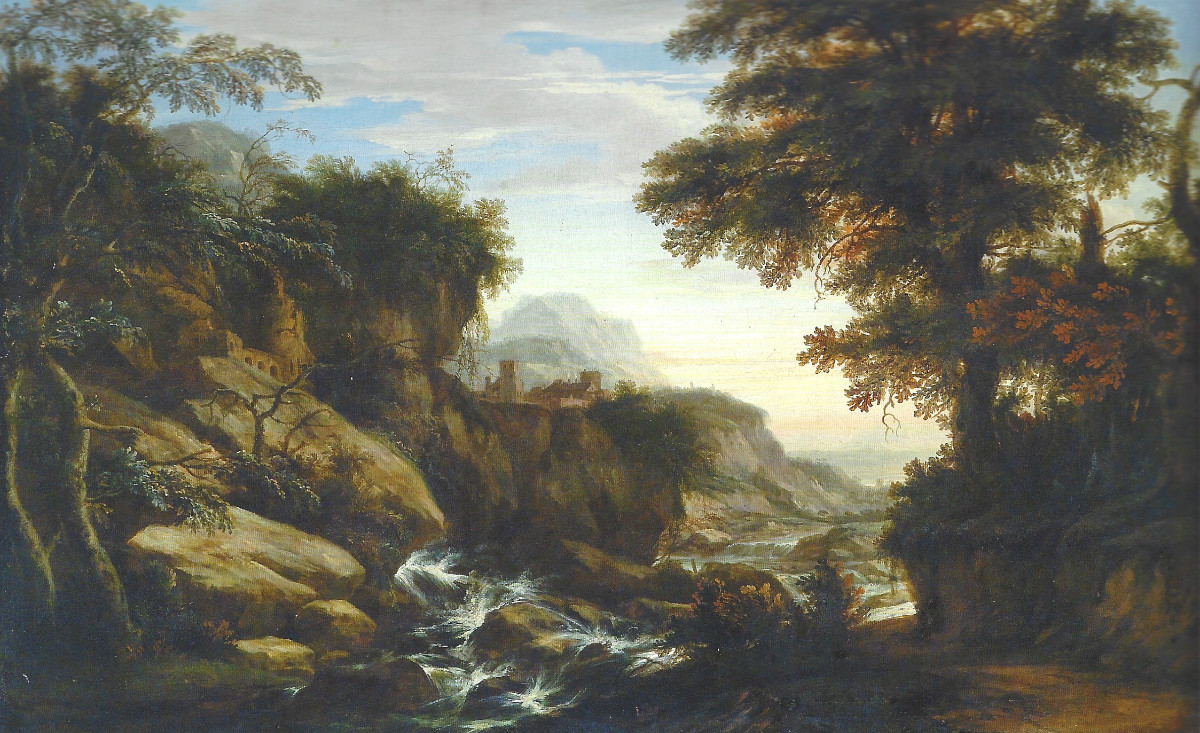
Mountainous forest landscape with a view of a castle

Renier Meganck (Brussels, baptised on 14 September 1637 – Vienna, 27 November 1690) was a Flemish painter and printmaker known for his landscapes and still lifes. After training in Brussels and working in Ghent, he worked in Central Europe and finally in Vienna where he was active as a painter to the Imperial court and an art dealer. His patrons included Karl Eusebius, Prince of Liechtenstein who was the founder of the Liechtenstein collection.

== Life ==
Meganck was born in Brussels where he was baptised in the Church of Our Lady of the Chapel on 14 September 1637. His parents were Anton (Antoni) Meganck and Magdalena van Grimberghen. In 1656 he became a pupil of Leo van Heil in Brussels. Leo van Heil was a canvas painter and miniature painter as well as an architect. After completing his studies with van Heil, Meganck was recorded from 1661 to 1669 in Ghent where he became a master of the local Painter’s Guild in 1661.

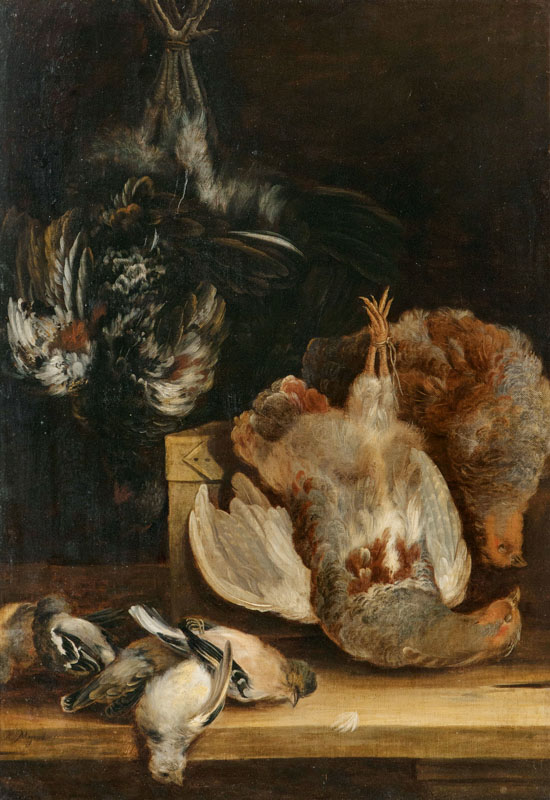
Hunting still life

He traveled to Central Europe in the second half of the 1660s and no later than 1667. It is believed that around 1668-69 he was present in Kroměříž (now in the Czech Republic) (not far from Brno) where he worked on a series of landscapes for the Archbishop's castle. He was accompanied by another painter known by his last name Kegel, who may have been and assistant or apprentice. Meganck designed and partially painted a set of lunette-shaped landscapes, which are still in situ in the castle.

Meganck is first recorded in Vienna in 1671 when he acted as a witness and sealed the last will of Franciscus van der Steen, a compatriot from Antwerp. Franciscus van der Steen was one of the many artists of the Southern Netherlands who had followed Archduke Leopold Wilhelm, the art loving governor of the Southern Netherlands, upon his return to Vienna in 1656. Franciscus van der Steen was principally active as a reproductive engraver. In Vienna Meganck likely first worked in the workshop of van der Steen. Van der Steen died in early 1672.

In Vienna Meganck enjoyed high patronage. He was appointed painter to the Imperial court ('kaiserlicher Kammermaler'). Karl Eusebius, the second Prince of Liechtenstein, became a prominent patron of Meganck. The prince is regarded as the founder of the renowned Liechtenstein collection, which forms the basis of the collection of the Liechtenstein Museum. Meganck did not only sell his own paintings to the Prince buy also acted as the Prince's agent in the purchase of works by other artists. It is known that Meganck arranged for the sale of four landscapes by the Dutch painter Hans de Jode to the Prince.

Meganck died in Vienna on 27 November 1690.

== Work ==
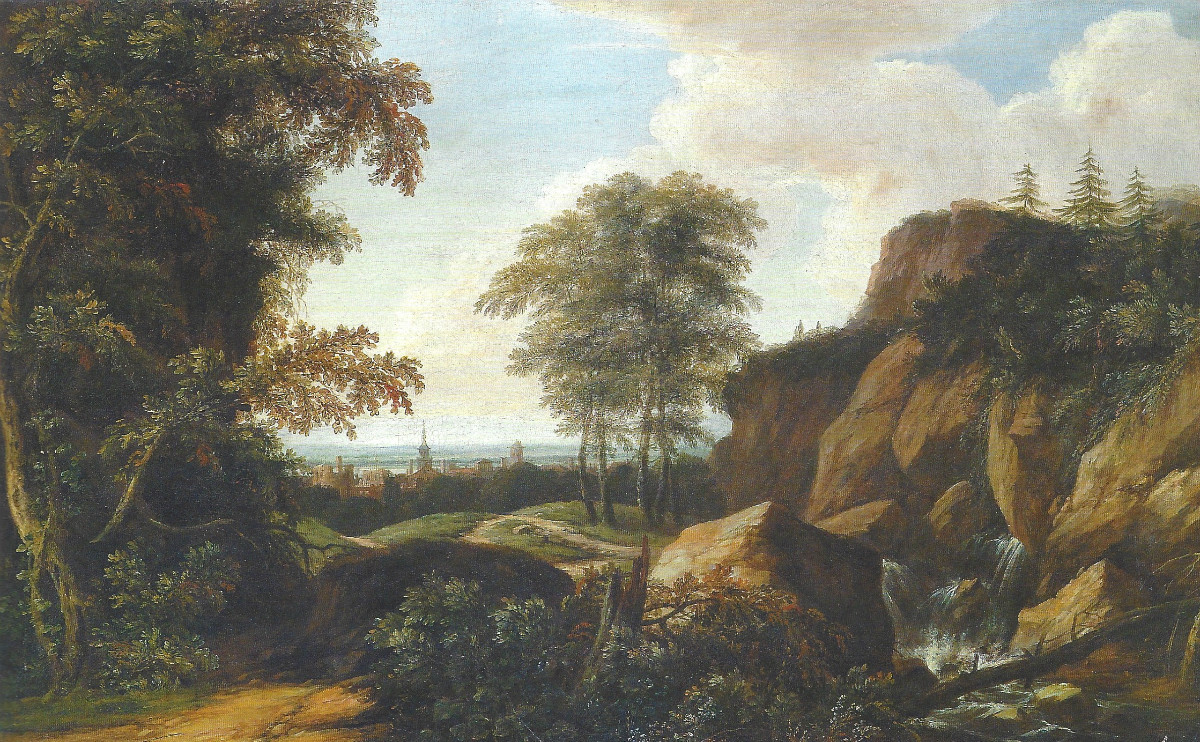
Forest landscape with a view of a town

Meganck was mainly known as a landscape painter but he also painted the occasional hunting still life and vanitas still life. He was further active as an etcher. Six engravings of mountain landscapes by him are recorded.

Meganck was held in high esteem as a landscape painter. His works show a certain similarity with the works of Hans de Jode and it is possible that the artist spent some time in Hans de Jode's workshop in Vienna.

For the Archbishop's castle in Kroměříž Meganck designed and partially painted in 1668-69 a set of 16 lunette-shaped landscapes, which are still in situ. During a restoration of the paintings undertaken in 2016–2017 it was discovered that not all of the works in the series were autograph. Likely two artists collaborated on the series leading to three distinctive quality levels. The highest quality ones were originals by Meganck, some of which he signed. The medium quality works are presumed to be a collaborative effort by Meganck and his apprentice or assistant Kegel. The lowest quality works, of which there are nine, were painted by a copyist, possibly Kegel, who varied the motifs and visual elements present in Meganck's work but without much inspiration. The high quality works by Meganck were likely made the earliest and the lowest quality ones later without his direct involvement. The autograph works of Meganck achieve a form of magical realism which was highly original for his time. This was realized through various devices such a low horizon or, sometimes, dramatic diagonal horizon and dramatic transitions between light and shadow. He sometimes placed figural motifs in his landscapes, on other occasions he just expressed the raw power of nature, with minor traces of human presence. His original landscapes achieve a harmonious whole through the mutual connection of the various elements in the composition. At present, the archiepiscopal collections in Kroměříž include 25 paintings associated with Renier Meganck, of which 24 are stored in Kroměříž and one in Olomouc.

Lunette-shaped landscapes in Kroměříž Castle

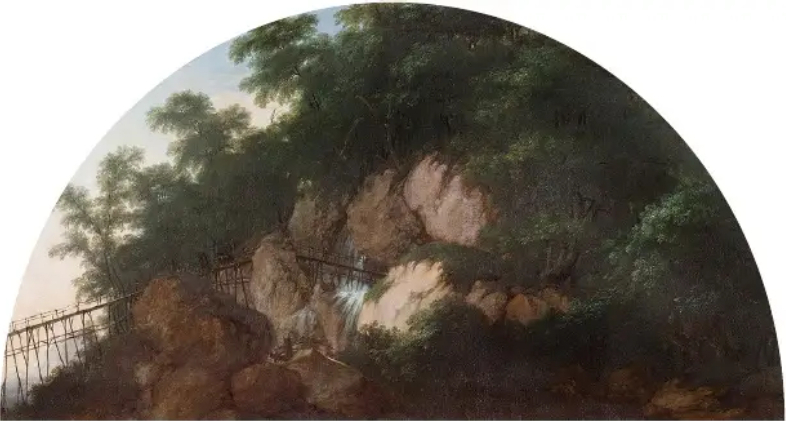

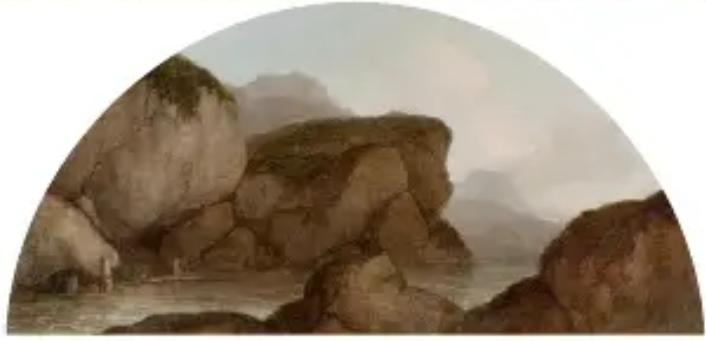

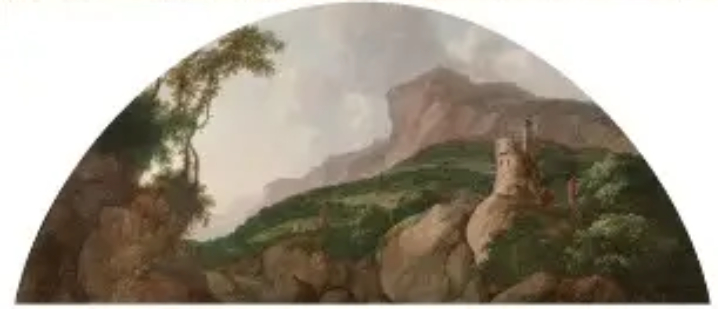

Landscapes by Meganck are part of the collections of Austrian museums, such as the Kunsthistorisches Museum in Vienna, the Liechtenstein Museum in Vienna and the Harrach Collection in Schloss Rohrau.

Only three still lifes by Meganck are known, all three signed. Two of them are still lifes with dead game and one is a vanitas still life dated to 1664.
