= Bartholomeus Appelman =

Dutch painter

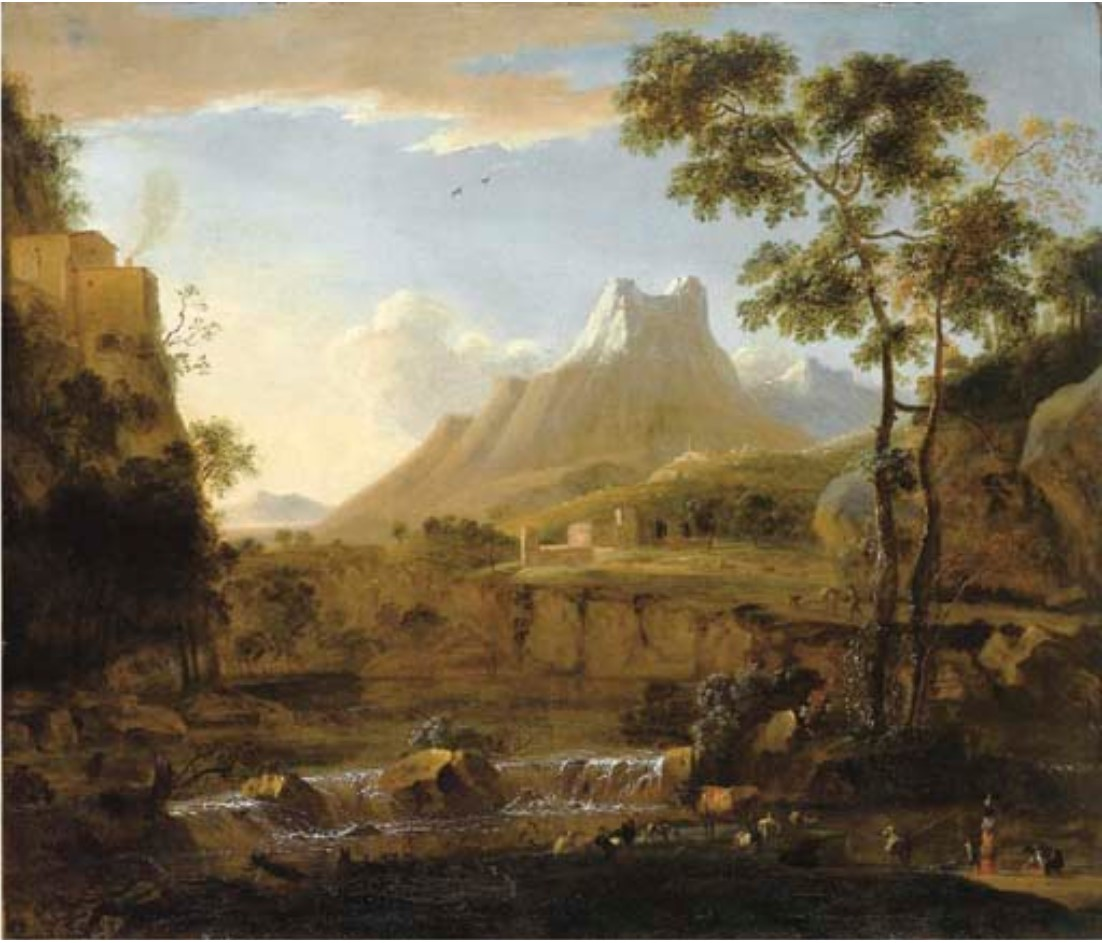
River landscape with shepherds and herdsmen and the Apuan Alps in the background

Bartholomeus Appelman, sometimes erroneously referred to as Barend Appelman, nickname Hector (1628/29 in The Hague – 1686 in The Hague) was a Dutch painter and draughtsman. After training in his native country, he travelled to Italy where he continued his studies. He is known for his Italianate landscapes.

== Life ==
Not much is known about the early life of the artist. He was born in The Hague in 1628 or 1629. It is not recorded with whom he trained. The earliest documented reference to the artist dates to 1656. On 10 July of that year the painter Petrus Vignois addressed a petition to the Hof van Holland (Court of Holland, at that time the highest judicial authority in the Dutch Republic) from the jail in The Hague where he was locked up. In his petition Vignois recounts the events that had led to his arrest. On the evening of 25 August 1647 he and his fellow painters Bartholomeus Appelman, Hans de Jode and Carel Codde were strolling through The Hague when two men started following and harassing them. Despite the painters' entreaties for them to back off, they were forced to draw their swords. In the ensuing scuffle de Jode injured one of the men so badly that he died immediately. De Jode fled The Hague the same night. The three other painters including Appelman stayed in The Hague until each of them set off on their study trip to Italy. The bailiff only started his proceedings against the foursome in 1653. Codde who was the only one who had come back to The Hague could quickly prove his innocence and was let go. The three others residing abroad were not even aware that proceedings had been commenced against them. Vignois was locked up upon his return from Italy in 1656. Appelman was then still residing in Italy.

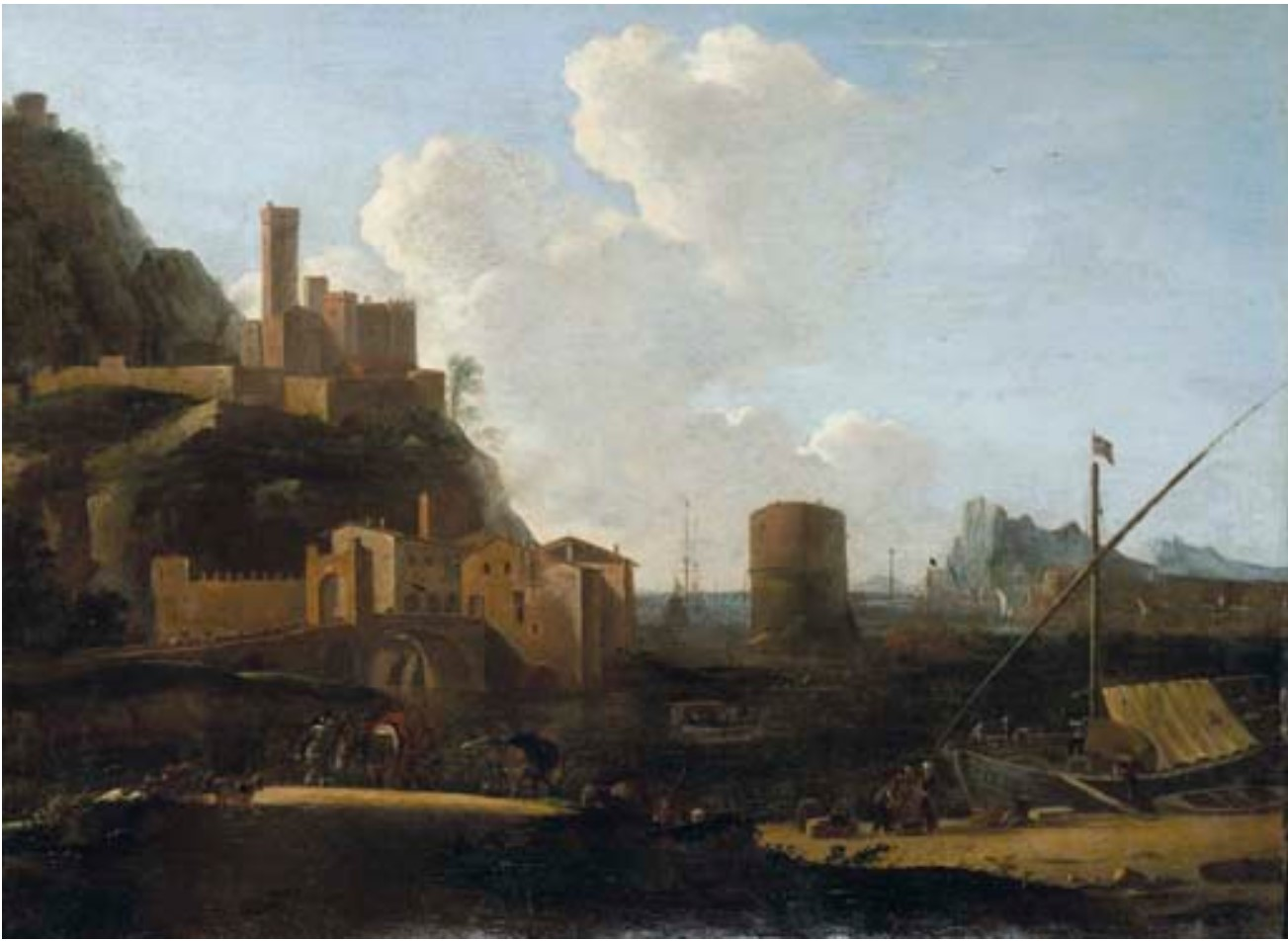
View of a Mediterranean port

He likely arrived around 1650 in Italy. In 1657 he is mentioned in Rome together with Philips le Petit and Willem Doudijns. In Rome he joined the Bentvueghels, an association of mainly Dutch and Flemish artists working in Rome. His nickname in the Bentveughels was 'Hector'. He also spent time in Tivoli where he produced a landscape drawing (Museum Boijmans van Beuningen, Rotterdam).

After his return from Italy he seems to have led a wandering existence as a mercenary. He is mentioned as a friend of the painter Jan de Baen and as somebody, who 'for weeks had the habit of putting his feet under another man's table.' In 1671 he is recorded in Amsterdam on the occasion of his renting of a room with a widow. He is further recorded in connection with a disturbance of the peace. He is mentioned in Rotterdam.

He finally moved back to The Hague in 1676, where in the same year he became a master in the local guild of Saint Luke. In 1677 and 1681 he was a dean of the guild.

He died in 1686.

== Work ==
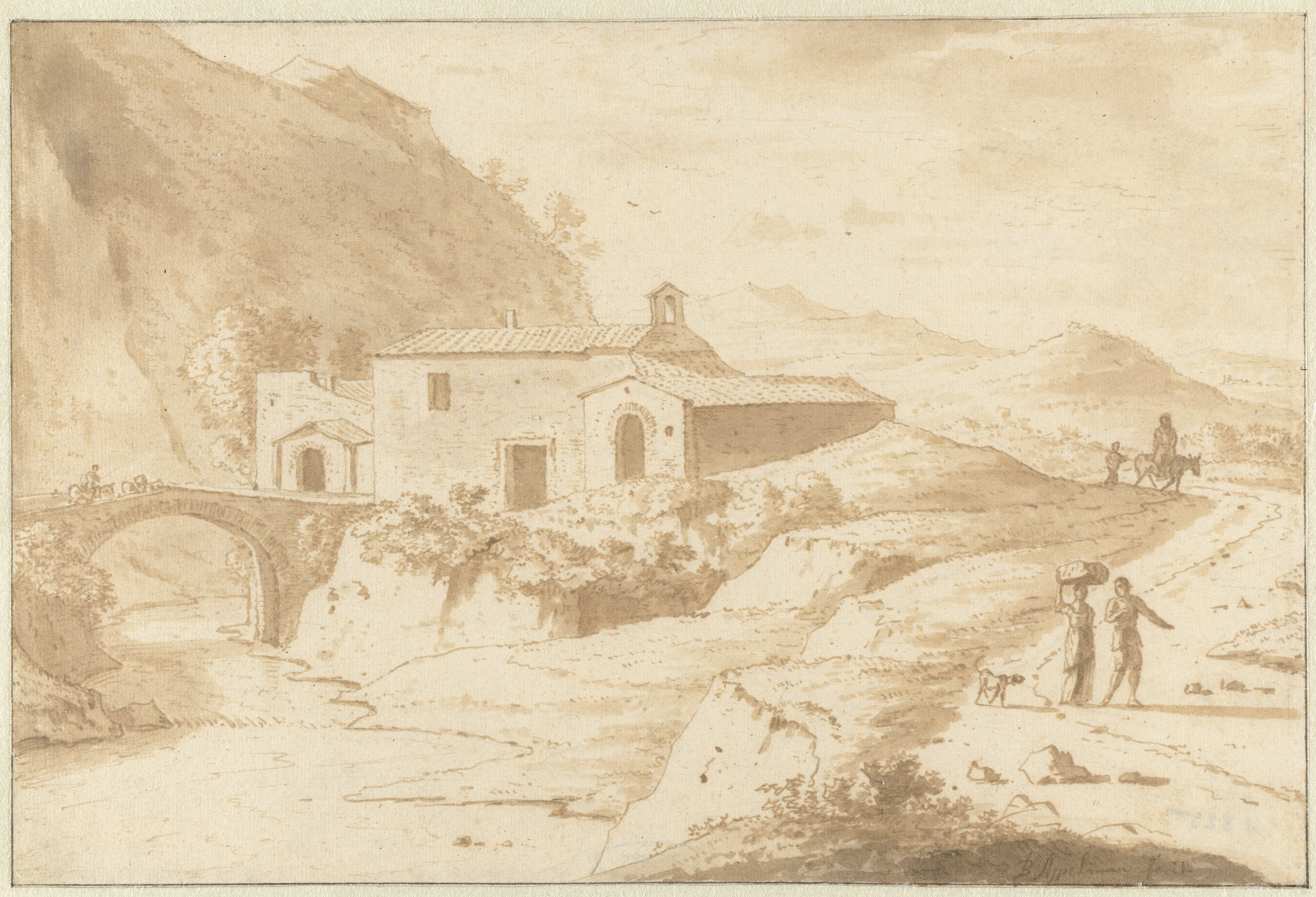
Hill landscape with a chapel by a bridge

He was a landscape painter who created landscapes in the Italianising style which was then popular in his country. He made paintings and drawings of landscapes and views of Rome. In Soestdijk Palace, the residence of the Prince of Orange, he decorated a large room with landscapes, which were widely admired in his time.

He collaborated with other painters. He painted the landscape backgrounds in portraits of Jan de Baen. He also made collaborative works with painters such as Johannes Lingelbach, Adriaen van de Velde and Philips Wouwerman.
