= Frans Denys =

Flemish painter (1610–1670)

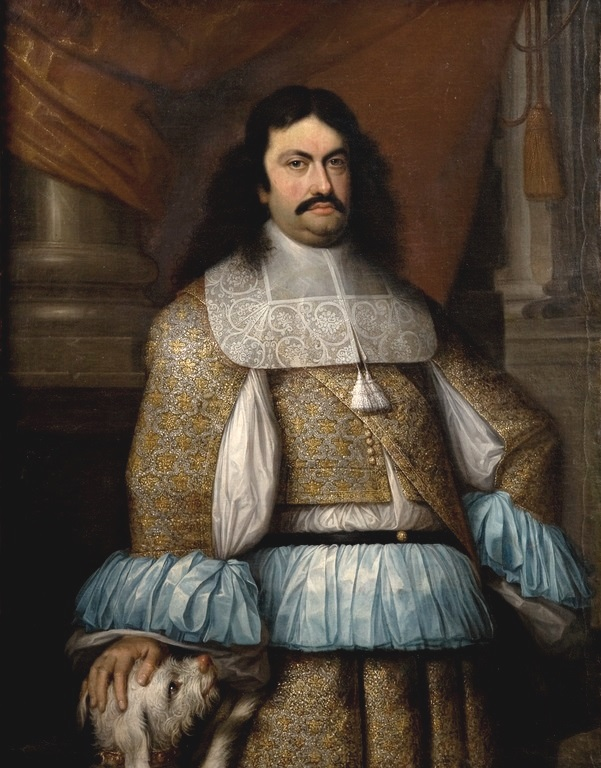
Portrait of Ranuccio II Farnese, Duke of Parma

Frans Denys or Frans Denijs (c. 1610, Antwerp – 12 September 1670, Mantua), was a Flemish Baroque painter mainly of portraits. After a successful career in Antwerp as a portrait painter to an elite clientele he travelled abroad and worked as a court painter in Germany and Italy.

== Life ==
He was likely born in Antwerp around 1610 and became a master in the Antwerp Guild of St. Luke in 1631. The next year he married Martina Vleckhamers. They had seven children of whom one, Jacob, became a painter like his father. His first wife died in 1647. A year later the artist married Marie Placquet, with whom he had three daughters.

In the period 1654-1655 Denys paid reduced dues of 1 guilder to the Guild of St. Luke, an indication that he had left Antwerp in that period. From 1654 onwards, he was active abroad, first working for the art-loving Duke Frederick III, Duke of Holstein-Gottorp. Subsequently, he went to work in Italy as court painter for Ranuccio II Farnese, Duke of Parma. Later he worked for Archduchess Isabella Clara of Austria in Mantua. This is also his last place of residence where he died on 12 September 1670.

During his time in Antwerp, Jan de Duyts and Ignatius Janssen were registered as his pupils at the local Guild of St. Luke in the guild year 1641–1642.

Denys was in the past erroneously identified with the painter of the same name who was active in Ypres around the turn of the 17th century.

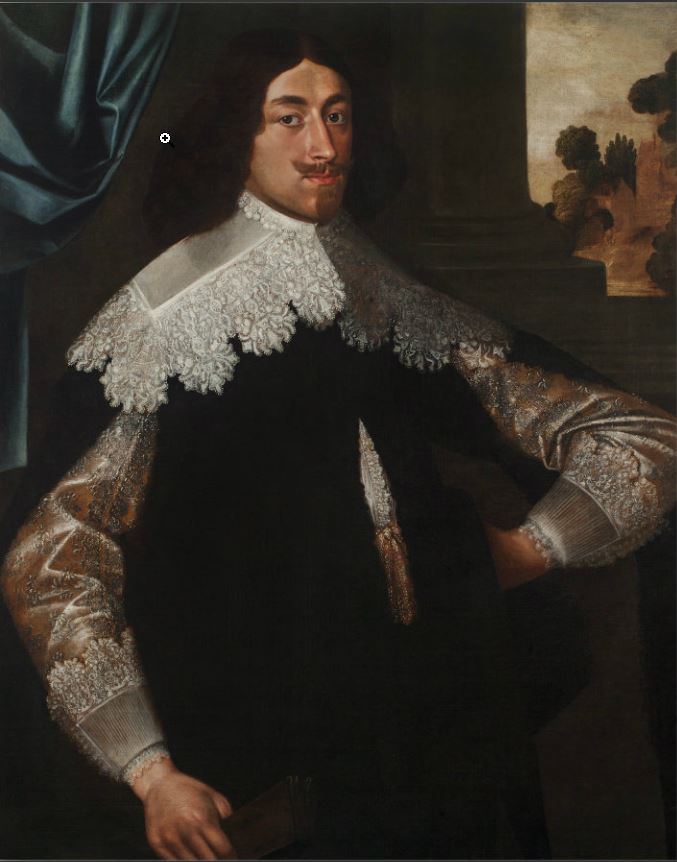
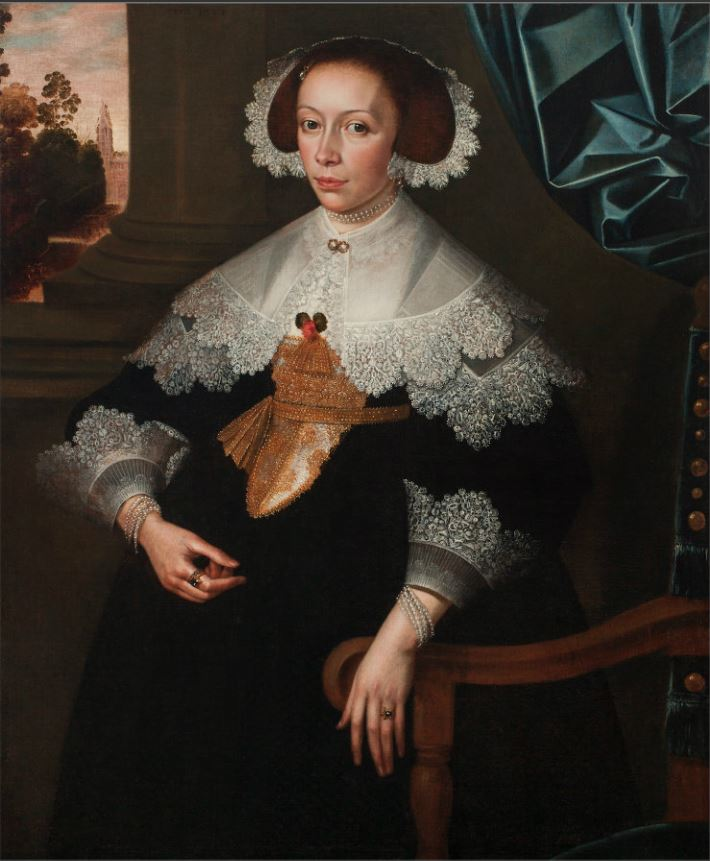
Portraits of Eugène de Berghes, and Florence-Marguerite de Renesse-Warfusée, Count and Countess of Grimbergen

== Work ==
Denys was a successful portrait painter who served an elite clientele in his hometown and abroad. His clientele included mainly aristocrats and townsmen of the middle class. He also made a number of portraits of fellow artists including of Jan van Balen, Alexander Adriaenssen and Leo van Heil. Denys painted individual as well as group portraits. In his time, he was regarded as being on a par with his contemporaries such as Justus Sustermans who was also active in Italy for a long period of time. He was seen as a follower Anthony van Dyck because he was a portrait painter of the elite. His work was forgotten until he was rediscovered by the Royal Museum of Fine Arts of Antwerp. The more traditional and severe style of his work probably explains why his work fell into oblivion.

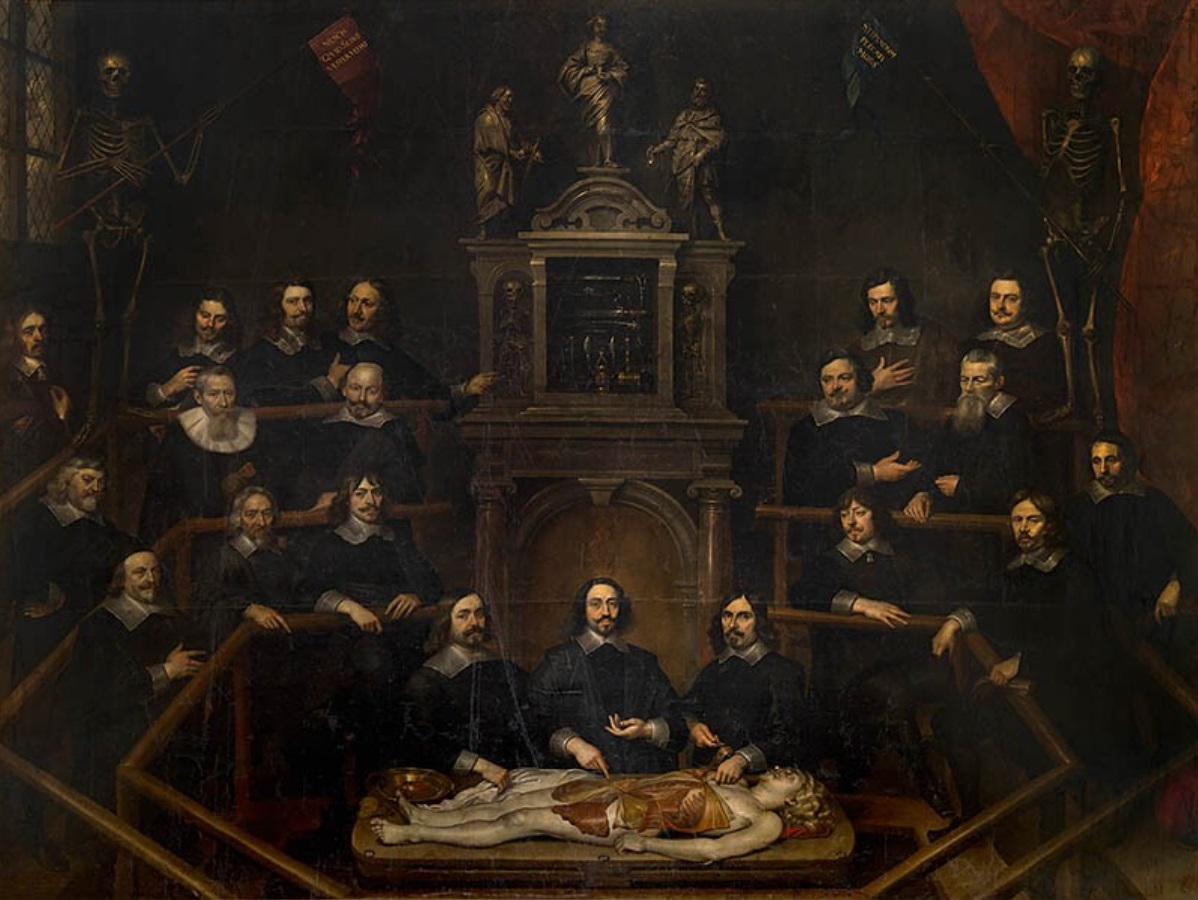
The anatomy lesson of Dr. Joannes van Buyten

Only a little over 20 paintings by Denys' hand are known. Of these, about 12 date from his Antwerp period which ran from 1635 to 1653. Two examples of the latter are the Portrait of a clergyman dated c. 1640 (Kunsthistorisches Museum, Vienna) and the Portrait of François-Paulin de Brouchoven, lord of Vechel (Palace of Versailles), which is signed and dated 1652. The collection of the palace of Versailles holds the Portrait of François-Paulin de Brouchoven, lord of Vechel who became an alderman of Antwerp. This work is signed and dated 1652. Among his works made after he left Flanders are the portraits of Ranuccio II Farnese, Duke of Parma and Isabella d'Este, Duchess of Parma (1660s, Pinacoteca Stuard, Parma).

Denys usually depicted his sitters in a sitting or standing position and turned three-quarter. The portraits represent the subjects invariably in static poses against a sober background. Only in the hands did Denys introduce some variation by painting them in different twisted positions and spread fingers, although these gestures do not appear to bear any specific meaning. The focus in the portraits is on the execution of the faces and representation of the clothing, which is sometimes quite sumptuous. The facial features are usually rather sharp. The portraits show little individual expression while the sitters lack expression and stare straight and seriously at the viewer. Denys' portraits are further characterised by their overall sober execution.

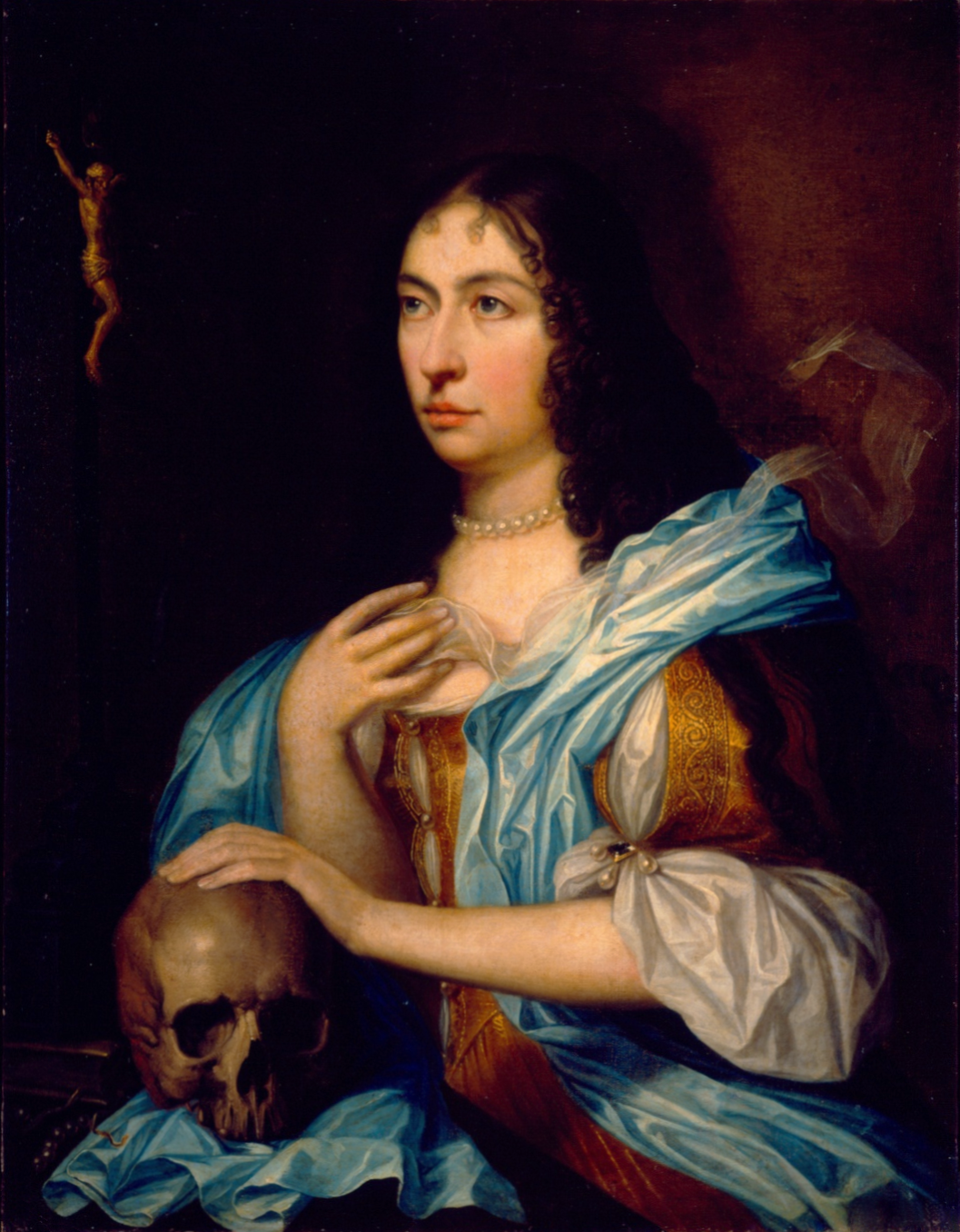
Portrait of Maria Maddalena Farnese

The collection of the Royal Museum of Fine Arts of Antwerp holds a group portrait of surgeons attending an anatomy lesson referred to as The Anatomy Lesson of Dr. Joannes van Buyten. The work was formerly attributed to the Antwerp painter Huybrecht Sporckmans (1619–1690) and dated 1660. Recent research has provided strong evidence that the portrait was actually executed in 1648 by Frans Denys. It is the only painting of the subject of an anatomy lesson known in the Southern Netherlands whereas this subject matter was fairly popular in the Dutch Republic. The painting depicts 17 participants and three others (prelectors or instructors) attending an anatomy demonstration. In the last row on the righthand side, the first man on the left wears a brown suit rather than the black one worn by the others. The fact that he appears to bow and gesture may suggest that this person is in fact the artist himself. Alternatively, this figure possibly represents the gildeknaap (guild servant), who was wearing a different color suit to distinguish him from the surgeons.

A large number of his portraits were engraved. Some were likely intended for this medium. His oil sketch portrait of Alexander Adriaenssen is believed to be the basis for the portrait of Alexander Adriaenssen, which was engraved by Antony van der Does for the Iconographia of Anthony van Dyck.
