= Jacob Denys =

Flemish painter (1644–1708)

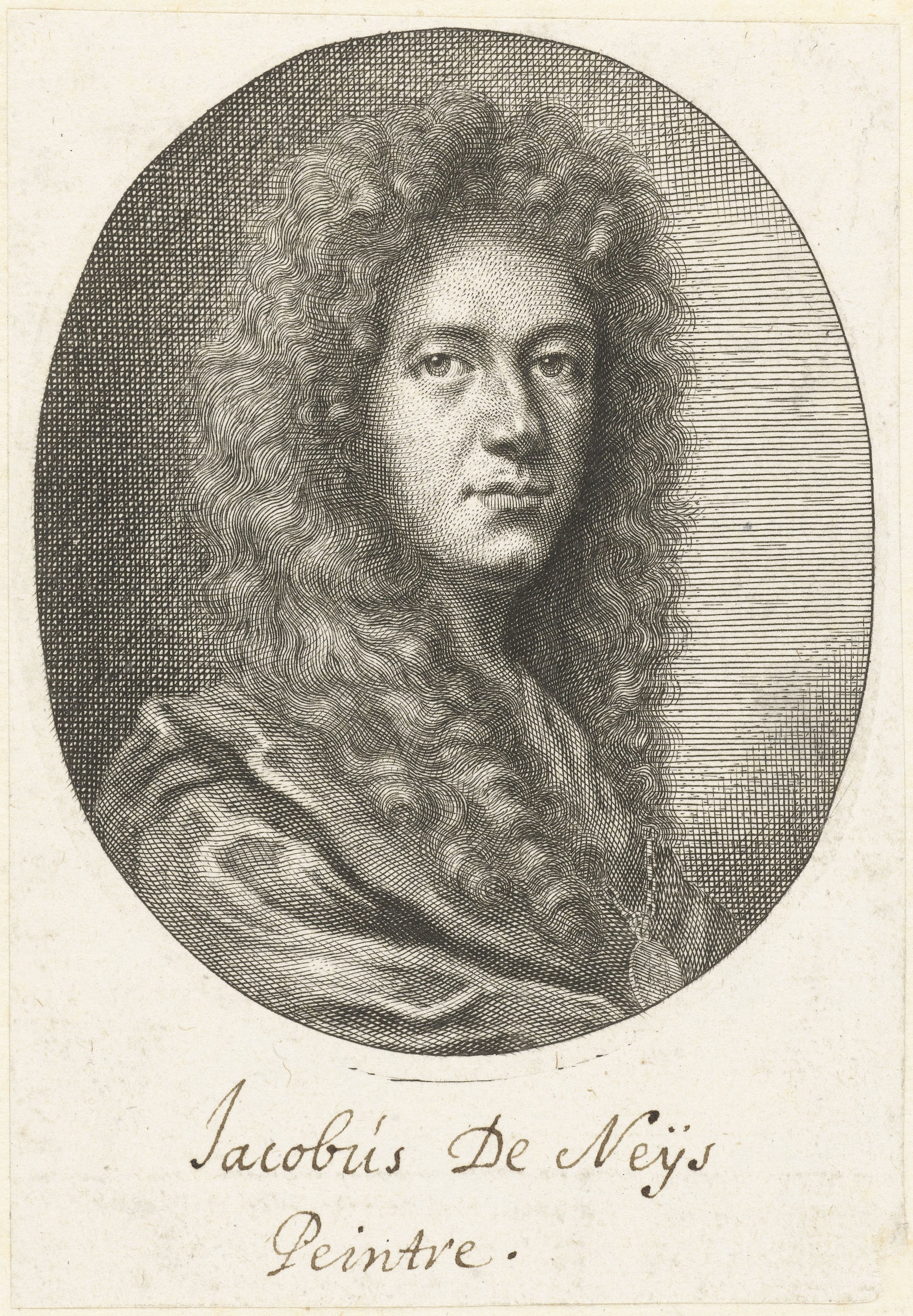
Portrait of Jacob Denys engraved by Richard Collin

Jacob Denys or Jacob Denys (II) (1644–1708) was a Flemish Baroque painter. His known works are mainly portraits. He also painted landscapes and history paintings. After training in Antwerp, he worked for a long time in Italy where he enjoyed the patronage of Duke of Mantua, Ferdinando Gonzaga, and the Duke of Tuscany, Cosimo III de' Medici.

== Life ==
There has been confusion about painters called Jacob Denys as there are three painters with that name: a Jacob Denys (I) active in the second half of the 16th century, Jacob Denys (II) who is the subject of this article and an unrelated Jacob Denys (III). Jacob Denys (II) was born in Antwerp where he was baptized in the cathedral on 29 July 1644. He was the son of the prominent portrait painter Frans Denys and Martina Vleckhamer. His father had a successful career in Antwerp as a portrait painter to an elite clientele and later traveled abroad and worked as a court painter in Germany and Italy. Jacob was a pupil of his father and of the painter Erasmus Quellinus the Younger.

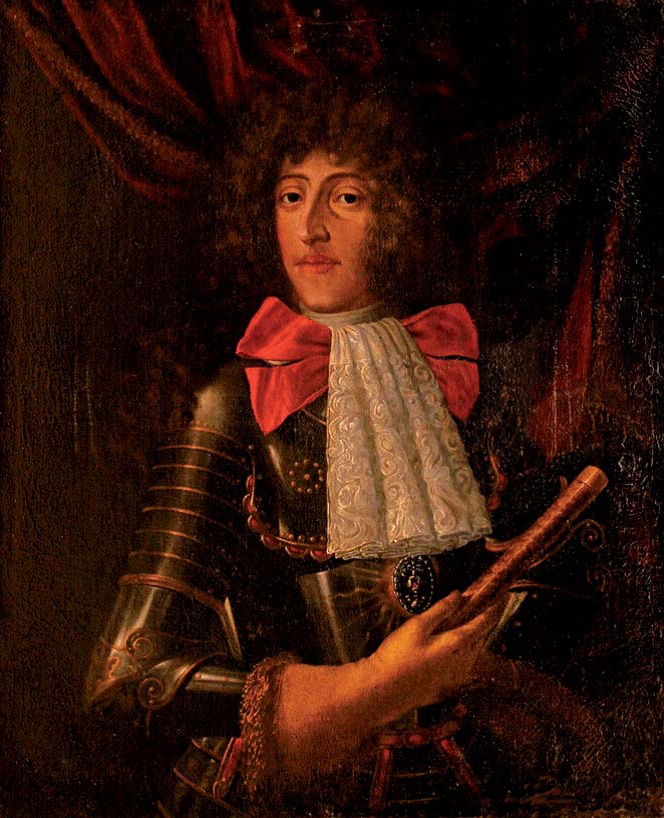
Portrait of Duke Ferdinando Carlo Gonzaga

He made the study trip to Italy which many of his fellow Flemish artists had become accustomed to make since the 16th century. His father had in fact preceded him to Italy as he left Flanders in 1655 and finally ended up working at the court of Parma from 1662 onwards. Jacob is recorded in 1666 in Venice, Rome, Naples and Bologna. He settled that year in Mantua where he worked at the court of the Duke of Mantua, Ferdinando Gonzaga. At this time another Flemish artist, Frans Geffels, had been appointed by the duke of Mantua as the prefetto delle fabbriche ('Prefect of the Buildings'), a position which combined the duties of official court painter, architect, surveyor of the Ducal construction program and engineer for theatrical stage design. Geffels may have been instrumental in securing him commissions at the court and by other patrons in Mantua. His father joined him in Mantua in 1669 and became a court painter too. Father and son collaborated on room decorations in Mantua. His father died in Mantua on 12 September 1670.

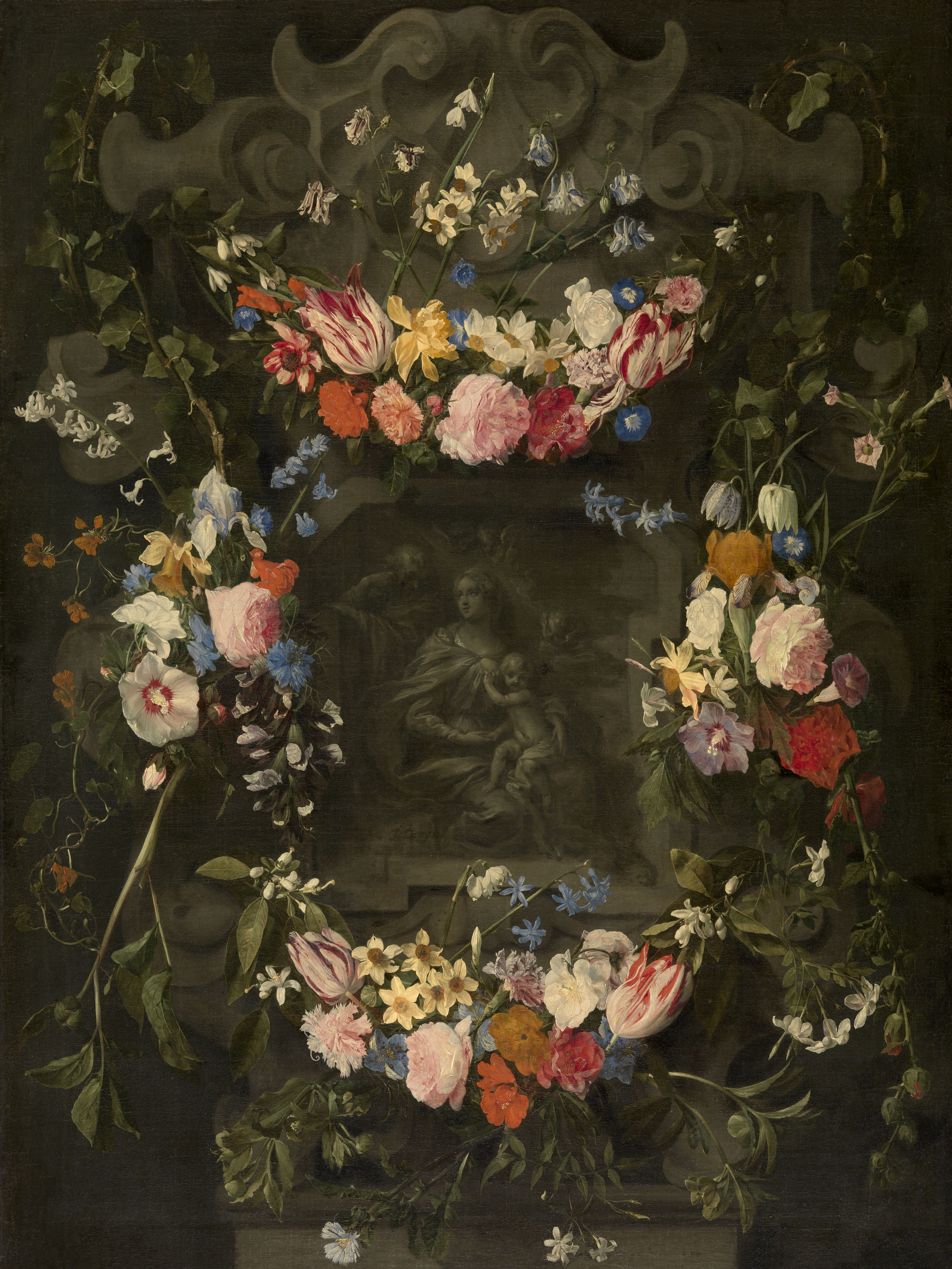
The Holy Family in a flower garland

He moved to Florence in 1672 where he worked for the Duke of Tuscany, Cosimo III de' Medici. In the same year he was also active in Sabbioneta. He worked in Venice in 1674 and again in Mantua in 1675. In 1679 he was back in Antwerp where he became a member of the Guild of St. Luke as a 'wijnmeester' ('wine master', a free master who was the son of an existing or past member of the Guild). From 1680 to 1682 he was active in Brussels. On 9 May 1691 he married Isabella Librechts. From business documents relating to the couple it is obvious that the couple was financially very well off.

He returned to Mantua in the period from 1697 to 1700. The time and place of his death is not known but it is believed it was after August 1700 and probably in Mantua.

== Work ==
His known works are mainly portraits. He also painted landscapes and history paintings. Seven large history paintings by his hand are in the presbytery of the church of San Maurizio in Mantua, including an Apparition of Madonna and Child to Saints Margaret and Maurice and the Blessed Theatines.

As a figure painter he collaborated on 'garland paintings'. Garland paintings are a type of still life invented in early 17th century Antwerp by Jan Brueghel the Elder and subsequently practised by leading Flemish still life painters, commencing with Daniel Seghers. Paintings in this genre typically show a flower or, less frequently, fruit garland around a devotional image or portrait. The Holy Family in a flower garland (Royal Museum of Fine Arts Antwerp) is an example of a garland painting on which Denys collaborated. In this work Daniel Seghers painted the still life elements while Denys added the figures of the Holy Family inside the cartouche. This potentially happened after Seghers had already died. The Metropolitan Museum of Art holds a drawing which is a design for another garland painting representing Diana and Endymion in a central artouche.
