= Hans de Jode =

Dutch painter

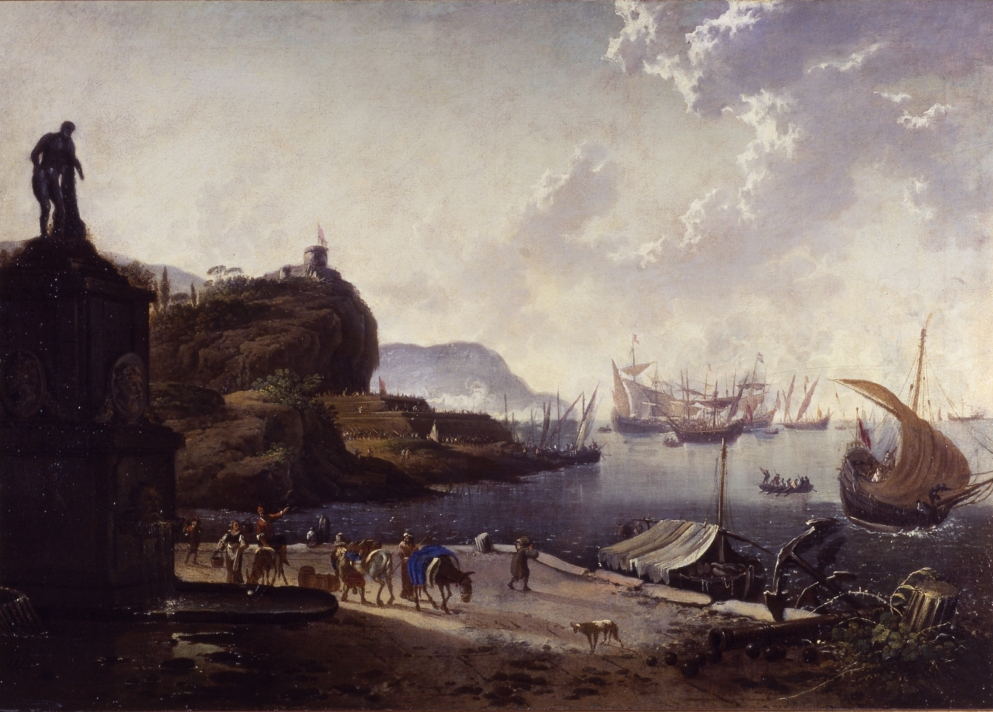
Harbour scene with classical elements

Hans de Jode or Jan de Jode (The Hague, 1630 – Vienna, after 1662) was a Dutch painter known for his marine paintings, harbour scenes and Italianate landscapes. He left his native Holland at an early age and worked in Venice and Vienna. In the latter city where he likely lived the rest of his life, he was part of the circle of Dutch and Flemish artists with contacts to the Imperial court.

== Life ==
Very little is known about this artist who is believed to have been born in The Hague in 1630. He also trained as an artist in his native city. The earliest documented reference to the artist dates to 1656. On 10 July of that year the painter Petrus Vignois addressed a petition to the Hof van Holland (Court of Holland, at that time the highest judicial authority in the Dutch Republic) from the jail in The Hague where he was locked up. In his petition Vignois recounts the events that had led to his arrest: on the evening of 25 August 1647 he and his fellow painters Hans de Jode, Carel Codde and Bartholomeus Appelman were strolling through The Hague when two men started following and harassing them. Despite the painters' entreaties for them to back off, they were forced to draw their swords. In the ensuing scuffle de Jode injured one of the men so badly that he died immediately. De Jode fled The Hague the same night. The three other painters stayed in The Hague until each of them set off on their study trip to Italy. The bailiff only started his proceedings against the foursome in 1653. Codde who was the only one who had come back to The Hague could quickly prove his innocence and was let go. The three others residing abroad were not even aware that proceedings had been commenced against them. Vignois was locked up upon his return from Italy in 1656. He mentions in his petition that it was believed that de Jode was at that moment residing in Venice or in Constantinople. This may be proof that de Jode may have really visited Constantinople.

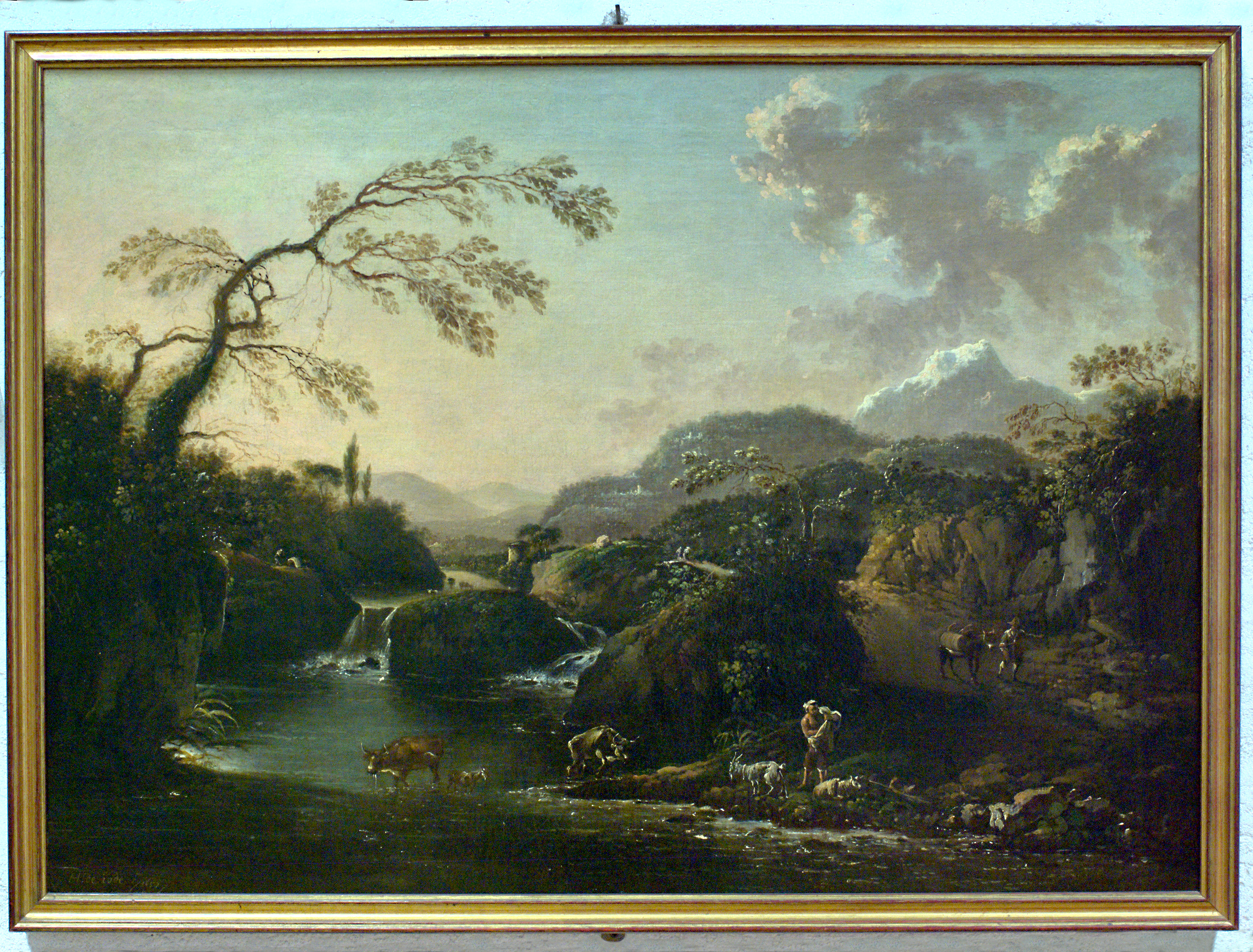
Italianate landscape with a cascade

After leaving Holland in a rush in 1647, de Jode is believed to have traveled first to Venice. Here he is likely to have encountered both Johann Anton Eismann, a painter of marine and battle scenes from Salzburg and Joseph Heintz the Younger, a painter of mythological and religious scenes from Augsburg. He is assumed to have travelled on to Rome, the destination of most Netherlandish artists of his time. The influence of the painterly and dramatic style of the Rome-based artist Salvator Rosa on de Jode's work seems to support such visit to Rome. De Jode's landscapes further reprise motifs of the so-called Bamboccianti, a group of mainly Dutch and Flemish genre painters active in Rome who created small cabinet paintings of the everyday life of the lower classes in Rome and its countryside.

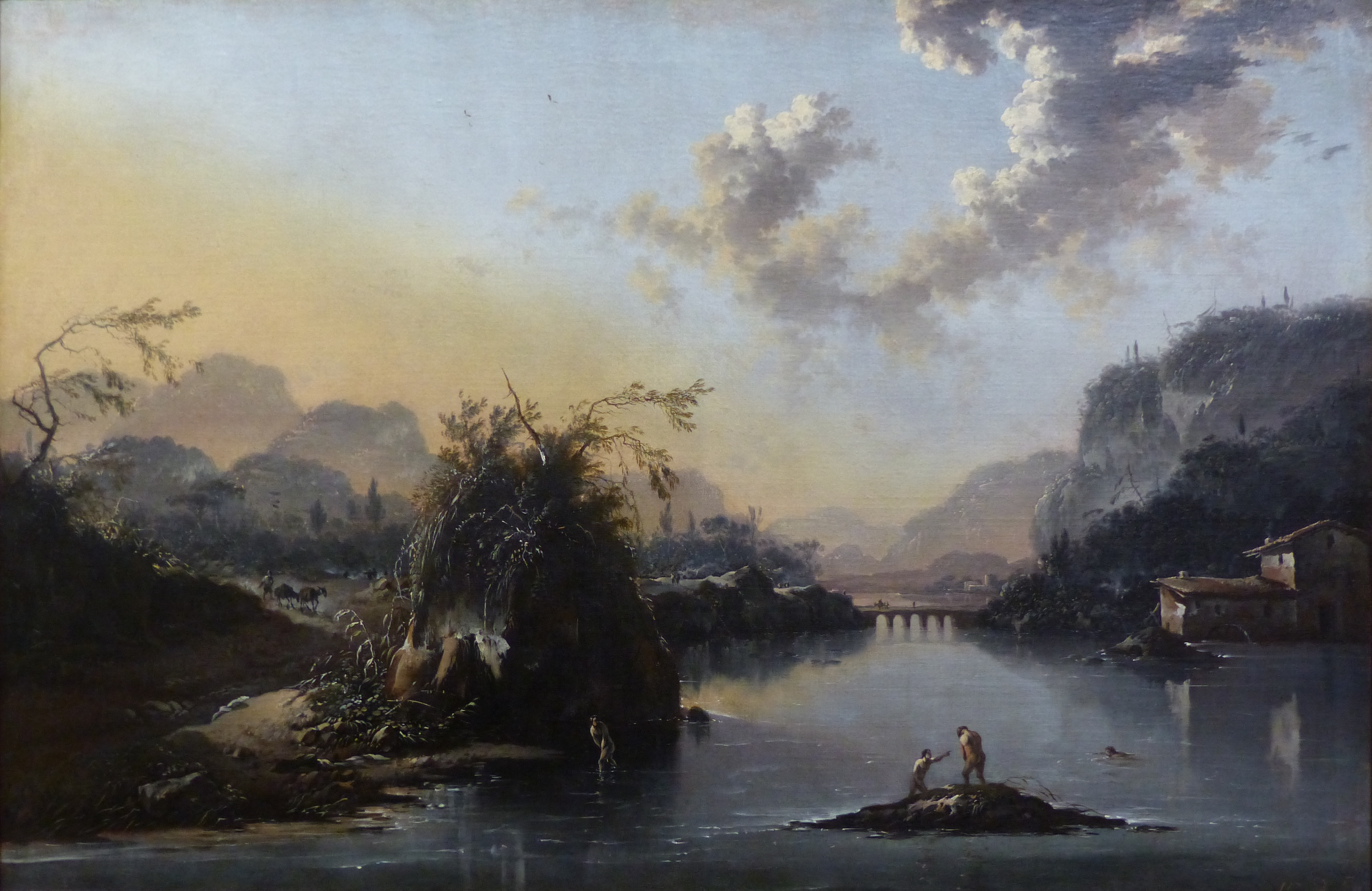
Wide river view with bathers

De Jode left Italy for Vienna no later than 1659, the year in which he painted the View of the Tip of the Seraglio with Topkapi Palace (Kunsthistorisches Museum). The next year de Jode worked along with Jan van Ossenbeeck and Nikolaus van Hoy on a publication documenting the stage set made for the premiere of Giovanni Francesca Marcello's play 'Il Pelope Geloso'. The only lifetime record on de Jode was made on the occasion of his wedding with Elisabeth Gaillet on 8 January 1662 in the Schottenkirche (Scottish church) in Vienna. Witnesses at the wedding were two Flemish artists from Antwerp, the painter Jan de Herdt and the printmaker Franciscus van der Steen. Van der Steen had arrived in Vienna when Archduke Leopold Wilhelm of Austria gave up his position as governor of the Spanish Netherlands and returned to Vienna in 1656. The presence of two Flemish artists at his wedding demonstrates that de Jode moved in the circle of Netherlandish artists who worked in Vienna, often on commissions of the imperial court.

De Jode died not long after his marriage as no paintings by him dated after 1661 are known. Between 1677 and 1680 Prince Karl Eusebius, Prince of Liechtenstein, the founder of the Liechtenstein collections, acquired 11 paintings by de Jode for the picture gallery in his palace at Valtice in the South Moravian Region. Many of these sales were brokered by the Flemish landscape painter Renier Meganck from Brussels. Stylistic similarities between the works of Meganck and de Jode suggest that Meganck spent some time in the latter's workshop and possibly even took over de Jode's workshop after his death. Meganck clearly acted as de Jode's testamentary executioner.

== Work ==
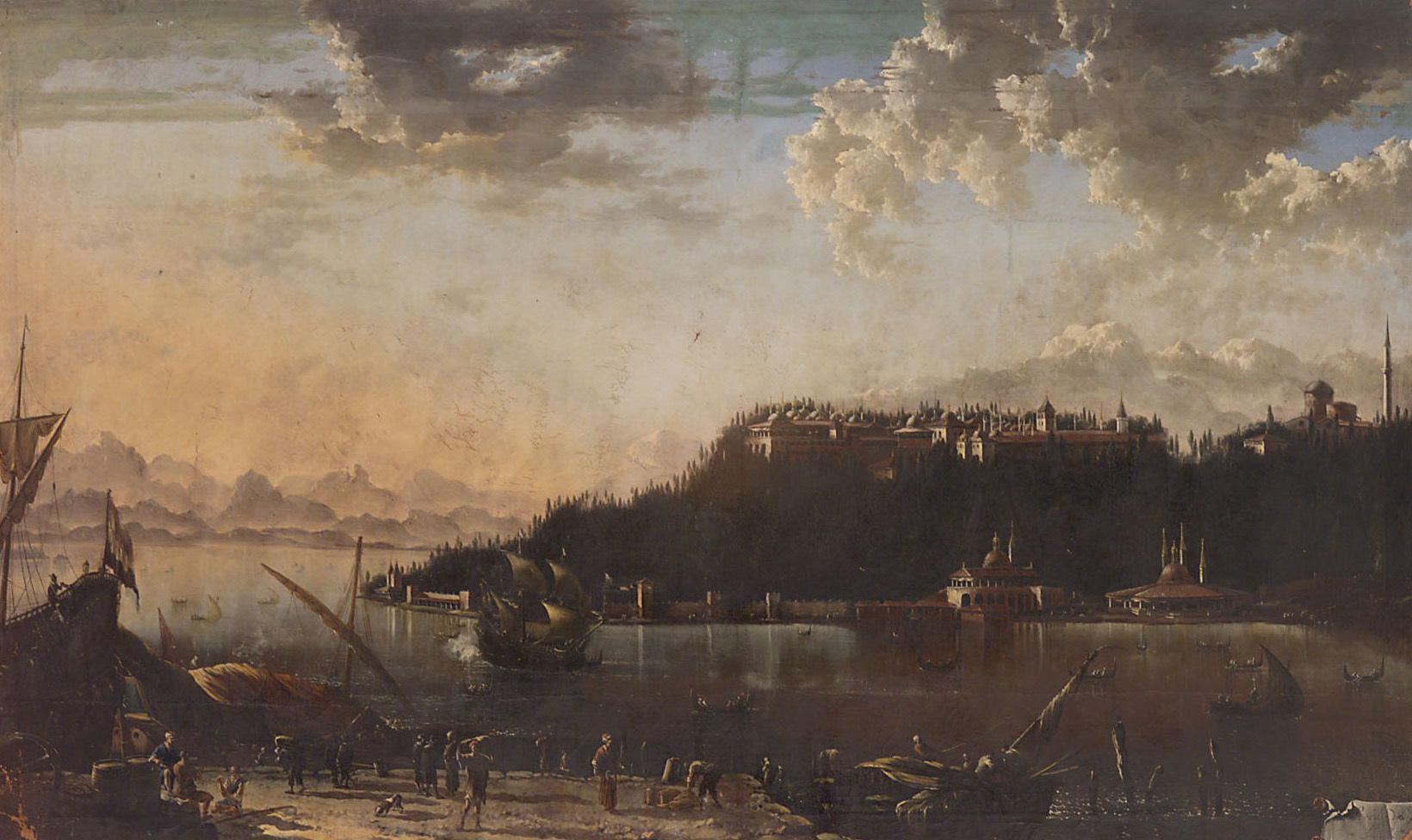
View of the Tip of the Seraglio with Topkapı Palace

De Jode was a specialist landscape painter who created marine paintings, harbour scenes and Italianate landscapes. His oeuvre reflects the ideas and motifs with which he familiarised himself during his residence in Italy. Johann Anton Eismann likely aroused in him an interest in marine painting while Joseph Heintz the Younger's use of dramatic lighting was influential on the use of light in his work. The painterly qualities and dramatic lighting in the work of the Salvator Rosa were further influences. The Bamboccianti painters with their representations of low-life scenes of every-day life amidst landscapes informed the choice of some of his paintings. The Dutch Italianate landscape painters such as Karel Dujardin or Nicolaes Berchem who created harbour views and Arcadian landscapes bathed in a warm southern light can also be found in de Jode's work.

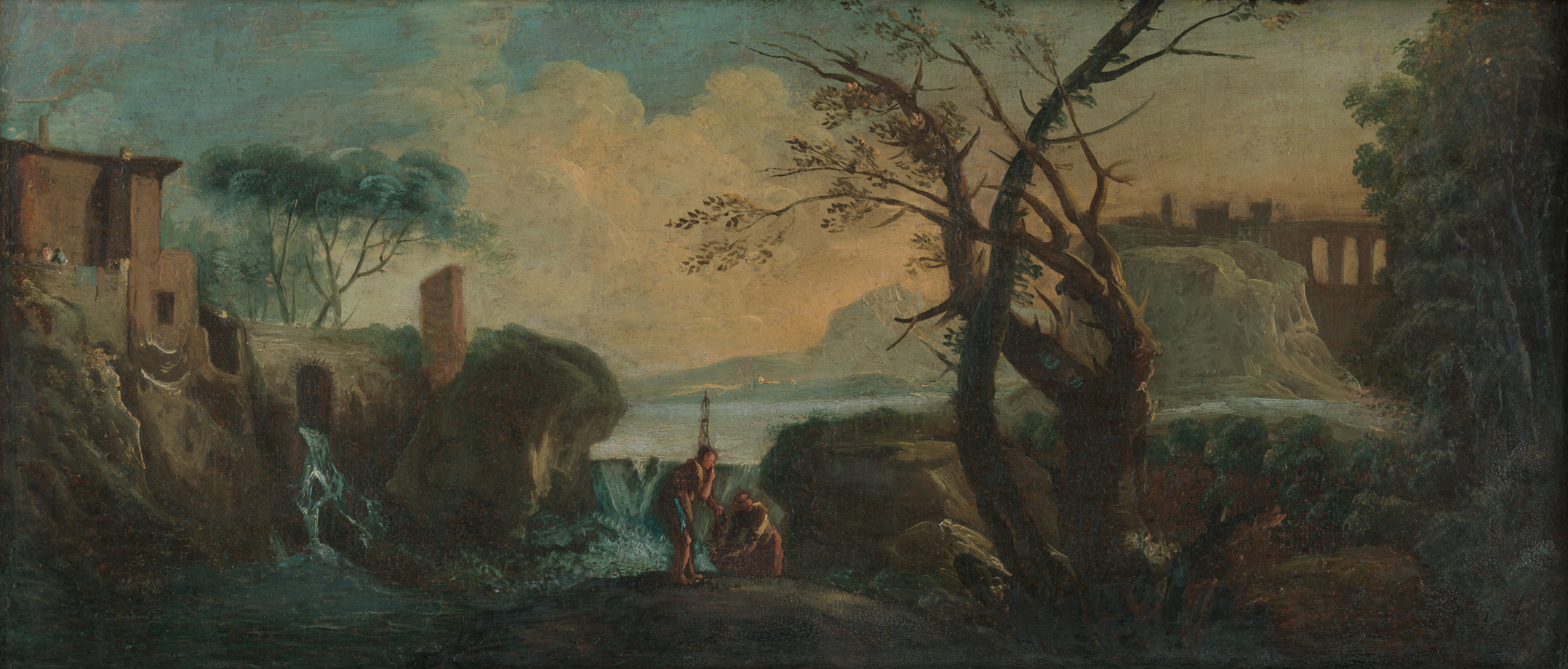
Fishermen by a waterfall

Two of de Jode's signed landscapes now in the Castelvecchio Museum in Verona, which are dated 1657, clearly show the influence of these disparate inspirations. This is particularly marked in the Harbour scene with classical elements, where the Bamboccianti inspiration is evident in the staffage on the quay and the influence of Salvator Rosa and the Duch Arcadian landscape painters in the classical elements and towers. The Northern-European influence is also visible in the figures and his attention to the atmospheric rendering of the scene, in particular through the modulation of the light.

His View of the Tip of the Seraglio with Topkapı Palace (1659, Kunsthistorisches Museum) is regarded by some as evidence that he visited Constantinople in the 1650s. However, as his view includes certain inaccuracies it is more likely that he based the view on multiple sources, including prints, of the city which he conflated into his composition.
