= Jan Baptist van Heil =

Flemish Baroque painter (1609–c. 1695)

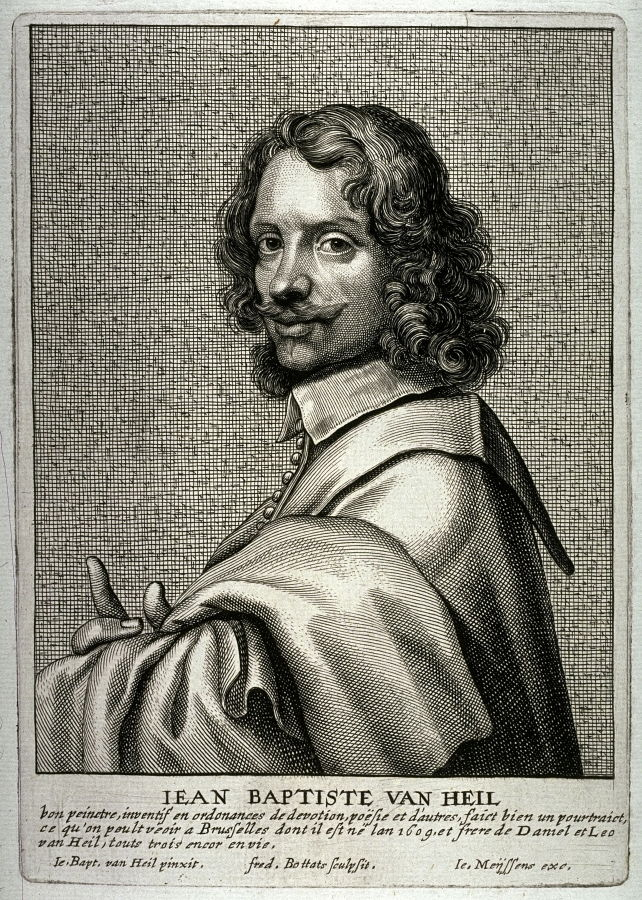
- Portrait of Jan Baptist van Heil engraved by Frederik Bouttats the Younger after the artist's own design
- Born: 1609; Brussels, Brabant
- Died: c. 1695 (aged c. 86)
- Known for: Painting

Jan Baptist van Heil or Jan Baptiste van Heil (1609 – c. 1695), was a Flemish Baroque painter of portraits and religious paintings.

== Life ==
Little is known about the life and training of Jan Baptist van Heil. He was born in Brussels. His father Leo or Leon was a painter and two of his brothers were also artists: Leo was an architect and painter and Daniel was a landscape painter.

It is not known with whom Jan Baptist trained but it was likely his father.

The artist died in Brussels some time between 1685 and 1705.

== Work ==
Only a few of Jan Baptist van Heil's works are known. He is mainly known for his work as a portrait painter. He was the designer of the portraits of the three van Heil brothers that appeared in Het Gulden Cabinet, the book with artist biographies by Cornelis de Bie published in Antwerp in 1662. The portraits were engraved by Frederik Bouttats the Younger. He also designed the Portrait of Breynaert (a man known for his excessive eating), which was engraved by Antony van der Does.

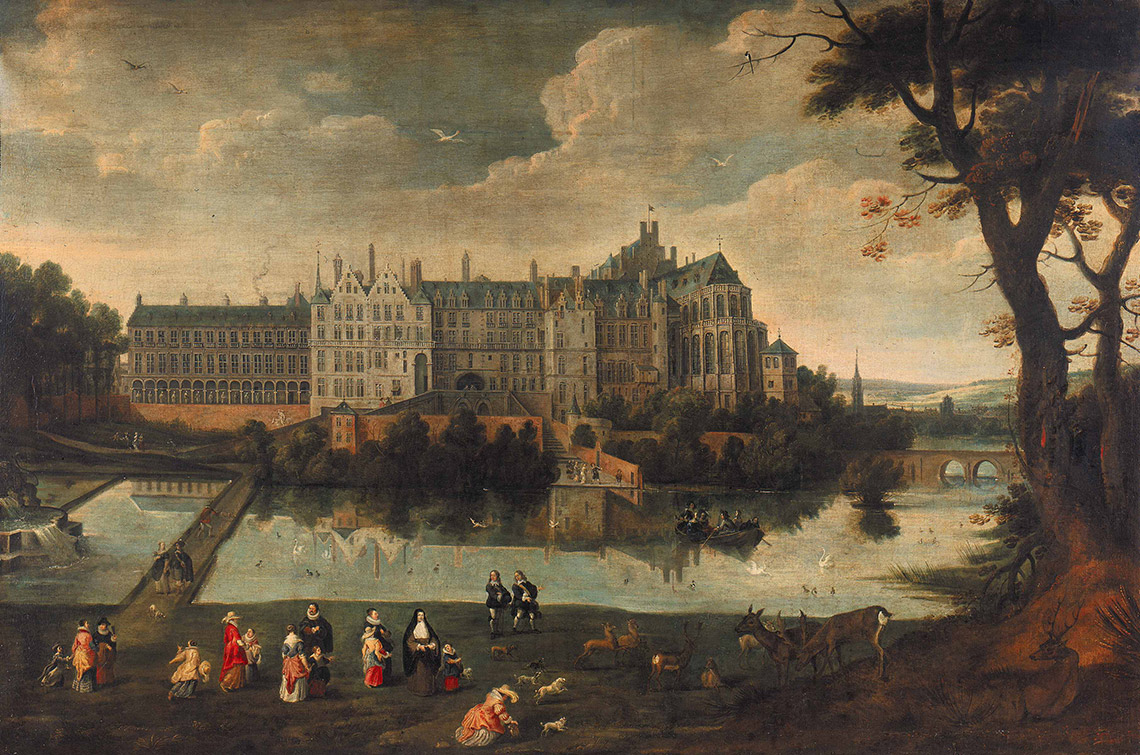
Infante Isabella in the gardens of the Coudenberg Palace

He also painted religious scenes as altarpieces for local churches. An example is the Adoration of the Magi in the St. John's Evangelist Church of Tervuren.

Jan Baptist van Heil collaborated with his brother Daniel on the Infante Isabella in the gardens of the Coudenberg Palace (c. 1630, Museum of the City of Brussels). Jan Baptist is believed to have been responsible for the staffage while his brother Daniel painted the landscape and the palace. The canvas shows a landscape with the palace of the governors of the Southern Netherlands near Brussels. In the foreground the Archduchess Isabella, widow of Archduke Albrecht and reigning governess, walks in the gardens of the palace in the habit of the Poor Clares, a religious order the Archduchess had joined after the death of her husband.

Jan Baptist van Heil was invited to provide designs for the first French Theatre established in Brussels in the 1670s.
