= Leo van Heil =

Flemish architect, painter and miniature painter (1605–c. 1664)

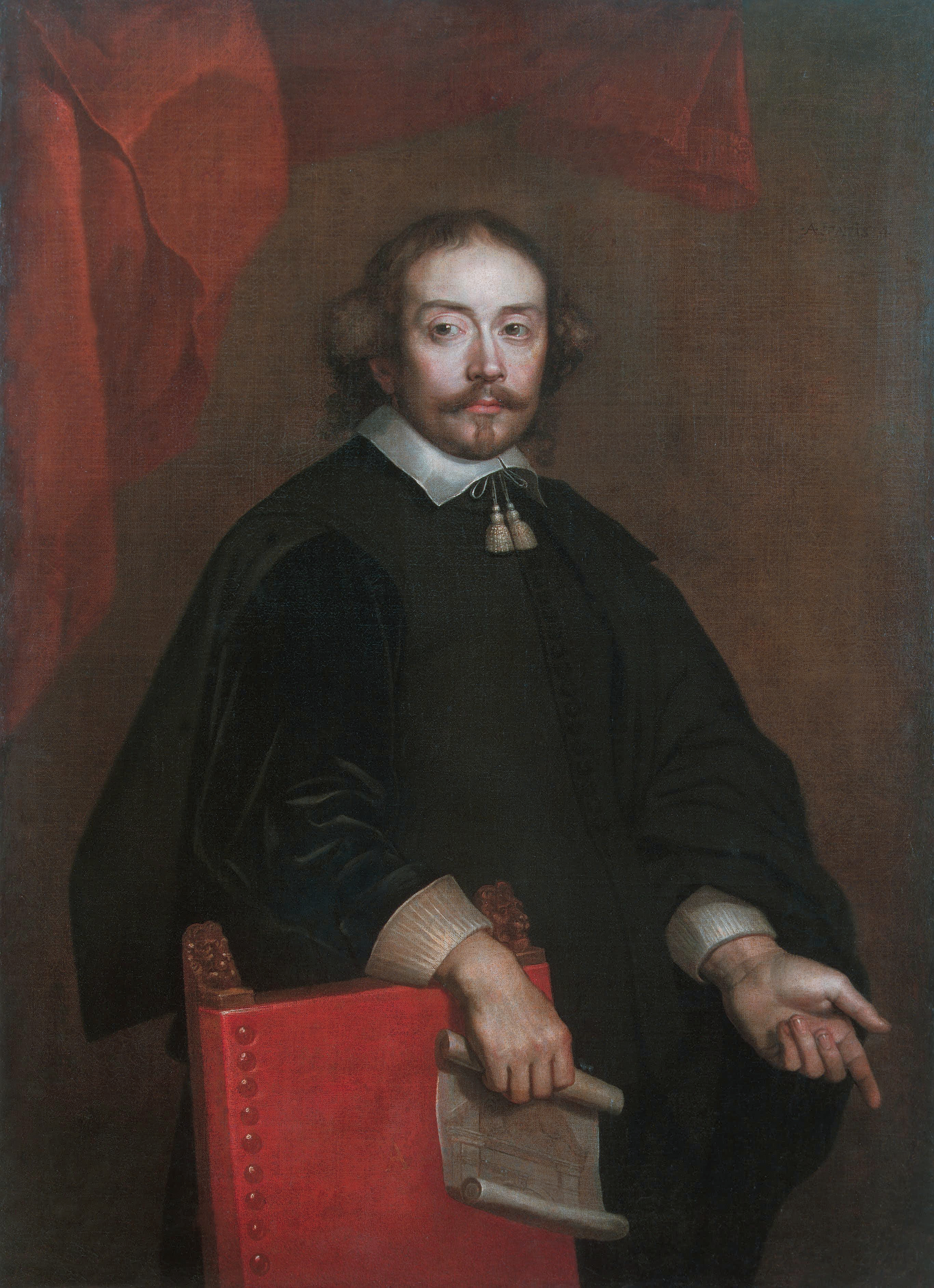
- Heil by Frans Denys, c. 1648
- Born: 1605; Brussels, Brabant
- Died: c. 1664 (aged c. 59); Brussels, Brabant
- Known for: Architecture, painting, printmaking
- Movement: Baroque

Leo van Heil (Note: Name variations: Leo Van Heil, Leonard van Heil, Leo Heil) (1605 – c. 1664) was a Flemish architect, painter and miniature painter mainly of flowers and insects. He is chiefly remembered for his designs of the Brigittines chapel and the tower of the Church of St. Nicholas, both in Brussels.

== Life ==
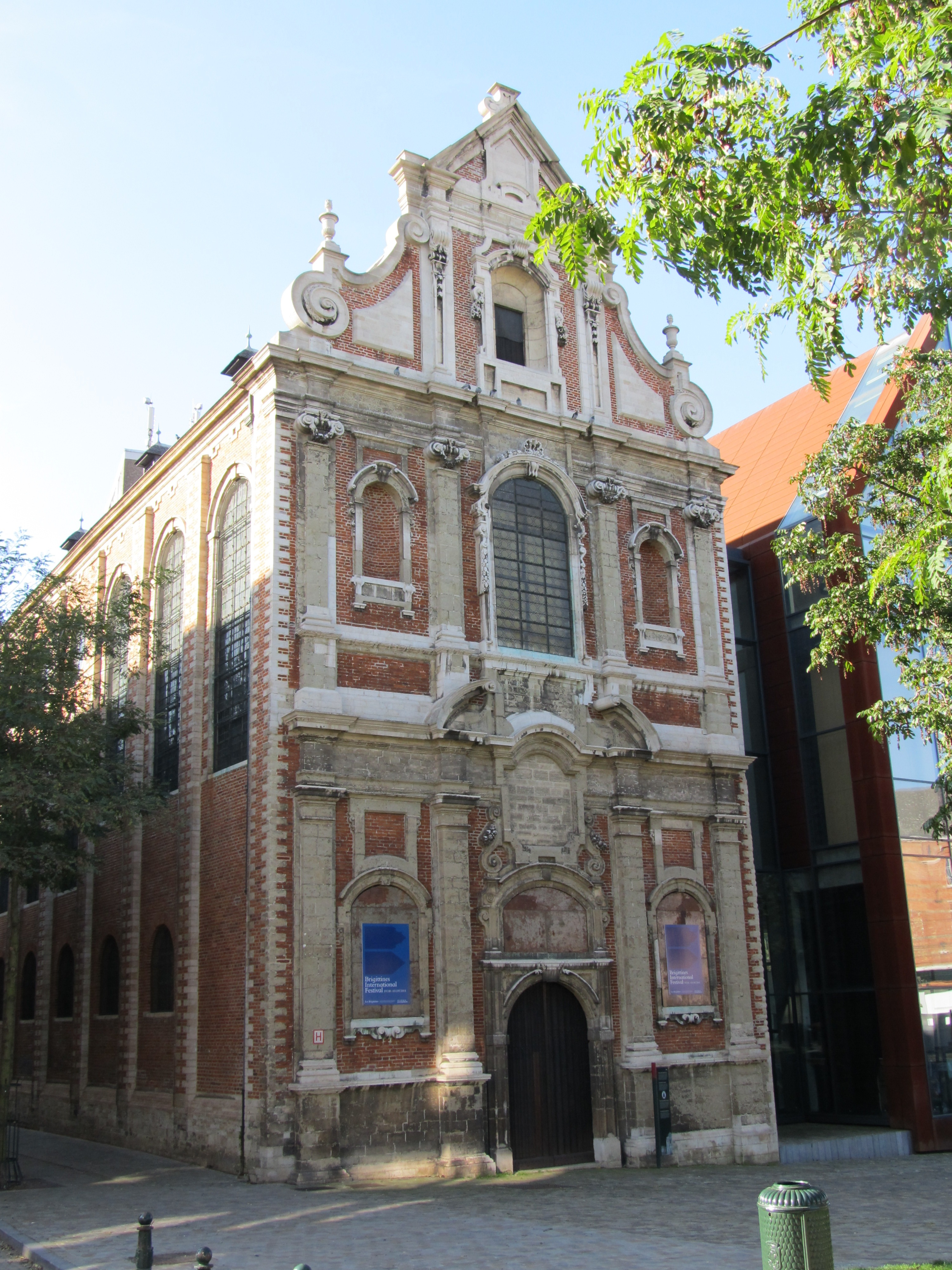
Brigittines chapel in Brussels

Leo van Heil was born in Brussels. He had two brothers who were also artists: Jan Baptist van Heil was a portrait painter and Daniel van Heil was a landscape painter specialising in winter scenes or burning fires.

When in 1648 Erasmus Quellinus was given the general artistic direction over the decorations for the Joyous Entry into Antwerp of the newly appointed governor of the Habsburg Netherlands Archduke Leopold Wilhelm, Leo van Heil worked as Quellinus' architectural assistant. The Archduke became his patron and appointed him as his court architect and commissioned various projects from van Heil, including a stone gate for the Archduke's palace in Brussels.

The painter and printmaker Renier Meganck, who later worked as a court painter in Vienna, became a pupil of Leo van Heil in Brussels in 1656.

== Work ==
In his time Leo van Heil was known as an architect, painter of flowers and insects and other small animals and perspectives (i.e. architectural works). His drawing of Tongerlo Abbey served as model for a print of Tongerlo Abbey in bird's eye perspective made by the engraver Wenceslaus Hollar.
